= Bus depots of MTA Regional Bus Operations =

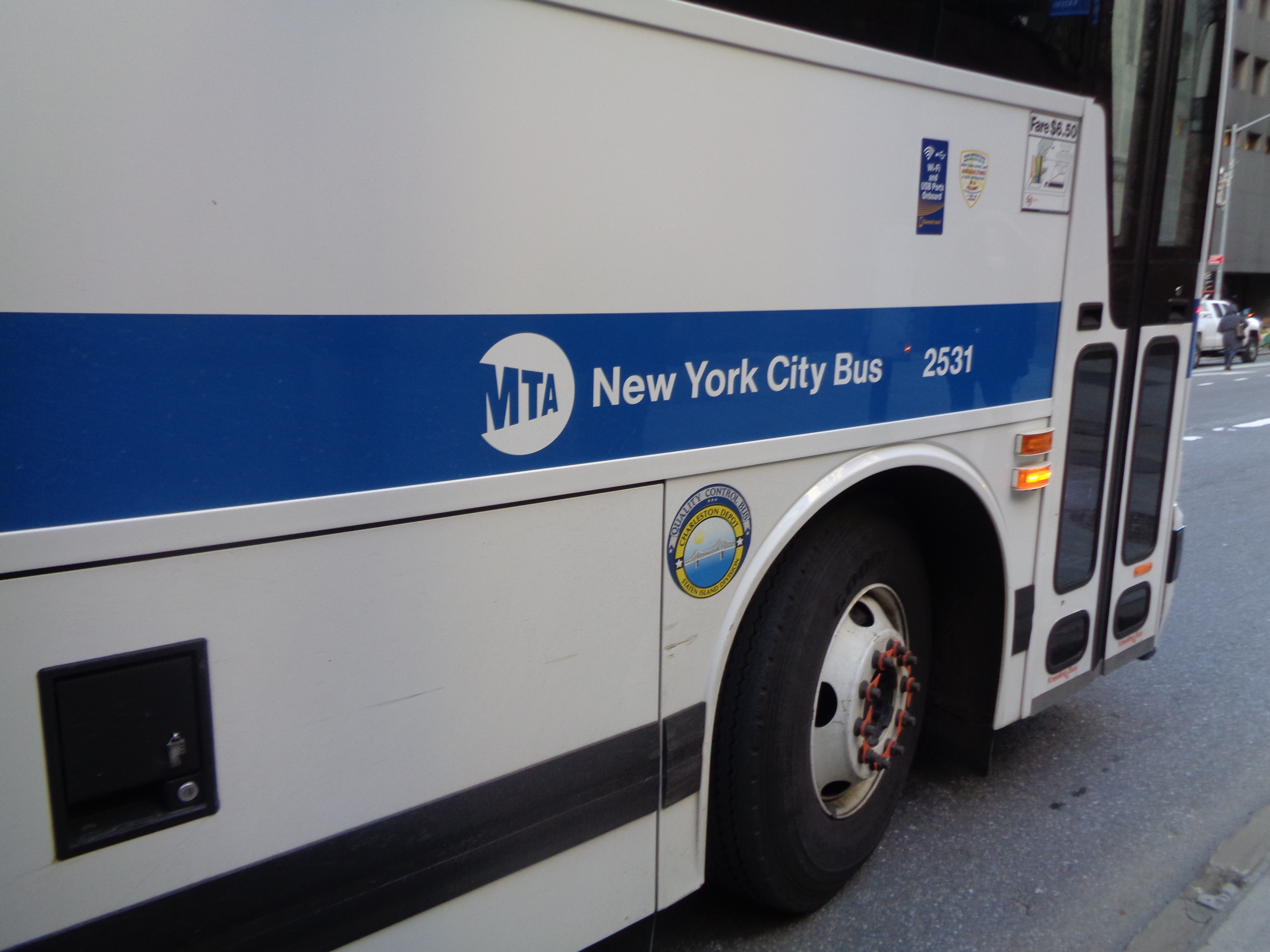
A 2015 Prevost X3-45 (2531) with a Charleston Depot sticker on it

MTA Regional Bus Operations operates local and express buses serving New York City, United States, out of 27 bus depots. These depots are located in all five boroughs of the city, plus one located in nearby Yonkers in Westchester County. 19 of these depots serve MTA New York City Transit (NYCT)'s bus operations, while the remaining eight serve the MTA Bus Company (the successor to private bus operations taken over around 2006.) These facilities perform regular maintenance, cleaning, and painting of buses, as well as collection of revenue from bus fareboxes. Several of these depots were once car barns for streetcars, while others were built much later and have only served buses.

Employees of the depots are represented by local divisions of the Transport Workers Union of America (TWU), particularly the TWU Local 100 or of the Amalgamated Transit Union (ATU)'s Local's 726 for all depots in Staten Island, 1056 for Casey Stengel, Jamaica, and Queens Village Depots, 1179 for JFK & Far Rockaway Depots, and 1181 for Spring Creek Depot.

Buses in each division may be swapped between depots on an as-needed basis as short-term loans to cover services at these depots, including school trippers. The Manhattan and Bronx Surface Transit Operating Authority (MaBSTOA) may swap between any of their depots.

== History ==
On June 1, 1940, the New York City Board of Transportation (BOT) took over the streetcar operations of the Brooklyn–Manhattan Transit Corporation (BMT), as part of the unification of the city's transit system under municipal operations. The streetcar lines would be motorized into diesel bus routes or trolleybus routes over the next two decades. In 1947, the BOT took over the North Shore Bus Company in Queens and Isle Transportation in Staten Island, giving the city control of the majority of surface transit in Brooklyn, Queens, and Staten Island. On September 24, 1948, the BOT took over the East Side Omnibus Corporation and Comprehensive Omnibus Corporation in Manhattan, receiving two depots in East Harlem. From 1947 to 1950, the BOT reconstructed numerous depots and trolley barns inherited from the private operators, and erected or purchased new facilities to expand capacity. In 1962, the New York City Transit Authority (successor to the BOT) and its subsidiary Manhattan and Bronx Surface Transit Operating Authority (MaBSTOA) took over the operations of the Fifth Avenue Coach Company in Manhattan and the Bronx. The Transit Authority inherited at least 12 bus depots from the company, some of which were kept in operation while others were condemned and closed. From 2005 to 2006, the remaining private operators were taken over by the MTA Bus Company. The MTA inherited eight facilities at this time, which had been built either by the companies or the New York City Department of Transportation (NYCDOT).

== Central Maintenance Depots ==
The MTA has two major "central maintenance facilities" (CMFs) that serve the New York City area. The Grand Avenue Central Maintenance Facility is adjacent to the Grand Avenue Depot in Maspeth, Queens, and the Zerega Avenue Central Maintenance Facility is located at 750 Zerega Avenue in the Bronx. Both maintenance facilities are responsible for the major reconstruction of buses in need of repair including engine rebuilding, transmission shops, and shops for body components on New York City Transit Authority's bus fleet, as well as repainting of buses. The facilities also include several employee workshops for surface transportation training and institutional instruction. In addition, Zerega Avenue CMF is responsible for registry of new buses in the fleet. The two facilities were conceived as part of the 1995-1999 and 2000-2004 MTA Capital Programs. The Zerega Avenue facility was opened in 2001, while the Grand Avenue facility was opened in 2007 along with the bus depot. Previously, the large repair shops of the East New York Depot served as the system's sole central maintenance shops; as of May 2016, East New York is considered a third central maintenance facility.

=== Zerega Avenue Facility ===
The Zerega Avenue Maintenance and Training Facility is a one-story structure located on the east side of Zerega Avenue between Lafayette and Seward Avenues in the Castle Hill section of the Bronx (40.822916°N 73.841587°W), sitting along the western coast of Westchester Creek. Plans for the facility were conceived around 1999, and it was constructed in 2000. The facility received an award from the American Society of Civil Engineers for design-build project of the year in 2002. Around 2002, the Zerega shops began overhauling NYCT buses to operate on ultra-low-sulfur diesel. The facility includes paint booths for MTA buses, and was designed to maintain compressed natural gas (CNG) equipment. It also features numerous classrooms and a driving simulator to train MTA bus operators.

== Bronx Division ==
The Manhattan and Bronx Surface Transit Operating Authority (MaBSTOA), a subsidiary of the New York City Transit brand, operates all the local routes in the Bronx aside from the Bx23 and Q50. The latter two routes and all express bus routes in the borough are operated by the MTA Bus Company. All depots in the division, including those under the MTA Bus Company, are represented by TWU Local 100. Although named the Bronx Division, only three are actually located in The Bronx, with the others in Inwood, Manhattan and the suburb of Yonkers.

=== Eastchester Depot (MTA Bus) ===
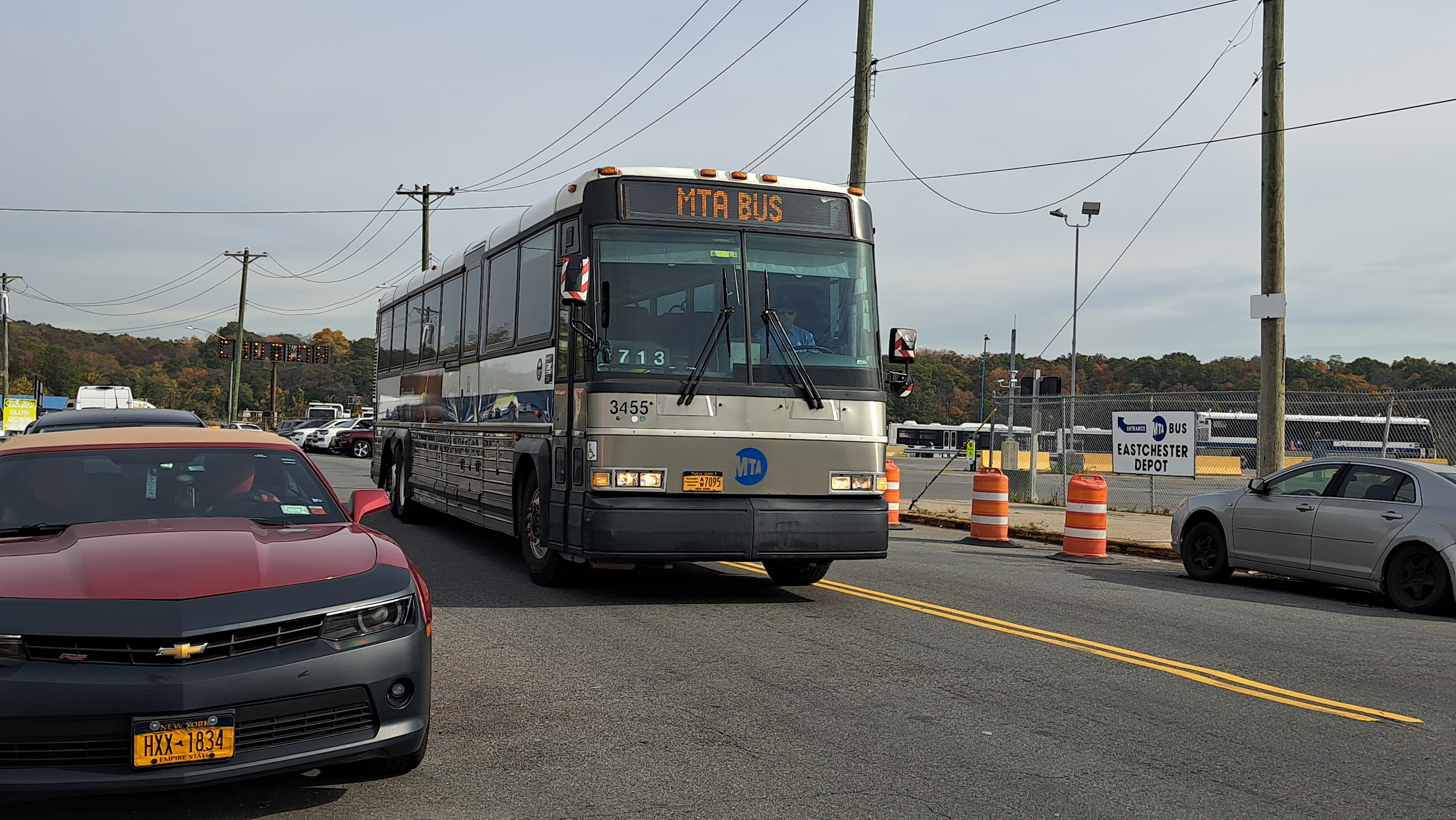
2007 MCI D4500CL #3455 exits Eastchester depot in November 2023

The Eastchester Depot is located on Tillotson Avenue near Conner Street (40.884228°N 73.821717°W) off the New England Thruway (Interstate 95) in the Eastchester and Co-op City neighborhoods of the Bronx. It was built in 1970, and is owned by Edward Arrigoni (1934-2025 aged 91), former president of New York Bus Service (NYBS), and has been leased to the City of New York and MTA Bus Company for twenty years with an option to purchase afterwards. It was renamed Eastchester Depot upon takeover on July 1, 2005. It previously housed the mass transit operations of NYBS, which operated express service between the Bronx to Manhattan as well as school bus operations.

This depot contains a major bus overhaul and repair facility/shop for various type of buses, a major "reserve storage" facility for out-of-service buses, and a storage facility for decommissioned and wrecked buses awaiting scrapping. The latter set of buses are stripped of usable parts such as windows and engine components, as well as reusable fluids such as motor oil and fuel, before the remaining shells and unsalvageable parts are sold for scrap. The scrapping program began in summer 2008. Under the MTA, the shop was upgraded with a new concrete floor. The facility underwent further renovations in the 2010s, replacing the maintenance building's roof and improving ventilation and pollution controls including containment of fuel spills. The upgraded facility opened on August 13, 2015.

==== Fleet ====
- New Flyer XD40
- MCI D4500CT
- Prevost X3-45 2G

==== Routes ====
- Local Routes: Bx23, Q50
- Express Routes: BxM6, BxM7, BxM8, BxM9, BxM10 (all former NYBS routes)

The local routes were split from Queens Surface Corporation’s QBx1 route in 2010, which operated out of College Point Depot until 2009.

=== Gun Hill Depot ===
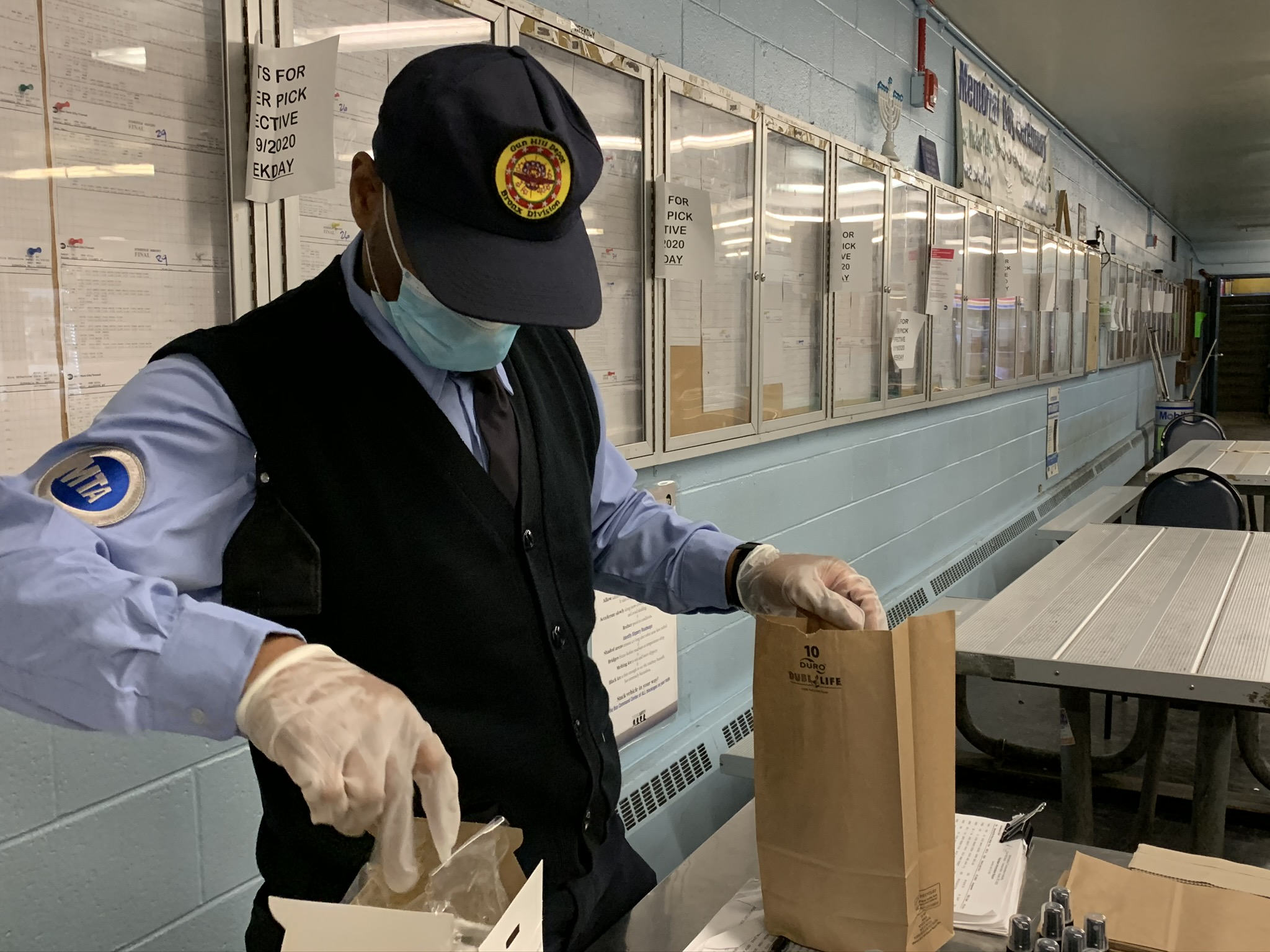
MTA employees doing a temperature check at Gun Hill depot

The Gun Hill Depot is located at 1910 Bartow Avenue near Gun Hill Road (40.866414°N 73.833071°W), west of the New England Thruway (Interstate 95) in the Baychester neighborhood of the Bronx near Co-op City, which a number of its routes serve.

The site was formerly a garbage and toxic waste dump, used at various times for both legal and illegal waste disposal. It was selected by the MTA for a new garage in 1979 to replace the original West Farms Depot It opened on September 10, 1989, also temporarily replacing the old Kingsbridge Depot, which closed on the same day for reconstruction. The depot also contains heavy maintenance facilities and serves as the Bronx's central maintenance facility upon its opening.

In 1992, the MTA built little league baseball fields on an adjacent site one block west. The MTA also owned the lot immediately south of the depot until 2014, which was leased and used as a driving range from 1999 to 2010. This land was originally planned for an expansion of the depot, or a new central rebuild facility. In June 1996, solar panels were installed on the roof of the depot. It was the first NYCTA depot to use solar energy, which now provide about 40% of the depot's power. It is also the only New York City Transit bus garage that was built on previously undeveloped land.

==== Fleet ====
- Nova Bus LFS 4G
- Nova Bus LFS HEV 3G
- New Flyer XD40
- New Flyer XE40 NG
- New Flyer XHE40
- Nova Bus LFSA
- Nova Bus LFSA 2G
- New Flyer XD60

==== Routes ====
- Local Routes: Bx16, Bx24, Bx25, Bx26, Bx28, Bx29, Bx30, Bx34, Bx38
- Articulated Local/SBS Routes: Bx4/Bx4A, Bx5, Bx12/Bx12 SBS, Bx22, Bx39, Bx40, Bx41/Bx41 SBS, Bx42

=== Kingsbridge Depot ===
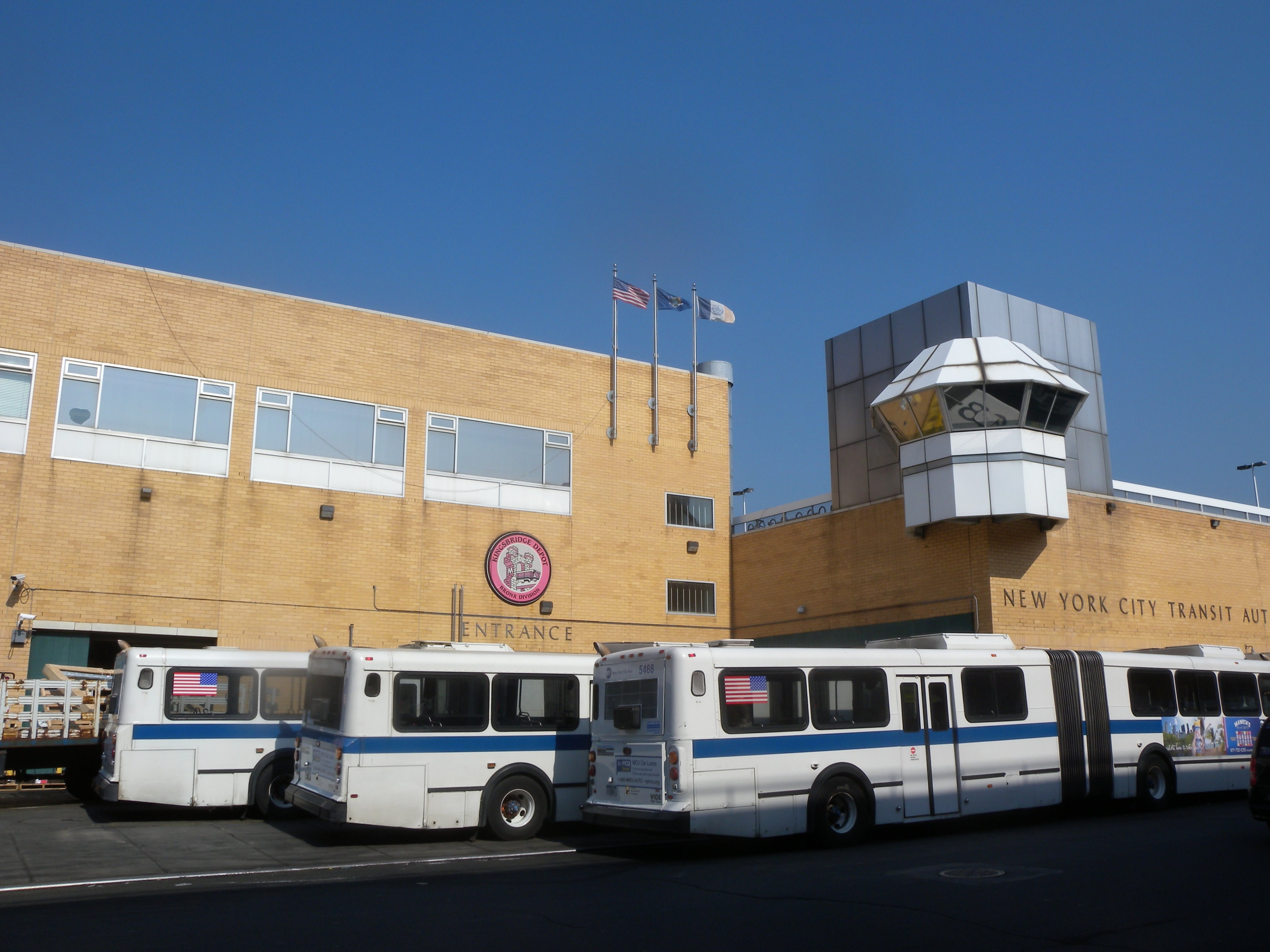
A 1999 D60HF (5468), and two others, at the east side of Kingsbridge Depot

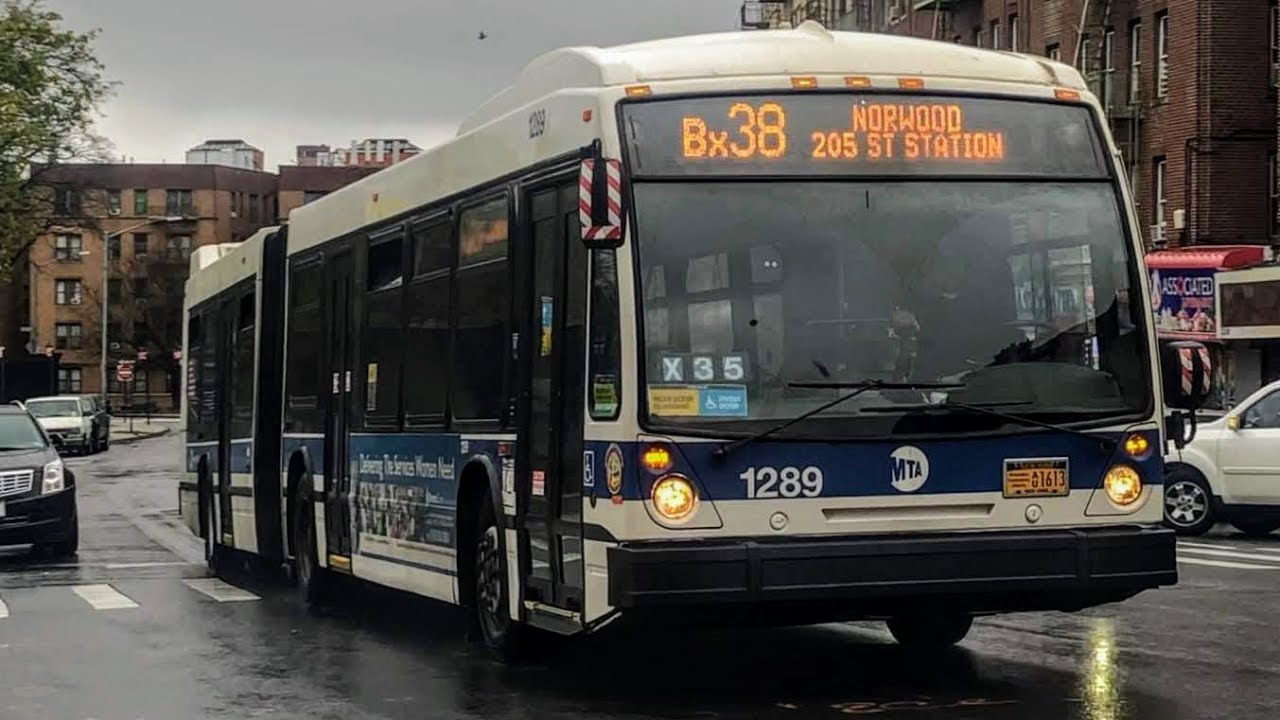
A 2010 Nova Bus LFS Articulated (1289) on the Norwood-bound Bx38

The Kingsbridge Depot is located in at 4055-4060 Ninth Avenue in Inwood, Manhattan (40.870190°N 73.912521°W) and stretches nearly two square blocks, from Tenth Avenue to the Harlem River and from 216th Street to 218th Street. The current facility opened on February 23, 1993, and consists of two separate buildings: one for maintenance (the Ninth Avenue Shop) and one for bus storage. The Ninth Avenue shop rebuilds individual bus components. It was the first in the city to house articulated buses beginning on September 30, 1996. The roof of the depot is a public parking facility.

The site of the depot was originally the Kingsbridge Car Barn, a streetcar barn owned by the Third Avenue Railway in 1897. This was a one-story brick structure with a basement and steel frame designed in Roman renaissance style with terracotta features. Among its designers included Isaac A. Hopper, who constructed Carnegie Hall. Across from the barn on the east side of Ninth Avenue was the Kingsbridge Power House, which was constructed around the same time and supplied electricity to the Third Avenue system. It was designed and built by Westinghouse Electric Corporation and by Hopper, with similar brick and terracotta features.

The facility became the location of the company's central repair shop in 1947 when the 65th Street Shops closed. In 1948, Third Avenue's central repair shop was moved again to a facility in Yonkers, while the Kingsbridge Depot ceased serving trolleys and began serving buses in 1948. In 1962, it was acquired by the MaBSTOA. The original 1897 depot closed on September 10, 1989, when the Gun Hill Depot opened, and was razed soon after. It had fallen into disrepair and the placement of its support columns was inconvenient for bus movements in the building.

==== Fleet ====
- Nova Bus LFS 4G
- Nova Bus LFS HEV 3G
- Nova Bus LFSe+
- Nova Bus LFSA
- Nova Bus LFSA 2G
- New Flyer XD60

==== Routes ====
- Local Routes: Bx3, Bx7, Bx10, Bx13, Bx18A/Bx18B, Bx20, M100, Bx28 (A.M. rush only, shared with Gun Hill, also runs with articulated buses)
- Articulated Local Routes: Bx1, Bx2, Bx9, Bx15, Bx12 (summer only, shared with Gun Hill)

=== West Farms Depot (CNG) ===
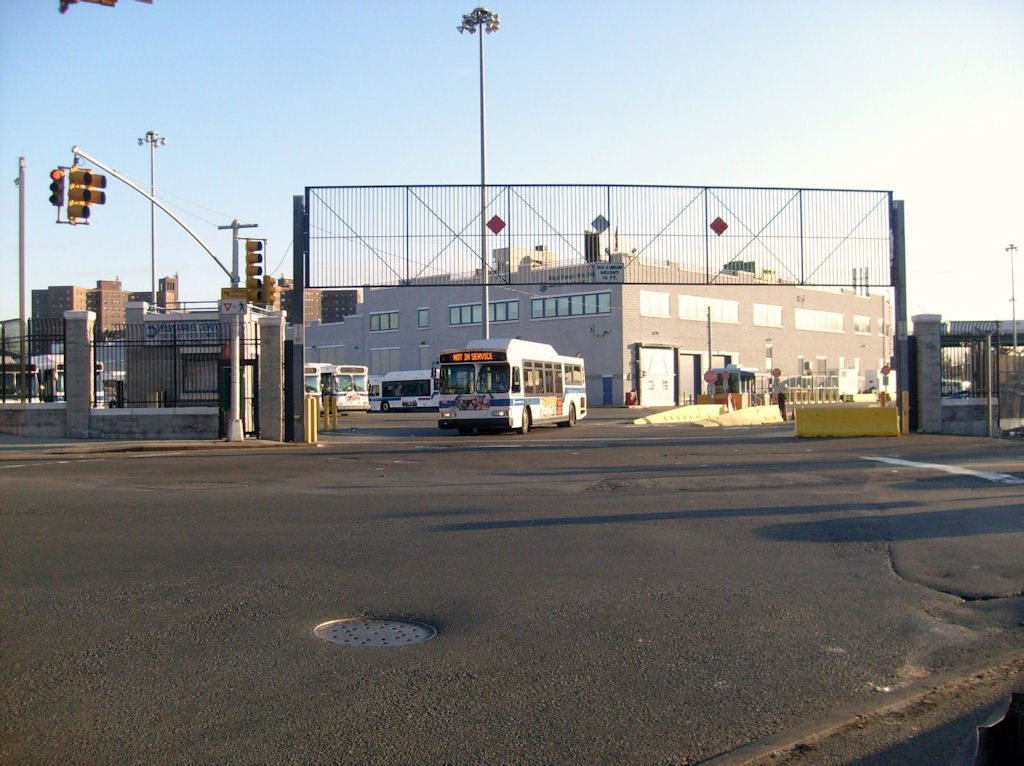
West Farms Depot in the Bronx, with an Orion VII CNG signed up as “Not in Service” exiting.

The West Farms Depot is located along East 177th Street and next to the northern end of Sheridan Boulevard at its interchange with the Cross Bronx Expressway (40.837525°N 73.877744°W), in the West Farms section of the Bronx. The site is bounded by 177th Street at its north end, is just south of East Tremont Avenue (also called Hector Lavoe Boulevard) and to the west by the Bronx River, Devoe Avenue, and nearby West Farms Square to the northwest. The depot opened on September 7, 2003, on the site of the former Coliseum Depot. It is one of five compressed natural gas (CNG) Depots in the Buses system, along with Jackie Gleason, Spring Creek, Zerega, and College Point facilities, and previously one of seven CNG depots, until the transfer of the Rockville Centre and Mitchel Field depots to the new Nassau Inter-County Express (NICE) system in 2012, when Nassau County privatized the former MTA Long Island Bus division and started five years of cutting services and routes to reduce operating budget deficits.

Originally, the site was an amusement park called Starlight Park, which hosted the Bronx International Exposition of Science, Arts and Industries in 1918. In 1928, the park operators received the auditorium from the 1926 Sesquicentennial Exposition in Philadelphia, which became the New York Coliseum. The coliseum and park went into receivership in 1940, and the coliseum was used as a vehicle maintenance center for the United States Army during World War II. It was acquired by the Third Avenue Railway in April 1946, and was converted into a bus depot and repair shop for the successor Surface Transportation Corporation around 1950. The company also operated a second facility nearby, at what is now West Farms Road and the Cross Bronx Expressway. Surface Transit was taken over by New York City Omnibus Corporation in 1956, and the depot became municipally operated when its parent company Fifth Avenue Coach folded in 1962. The Coliseum Depot closed in 1995 and was demolished in 1997, while a new CNG-compatible facility was constructed as part of the MTA's 1995-1999 Capital Program. This included a "fast-fill" CNG filling station at the cost of $7.3 million. It became the second NYCT depot to facilitate CNG when it opened in 2003. Not all buses assigned to West Farms run on CNG.

==== Fleet ====
- New Flyer C40LF
- New Flyer XD40
- New Flyer XN40
- Nova Bus LFS 4G
- Nova Bus LFSA
- New Flyer XN60
- New Flyer XD60

==== Routes ====
- Local Routes: Bx8, Bx11, Bx17, Bx21, Bx27, Bx31, Bx32, Bx33, Bx46
- Articulated Local/SBS Routes: Bx6/Bx6 SBS, Bx19, Bx35, Bx36

=== Yonkers Depot (MTA Bus) ===
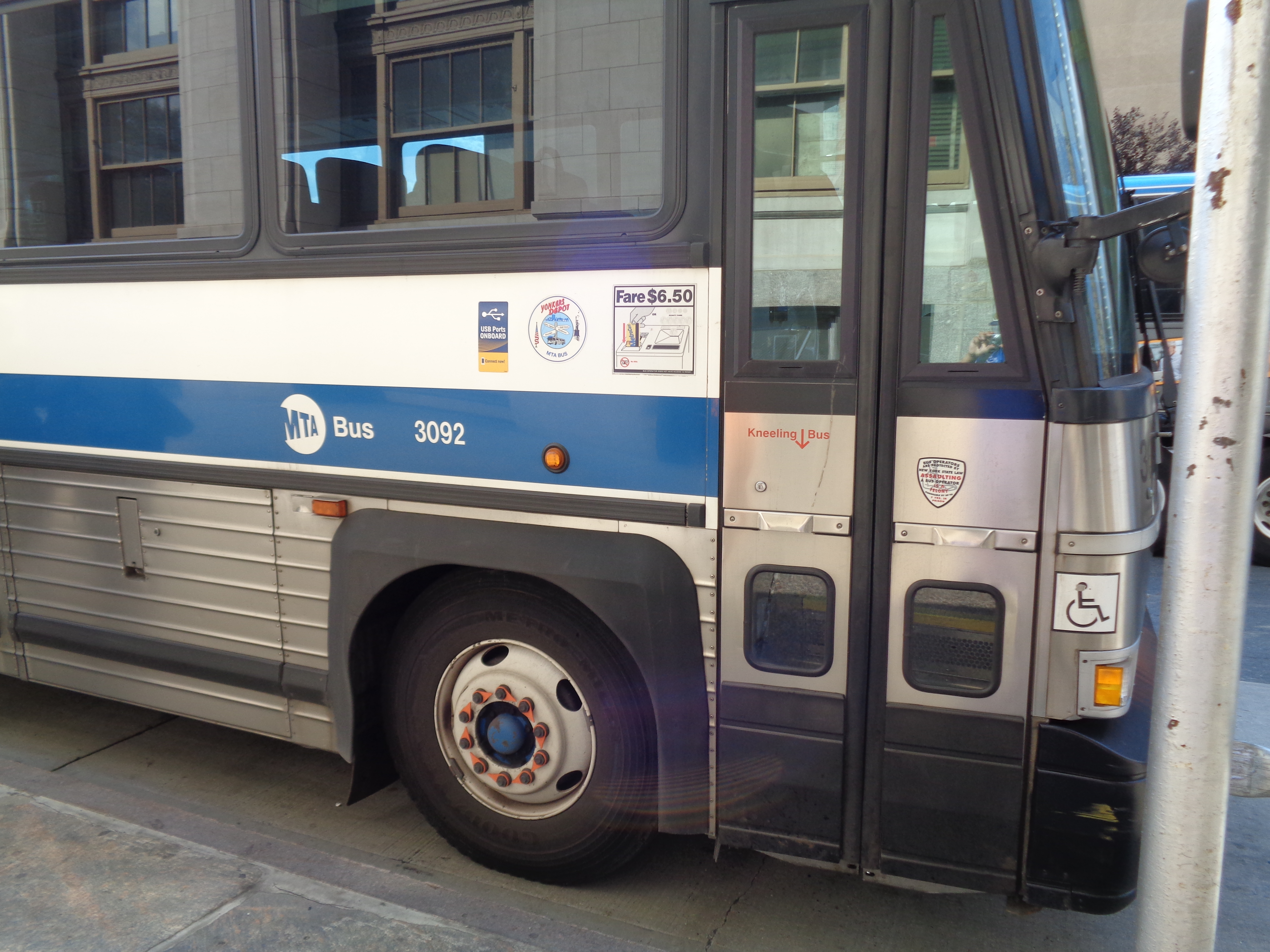
A 2005 MCI D4500CL (3092) operating for Yonkers Depot

The Yonkers Depot is located at 59 Babcock Place at the foot of Alexander Street in the Getty Square section of Yonkers, New York (40.943364°N 73.900463°W), near the facilities of Greyston Bakery. The site was initially a freight yard for the adjacent Hudson Line, used by the New York Central Railroad. The depot was originally built by Gray Lines Tours for Riverdale Transit Corp, which later became a part of the Liberty Lines Express system. It is currently owned by New York City and leased to MTA Bus Company, sold by Liberty Lines on January 3, 2005, for $10.5 million. The depot consists of an administration building, a shop for bus maintenance and repairs, and an outdoor parking lot used for storing 80 express buses. The buses from the depot provide express service between Yonkers or Western Bronx and Manhattan. The city of Yonkers plans to acquire at least a portion of the site from the MTA, as part of the redevelopment of the waterfront area, a former industrial section. After a bus crashed in Yonkers, mayor Mike Spano asked for the depot to be moved into the Bronx.

==== Fleet ====
- MCI D4500CL
- MCI D4500CT
- Prevost X3-45 2G

==== Routes ====
- Express Routes: BxM1, BxM2, BxM3, BxM4, BxM11, BxM18

== Brooklyn Division ==
All depots that are part of the Brooklyn Division are represented by TWU local 100 and operated by New York City Transit.

=== East New York Depot ===
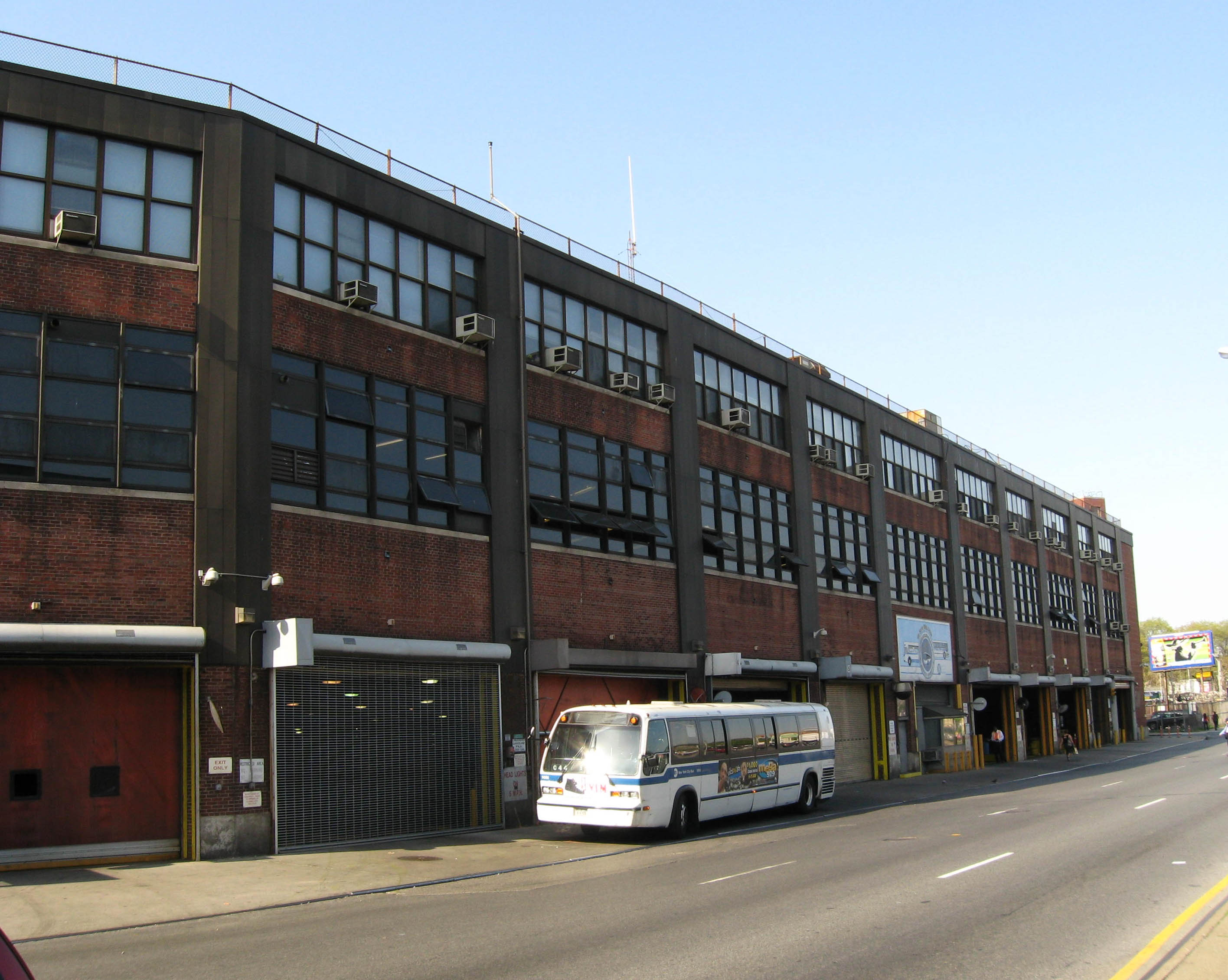
A 1996 Nova Bus RTS-06 (9086) at the Jamaica Avenue side of East New York Depot

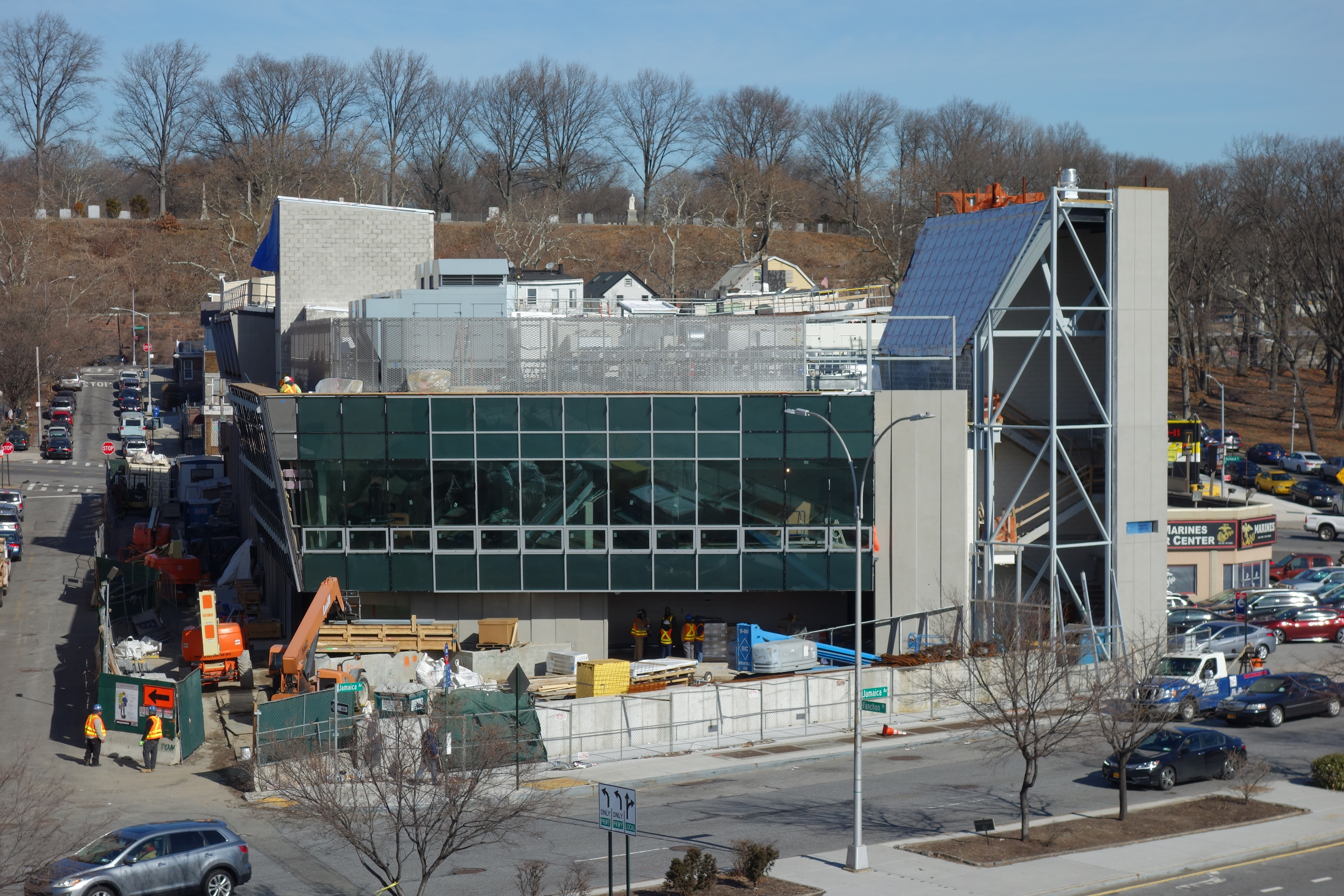
The new bus command center under construction in 2018

The East New York Depot, also called the East New York Base Shops, is located at One Jamaica Avenue/25 Jamaica Avenue at Bushwick Avenue in the Broadway Junction area of East New York, Brooklyn (40.678063°N 73.899747°W), just east of the New York City Subway's East New York Yard. The five-story structure is steel-framed with a brick exterior, with two stories for bus storage and repair shops. The facility was built to perform heavy maintenance, and served as New York City Bus' central maintenance facility until the opening of the Zerega and Grand Avenue facilities. Buses enter and exit the complex via numerous doors on Jamaica Avenue, with an additional vehicle entrance at the north end of the complex at Bushwick Avenue. The depot was built to house over 300 buses. It currently has space for around 280 buses, including two additional outdoor parking lots south of the depot: Havens Lot at Havens Place between Herkimer Street and Atlantic Avenue, and Herkimer Lot at Herkimer Street and Williams Place underneath the BMT Canarsie Line. The depot also features a paint shop, which is decommissioned and has been used to store buses at times. The north end of the depot (1720 Bushwick Avenue) is used to maintain the museum bus fleet along with Amsterdam Depot, and contains a repair shop for MTA Bus. Also, work is underway to modify this depot to accommodate articulated-buses for use in the very near future.

The original building on the site was a trolley car barn for the Broadway Railroad's Broadway streetcar line, opened in 1859. The barn began serving buses in 1931, and was acquired by the city during unification in 1940. Construction on the current bus depot began in 1947. The depot was built on top of the subway tunnel roof of the IND Fulton Street Line, which had been built in the early 1940s. The depot opened on December 17, 1950. The trolley barn was replaced by the current depot on October 30, 1956, when Brooklyn streetcar service ended.

Also located at the facility is the MTA's bus command center, also known as the East New York Administration Building. The brick structure built along with the current depot is located at the west end of the bus depot, facing Fulton Street at the foot of Alabama Avenue. The center was expanded in 1962, and again in 1969. The MTA plans to construct a new command center across from the depot, to the east of the current complex. The contract for the project was awarded on June 26, 2015.

==== Fleet ====
- OBI Orion VII NG HEV
- New Flyer XD40
- New Flyer XDE40
- New Flyer XE40 NG

==== Routes ====
- Local/SBS Routes: B12, B14, B15, B17, B25, B42, B45, B65, B82/B82 SBS, B83, B84, Q24, Q56

=== Flatbush Depot ===
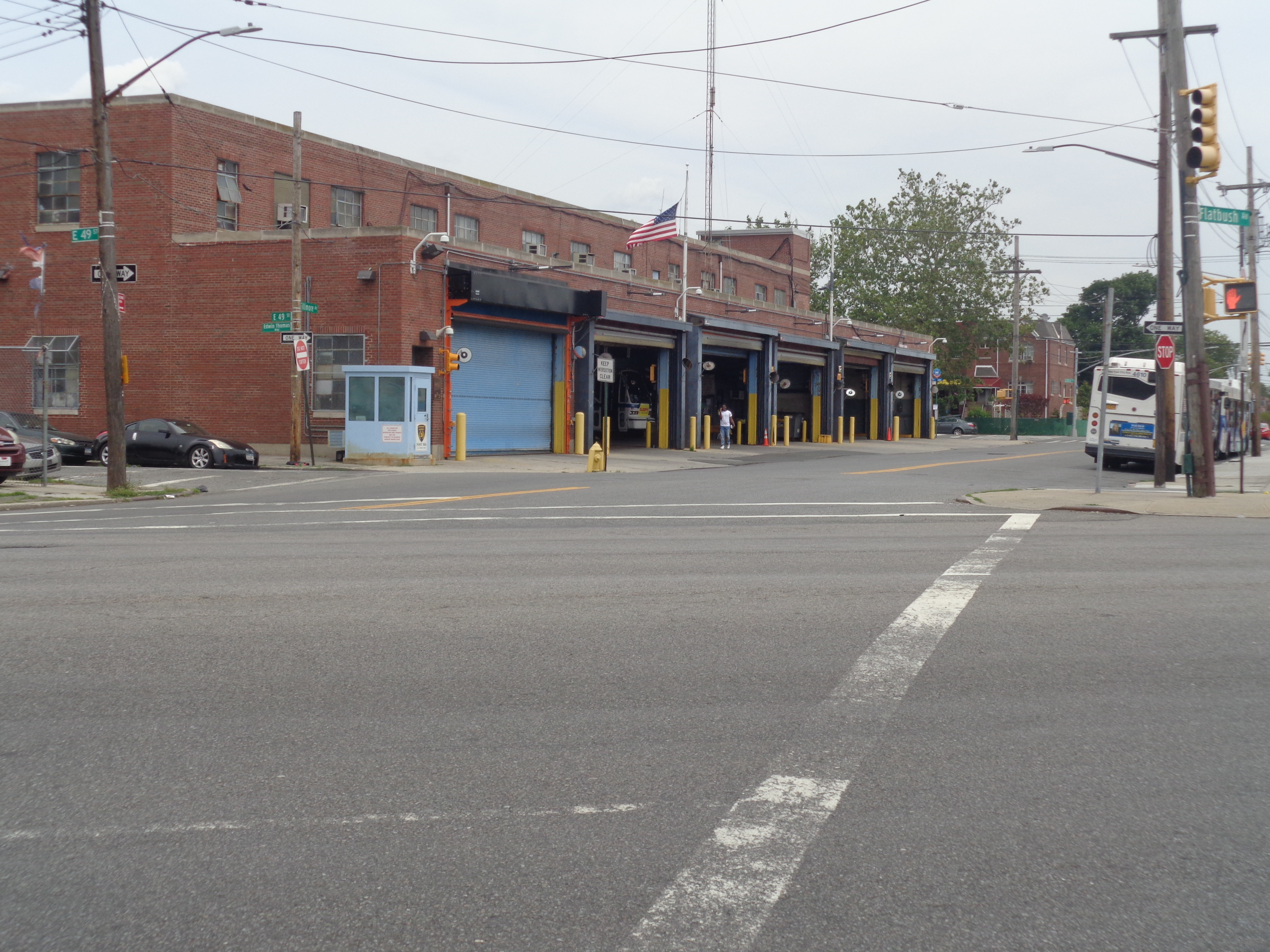
A 1998 Nova Bus RTS-06 (4952) inside, and a 2009 Orion VII NG HEV (4610) and SBS-wrapped 2015 XD40 outside at Flatbush Depot, looking from Flatbush Avenue.

The Flatbush Depot is located at 4901 Fillmore Avenue in Flatlands, Brooklyn (40.615736°N 73.927059°W), near the Kings Plaza shopping center, where a number of bus routes terminate. The depot occupies two blocks just off Flatbush Avenue, bounded by Fillmore Avenue, East 49th Street, Avenue N, and Utica Avenue.

The Brooklyn Heights Railroad (part of the Brooklyn Rapid Transit Company) opened the depot in mid-1902 along its Flatbush Avenue Line (later the Bergen Beach Shuttle) on Avenue N. It eventually served a number of lines from the Flatbush area, including the Bergen Beach Shuttle, Flatbush Avenue Line, Nostrand Avenue Line, Ocean Avenue Line, and Utica Avenue Line. The barn began serving buses in 1931, and was acquired by the city in 1940. The depot was reconstructed under municipal operations in the late 1940s, designed by architect D. R. Collin of the BRT, and was intended to be the first of a new system-wide design. Few of the former BRT/BMT depots were rebuilt to match such designs. Only Ulmer Park Depot's garage building somewhat matches his new architectural design. The new Flatbush Depot opened for bus service on January 15, 1950, along with Ulmer Park Depot. An adjacent parking lot was added in 1965, and the depot was rehabilitated in 1991. In 2009, the depot became the first to dispatch buses equipped with Plexiglas partitions to protect drivers, after the December 1, 2008 murder of Edwin Thomas, a bus driver who was operating a bus on the B46 Limited route when this incident occurred. This depot has also been modified to accommodate articulated buses, with the B44 Limited (now SBS) converted as of January 2013 and the B46 SBS in January 2020.

==== Fleet ====
- OBI Orion VII NG HEV
- OBI Orion VII EPA10
- New Flyer XD40
- New Flyer XD60
- Nova Bus LFSA 2G

==== Routes ====
- Local Routes: B2, B31, B41, B44, B46, B49
- Articulated SBS Routes: B44 SBS, B46 SBS

=== Fresh Pond Depot ===
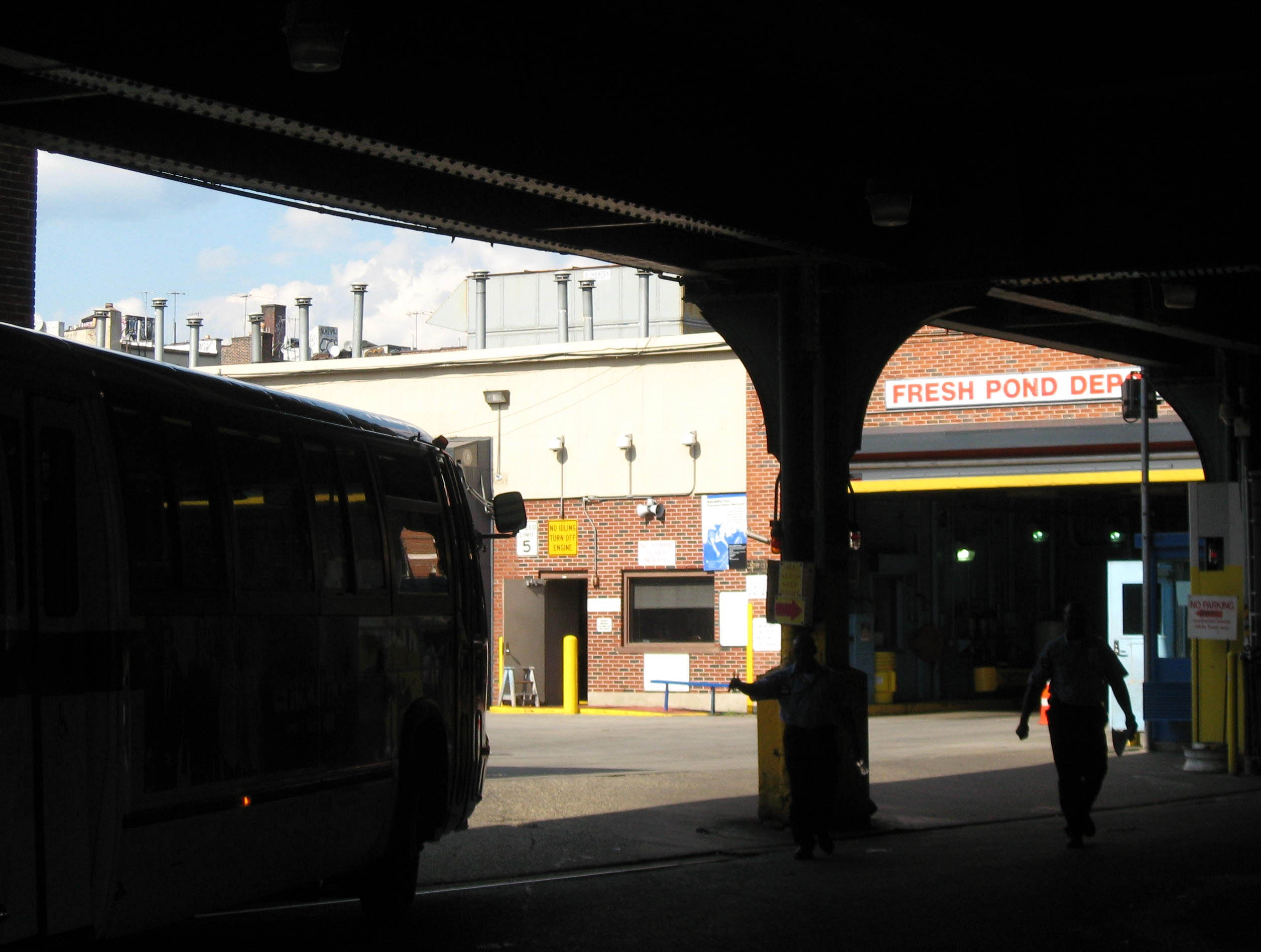
An RTS bus enters from Fresh Pond Road under Myrtle Avenue Line station

The Fresh Pond Depot is located at 66-99 Fresh Pond Road, on the east side of Fresh Pond Road south of Madison Street in Ridgewood, Queens (40.706400°N 73.896111°W), west of the adjacent Fresh Pond Yard of the New York City Subway. It was the site of a trolley depot called the Fresh Pond trolley yard, which was opened in 1907 by the Brooklyn Rapid Transit Company (BRT). In addition to repair shops, the barn hosted a "trolley car school" where new motormen were trained using a mockup of a streetcar's driver cabin. The trolley barn was acquired by the city in 1940, and was closed after the final trolley route from the depot, the Richmond Hill Line (today's Q55 bus), was motorized into trolley bus service on April 26, 1950. The barn was razed in 1957. Construction of the current bus depot by the Transit Authority began in March 1959. In June 1959, a contract was awarded to rebuild the BMT Myrtle Avenue Line to provide adequate clearance for the passage of buses underneath to the depot. The new depot opened on July 27, 1960, at the cost of $2 million. The new depot was built to be 250 feet (76 m) wide by 500 feet (150 m) long. The initial capacity of the depot was 185 buses. The construction of the depot was required due to the loss of the West 5th Street Depot. In addition, the new depot replaced the Maspeth Trackless Trolley Depot, and Bergen Street depots located in Brooklyn. The new garage featured automatic fueling and washing facilities. The depot is currently assigned around 200 buses, but has been assigned as many as 262 in the past.

The depot and subway yard are located in an area once known as Fresh Pond, named for two freshwater ponds located just north of Metropolitan Avenue.

==== Fleet ====
- New Flyer XD40

==== Routes ====
- Standard Routes: B7, B13, B20, B26, B47, B52, B54, B60, Q14, Q54, Q55

=== Grand Avenue Depot ===
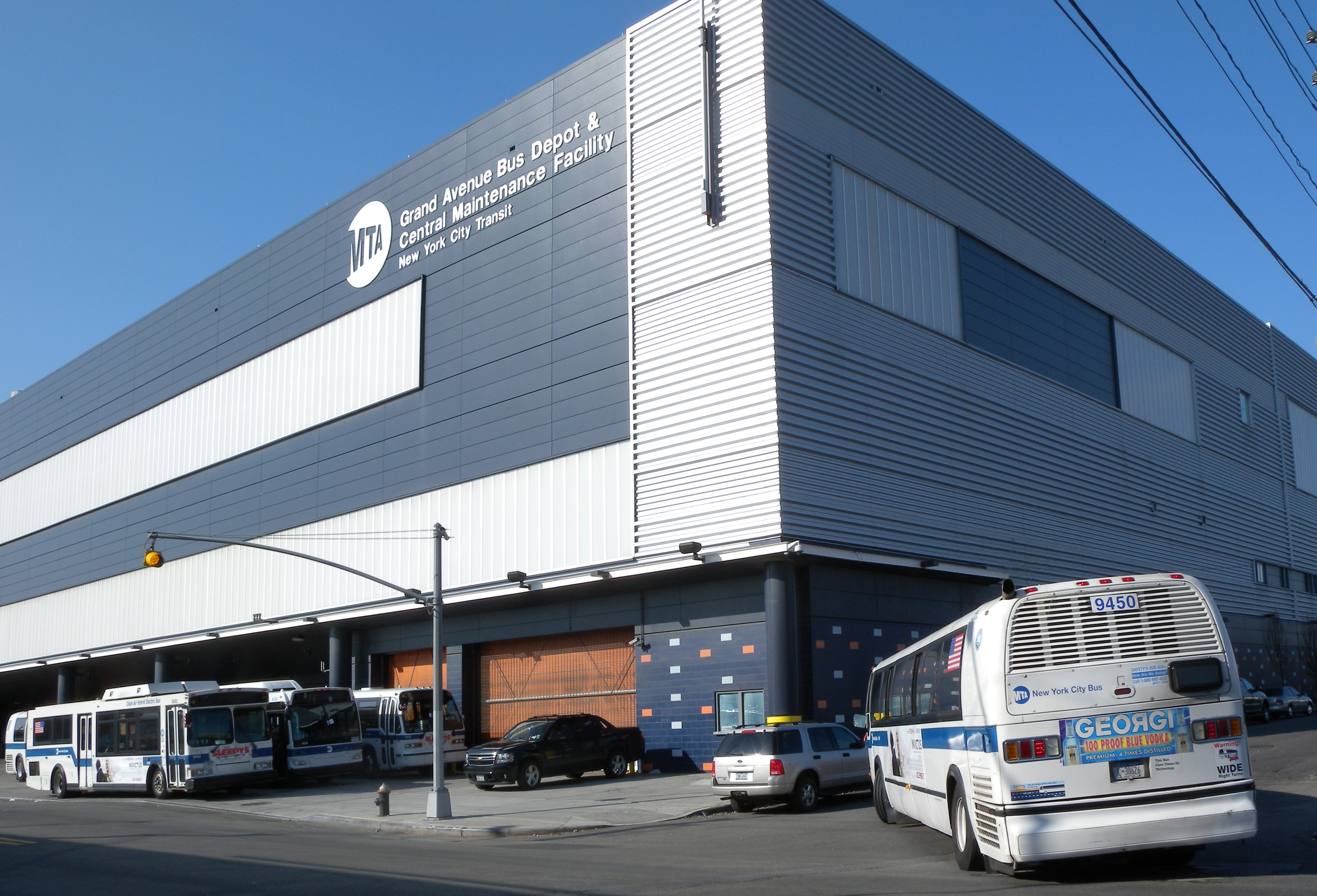
A 1998 Nova Bus RTS-06 (9450) joins two more RTSs, an Orion VII OG HEV, and an Orion VII NG HEV at Grand Avenue Depot

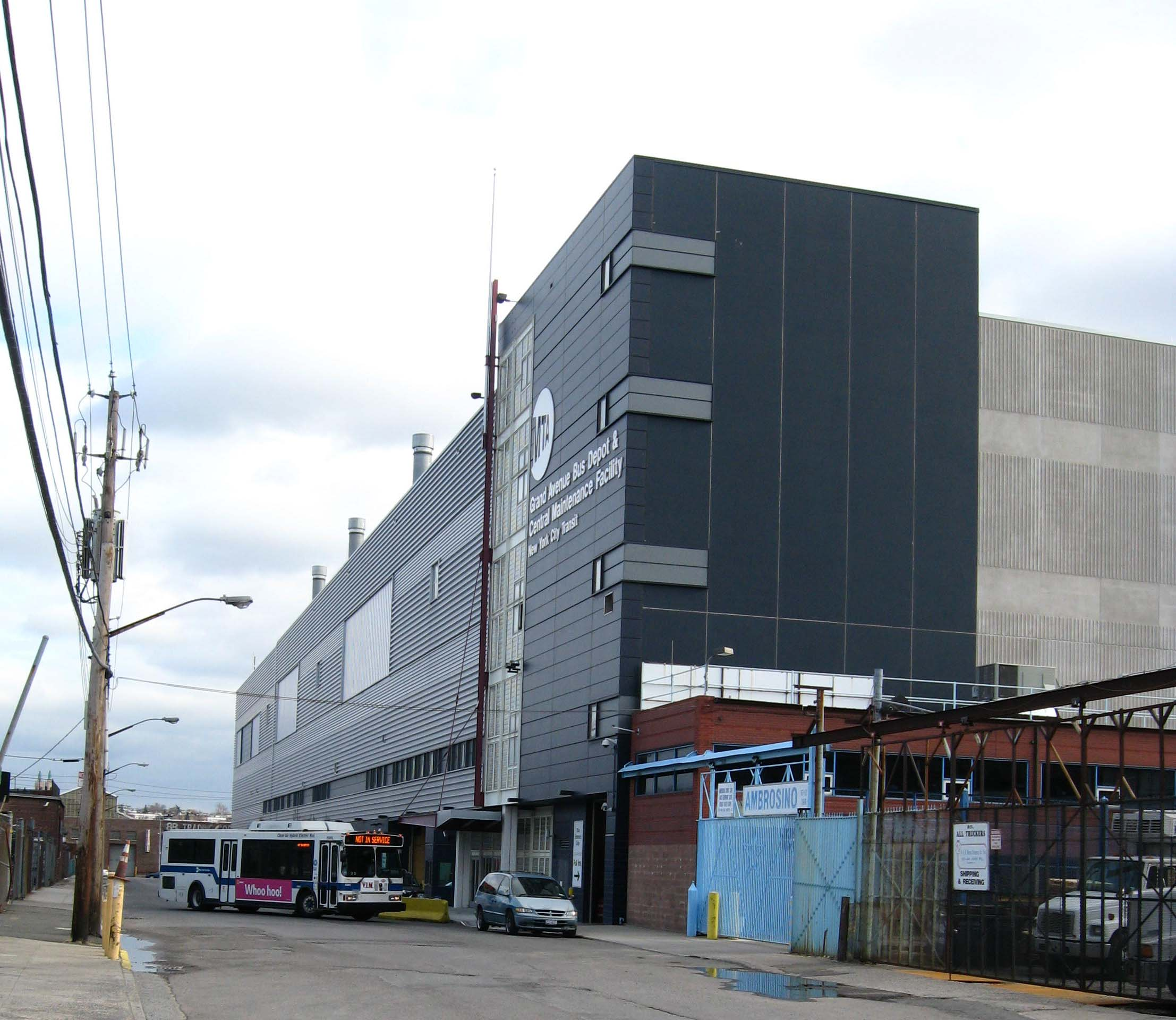
An Orion VII OG HEV displaying “Not in Service” at Grand Avenue Depot

An XDE40 (5050) on the Q39 bus on Thomson Avenue bound for Queens Plaza

The Grand Avenue Depot is located between 47th Street and 49th Place on the north side of Grand Avenue in Maspeth, Queens (40.717615°N 73.919722°W), on the former site of a car rental business, and near the south end of the Newtown Creek. This modern 600,000 square feet (56,000 m^{2}) and environmentally friendly facility is the first of its kind for New York City Transit Authority. The contract for the depot was awarded in 2003 to Granite Construction Northeast, with the design created by Gannett Fleming. The facility partially opened in 2007 housing 19 buses, and fully opened on January 6, 2008. Upon opening, the Grand Avenue Depot took on many routes and buses from the nearby Fresh Pond Depot, relieving overcrowding at that facility. The building design is certified Environmental Management Systems ISO 14001 specifications.

The four-story building includes four fueling and defueling stations, cleaning and storage facilities for 200 buses on the first floor, an advanced 27 bus central maintenance facility on the second floor, administrative offices for NYCT's Department of Buses on the third floor, and parking garages for MTA employees on the roof. The central maintenance facility is able to repair and maintain the newer fleet of diesel, diesel hybrid-electric, 60-foot (18 m) articulated, express coach and compressed natural gas (CNG) buses, and has expanded the capabilities of the current East New York central maintenance facility for Brooklyn and Queens. The facility also has four environmentally friendly paint booths − self-contained units that avoid the spread of contaminants.

The building meets the needs of expanding demands, and relief of the overcrowding at the Brooklyn Division's other six existing bus garages, and upgrading the Department of Buses' facilities to be state-of-the-art from both environmental and technological standpoints. Also, work to modify this depot to accommodate articulated-buses has been completed, with the B38 converted as of September 1, 2019, and work on electrically powered buses has also been completed.

==== Fleet ====
- New Flyer XD40
- New Flyer XDE40
- New Flyer XE40 NG
- New Flyer XD60

==== Routes ====
- Standard Routes: B24, B32, B39, B48, B57, B62, Q29, Q39, Q59, Q67
- Articulated Route: B38

=== Jackie Gleason Depot (CNG) ===
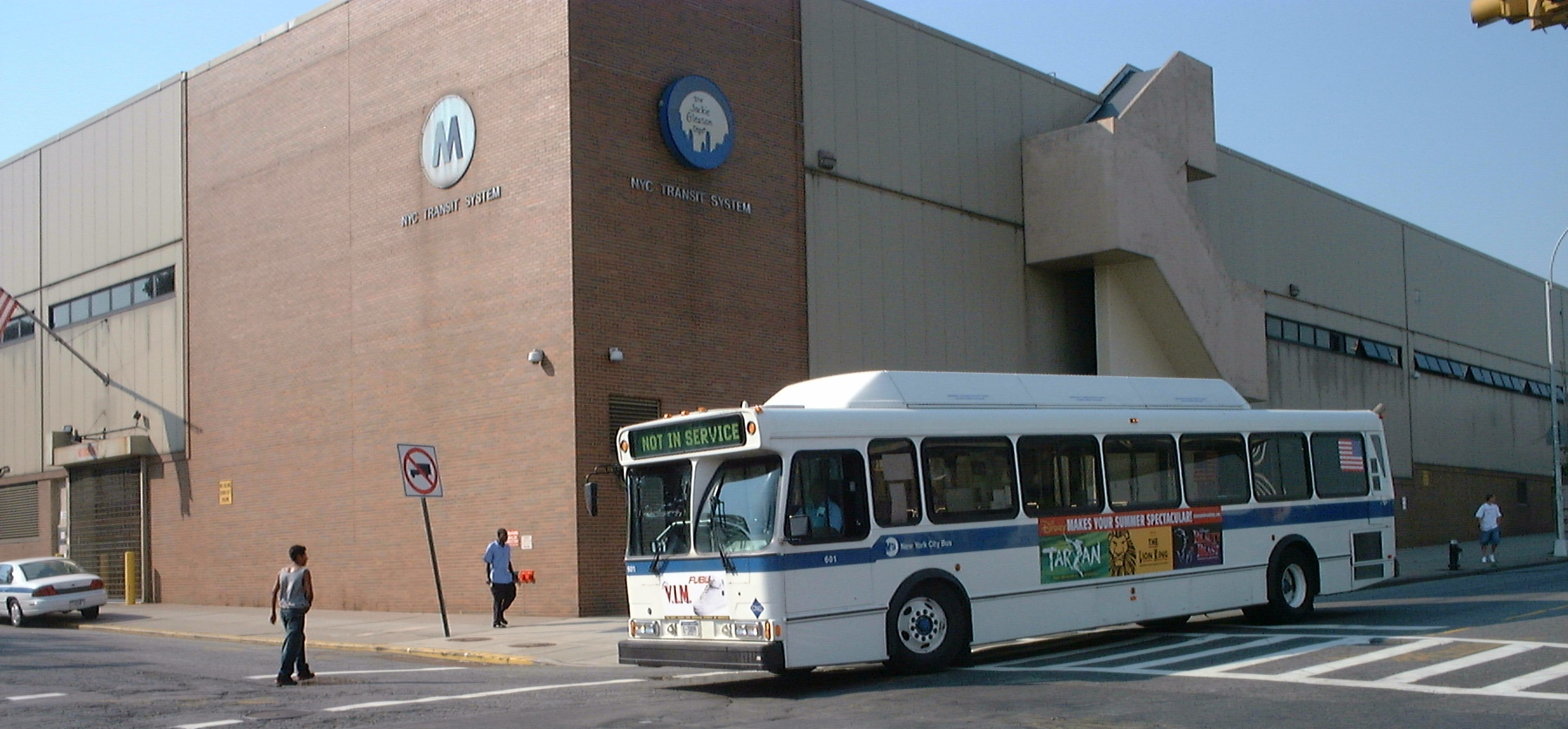
A 1995 Orion V CNG (601) at the northwest corner of Jackie Gleason Depot

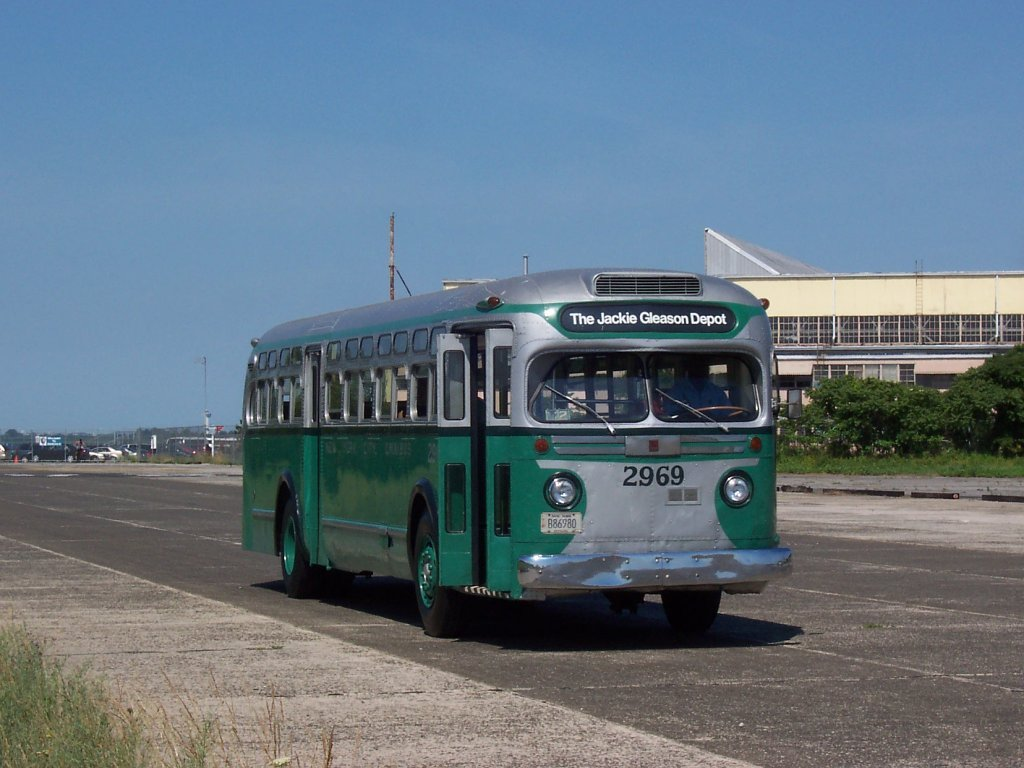
The Honeymooners-themed museum bus (Omnibus GMC 2969) bearing the depot's name.

The Jackie Gleason Depot, called the Fifth Avenue Depot until June 30, 1988, is located on the east side of Fifth Avenue between 36th and 39th Streets in Sunset Park, Brooklyn (40.651932°N 74.001923°W), just west of the 36th-38th Street Yard and Ninth Avenue station of the New York City Subway. The depot had been a passenger terminal named Union Station. Steam trains ran from some of the outlying parts of Downtown Brooklyn where they then continued their journey into Manhattan. Following that, it operated as an elevated car inspection shop from sometime in the early 1900s until approximately 1940, when it was acquired by the city's Board of Transportation. In 1944, it began operation as a bus garage called Fifth Avenue Depot. In 1959, the depot was equipped with heaters to circulate hot water through the heating and cooling systems of buses that had to be stored outside due to the lack of storage space. The depot was later rebuilt, and it opened on September 6, 1984. On June 30, 1988, the depot was renamed after Jackie Gleason, who grew up in Brooklyn and played bus driver Ralph Kramden in The Honeymooners; this renaming occurred one year after Gleason's death. The depot later housed a bus built in 1949 similar to that used on the show, part of the New York Transit Museum fleet.

The depot facilitated the first testing of compressed natural gas (CNG) buses in 1992, when a dual-fueled CNG/Diesel bus was housed in the facility. The bus was fueled at the Brooklyn Union Gas Company facility in Greenpoint, Brooklyn. In November 1995, the NYCTA installed a fueling station (leased from Brooklyn Union) at the cost of $1.6 million for several Transportation Manufacturing Corporation (TMC) RTS-06 CNG buses and a fleet of BIA Orion 5.501 CNGs. The depot was fully equipped with CNG on June 7, 1999, with the original "slow-fill" fueling station replaced with a "fast-fill" station. It became the first NYCTA depot to support CNG buses. Also, this depot has been modified to accommodate articulated buses, with the B35 converted as of September 1, 2018.

==== Fleet ====
- New Flyer C40LF
- New Flyer XN40
- New Flyer XN60

==== Routes ====
- Local Routes: B4, B8, B9, B11, B16, B37, B43, B61, B63, B67, B68, B69, B70
- Articulated Local Route: B35

=== Ulmer Park Depot ===
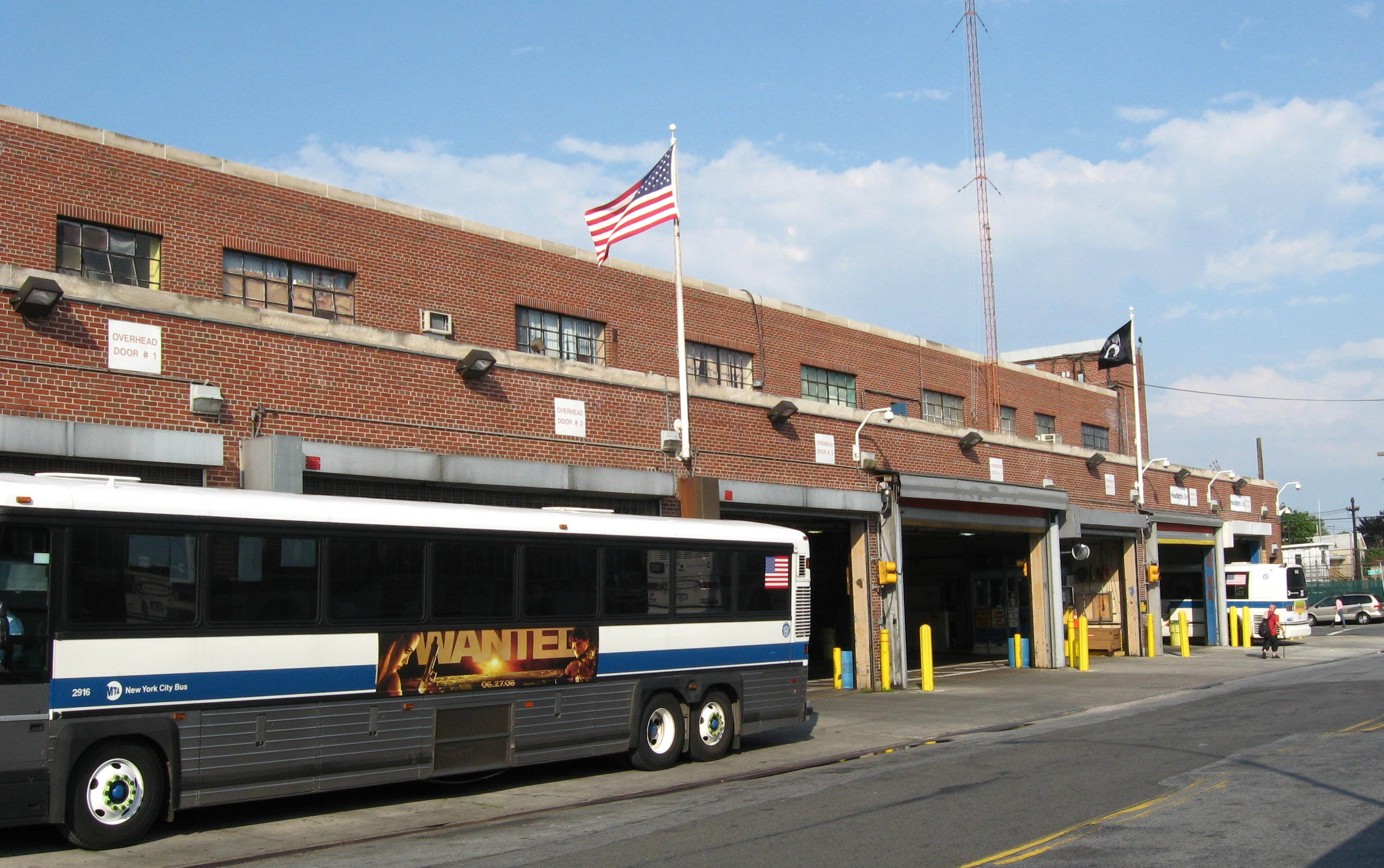
A 2002 Motor Coach D4500CL (2916) outside, and an RTS inside, at Ulmer Park Depot

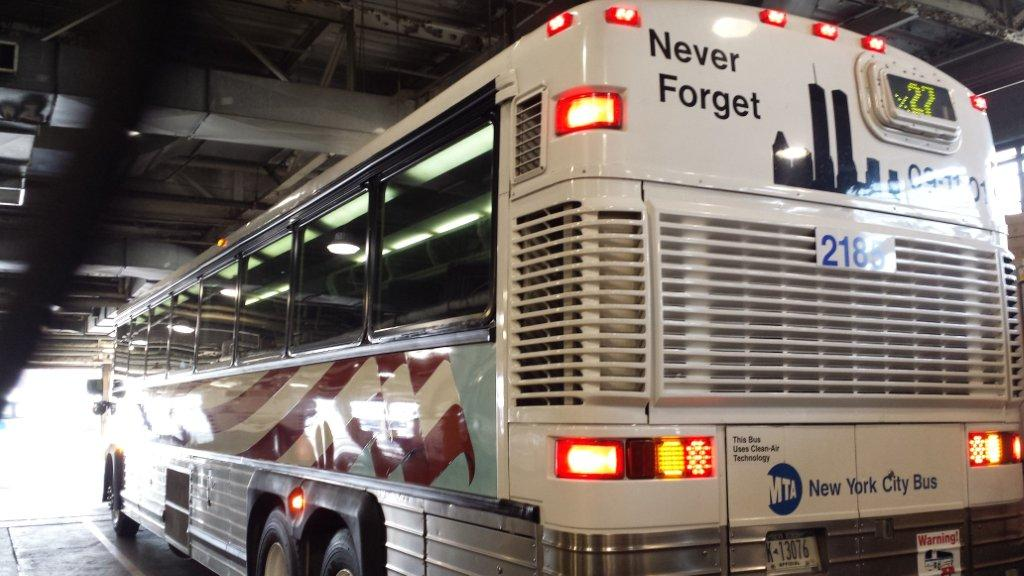
The repaired 2001 Motor Coach D4500CL #2185 inside the depot in 2013, in remembrance of 9/11

The Ulmer Park Depot is located at 2449 Harway Avenue in the neighborhood of Bath Beach, Brooklyn (40.593874°N 73.992079°W). The depot fills the block bounded by 25th Avenue, Bay 38th Street (which is closed to the public), Harway Avenue, and Bath Avenue. Land for the depot was acquired in 1947, and the facility was constructed in the late 1940s, opening for operation on January 15, 1950. It is a single story 118,800-square-foot (11,040 m^{2}) steel-framed building with a brick exterior. It was rehabilitated in 1983 and 1989. This is the only NYCTA depot in Brooklyn to maintain express buses, storing a total of 285 buses. Ulmer Park is notable for rebuilding, repairing, and housing NYCT Bus 2185, a MCI express coach which was badly damaged during the September 11 attacks in 2001. This depot has also been modified to accommodate articulated buses, with the B1 converted as of June 2020.

The name Ulmer Park is a reference to the Ulmer Park resort, operated by William Ulmer of the William Ulmer Brewery in Bath Beach from 1893 to 1899.

==== Fleet ====
- New Flyer XD40
- New Flyer XD60
- Prevost X3-45

==== Routes ====
- Local Routes: B3, B6, B36, B64, B74
- School Trippers: B4, B9, B16 (shared with Jackie Gleason)
- Articulated Local Route: B1
- Express Routes: X27, X28, X37, X38

== Manhattan Division ==
The Manhattan and Bronx Surface Transit Operating Authority (MaBSTOA), a subsidiary of the New York City Transit brand, operates all of the local buses in Manhattan. All Manhattan bus depots are represented by TWU Local 100.

=== Amsterdam Depot ===
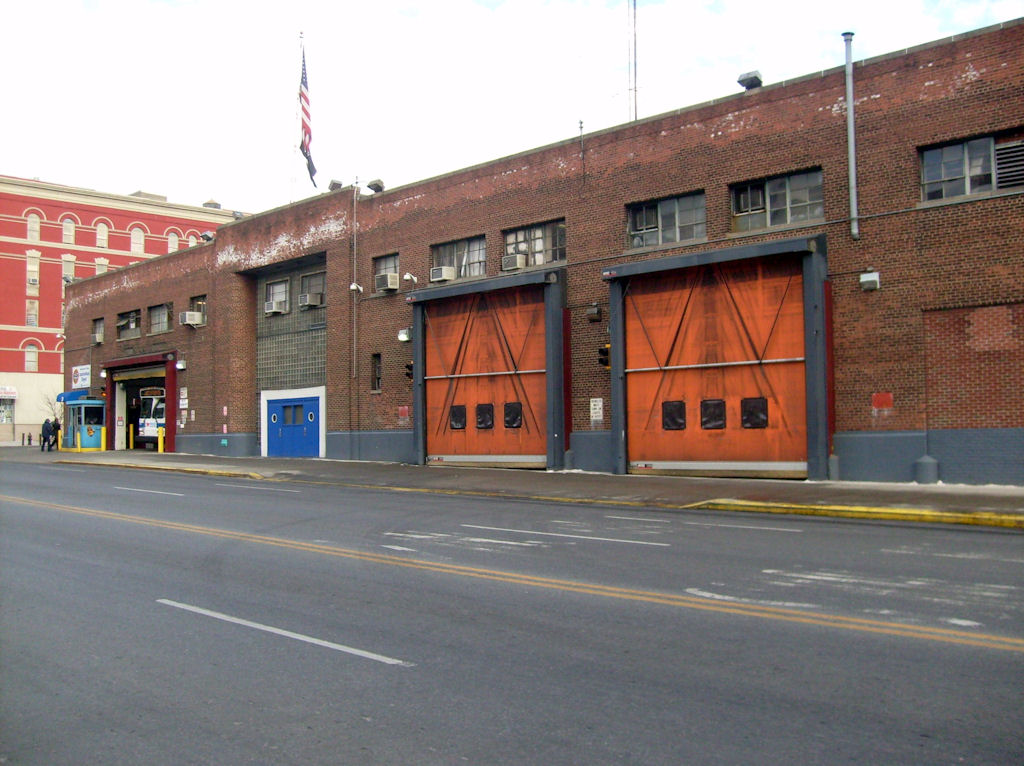
Amsterdam Depot at 129th Street and Amsterdam Avenue, Manhattan, with an Orion VII OG inside

Amsterdam Depot is located on the entire city block bounded by Amsterdam Avenue, Convent Avenue, and 128th and 129th Streets in Manhattanville, Manhattan (40.814246°N 73.955365°W), several blocks south of the City College of New York. It was built in 1882 as a trolley depot for the Third Avenue Railway. The last trolley was operated from the building on May 17, 1947. The building was then expanded and reopened as a bus garage by Surface Transit Inc., a subsidiary of the Fifth Avenue Coach Company. The MaBSTOA assumed the depot's operations in 1962. The MTA shut down the Amsterdam Depot's bus operations on September 7, 2003, the day the new 100th Street Depot (since renamed the Tuskegee Airmen Depot) opened. The depot was part of the Manhattan Division until spring 1998, when it was transferred to the Bronx Division due to the opening of the Michael J. Quill Depot and the closure of the Walnut Depot. On January 6, 2008, MTA reopened the depot temporarily because of a rehabilitation project at the Mother Clara Hale Depot. Amsterdam Depot closed on June 27, 2010, due to service cuts. The M1 and M7 routes were transferred to Manhattanville, while the M98 route went to Michael J. Quill Depot. This garage now houses and maintains most of the museum and vintage bus fleet.

=== Manhattanville Depot ===
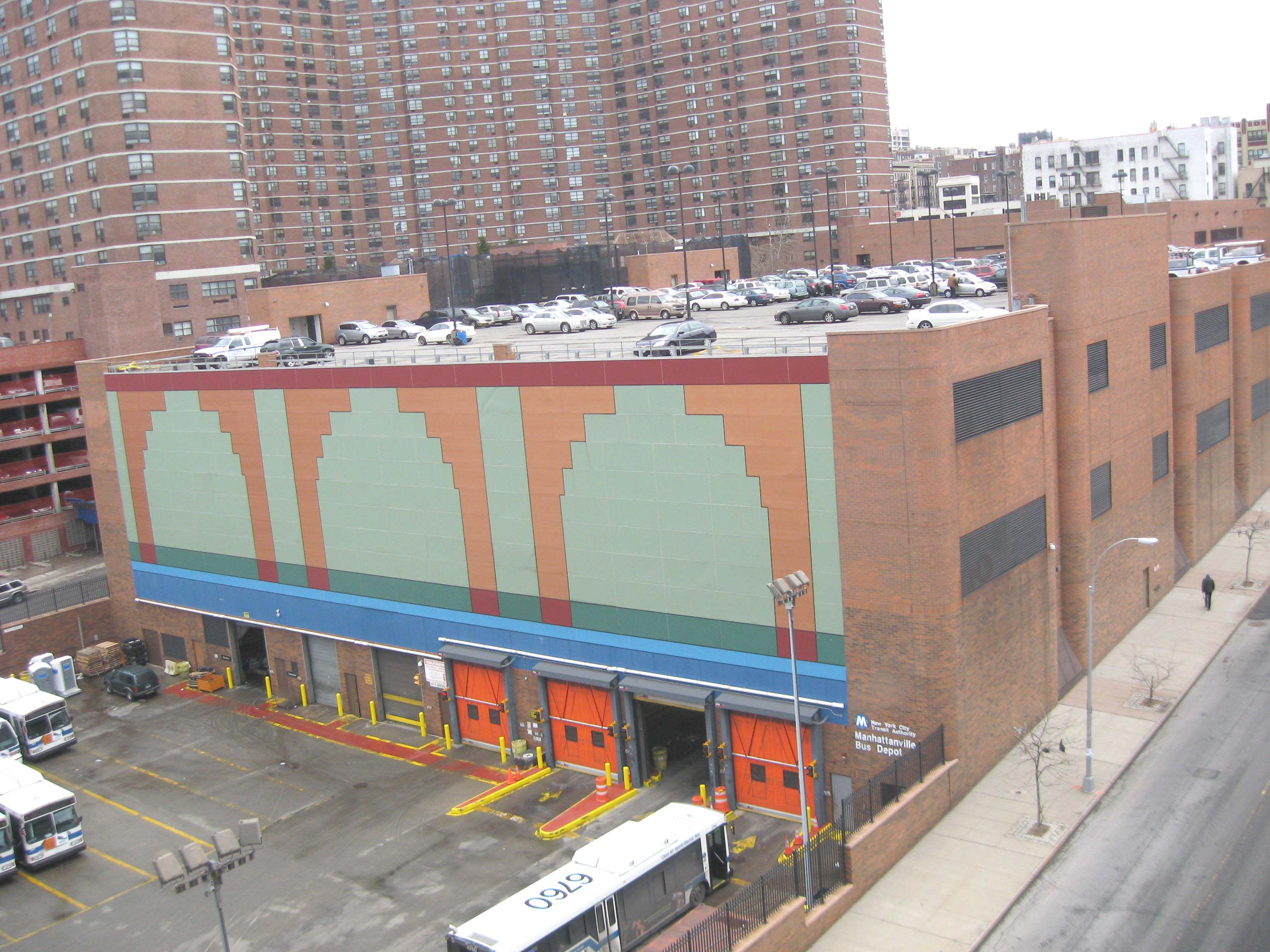
A 2006 Orion VII OG HEV (6760) at Manhattanville Depot, among other Orion HEVs and an RTS

The Manhattanville Depot, formerly the 132nd Street Depot, is a three-story structure located in the block bounded by Broadway, Riverside Drive, and 132nd and 133rd Streets in Manhattanville, Manhattan (40.819197°N 73.957060°W). The depot holds 192 buses, with storage space on the second and third floors. The original site on 132nd Street and Broadway was a streetcar barn built in 1918 for the Fifth Avenue Coach Company, which later used it for buses. The facility was taken over by the MaBSTOA subsidiary of the Transit Authority in March 1962. It served as the headquarters for the MaBSTOA. The original depot was demolished in the late 1980s, and a new depot was erected opening on November 8, 1992, replacing the old 54th Street Depot (also a former Fifth Avenue Coach facility) which closed the same day. In September 1998, the depot operated a pilot fleet of 10 Orion VI hybrid electric buses. Also that year, it was planned to convert the depot into a compressed natural gas (CNG) facility due to community complaints, but the plan was scrapped due to the high cost of converting such a large facility. Since 2010, Manhattanville Depot is one of the greenest bus depots in the city because it uses only Hybrid Electric Buses (excluding the M66 assignment in 2023). During rush hours, some of their buses are loaned to MaBSTOA’s Bronx depots.

==== Fleet ====
- OBI Orion VII NG HEV
- Nova Bus LFS HEV 3G
- New Flyer XDE40

==== Routes ====
- Local Routes: M2, M3, M4, M5, M10, M11, M96, M98, M104, M106, M116

=== Michael J. Quill Depot ===
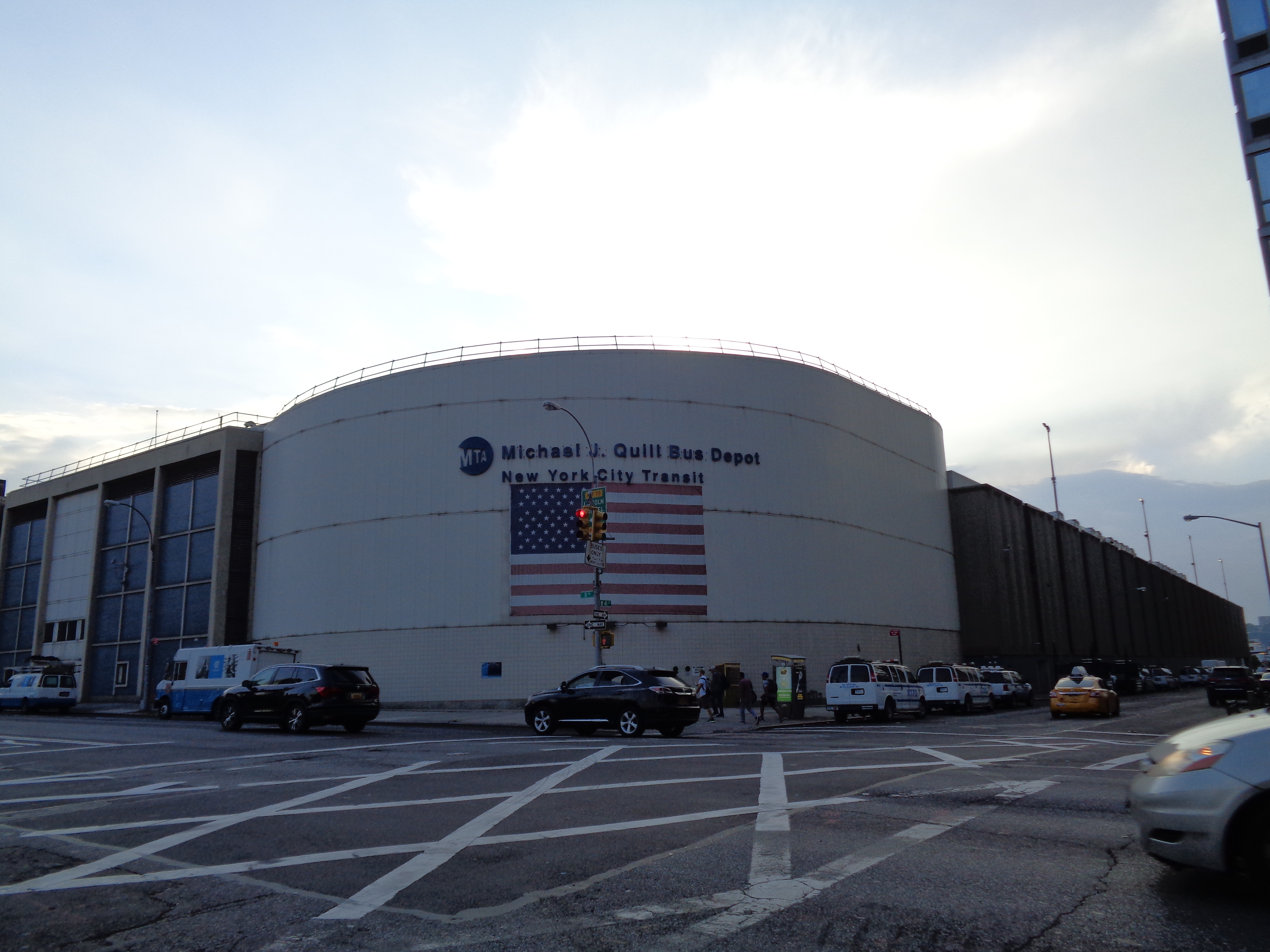
The drum-shaped ramps of the Michael J. Quill Depot

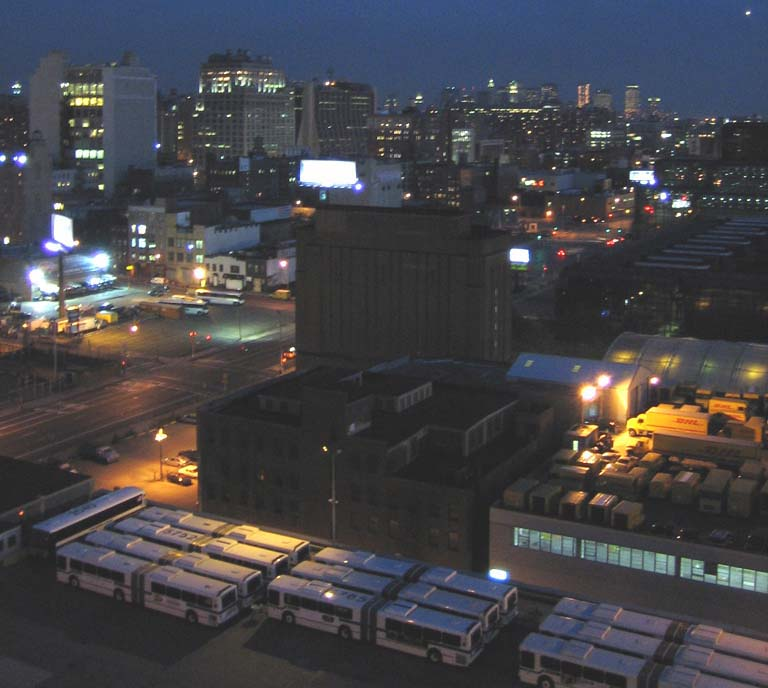
Bird's eye view of the depot at night, showing D60HFs (including 2003 units 5752 & 5765), and a Motor Coach D4500CL, on its rooftop parking lot

The Michael J. Quill Depot fills the block bounded by Eleventh Avenue, the West Side Highway, 40th Street, and 41st Street in Midtown Manhattan (40.760059°N 74.001671°W), near the Jacob K. Javits Convention Center, Hudson Yards, and the Port Authority Bus Terminal. The depot was originally the New York headquarters and bus garage for Greyhound Lines. Ground broke on the facility on April 26, 1966. It was designed by De Leuw, Cather, and Associates and built by Turner Construction. It was sold to the New York City Transit Authority in 1996. The Transit Authority renovated the facility at the cost of over $35 million. It opened for NYCT operations on March 29, 1998 as the Westside Depot, replacing the Walnut Depot and 100th Street Depot (the latter since reopened), and was renamed after Michael J. Quill, one of the founders of the Transport Workers Union of America, on July 13, 2000. The Michael J. Quill Bus Depot had received most of its routes from the defunct Hudson Pier Depot, which closed in 2003.

The Michael J. Quill Depot is the largest MTA depot in the city, consisting of three floors and rooftop parking for buses. It is known for a unique "drum-like" structure at the northeast corner of the site, which holds the ramps between the levels. Maintenance facilities are located on the first and second floors. It originally featured training and sleeping quarters for Greyhound drivers. The depot stores around 250 to 350 buses. It is also used for midday layovers for express buses from other boroughs, with additional layover areas nearby in Midtown. The depot was proposed to be relocated to a site on the west side between West 30th and 31st Streets, as part of a planned expansion of the Javits Center, which was slated to be completed by 2010 but never fully commenced. In 2019, Michael J. Quill became the first depot to permanently operate zero-emissions buses, with the debut of the New Flyer XE60 on the M14A/D SBS.

==== Fleet ====
- New Flyer XD40
- New Flyer XDE40
- New Flyer XE40 NG
- Nova Bus LFS HEV 3G
- New Flyer XD60
- New Flyer XE60
- New Flyer XE60 NG
- Nova Bus LFSA 2G

==== Routes ====
- Local Routes: M8, M9, M12, M20, M21, M22, M42, M50, M55, M57, M66, M72
- School Tripper: M11 (shared with Manhattanville)
- Articulated SBS routes: M14A/M14D SBS, M23 SBS, M34/M34A SBS, M60 SBS, M79 SBS, M86 SBS

=== Mother Clara Hale Depot ===
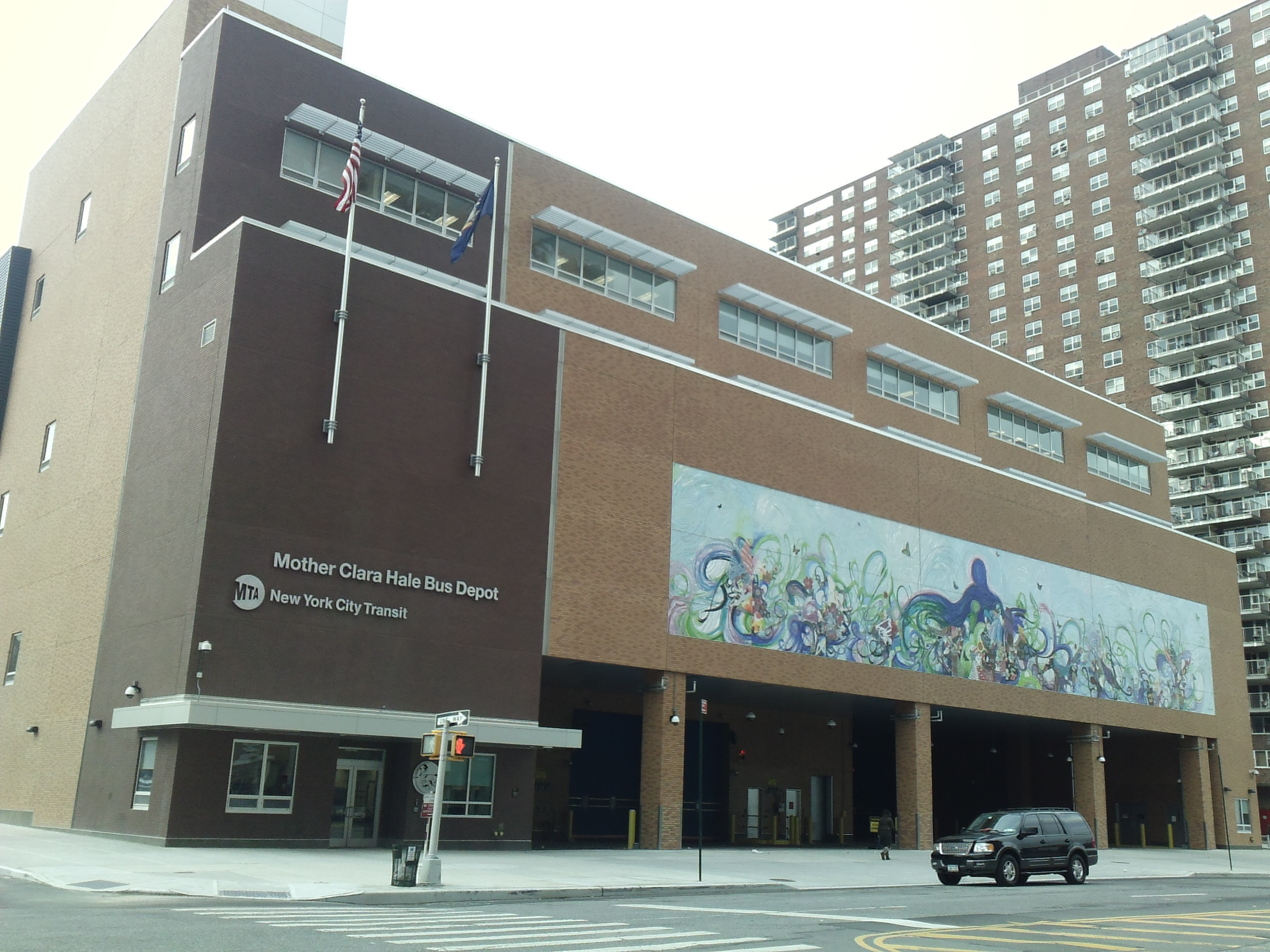
Mother Clara Hale Bus Depot

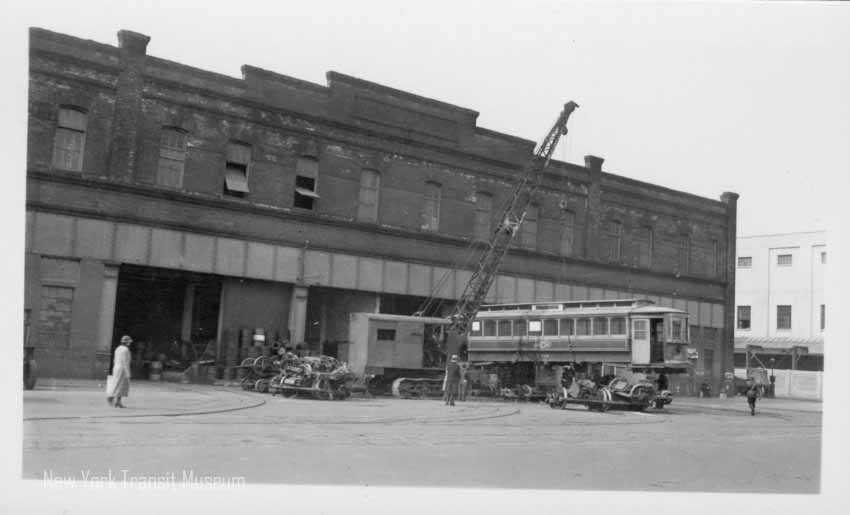
The former Lenox Avenue Car House, now the site of the Hale Depot.

The site of the Mother Clara Hale Depot, formerly named the 146th Street Depot until 1993, is located at 721 Lenox Avenue, filling the block bounded by Lenox Avenue, Seventh Avenue, and 146th and 147th Streets in Harlem, Manhattan (40.821949°N 73.93897°W), two blocks south of the Harlem–148th Street subway station. The three-floor structure has capacity for 150 buses. The depot is named for Harlem humanitarian Clara Hale.

The site of the depot was initially home to the Lenox Avenue Car House, a two-story car barn and power station, built by the Metropolitan Street Railway for their Lenox Avenue Line, the first line in the city to use conduit electrification. The line and depot began service on July 9, 1895. The New York City Omnibus Corporation, which had replaced the trolley lines with bus routes in 1936, began constructing a new bus garage on the site in 1938. Operations from the new depot began on July 31, 1939. It was rehabilitated in 1990. This depot had capacity for 123 buses. On September 23, 1993, it was renamed the Mother Clara Hale Depot.

The previous depot building closed in January 2008 and was demolished in spring 2009. To make up for the lack of storage space, the Amsterdam Depot reopened temporarily, with some routes shifted to Manhattanville and West Farms. The old depot was originally a part of the Bronx Division. A new garage was built on the site after demolition, designed as a "green depot" with solar panels and features for energy conservation and efficiency. The new depot was opened on November 20, 2014, at the cost of $262 million. The new depot, which can now house 150 buses, has replaced the 126th Street Depot, which lies above a historical 17th century African-American burial ground; it opened as a directly run NYCT depot in the Manhattan Division like the 126th Street Depot on January 4, 2015, though many routes are operated from other depots.

==== Fleet ====
- New Flyer XDE40
- New Flyer XD60
- Nova Bus LFSA

==== Routes ====
- Local Routes: M1, M7
- Articulated Local/SBS Routes: M15 SBS, M35, M125

=== Tuskegee Airmen Depot ===
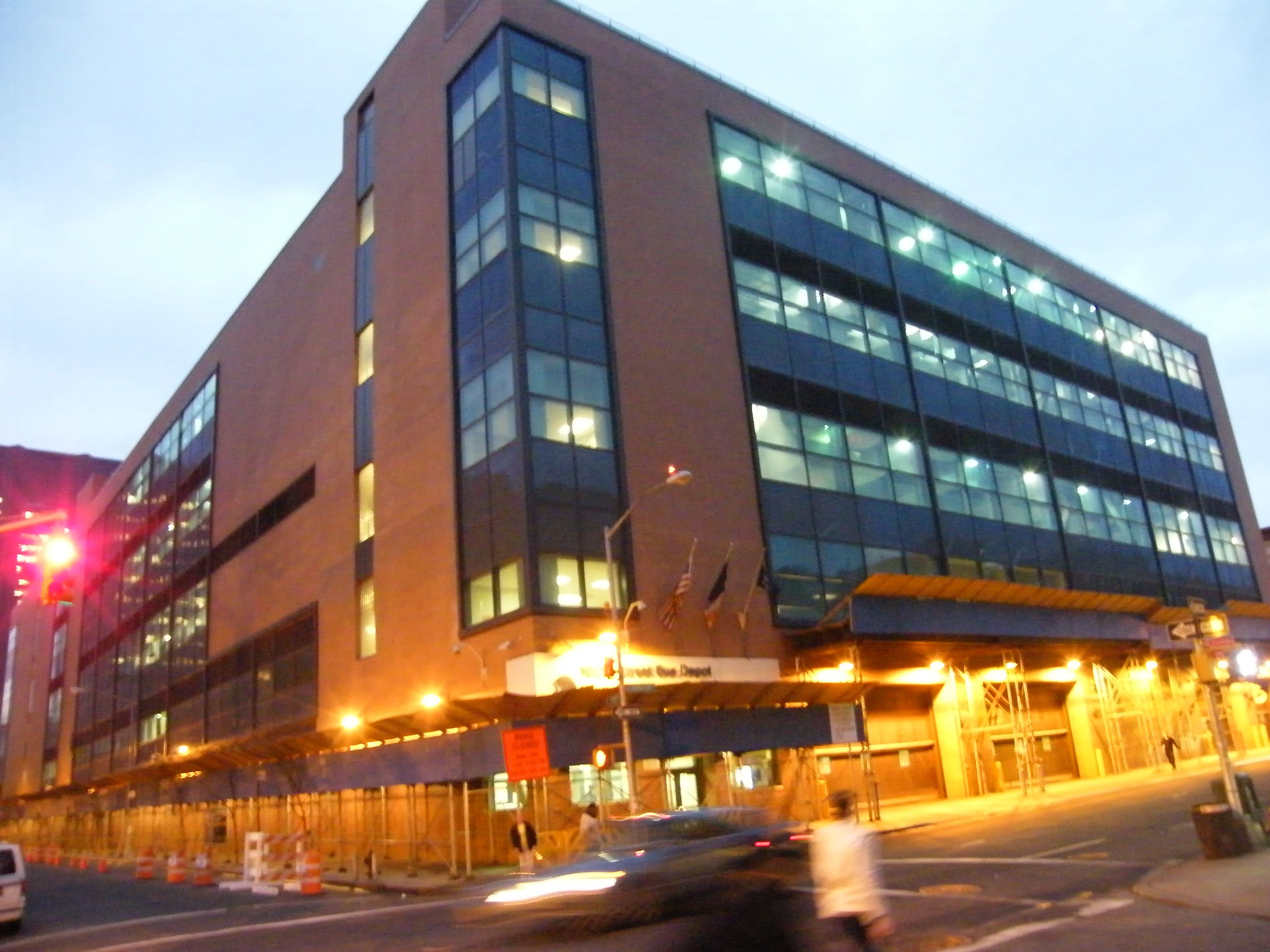
Tuskegee Airmen Depot

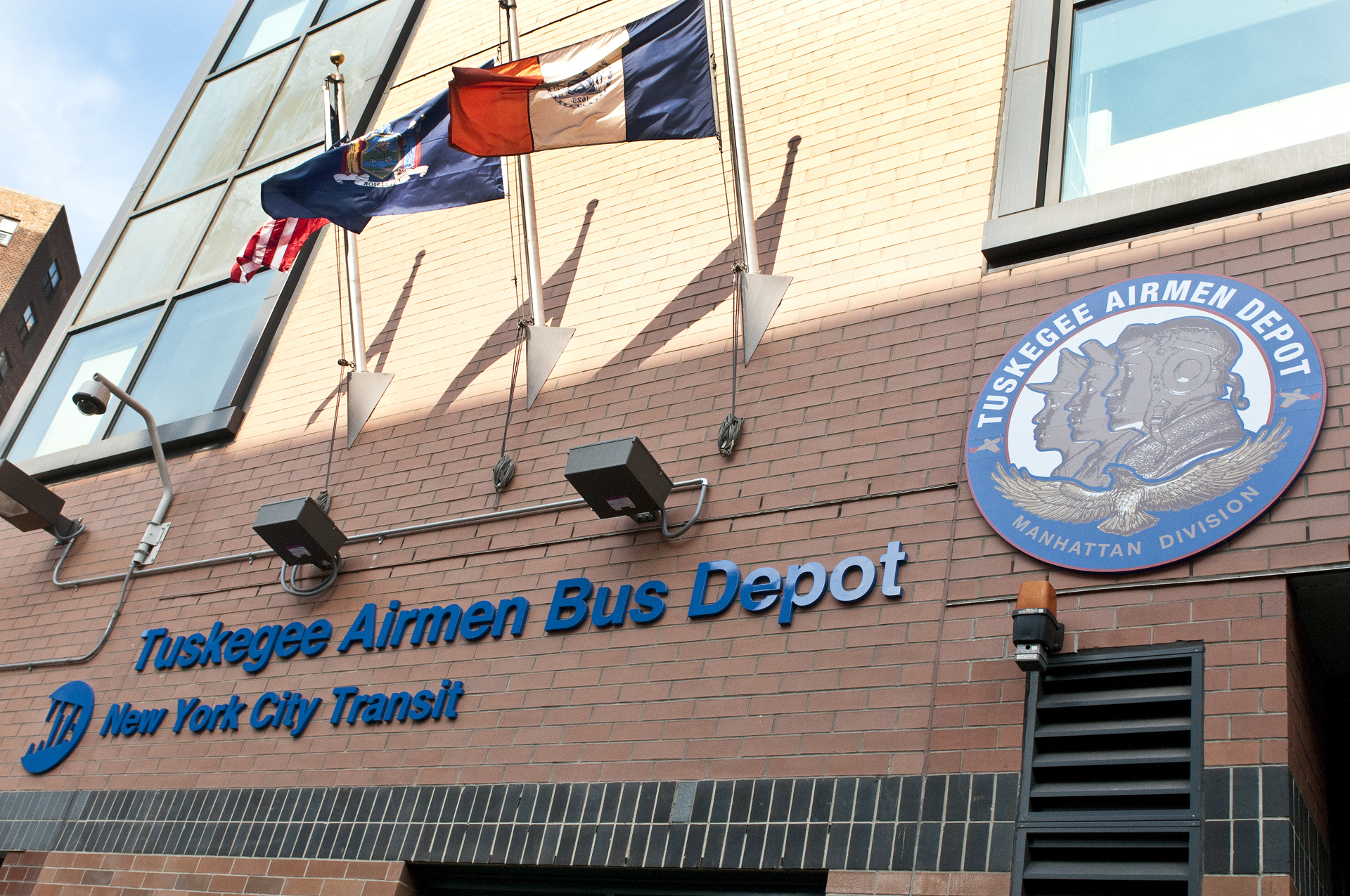
Tuskegee Airmen Depot logo

The Tuskegee Airmen Depot is located at 1552 Lexington Avenue, filling the block bounded by Park Avenue, Lexington Avenue, and 99th and 100th Streets in the East Harlem neighborhood of Manhattan (40.78842°N 73.950605°W), north of the 96th Street subway station, and near the 97th Street portal of the Park Avenue Tunnel. The depot had been a car barn for streetcars on the Lexington Avenue Line, built in 1895. The depot was closed in spring 1998 and was demolished, and reconstructed, while the Michael J. Quill Depot was opened to replace it. The depot reopened on September 7, 2003, taking on a number of routes from the Hudson Depot. It became the Tuskegee Airmen Depot on March 23, 2012, in honor of the famous World War II airmen. The facility has drawn the ire of many East Harlem residents; many residents cite high asthma rates in the area and the fact that the depot is in a residential area. As of May 2021, only the M31 runs with Hybrid-Electric buses.

==== Fleet ====
- Nova Bus LFS HEV 3G
- Nova Bus LFSA
- Nova Bus LFSA 2G
- New Flyer XD60

==== Routes ====
- Local Route: M31
- Articulated Local Routes: M15, M101, M102, M103

== Queens Division ==
MTA Regional Bus Operations operate various local and express routes under New York City Transit and MTA Bus Company, with three MTA Bus Company depots located in Queens (Baisley Park, College Point & LaGuardia) being members of Transport Workers Union Local 100, the Brooklyn-based Spring Creek Depot being a member of ATU 1181, and all NYCT depots plus Far Rockaway & JFK being members of ATU Local 1056 and Local 1179 of Queens, New York. All New York City Transit Queens Division supervisors are members of Transport Workers Union Local 106.

On June 29, 2025, former NYCT routes Q26, Q28 and Q32 became part of the MTA Bus Company, while former Triboro Coach routes Q29, Q38, Q39 and former Queens Surface Corporation route Q67 became part of NYCT. In addition, the Q58 officially joined the Queens Division while the Q38 was the only ex-MTA Bus route to stay in that division.

=== Baisley Park Depot (MTA Bus) ===
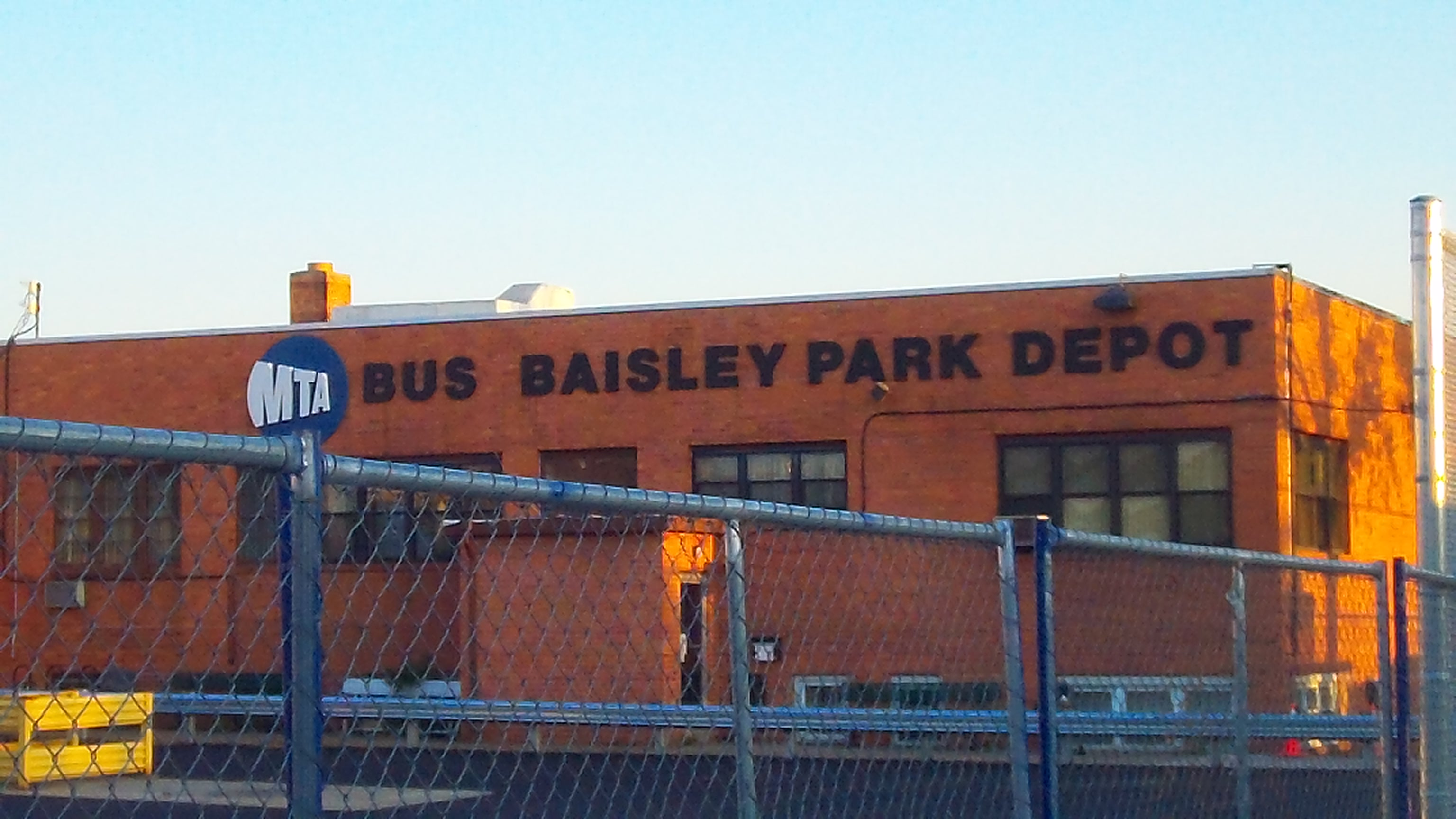
Baisley Park Bus Depot

The Baisley Park Depot is located at the southeast corner of Guy R. Brewer Boulevard and Linden Boulevard (114-15 Guy R. Brewer Boulevard) in South Jamaica, Queens (40.688187°N 73.785020°W), northeast of Baisley Pond Park. It is owned by GTJ Reit Inc. (Green, Triboro, Jamaica Realty Investment Trust), successor to the former operators and Command Bus Company, and leased to the City of New York, and operated by MTA Bus Company for a period of 21 years. The brick facility was opened in 1966 and was operated by Jamaica Buses; the company's original depot was located across the street (114-02 Guy R. Brewer Boulevard) before the land was acquired by New York State in 1958. On January 30, 2006, it was leased to the City of New York and MTA Bus. Later that year, a bus operator training center was opened at the facility. In 2016, the depot began receiving articulated buses, which are mainly used by the Guy R. Brewer Boulevard routes. During rush hours, some selected artics trips on or with the Q110.

==== Fleet ====
- Nova Bus LFS 4G
- New Flyer XD60
- Prevost X3-45 2G

==== Routes ====
- Standard Routes: Q51, Q110, Q112
- Articulated Routes: Q111, Q113, Q114, Q115
- Express Route: QM21

=== Casey Stengel Depot ===
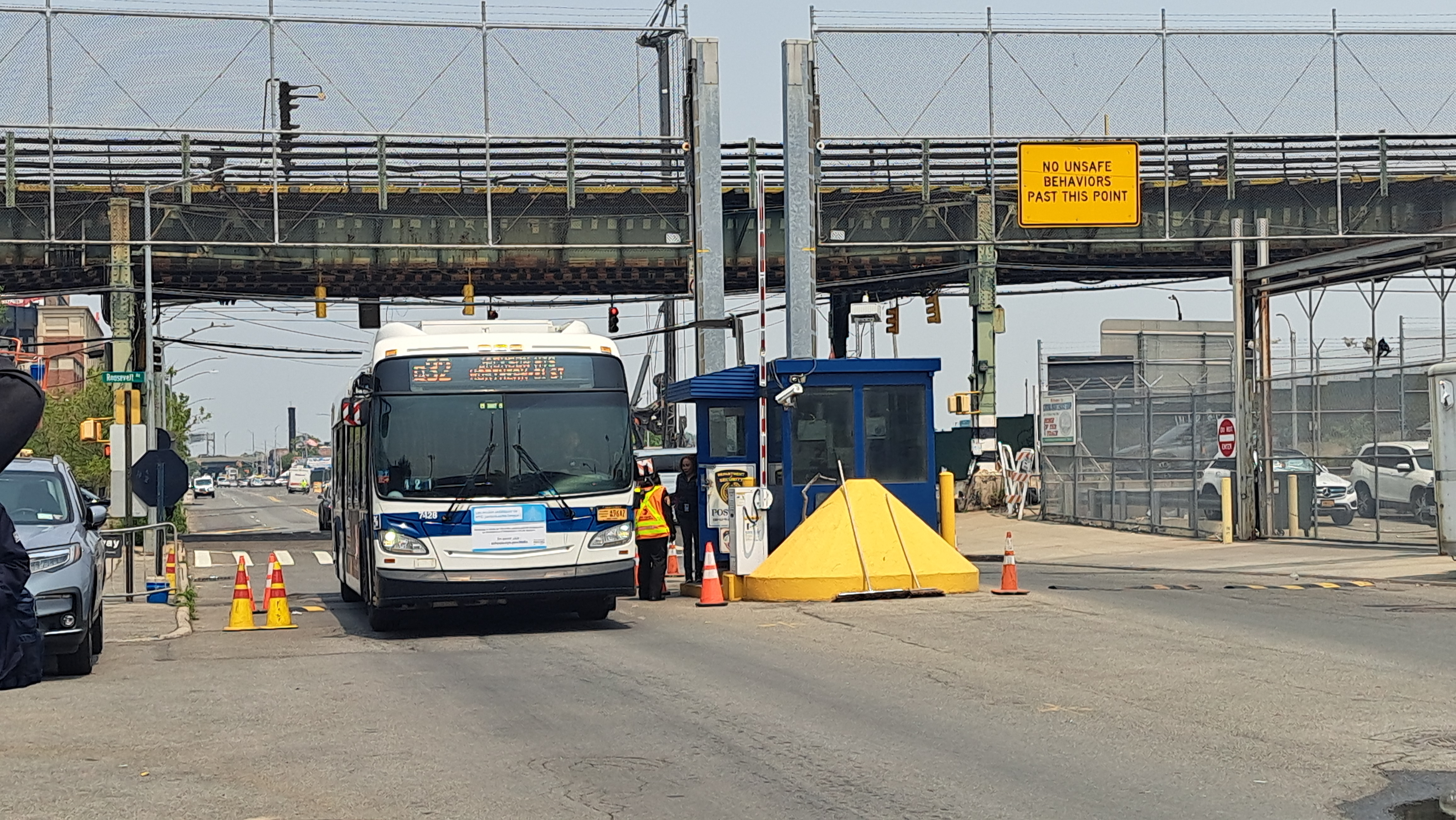
A 2015 New Flyer XD40 (7428) enters Casey Stengel Depot after a Q32 run to Jackson Heights

The Casey Stengel Depot, formerly the Flushing Depot, is located on the south side of Roosevelt Avenue in Flushing Meadows–Corona Park in Corona, Queens (40.754922°N 73.841925°W), west of 126th Street and east of the New York City Subway's Corona Yard. The depot is named after Casey Stengel, former manager of the New York Yankees and New York Mets, and is across the street from Citi Field, where the Mets play. The original Flushing Depot was inherited from the defunct North Shore Bus Company in 1947. The depot was rebuilt by the city in the late 1940s, re-opening in 1950. This depot suffered from structural problems due to poor soil conditions. In the early 1980s, the NYCTA decided to rebuild the depot, and in 1986 a $2.2 million contract was awarded to Howard, Needles, Tamamen and Bergendoff to design the new depot, which they finished in June 1987. They developed plans for a maintenance building and a transportation building to allow buses to continue using the depot while construction was going on. The $1.3 million contract for the foundation work for the two buildings was awarded to the Pile Foundation Construction Company in April 1987, and the contract $53.5 million contract for the depot's construction was awarded to Carlin-Atlas Joint Venture in June 1997. This depot was rebuilt again in the 1990s, opening on August 16, 1992. At this time, it was renamed the Casey Stengel Depot. The depot's rebuilding cost $55 million and it consists of 71,000 square feet (6,600 m^{2}) with 11 bus lifts. This depot has also been modified to accommodate articulated buses, with the Q44 converted as of June 2012 and the Q12 in September 2019.

An Orion VII NG (4363) operating on the Q76 towards College Point.

==== Fleet ====
- OBI Orion VII NG HEV
- Nova Bus LFS 4G
- New Flyer XD40
- New Flyer XD60

==== Routes ====
- Standard Routes: Q13, Q15, Q16, Q20, Q31, Q38, Q58, Q61, Q76, Q90, Q98
- Articulated Routes: Q12, Q44 SBS

A 2012 New Flyer C40LF (613) making its way towards Flushing on the Q28

=== College Point Depot (MTA Bus; CNG) ===
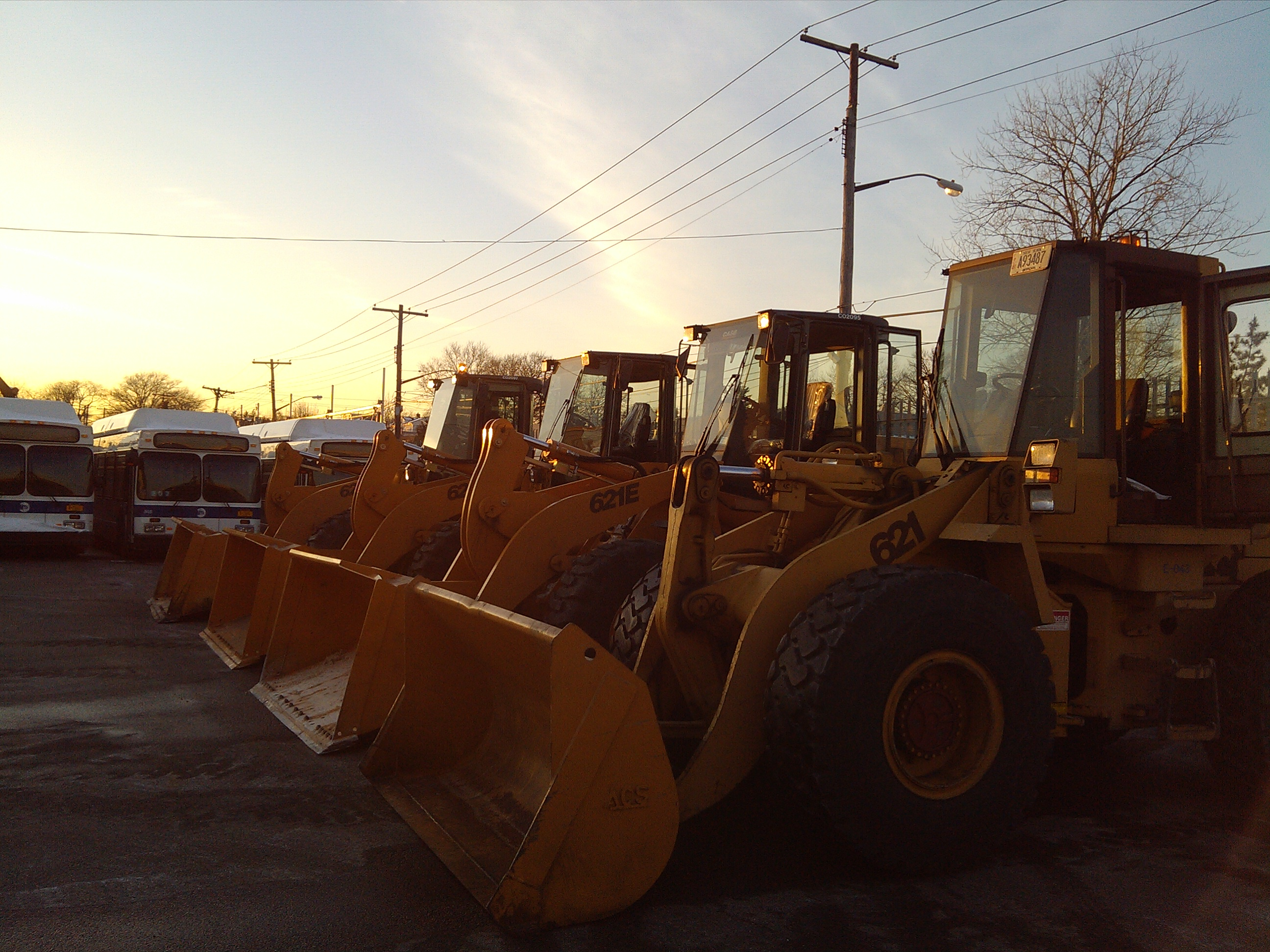
Pay loaders and New Flyer C40LF CNG buses at the College Point Depot

The College Point Depot is located on 28th Avenue near Ulmer Street in the College Point section of Queens (40.773378°N 73.840804°W), near the printing plant of The New York Times, the former site of Flushing Airport, and directly behind the headquarters of Queens Surface on land owned by New York City. The depot stores around 250 buses. Construction on the $43 million project began in 1993. The depot was supposed to be completed by spring 1996, but was delayed to October 1997 because the general contractor for the project quit the job. As of June 1996, the project was 60% completed. In August 1996, the electrical contractor stopped work on the project due to a contract dispute with the NYCDOT. The depot opened on October 31, 1997, a year ahead of a previous estimate. The depot increased the number of its wash bays from 1 to 3, and doubled the company's repair bays to 24. It was built with space for 275 buses and 400 cars. This was the first CNG fueling station to be built by and owned by the city. It is owned by the New York City Department of Transportation and leased to MTA Bus. It had been leased to Queens Surface Corporation before the lease was taken over by MTA Bus. Many buses under Queens Surface used compressed natural gas, and all local bus service from this depot operates using CNG provided by Trillium CNG. In 2006, a unified command center for MTA Bus Company was established at the depot.

==== Fleet ====
- New Flyer C40LF
- MCI D4500CL
- MCI D4500CT
- Prevost X3-45 2G

==== Routes ====
- Standard Routes: Q25, Q26, Q28, Q63, Q64, Q65, Q66, Q74. The Q25, Q64, Q65, and Q66 were formerly Queens Surface routes.
- Express Routes: QM1, QM2, QM4, QM5, QM6, QM7, QM8, QM10, QM11, QM12, QM20, QM31, QM32, QM35, QM36, QM40, QM42, QM44, BxM9 (P.M. rush only, shared with Eastchester)

=== Far Rockaway/John F. Kennedy Depots (MTA Bus) ===
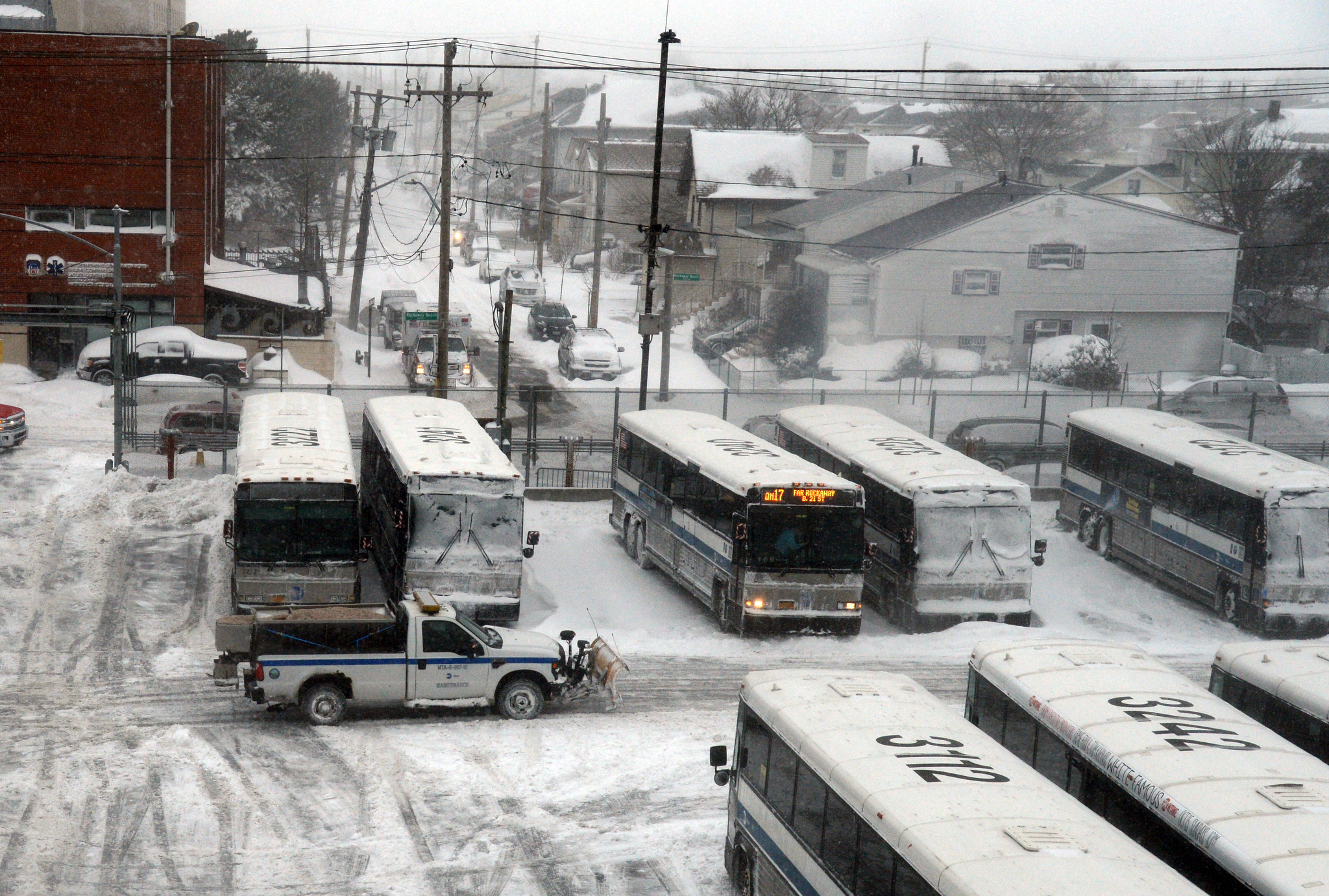
A 2006 Motor Coach D4500CL (3240) at Far Rockaway Depot after completing QM17 trip to Far Rockaway, along with 3222, 3228, 3241 & 3242, 2005 units 3112 & 3172, and one more unit, covered in snow in January 2018

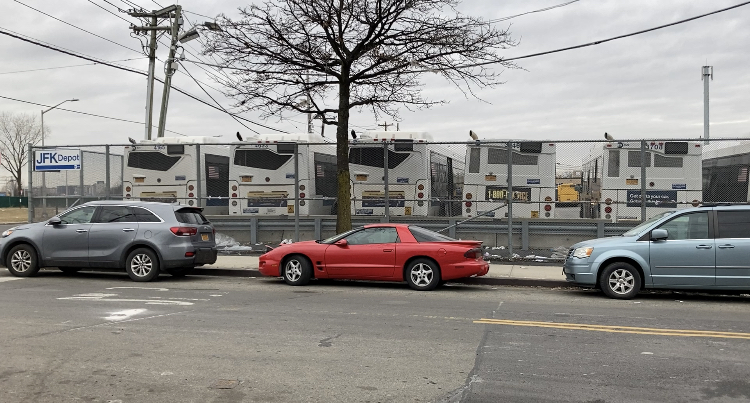
A 2009 Orion VII NG HEV (4160) and a 2007 Orion VII OG HEV (3706) at JFK Depot, plus one more OG, three more NGs, and an XD60, as seen from 147th Avenue in 2022

The Far Rockaway Depot and the John F. Kennedy Depot (or JFK Depot) are garages that were operated by Green Bus Lines until January 9, 2006, when MTA Bus took over and started operating the old company's bus routes. Both depots are now owned by GTJ Reit Inc (the successor to Green Lines), except for the newly built annex building at Far Rockaway which is owned by the MTA-NYCTA, and had been used by Green Bus Lines Inc. before being leased to the City of New York and operated by MTA Bus for a period of 21 years.

The Far Rockaway Depot is situated on Rockaway Beach Boulevard and Beach 49th Street (49-19 Rockaway Beach Boulevard) in Arverne / Edgemere, Queens on the Rockaway Peninsula (40.592950°N 73.779614°W). The depot has two storage lots and a small maintenance facility. Following damage from Hurricane Sandy, the facility was closed between October 2012 and February 2013, with its fleet housed at Building 78 on the grounds of John F. Kennedy International Airport two blocks away from the JFK Depot. In 2014, the MTA opened a new annex building with a modern and updated maintenance facility, to expand this facility in order to maintain and support more buses. The project to fully restore the depot was scheduled to begin in 2015, but has yet to begin as of 2016. It has also been proposed to partially power the facility using wind turbines.

The JFK Depot is located in Springfield Gardens at 147th Avenue and Rockaway Boulevard (165-25 147th Avenue) near JFK Airport (40.661348°N 73.773916°W). It was the primary storage and maintenance facility for Green Bus Lines prior to MTA Bus takeover. The depot was built from 1951 to 1952 at the cost of $500,000. It was also modified to accommodate articulated buses, with the Q10 converted as of May 2013. At this time the Q52 also ran artics occasionally, until permanent conversion in October 2017.

==== Fleet ====
All local buses are assigned to JFK and loaned to Far Rockaway, unless specified below. All express buses are assigned to Far Rockaway and loaned to JFK.

- Nova Bus LFS 4G
- New Flyer XD40
- New Flyer XD60 (JFK only)
- Prevost X3-45 2G

==== Routes ====
All routes used to be part of Green Bus Lines, except the Q52 and QM65:

- Far Rockaway Standard Routes: Q11, Q22, Q35, Q41
- JFK Standard Routes: Q6, Q7, Q8, Q9, Q37, Q40, Q60
- JFK Articulated Routes: Q10, Q52 SBS, Q80
- Far Rockaway Express Routes: QM15, QM16, QM17, QM18
- JFK Express Route: QM65

=== Jamaica Depot ===
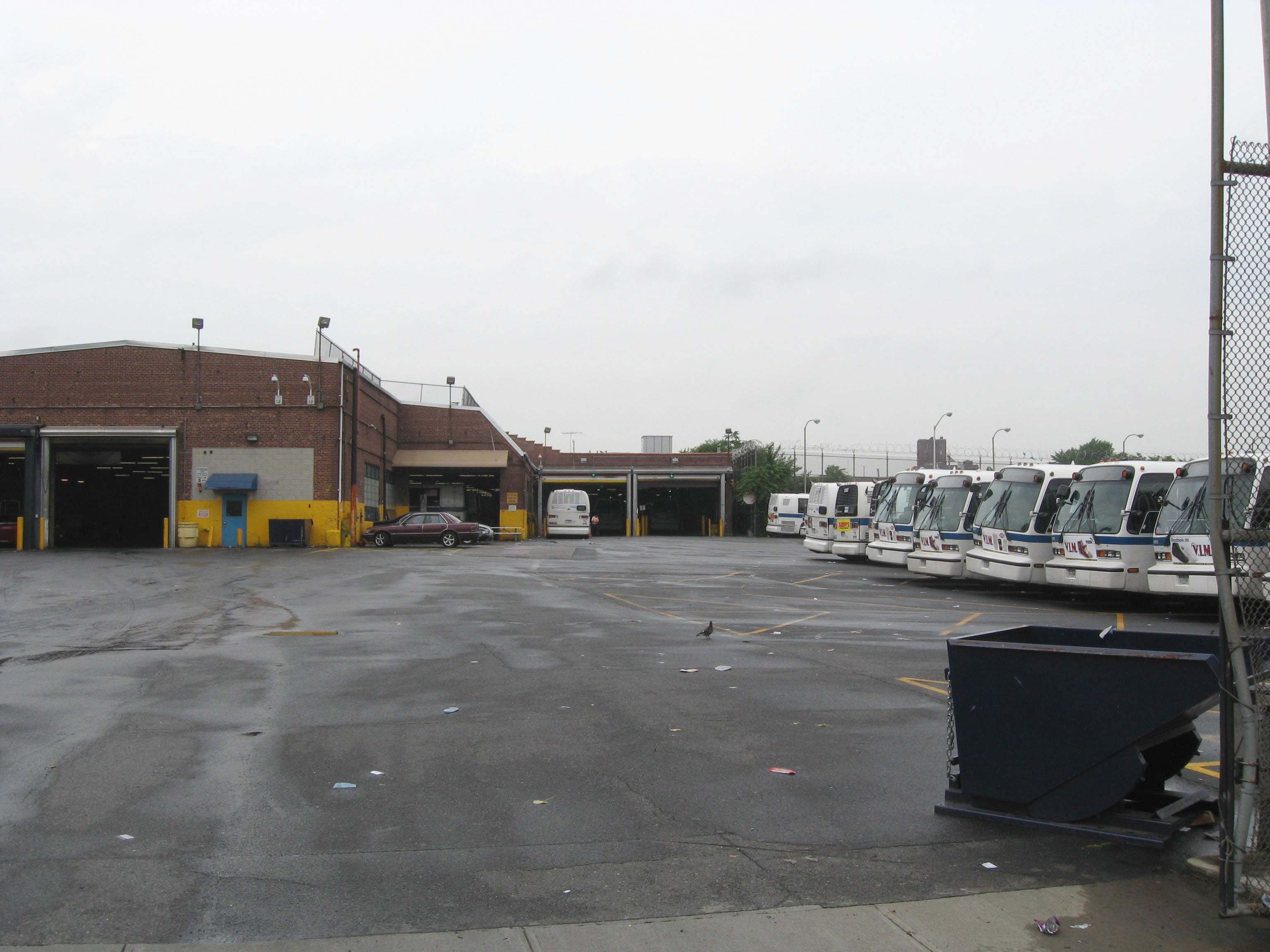
10 RTS buses at Jamaica Depot, including 1998 Nova Bus RTS-06 unit 4912 at the furthest right

The Jamaica Depot is located on the west side of Merrick Boulevard just south of Liberty Avenue in Jamaica, Queens (40.700689°N 73.790663°W). The depot lies between Merrick Boulevard to the east and 165th Street to the west, and spans about three blocks north-to-south between Tuskegee Airmen Way (South Road) and 107th Avenue, located across from the campus of York College. The depot was opened by the North Shore Bus Company in August 1940 and inherited by the Board of Transportation in 1947. An addition was constructed in 1950, adding additional storage and a bus washing area. The depot was expanded again in 1968, and from 1993 to 1994.

The 58,000 square foot depot is the oldest existing New York City Transit Depot. (Note: The Jamaica Depot is the oldest continuously-operating depot under New York City Bus. Several depots are older, but have been rebuilt, with the original structure demolished.) It holds 150 buses at capacity, but is assigned 208 buses, many of which are parked on the surrounding streets. Due to its age and capacity issues and to accommodate articulated buses, the MTA plans to demolish the existing structure and build a new and expanded depot on the same site, as well as on 50,000 square feet of adjacent property purchased in April 2014. At this time, construction was anticipated to begin in 2018, with all of its buses, and local routes temporarily sent to other depots. In December 2021, the MTA announced a redevelopment project for the Jamaica Depot, to be completed by 2026. As part of the project, the depot would be modified to support up to 60 electric-powered buses. The MTA has finished construction of a temporary lot at the York College property on the corner of 165th Street and Tuskegee Airmen Way. It can hold up to 168 buses still under capacity.

==== Fleet ====
- Nova Bus LFS 3G
- Nova Bus LFS 4G
- New Flyer XD40

==== Routes ====
- Standard Routes: Q3, Q4, Q5, Q17, Q30, Q42, Q77, Q84, Q85, Q86, Q87, Q89

=== LaGuardia Depot (MTA Bus) ===
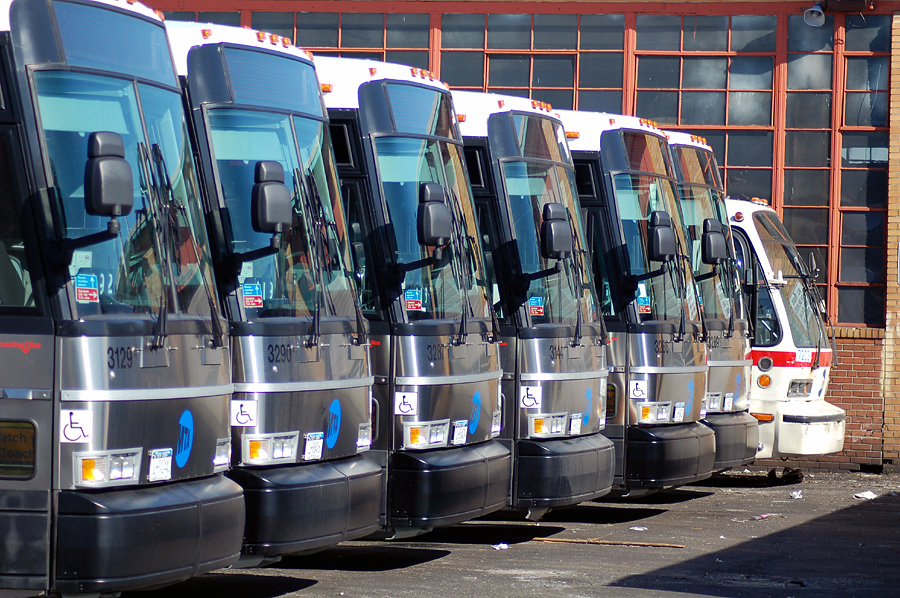
Motor Coach D4500CLs at the LaGuardia Depot: 2005 units 3129 & 3144, and 2006 units 3286, 3287, 3289 & 3290, plus a former Triboro Coach RTS bus (far right).

LaGuardia Depot is located on a two-block long structure (85-01 24th Avenue) bound by 85th and 87th Street, and 23rd and 24th Avenues in the East Elmhurst & Jackson Heights neighborhoods near LaGuardia Airport (40.766176°N 73.883474°W). The depot was opened on January 15, 1954, is owned by GTJ Reit Inc, and was operated by Triboro Coach Corporation before being leased to the City of New York and operated by MTA Bus Company on February 20, 2006, for a period of 21 years. In 1989, a methanol fuel station was installed at the facility for six General Motors-built RTS methanol buses. It was later used in the early 1990s to fuel an NYCT demonstration bus from the Casey Stengel Depot and three new Triboro-operated RTS buses fitted with special Detroit Diesel Series 92 engines. Beginning in 1994, the facility dispatched compressed natural gas (CNG) buses in addition to its diesel fleet. The depot was decommissioned from CNG operations in 2006 due to not meeting the MTA's safety and environmental standards. On April 10, 2006, while workers from KeySpan were removing CNG from tanks and a private contractor was conducting construction near the depot, a gas compressor station exploded leading to a large fire at the depot. One bus was destroyed and 12 were damaged. Work to modify this depot to accommodate articulated buses was completed in the 2010s, with the Q53 converted in October 2017 and the Q70 in June 2020.

==== Fleet ====
- Nova Bus LFS 4G
- New Flyer XD40
- New Flyer XD60
- Prevost X3-45 2G

==== Routes ====
Many of these routes used to be part of Triboro Coach. Several had been Queens Surface Corporation routes that operate in western Queens, which were closer to the LaGuardia Depot than their former Queens Surface Depot in College Point.

- Standard Routes: Q18, Q19, Q23, Q32, Q33, Q47, Q49, Q69, Q72, Q100, Q101, Q102, Q103, Q104
- Articulated Routes: Q53 SBS, Q70 SBS
- Express Routes: QM24, QM25, QM34

=== Queens Village Depot ===
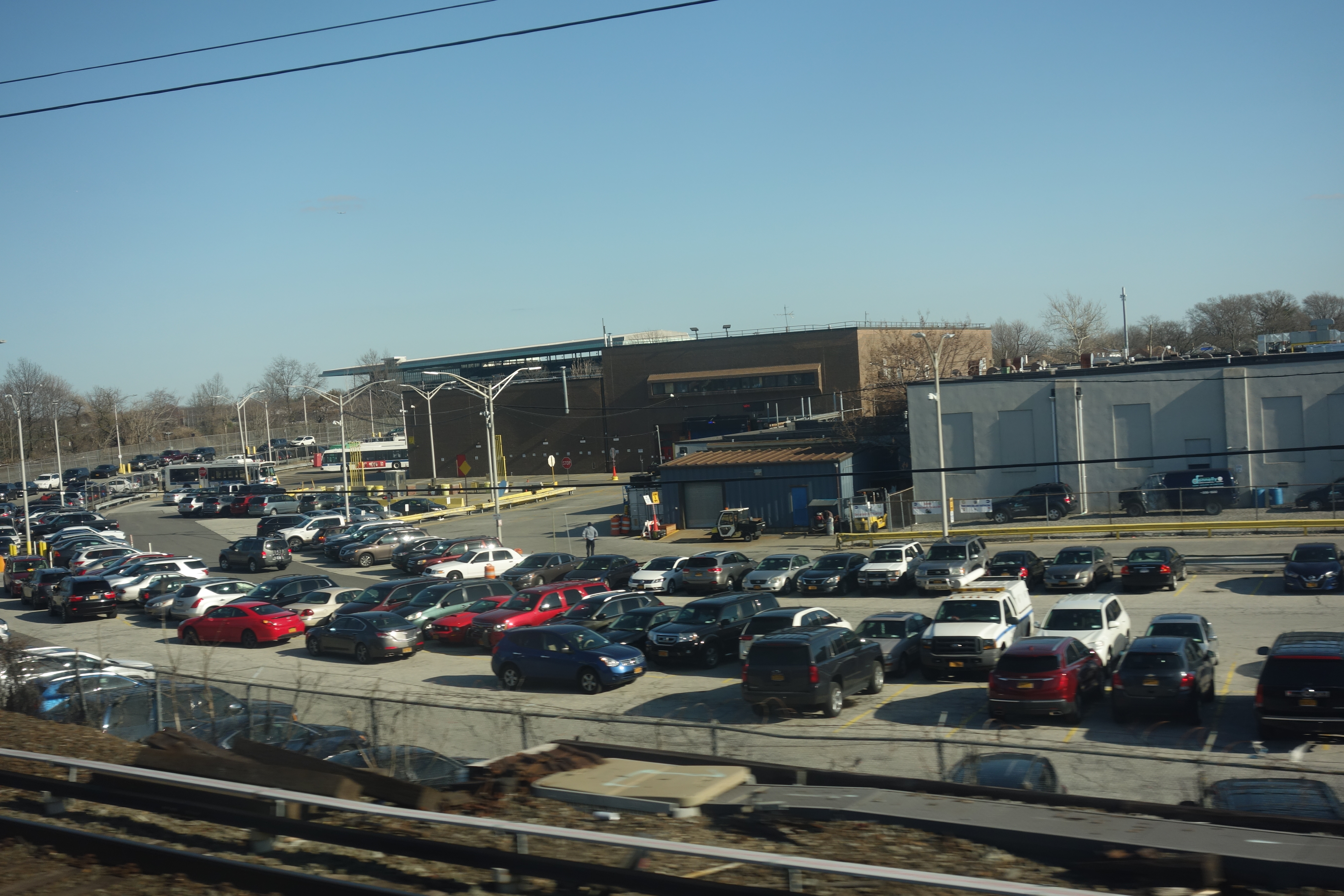
An Orion VII OG HEV and a 2011 Nova Bus LFS at Queens Village Depot, looking from a passing LIRR train.

The Queens Village Depot is located on 97-11 222nd Street between 97th and 99th Avenues in Queens Village (40.717232°N 73.730045°W), across to the west from Belmont Park. The MTA began acquiring land for the depot in 1968. The depot was opened on September 8, 1974, and it is on the site of what was Dugan's Bakery. Upon opening, the depot received many former North Shore Bus Company routes from the existing Casey Stengel and Jamaica Depots, and relieved overcrowding at those depots. In 1979, the buses from the depot tested a radio-based real-time information system called the "Radio-Data-Locator System", precursor to MTA Bus Time. The depot was renovated in 1987, stores around 250 buses, and has 202,178 square feet (18,783.0 m^{2}) of space. The Queens Village Depot building won an Award Honor for engineering excellence from the New York Association of Consulting Engineers.

==== Fleet ====
- Nova Bus LFS 3G
- Nova Bus LFS 4G
- MCI D4500CT
- Prevost X3-45

==== Routes ====
- Standard Routes: Q1, Q2, Q27, Q36, Q43, Q45, Q46, Q48, Q75, Q82, Q83, Q88
- School Tripper: Q31 (shared with Casey Stengel)
- Express Routes: QM63, QM64, QM68

=== Spring Creek Depot (MTA Bus; CNG) ===
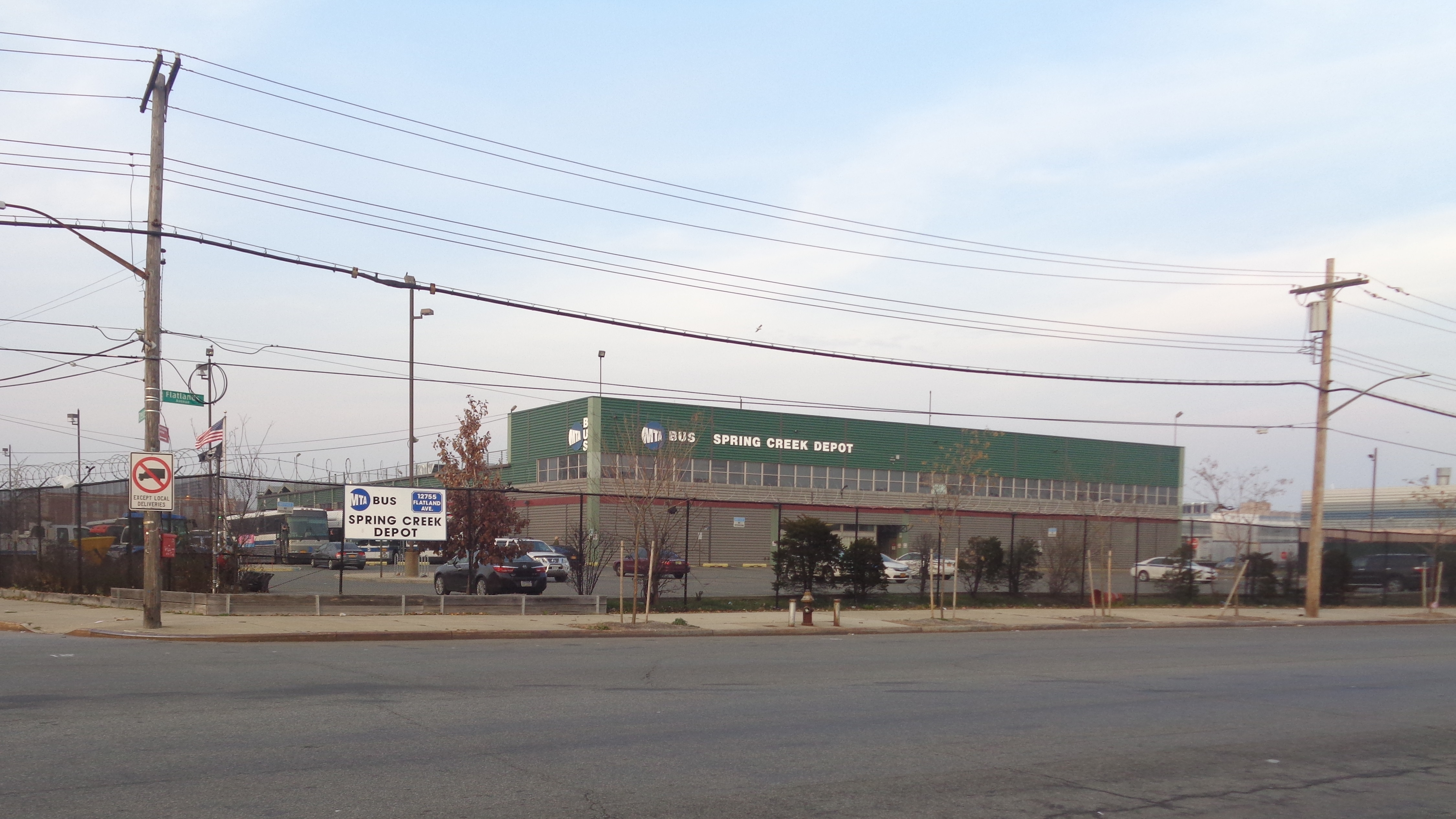
The Spring Creek Depot seen from Flatlands Avenue

The Spring Creek Depot is located on Flatlands Avenue east of Crescent Street in Brooklyn's East New York neighborhood (40.661628°N 73.865156°W), adjacent to the Brooklyn General Mail Facility, and several blocks northeast of the Gateway Center. Despite the location, the depot is part of the Queens Division. It was built by and owned by the New York City Department of Transportation in 1996, and leased to the Command Bus Company. It was sold to MTA Bus in early 2009. Command's previous depot was several blocks to the northwest on Montauk Avenue and Wortman Avenue (612/626 Wortman Avenue), which now houses the school bus operations of the successor company Varsity Bus Company.

In 1988, two Orion I Command buses were fitted by the Brooklyn Union Gas Company with engines that operated on compressed natural gas (CNG). A compressor station was installed at the Wortman Avenue depot. By the mid-1990s, many of the buses operated by Command ran on CNG. Local buses out of this depot continue to operate on compressed natural gas under the MTA.

==== Fleet ====
- New Flyer C40LF
- MCI D4500CL
- MCI D4500CT
- Prevost X3-45 2G

==== Routes ====
Spring Creek is the only bus depot to not operate any routes with the matching borough of its division.

- Local Routes: B100, B103
- Express Routes: BM1, BM2, BM3, BM4, BM5

== Staten Island Division ==
All Staten Island division bus depots are the members of Amalgamated Transit Union Local 726 of Staten Island, New York and are all operated by New York City Transit.

=== Castleton Depot ===
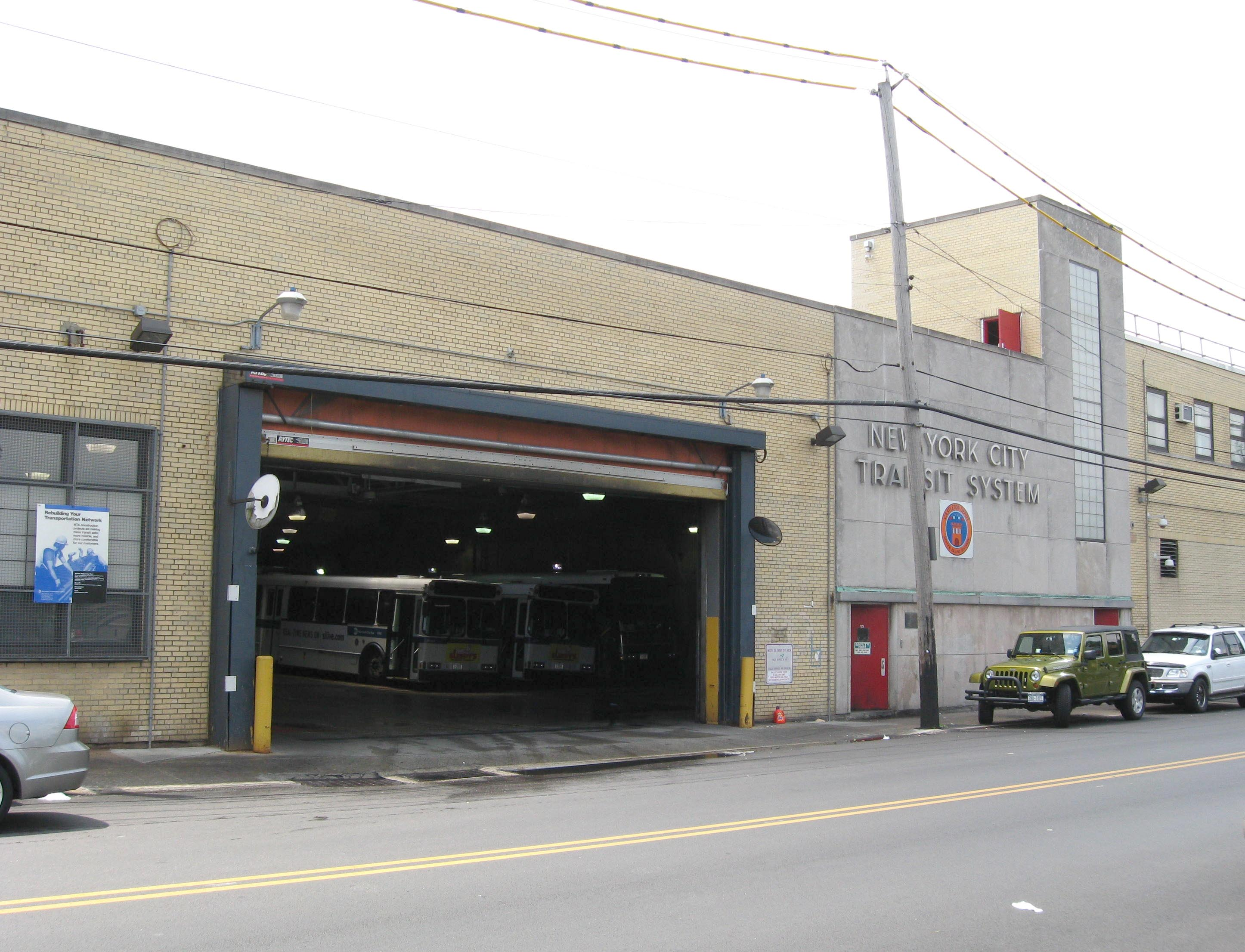
A 1999 Orion V (6142), plus one more Orion V and a Motor Coach D4500CL at Castleton Depot, looking from Castleton Avenue

Castleton Depot, also called Castleton Avenue Depot, is located on 1390 Castleton Avenue and fills the block bounded by Jewett Avenue, Hurst Street, Castleton Avenue, and Rector Street in Port Richmond (40.633464°N 74.128929°W). A large parking lot on the east side of Rector Street is also used for bus storage. The depot was constructed in the late 1940s to provide urgently needed storage space for city-owned buses on Staten Island. When Isle Transportation went bankrupt in 1947, the city's Board of Transportation (predecessor of NYC Transit) took control of the majority of Staten Island bus operations. It was built to hold 135 buses, and can now store about 340 buses.

Following the closure of the Brook Street Depot, Isle Transportation's original facility, in 1958, Castleton Depot was the only city-owned depot on Staten Island and was known as Staten Island Depot. The next permanent depot to open in the borough was Yukon Depot, opened in 1981.

==== Fleet ====
- OBI Orion VII EPA10
- Nova Bus LFS 4G
- Prevost X3-45
- Prevost X3-45 2G

==== Routes ====
- Local Routes: S40, S42, S46, S48, S51, S52, S53, S54, S66, S76, S81, S86, S90, S93, S96, S98
- School Trippers: S59 (shared with Yukon), S55, S56 (A.M. only, shared with Charleston), S74, S78 (shared with both; plus one P.M. S74 trip out of this depot)
- Express Routes: SIM3, SIM3C, SIM30, SIM32, SIM33, SIM33C, SIM34, SIM35, SIM7 & SIM9 (shared with Yukon)
- Supplement Express Route: SIM1C (shared with Charleston, Yukon)

=== Charleston Depot ===
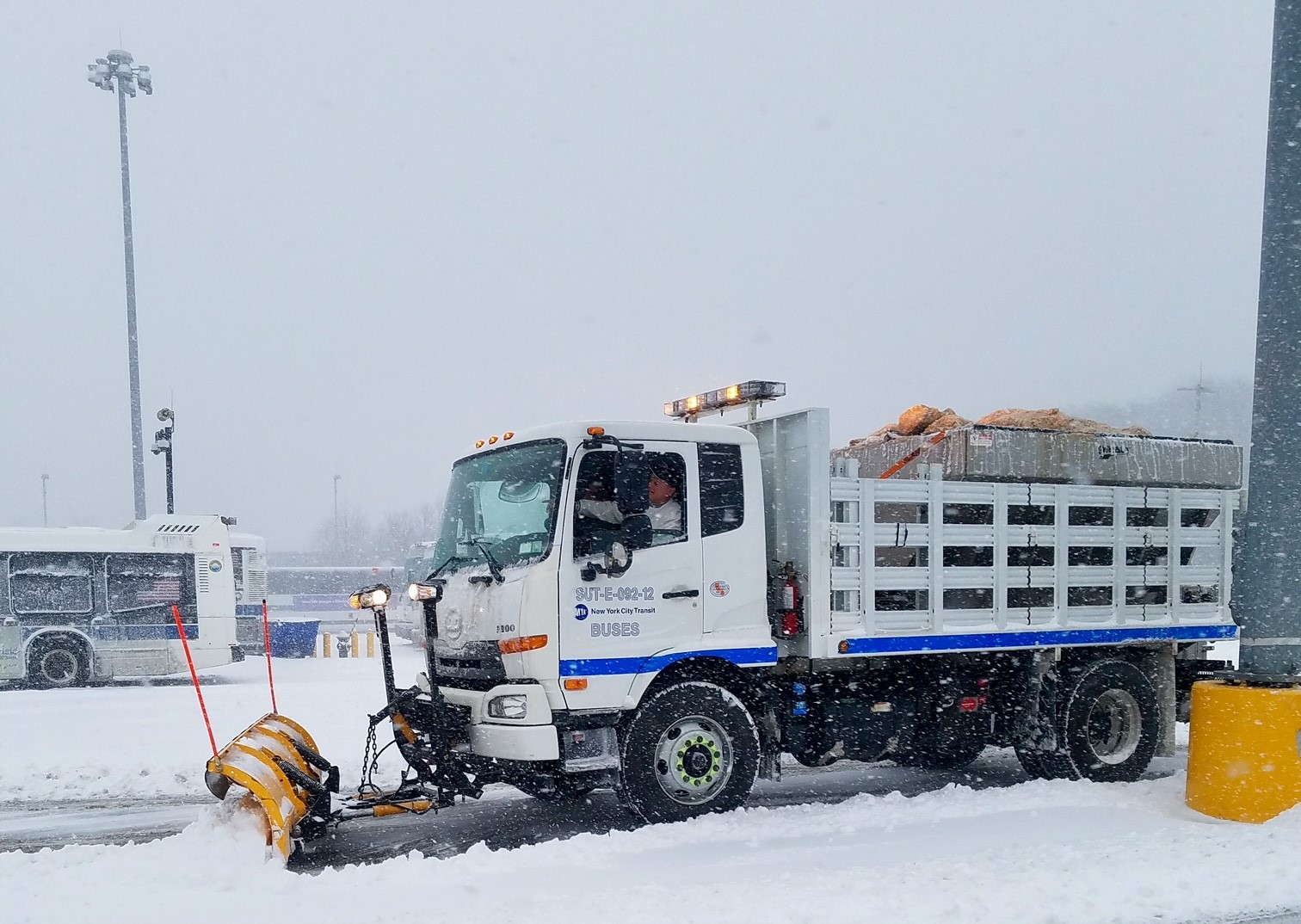
An MTA snowplow preparing for a storm at Charleston Depot, with a 2015-16 LFS, a Prevost, and three D4500CLs in the background

The Charleston Depot is located at 4700 Arthur Kill Road near the Outerbridge Crossing in Charleston (40.531447°N 74.238263°W). The facility includes a 87,000-square-foot (8,100 m^{2}) two-story building, with enough room to service and maintain 220 buses, but also includes outdoor parking for buses and employees. The site was selected in 2000. The depot was announced in September 2005 as part of the MTA's 2000-2004 Capital Plan, to relieve the overcrowding and maintenance and storage pressure's between the Castleton and Yukon bus depots, both of which had limited bus storage space. The depot was also intended to help expand express bus service in Staten Island, and improve service for then-36,000 Staten Islanders who used express buses. A new depot had been planned for around 30 years, and attempts to secure funding lasted around a decade. After delays due to lack of funding, construction on the depot (then called the Charleston Bus Annex) began on February 15, 2008. The depot opened on December 6, 2010.

==== Fleet ====
- Nova Bus LFS 4G
- Prevost X3-45
- Prevost X3-45 2G

==== Routes ====
- Local Routes: S55, S56, S74, S78, S84
- Express Routes: SIM2, SIM4, SIM4C, SIM8, SIM23, SIM24, SIM25, SIM26, SIM31
- Supplement Express Routes: SIM1, SIM5, SIM6, SIM10 (shared with Yukon), SIM1C, SIM7 (shared with Castleton, Yukon)

=== Yukon Depot ===
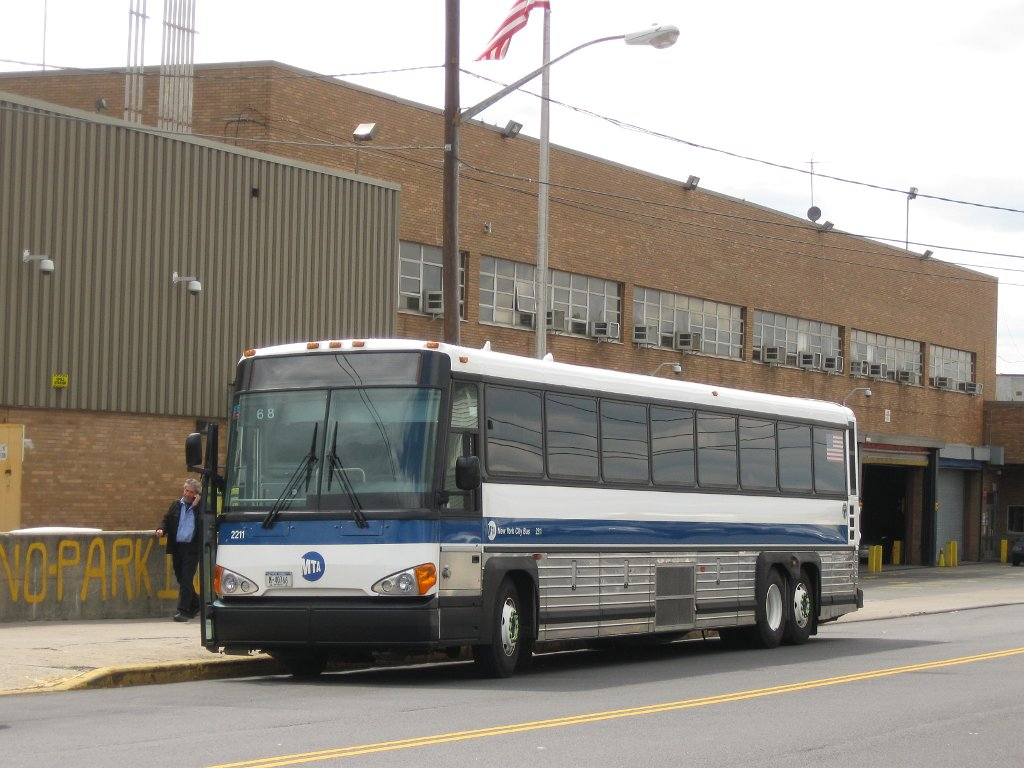
A 2008 Motor Coach D4500CT (2211) sitting outside Yukon Depot

The Yukon Depot is located on 40 Yukon Avenue between Richmond Avenue and Forest Hill Road in New Springville in the center of Staten Island, adjacent to the Staten Island Mall near Freshkills Park (40.573944°N 74.165810°W). Ground broke on the depot on January 23, 1978. The depot opened on September 13, 1981, relieving overcrowding at the Castleton Depot, and replacing the Edgewater Depot. It was built to store 250 buses, and can now store around 400.

==== Fleet ====
- Nova Bus LFS 4G
- Prevost X3-45
- Prevost X3-45 2G

==== Routes ====
- Local/SBS Routes: S44, S57, S59, S61, S62, S79 SBS, S89, S91, S92, S94
- School Trippers: S55, S56 (shared with Charleston, Castleton A.M. only), S74, S78 (shared with both)
- Express Routes: SIM1, SIM1C, SIM5, SIM6, SIM10, SIM11, SIM15, SIM22, SIM7 & SIM9 (shared with Castleton)

== Former depots ==
Below are the depots formerly used by the MTA and its predecessors for municipal bus operations, excluding facilities inherited by the city but not used for city-operated buses. Many of the depots were demolished or abandoned following their closure. Some have been converted for other uses by the MTA or other organizations. One depot, the 54th Street Depot, was demolished to make room for a new MTA facility outside of bus operations.

=== West 5th Street Depot ===
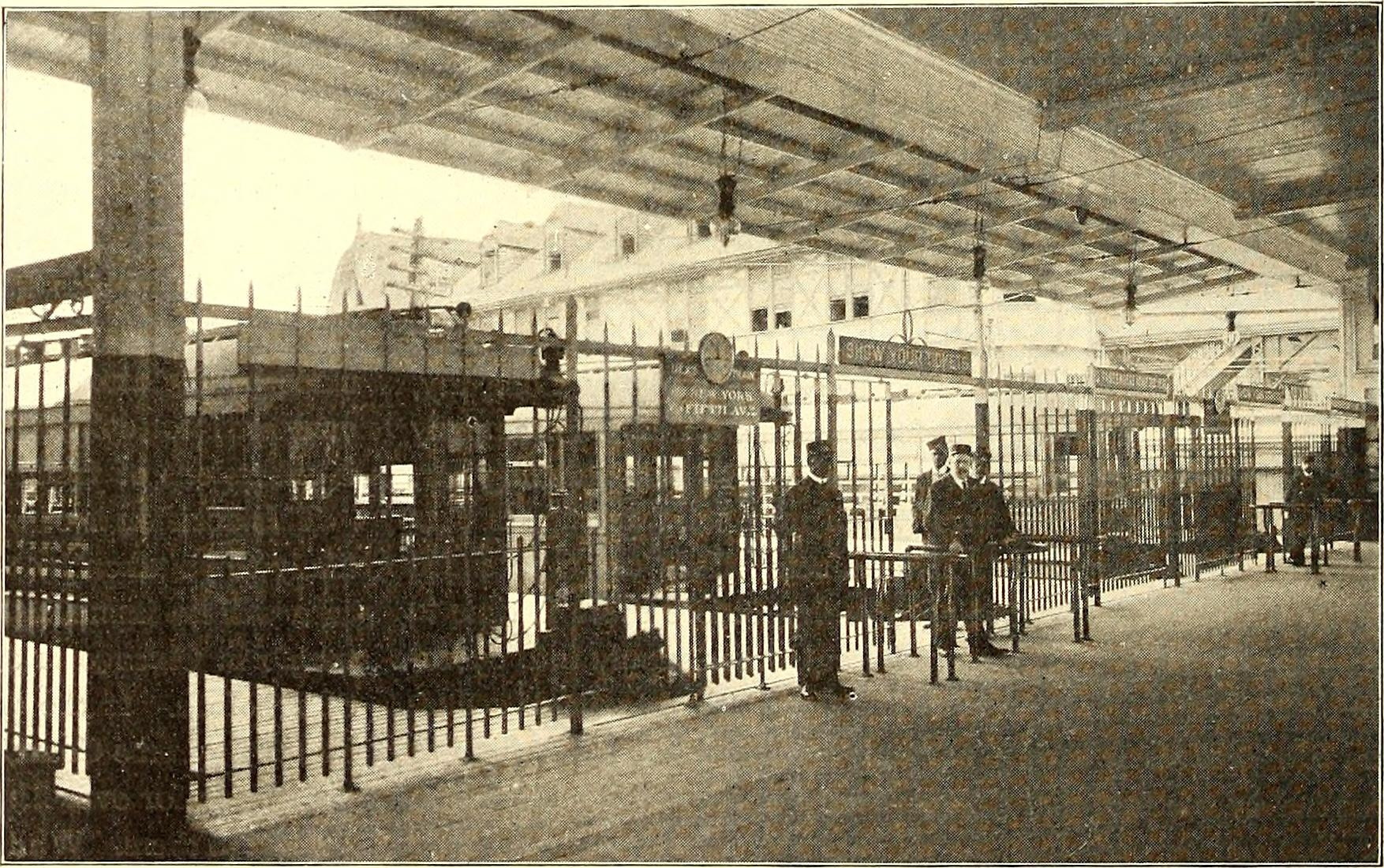
Site of the West Fifth Street Depot from 1904 when it was the Culver Depot

The West 5th Street Depot was located at the northwest corner of West 5th Street and Surf Avenue in Coney Island, Brooklyn (40.575235°N 73.973338°W), adjacent to the Brighton Beach neighborhood, and across from the current New York Aquarium, as well as near the former Luna Park amusement park. It was originally the site of a railroad and trolley terminal called the Culver Depot, built by the Prospect Park and Coney Island Railroad, operators of the Culver surface line along present-day McDonald Avenue in 1875. This depot was built on Surf Avenue between West 5th Street and West 8th Street, serving surface railroad and later Brighton and Culver elevated trains, as well as streetcars. The terminal also served the streetcar lines of the competing Coney Island and Brooklyn Railroad, including its Smith Street Line. A second adjacent facility on West 5th Street, also known as the Smith Street Trolley Depot, was built by the Coney Island and Brooklyn Railroad in 1912 exclusively for streetcars. Both streetcar companies as well as the Culver and Brighton lines would become part of the BRT by middle of the decade. By 1920, all elevated trains were moved west to the BRT's West End Depot, and the original Culver terminal was razed in 1923, with all streetcar service going to the West 5th Street Depot. As a streetcar facility, it featured a concrete storage garage at its north end, and a two-floor passenger terminal building at its south end facing Surf Avenue, with seven track loops in the center of the complex for terminating streetcars. The passenger concourse featured a restaurant, and a carousel which would later be moved to Manhattan to become the Central Park Carousel. The depot would be absorbed into municipal operations during unification in 1940.

On October 30, 1956, the last streetcars operated to the depot along McDonald Avenue, at which point it was likely converted for bus service. The bus depot was closed on July 27, 1960, replaced by the Fresh Pond Depot in Queens. The depot was closed due to traffic congestion in Coney Island. By 1962, the site of the depot and former terminal was cleared. It is now the site of the Brightwater Towers apartment complex, built in the 1960s shortly after the depot was demolished.

=== 12th Street Depot ===
The 12th Street Depot was located at East 12th Street between 1st Avenue & Avenue A in Lower Manhattan. It used to be a taxi garage. It was acquired from the Fifth Avenue Coach Company in 1962. As a bus depot, the facility could only house 50-60 buses, which were assigned to Lower Manhattan routes such as the M12 (discontinued in 1979), M13, and M14A/M14D. The remaining buses on the routes came from depots in Midtown and Upper Manhattan, or were stored on the street. The depot was closed and replaced by the Hudson Pier Depot in 1971.

=== 37th Street Depot ===
The 37th Street Depot or 39th Street Depot was located west of Second Avenue between 37th and 39th Streets along the Gowanus Bay portion of the Upper New York Bay in the South Brooklyn Marine Terminal in Greenwood, Brooklyn (40°39′30″N 74°00′40″W). Located across from many former Bush Terminal buildings, it was adjacent to the coastal yard of the South Brooklyn Railway, and west of the current Jackie Gleason Depot and 36th–38th Street Yard. The site consisted of two buildings purchased from the Department of Marine and Aviation in 1948, storing 200 buses.

The depot was near the former 39th Street Ferry Terminal, served by Church Avenue Line streetcars until 1956.

=== 54th Street Depot ===
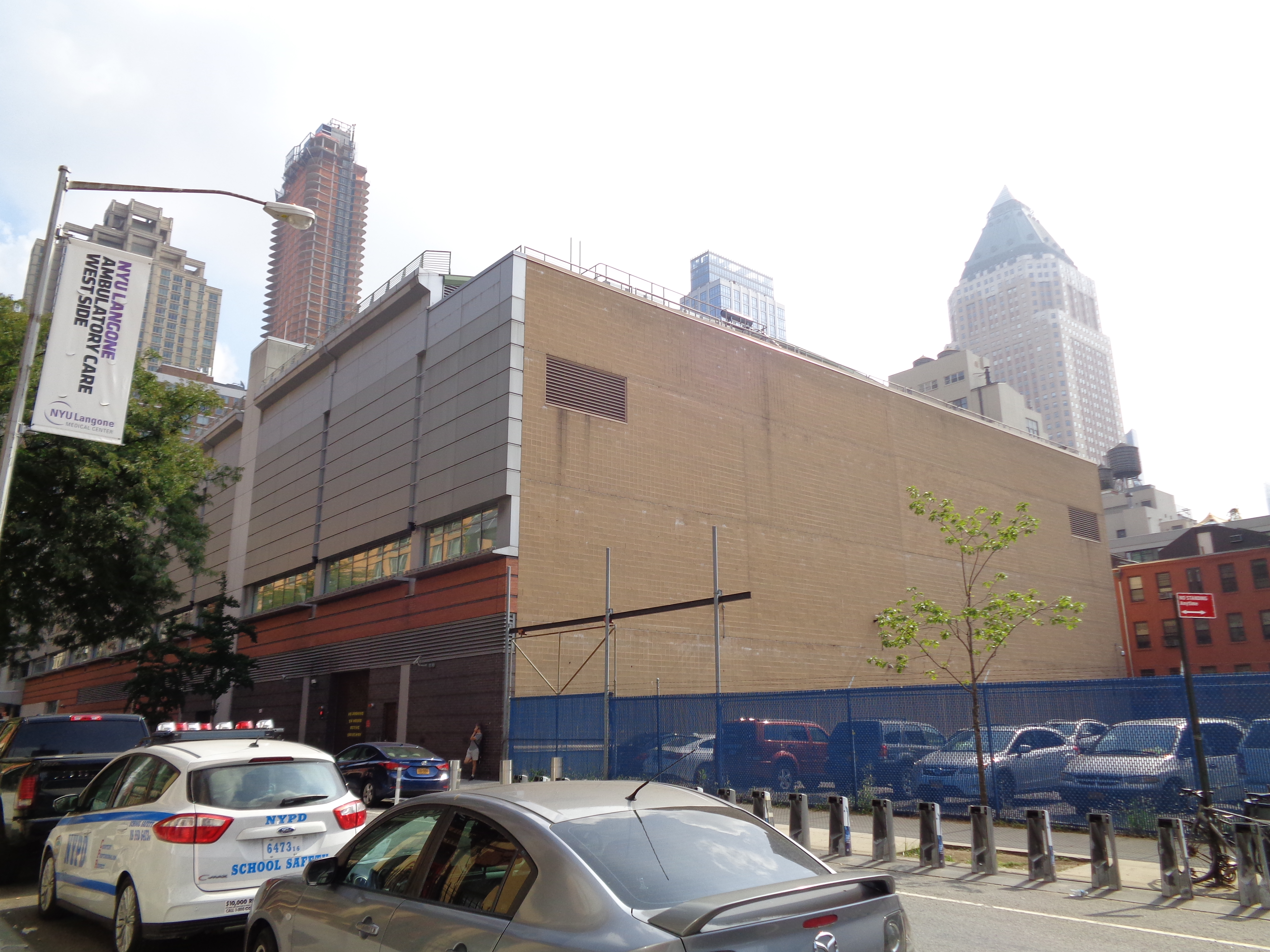
The current NYCT rail command center, on the former site of the 54th Street Depot

The 54th Street Depot was located on Ninth Avenue, between 53rd Street, and 54th Street streets in Midtown Manhattan (40.765227°N 73.985540°W). The address was 806 Ninth Avenue. It was built as the Ninth Ave. car barn of the Ninth Avenue Railroad in the late 1800s. The streetcar line was replaced by Fifth Avenue Coach Company buses on November 12, 1935, and the facility became a bus depot for the company. In March 1962, it fell under municipal operations. This depot was closed in 1992 and replaced by the newly rebuilt Manhattanville Depot, and was demolished between 1996 and 1997, and replaced by the Rapid Transit Division's Rail Command Control Center, at 354 West 54th Street between Eighth and Ninth Avenues. Before it closed in 1992, it operated the following Manhattan bus routes, M6, M7, M11, M42, M27/M50, M57, M72, and M79.

The contract for the command center was awarded in November 1997, with the intent of creating a central control room for the New York City Subway that would implement automation of the system, including automatic train protection. The use of non-union labor by the construction contractor led to a protest by thousands of union members at the site and at the MTA's midtown headquarters in June 1998. Adjacent to the control center is an NYCT parking lot on the east side of Ninth Avenue. The parking lot is planned to be redeveloped into affordable housing as part of the "Western Rail Yard" project, which would redevelop this site and the West Side Yard on West 33rd Street.

=== 126th Street Depot ===
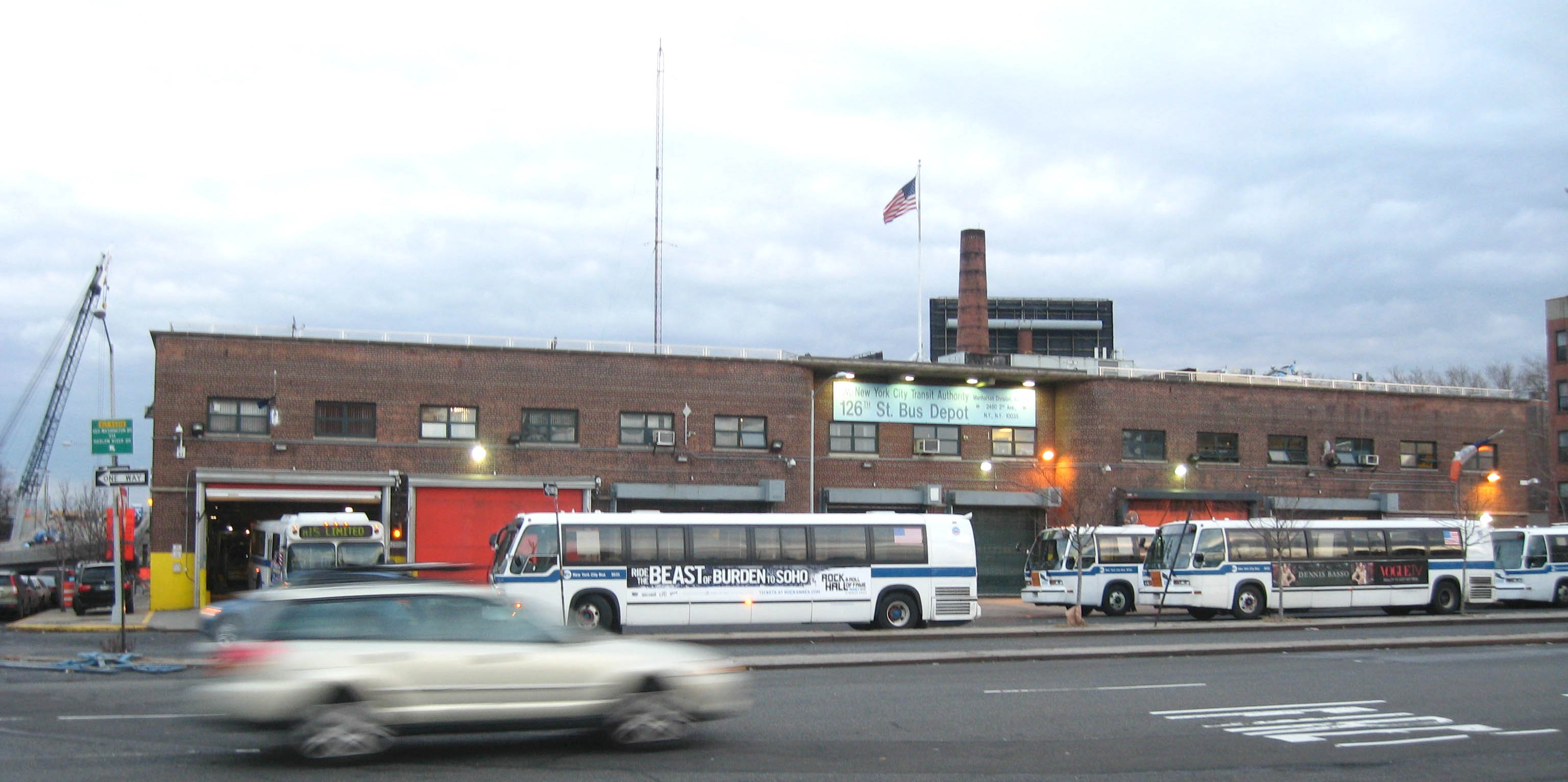
A D60HF leaving 126th Street Depot onto the M15 Limited, plus four RTSs outside the depot

The 126th Street Depot fills the city block bounded by First Avenue, Second Avenue, and 126th and 127th Streets, near the Harlem River Drive, Triborough Bridge, and Willis Avenue Bridge in East Harlem, Manhattan. The address is 2460 Second Avenue (40.803556°N 73.932320°W), and the depot's decal has "126" in Roman numerals (CXXVI). A former trolley yard, the site was opened as a Central Bronx bus depot in 1947 by Surface Transit Inc., the successor to the streetcars of the Third Avenue Railway. It would later be used by the New York City Omnibus Corporation until 1962, when it would be taken over by the Transit Authority (as opposed to its MaBSTOA subsidiary) when its parent company Fifth Avenue Coach folded. It housed the buses (and served as a northern terminal) for the M15 and M15 SBS, the second busiest bus route in the United States and the busiest in the city carrying over 60,000 passengers a day. Before it closed for the first time in 2015, it operated four additional local lines: M31, M35, M60 SBS, and during peak hours, the M116. It was briefly reactivated in 2021 to temporarily store malfunctioning new Nova LFS hybrid buses.

Several structures have occupied the site since the beginning of European settlement of the area. In the late 19th century, an amusement park and dance hall were erected on the site. It then was used by the Cosmopolitan Productions studio owned by William Randolph Hearst until 1923. In 2008, a historical 17th century African American burial ground used by the Low Dutch Reformed Church of Harlem, the first church in Harlem, and its successor the Elmendorf Reformed Church, was discovered at the site. The MTA consequently agreed to move most of the depot's routes to the reopened Mother Clara Hale Depot. The 126th Street Depot closed on January 4, 2015, with the land returned to the city; it was slated to be demolished.

Two outdoor annexes are located near the depot, one across of Second Avenue, and one two blocks north on East 128th Street, adjacent to Harlem River Park. The lot on 126th Street is used for bus storage and employee parking. The 128th Street facility is used to store express buses during midday hours. These facilities were added in 1989 and 1991, and in the mid 2000s. The 128th Street annex is on the former site of the storage yard for the 129th Street Station of the Second and Third Avenue elevated lines.

=== Bergen Street Depot ===
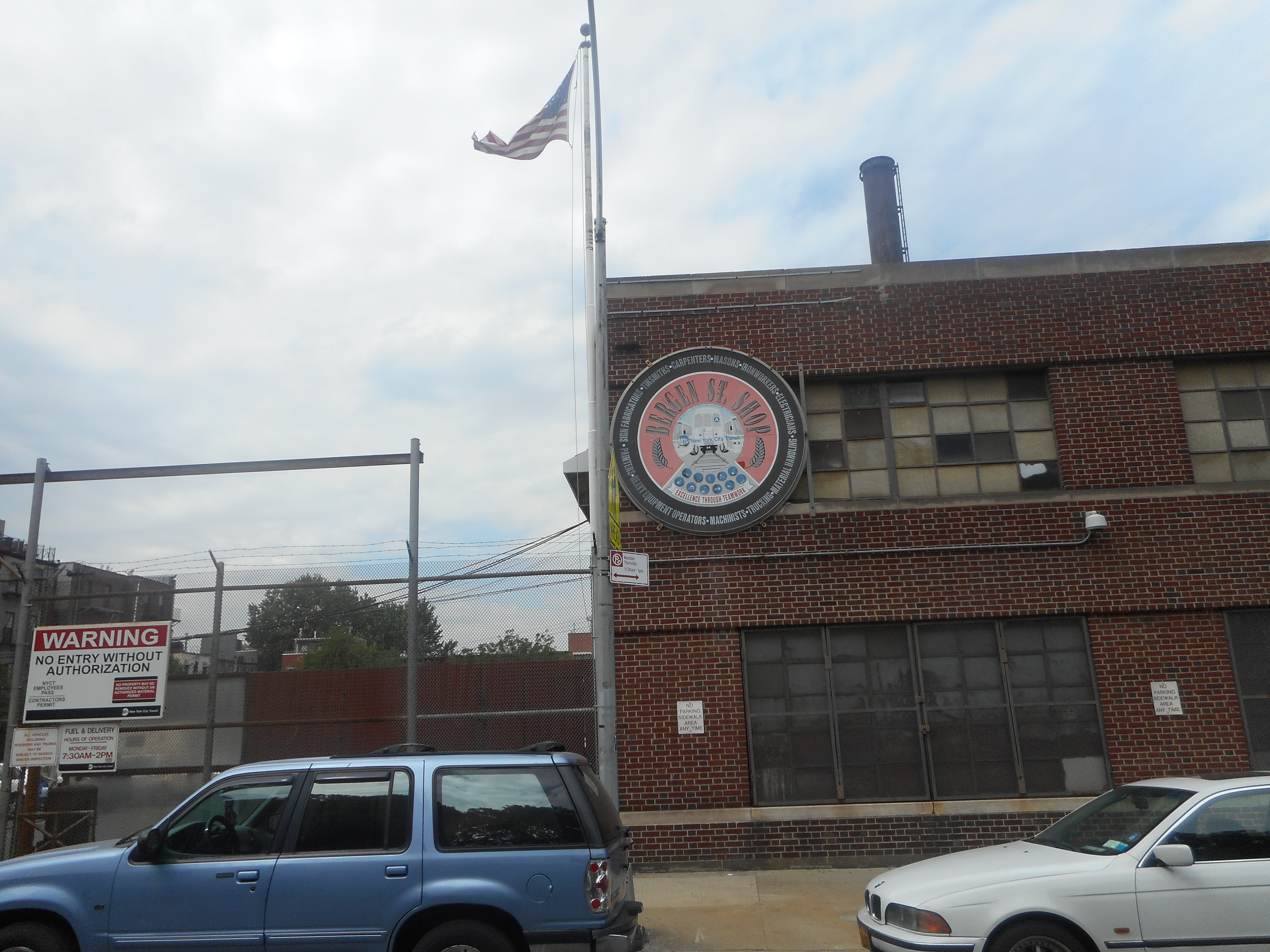
The former Bergen Street Depot, now an MTA Sign Shop

The Bergen Street Shop is located at 1415 Bergen Street/1504 Dean Street between Albany and Troy Avenues in Crown Heights, Brooklyn (40.675599°N 73.937884°W). The facility is bound by Dean Street at its north end and Bergen Street at its south end. It currently serves as the New York City Transit Sign Shop (also called the Bergen Sign Shop or Bergen Street Sign Shop), producing numerous signs for the Transit Authority, particularly those used in the New York City Subway. It was originally the Bergen Street Trolley Coach Depot, operated as a streetcar barn by the Brooklyn, Queens County and Suburban Railroad, and later under the BRT/BMT system until unification in 1940. It was reconstructed and enlarged under city operations between 1947 and 1948, and reopened on September 16, 1948, as a trolleybus (trolley coach) depot. The depot served the Bergen Street Line (B65), Lorimer Street Line (B48), St. Johns Place Line (B45), Graham Avenue Line and Tompkins Avenue Line (B43), and Flushing Avenue Line (B57). The depot stored 122 trolley coaches, and may have also stored diesel buses. The building was converted into the current sign shop when trolleybus service ended on July 27, 1960, replaced by the Fresh Pond Depot in Queens.

=== Brook Street Depot ===
Brook Street Depot is located at 100 Brook Street/539 Jersey Street in Tompkinsville, Staten Island (40.636411°N 74.084085°W). The site is bound by Brook Street to the north, Victory Boulevard to the south, Pike Street to the east, and Jersey Street and Castleton Avenue to the west. It was originally a streetcar barn built around 1902 for the Richmond Light and Railroad Company, which became Richmond Railways in 1927. The barn became a bus depot for the successor Staten Island Coach Company between 1934 and 1937. The depot was taken over by Isle Transportation in 1946. It was acquired by the city Board of Transportation in 1947, and was rebuilt in the late 1940s for municipal bus operations. The new depot was designed to store 100 buses. In 1958 the depot, now under the control of the New York City Transit Authority, was turned over to the New York City Board of Estimate. That year, it was converted into a garage for the New York City Department of Sanitation (DSNY). In response to local community opposition of the site, the city plans to replace the depot with a new DSNY garage on the West Shore near the former Fresh Kills Landfill, while the old depot is planned to be replaced with a residential development.

=== Crosstown Depot ===
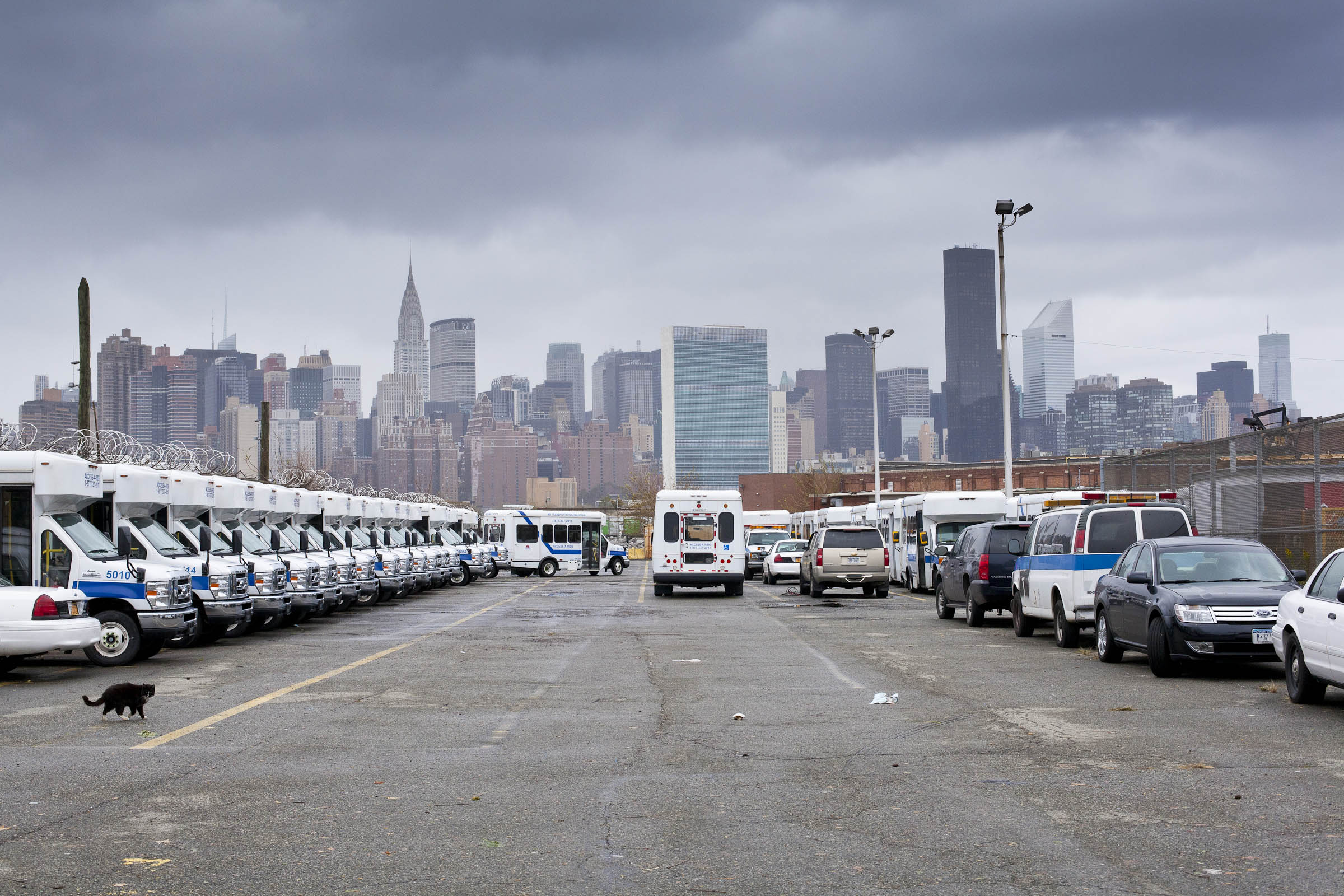
Access-A-Ride vehicles stored at the Crosstown Depot.

The Crosstown Depot, (formerly Greenpoint Trolley Depot), and also referred to as the Crosstown Annex Facility or Crosstown Paint Shop, is located at 55/65 Commercial Street near the intersection of Commercial and Box Streets in the neighborhood of Greenpoint, Brooklyn, on the southern shore of Newtown Creek (40.737072°N 73.957400°W).

The first Crosstown Depot was opened in 1885 as a streetcar depot by the Brooklyn Heights Railroad, located at Manhattan Avenue between Box and Clay Streets. It later become part of the BRT/BMT system under the Brooklyn and Queens Transit Corporation (B&QT). The original depot consisted of a two-story brick building, with trolley loops at ground level used for turning trolleys. Around 1945, the depot was no longer used for streetcar operations. In September 1951, the old Crosstown Depot was sold by the Board of Transportation and used as a warehouse for a box manufacturer. On June 30, 1952, the depot was the origin point of an eight-alarm fire that killed at least one person and destroyed 15 buildings including the depot.

The site on Commercial Street was originally a refinery for the American Sugar Refining Company (predecessor to Domino Sugar) opened in 1868, and later became a trolley storage yard and washing facility for the B&QT. In 1946 the Board of Transportation began constructing a new facility on this site, opened in July 1949 as the Crosstown Trolley Coach and Car Depot to serve 78 trolley coaches and 60 trolley cars. It was fully converted into a bus depot in 1954. The current depot consists of a two-story brick administration building facing Commercial Street, and shop for repairs, inspection and washing facing Newtown Creek, along with a large storage lot for buses. The depot holds around 120 buses at capacity. At one time, it operated ten lines: B18 (discontinued), B24, B29 (now part of the B24), B30 (discontinued), B39 (discontinued/reestablished 2013), B48, B59 (now Q59), B60, B61 (originally the Crosstown Line, since split into a new B61 and B62), and B62 (now part of the B43). The B62's northern terminal was located one block away from the depot at Manhattan Avenue and Box Street. The depot operations ended on November 7, 1981, because of service reductions and operating cost. It later stored several new General Motors-built RTS-04 buses awaiting entry into revenue service in 1982.

The Crosstown Depot has since been converted to a paint shop and road service operations facility, located in the former repair shop. The facility contains three paint booths to paint MTA buses, the third of which was installed in 2001. The paint shop operations were consolidated into those of the Grand Avenue Facility when the latter opened in 2008. The site also houses the New York City Subway's Department of Emergency Response in the former administration building, and an Access-A-Ride storage facility utilizing the former bus storage area. The site is planned for redevelopment into a waterfront park, called "Box Street Park".

=== DeKalb Depot ===
The DeKalb Depot, also known as the DeKalb Avenue Depot or DeKalb Avenue Shops, was located on the east side of DeKalb Avenue between Onderdonk and Seneca Avenues in Ridgewood, Queens. It was built as a trolley barn by the Brooklyn City Railroad in the early 20th century, later becoming part of the BRT/BMT system. It served several streetcar lines, including the DeKalb Avenue Line (today's B38), while its shops performed heavy maintenance. The facility was absorbed into municipal operations in 1940, and was converted into a trolley coach repair shop in April 1949. The site is now occupied by a supermarket, sitting across from the athletic field of Grover Cleveland High School.

=== Edgewater Depot ===
The Edgewater Depot, also called Edgewater Pier, was located at 60/171 Edgewater Street on the coastline of Rosebank, Staten Island (40.619279°N 74.068309°W), the former area of the Pouch Terminal (Piers 20 and 21). It was leased from Pouch Terminal, Inc. in 1977, and used to relieve overcrowding at the Staten Island Depot (now Castleton Avenue Depot), which had been the only bus depot in the borough. It was later discovered that the terminal was about to be foreclosed, and could have been acquired by the city at no cost. A fire destroyed Pier 20 in 1978, rendering the depot useless until 1983. During that time, the depot stored several new General Motors-built RTS-04 buses awaiting entry into revenue service in 1982. On February 18, 1983, two GMC fishbowl buses on loan from Washington DC's Washington Metropolitan Area Transit Authority (WMATA) fell into the Narrows after one of its piers collapsed. Although the TA initially planned to rehabilitate the depot, Edgewater was permanently abandoned in 1985 when it was found to be structurally unsafe for use as a bus depot.

An office building is located near the site, at 1 Edgewater Street or 1 Edgewater Plaza, used by the MTA, Staten Island Community Board 1, and other organizations. It was originally a Pouch Terminal warehouse, re-purposed for office use from 1973 to the 1980s.

=== Hudson Depot ===
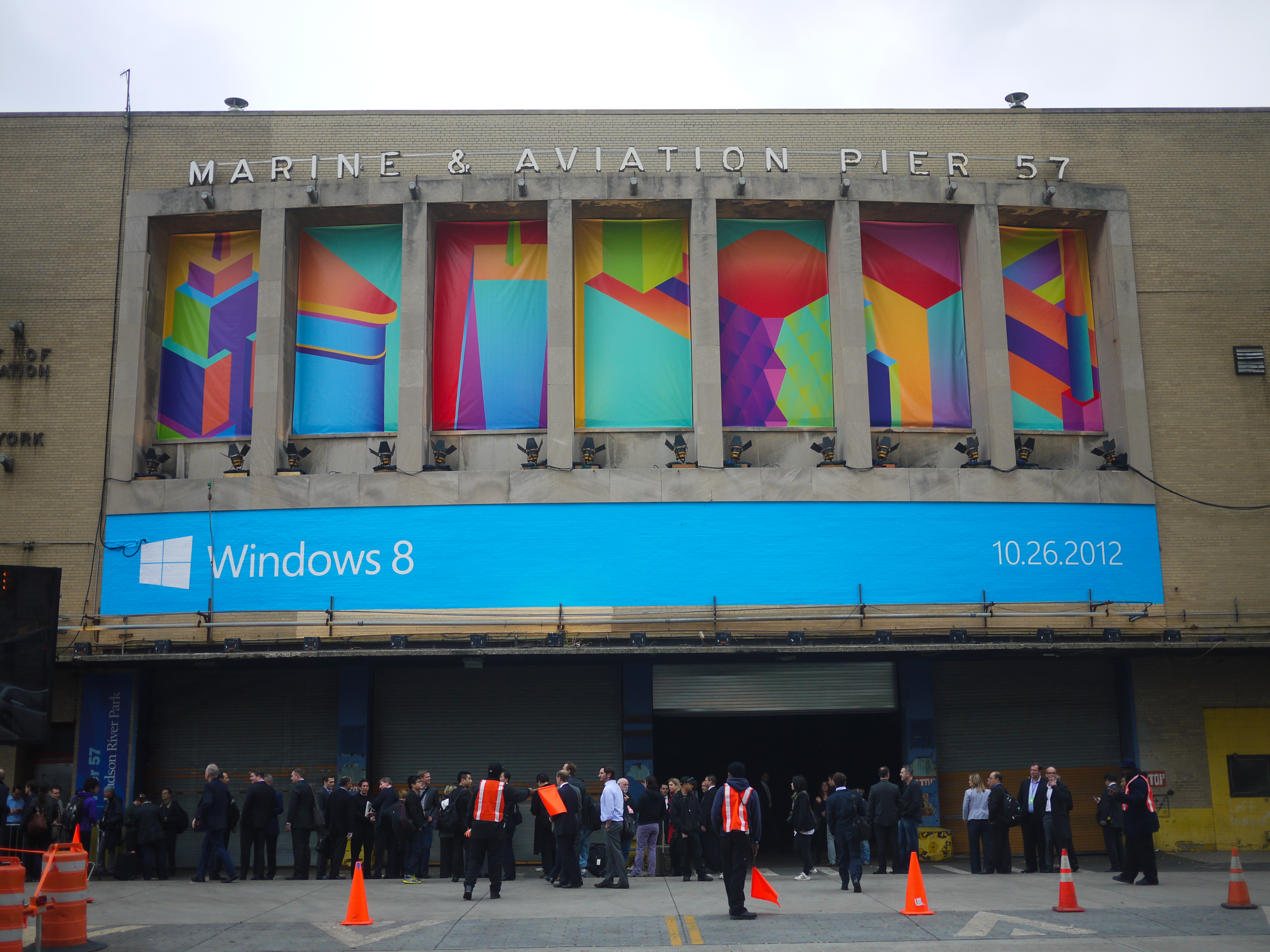
The front facade of Pier 57 in 2012

The Hudson Depot or Hudson Pier Depot was located on Hudson River Pier 57 at 15th Street in the present Hudson River Park in Chelsea, Manhattan (40.743520°N 74.010386°W). The address was 11 11th Avenue. This depot was built from 1950 to 1954 as a shipping pier. The pier was abandoned in 1967 by Grace Line and remained unused for several years. In December 1971, the New York City Transit Authority took possession of the vacant building, and upgraded it to facilitate bus fueling and storage. This was opposed by the International Longshoremen's Association, who desired the facility to be reactivated for maritime operations, and by local civic organizations. The depot opened on September 11, 1972, replacing the 12th Street Depot, and providing indoor storage for over 200 buses previously parked on city streets. It held up to 165 buses. The Hudson Depot was intended to be temporary, but was kept in service when plans to construct new depots failed, and due to the closure of the 54th Street Depot. The depot was closed on September 7, 2003, the same day the 100th Street Depot reopened, and its routes such as the M6, M8, M9, M11, M14A/M14D, M21, M22, M16/M34, and half of the Q32 were transferred to the Michael J. Quill Depot (except the M11, which was transferred to Manhattanville, and later some M11 runs were shared with Michael J. Quill Depot in an effort to ease the severe overcrowding at Manhattanville Depot, where many of their buses are stored on the local streets during nighttime hours).

=== Meredith Avenue Depot ===
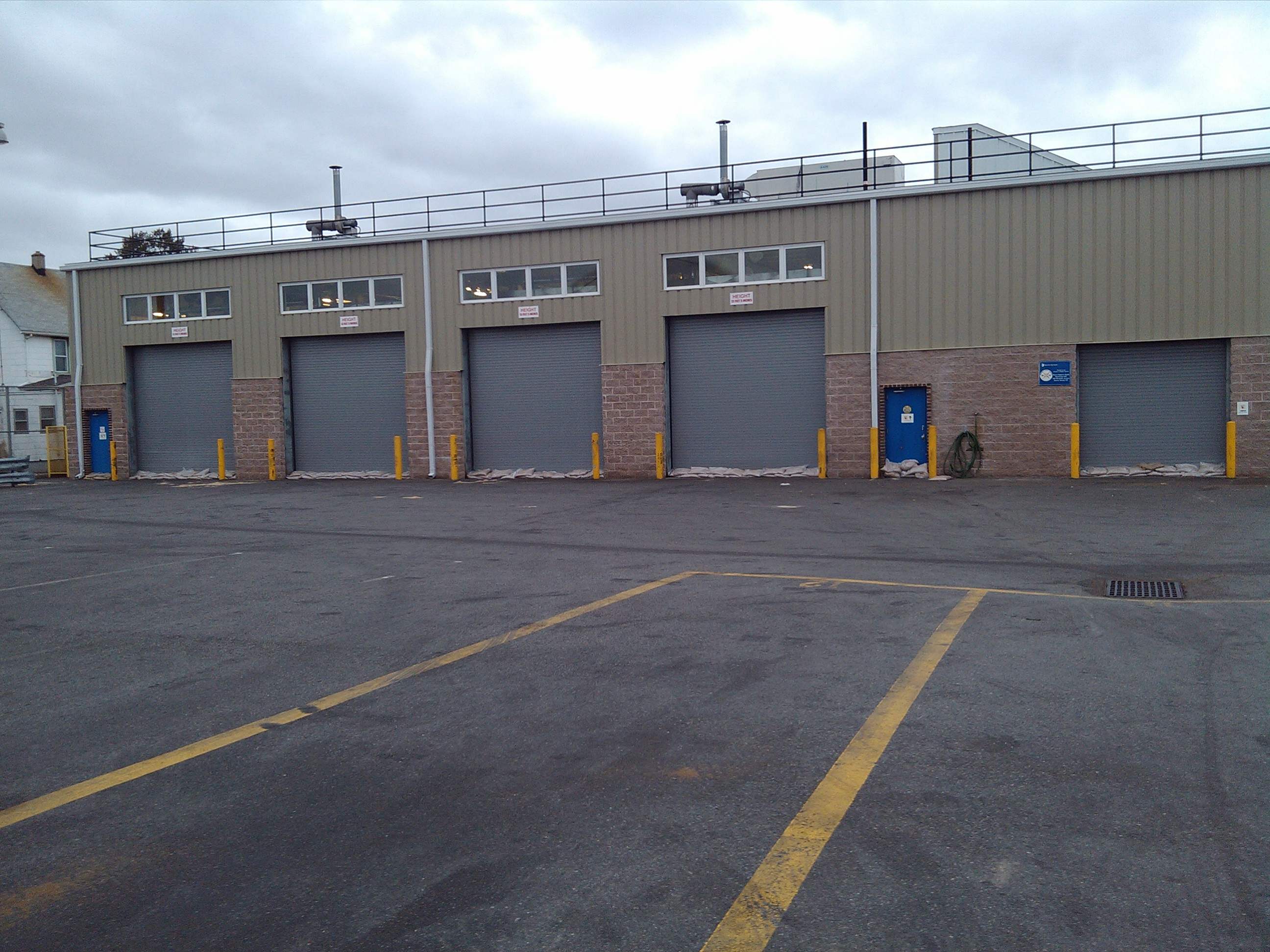
Meredith Avenue Depot

The Meredith Avenue Depot or Meredith Depot was located at 280 and 336 Meredith Avenue, at the intersection of Meredith Avenue and South Avenue (formerly Chelsea Road) near the shoreline of Arthur Kill and Prall's Island in Chelsea (40.600570°N 74.196001°W). This depot was constructed in 2009 to expand storage capacity in the borough, with the MTA operating the site on a 15-year lease. The depot was built on largely vacant land, with the exception of an 1890s-era house. It had space for 80 buses, and light maintenance facilities. It used to operate only from Monday to Friday, and used to only house exclusively express buses, which were rotated from the other Staten Island depots. Meredith Avenue Depot was closed due to damage from Hurricane Sandy, and reopened. The depot would later close permanently on January 3, 2025. The following routes were operated by this depot, many of which were shared with other Staten Island depots: SIM3, SIM4X, SIM15, SIM30, SIM32, SIM33, SIM33C, SIM34, SIM35.

=== Walnut Depot ===
The Walnut Depot or Walnut Avenue Depot was located on the south side of 132nd Street at Walnut Avenue east of the Hell Gate Bridge in Port Morris, Bronx, on the coastline of the East River and the mouth of the Bronx Kill (40.798224°N 73.912677°W). The address was 900 East 132nd Street. NYCTA bought the former warehouse from the F. W. Woolworth Company for $1.8 million in 1979, and rebuilt it into an operating bus depot, and opened it to buses on April 3, 1983, replacing the old and dilapidated West Farms Depot which was closed on the same date, and also to relieve overcrowding at the existing Coliseum and Kingsbridge Depots. On February 21, 1993, the Walnut depot closed for rehabilation and was replaced by the current Kingsbridge Depot which reopened that same day after undergoing reconstruction. Walnut reopened in 1995 and replaced the Coliseum Depot, which by then closed for rehabilitation as well. The depot was planned to be closed around 2000, but was abruptly sold in early 1998 to the Empire State Development Corporation and later the Galesi Group for the construction of a new printing plant for the New York Post. Walnut Depot permanently closed in spring 1998, replaced by the Michael J. Quill Depot. At the time of its closure, it housed 220 buses, and operated the following Bronx routes: Bx4, Bx5, Bx6, Bx11, Bx13, Bx15, Bx17, Bx19, Bx21, Bx27, Bx32, Bx35, and Bx36. The depot was demolished in order to construct the Post printing plant, which also permanently closed down recently.

=== West Farms Depot (old) ===
The West Farms Depot was located at 1857 Boston Road, just north of the 174th Street subway station in the Crotona Park East section of the Bronx (40.838570°N 73.886526°W). The site consisted of two maintenance buildings, one on a triangular plot bound by East 175th Street, Southern Boulevard, and Boston Road, and the second on the north side of 175th Street and the Cross Bronx Expressway on the east. Built in 1894 by the Union Railway as a car barn, it was used to store and maintain buses until April 3, 1983, when it was closed and replaced by the Walnut Depot, and later the Gun Hill Depot. Before it closed in early 1983, it serviced the following Bronx Local Routes; Bx3 Prospect/Crotona Av's (now Bx17), Bx11 170 Street/Claremont Pkwy. Crosstown, Bx25 Morris/Jerome Av's (now Bx32), Bx26 Boston Road/Morris Park Av (now Bx21), Bx28 Williamsbridge (now Bx39), Bx29 125 Street X-Town & Willis/Third Av's (now Bx15/Bx15 LTD & the M125), Bx31 145/149 Street X-Town & Southern Blvd (now Bx19), Bx32 Saint Ann's Avenue (discontinued in 1984), Bx34 155/163 Street Crosstown & Hunts Point Av (now Bx6/Bx6SBS), Bx35 167/169 Street's Crosstown, Bx41 Webster Av-White Plains Road, Bx42 Westchester Avenue (now Bx4/Bx4A), and Bx49 Highbridge (discontinued and combined with Bx13). The buildings continued to stand as recently as 2002, decaying and becoming havens for crime. The depot has since been demolished, replaced by housing developments and a self storage facility. The nearby Coliseum Depot was renamed the West Farms Depot when it reopened in 2003.
