= Intercar =

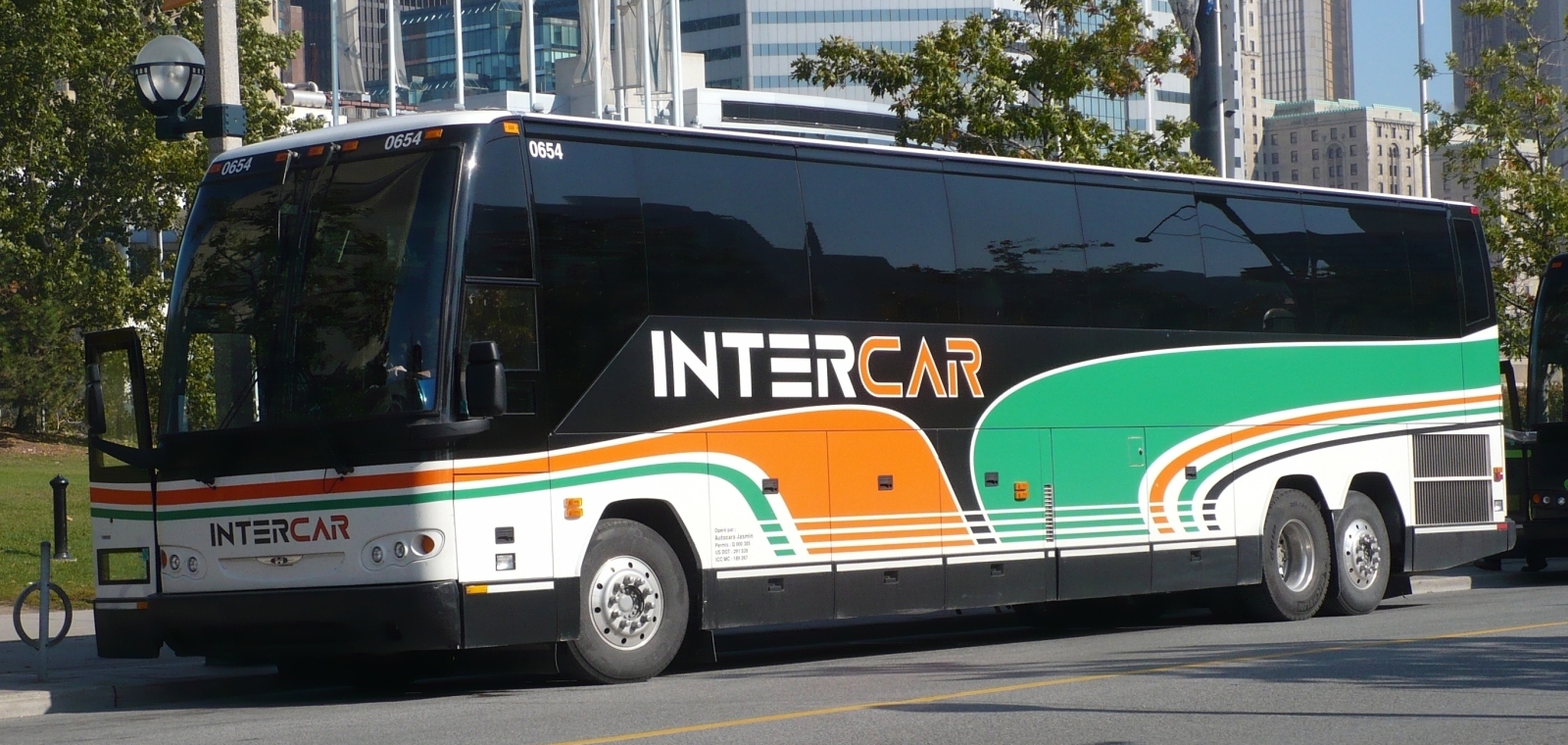
- Founded: 1959
- Headquarters: 2249, rue Saint-Hubert; Saguenay, Quebec; G7X 5P1
- Service type: coach, school bus, paratransit
- Hubs: Jonquière, Chicoutimi, Quebec City
- Fleet: 375
- Chief executive: Hugo Gilbert
- Website: intercar.ca/en

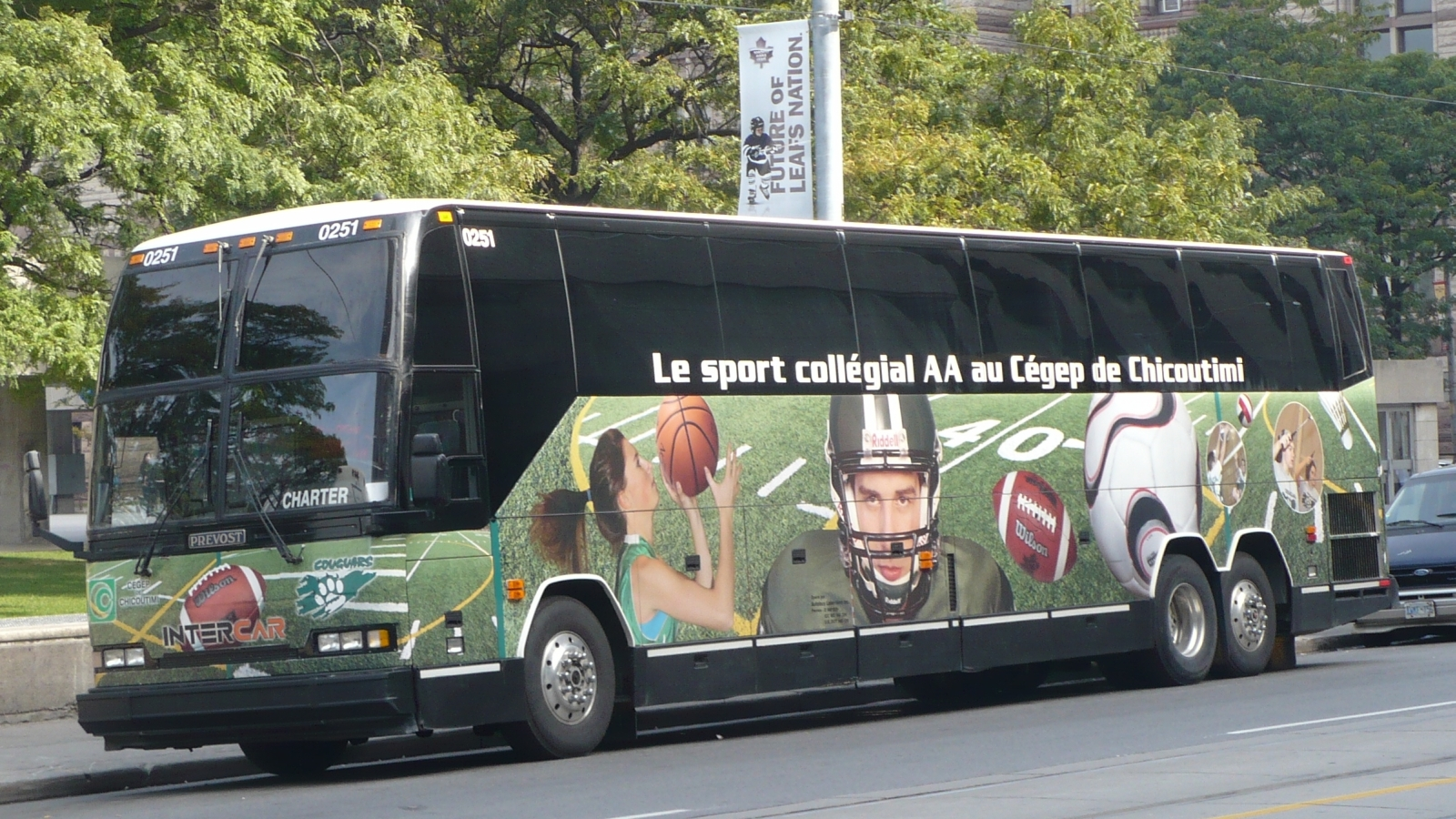
Wrapped coach advertising the sports programs of the Cégep de Chicoutmi

Intercar is the second largest interurban bus carrier within the province of Quebec, Canada, and one of the largest providers of school buses. The company was founded in 1959 in Jonquière, but expanded greatly in 1990 with the acquisition of Voyageur's routes in the Saguenay–Lac-Saint-Jean region and the North Coast of the Saint Lawrence River. The next step in the evolution of the Intercar Group, already well established in student transportation in Saguenay-Lac-Saint-Jean, was the launch of school bus services in the area around Quebec City. Further expansion of their interurban routes to Sept-Îles meant that by 2001 they dominated those services in the triangle between Sept-Iles, Dolbeau and Quebec. Throughout the early part of this century they have continued to acquire more school transportation companies and further grow their charter service.

== Divisions ==
The group website provides a helpful list of waypoints and bus stop locations. Operations are based around three centres in Jonquière, Chicoutimi and Quebec City.
Subsidiaries which operate from these locations are:

- Jonquiere
  - Autobus Jasmin
  - Intercar Saguenay
  - Autobus Gilbert
  - Autobus JDJ
  - Intercar du Fjord
  - Intercar Chibougamau
- Québec
  - Intercar Inc.
  - Intercar Atlantique
  - Autocar Fournier
  - Transport adapté Intercar
  - Transport scolaire Intercar
- Chicoutimi
  - Autobus Laterrière
  - Intercar La Baie
  - Paul Tremblay Transport
  - Autobus Tremblay & Tremblay
  - Intercar Inc.
  - Transports spécialisés du Saguenay

== Expedibus ==

Expedibus is a package shipping and courier company, operated cooperatively throughout Quebec by Orléans Express, Intercar, Autobus Maheux and Limocar.

== Fleet ==
- GMC PD 4107
- GMC PD 4905
- MCI MC-8
- MCI MC-9
- MCI 102A3
- MCI J4500
- Prevost Prestige
- Prevost LeMirage
- Prevost H5-60
- Prevost LeMirage XL
- Prevost LeMirage XL-45
- Prevost H3-40
- Prevost H3-41
- Prevost H3-45
- Prevost LeMirage XLII
- Girardin Minibus
- School buses manufactured by Blue Bird and Thomas.
