= Keolis Canada =

Canadian intercity bus operator

Keolis Canada is the Canadian subsidiary of French transportation company Keolis. It operates intercity bus services under the names Orléans Express, Red Arrow Motorcoach, and Ebus.

== Orléans Express ==
Orléans Express

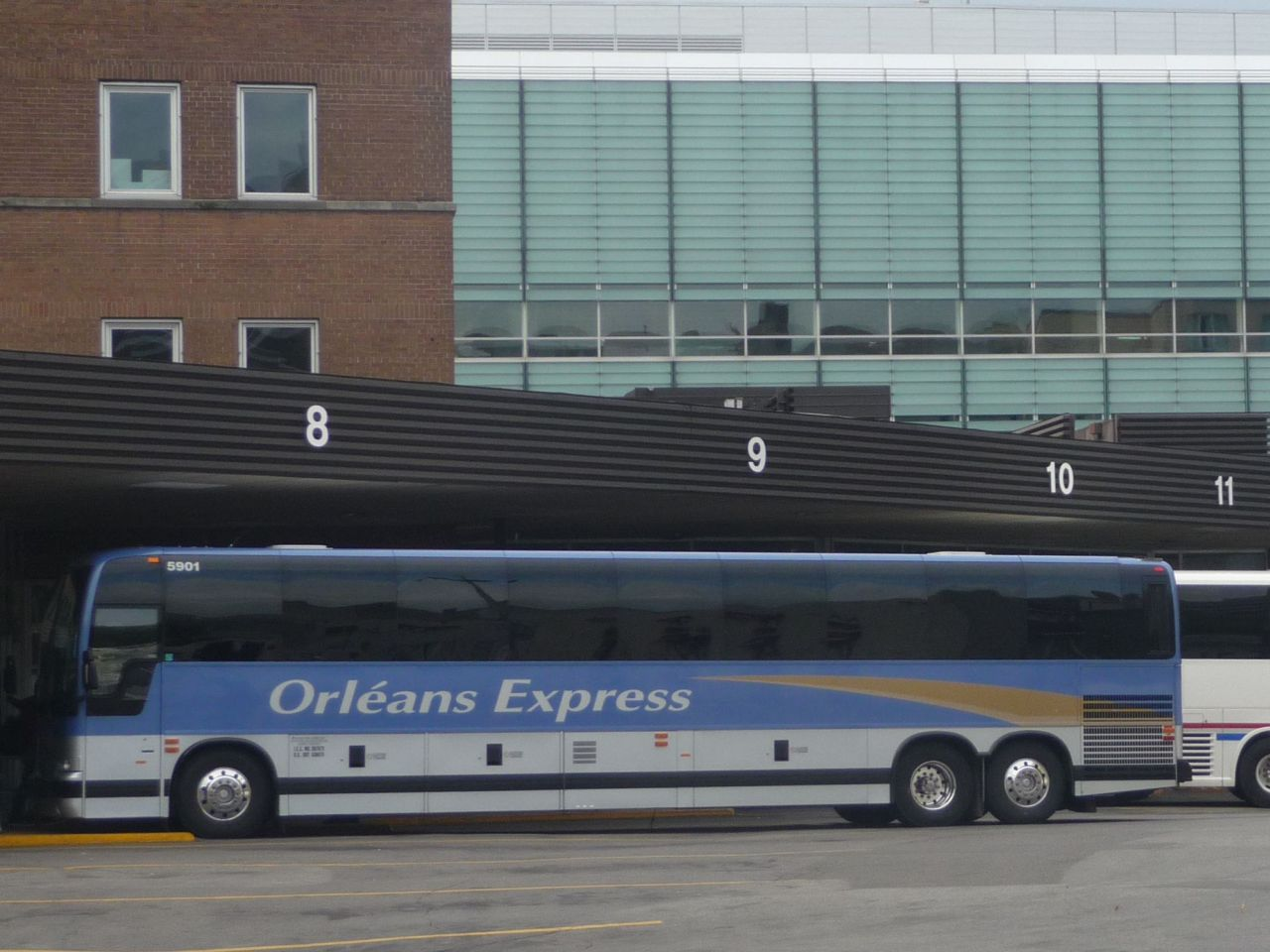
- Parent: Keolis
- Founded: 1990
- Headquarters: Montreal, Quebec
- Service area: Quebec
- Service type: Intercity coach service
- Website: www.orleansexpress.com

Orléans Express is a coach operator in Quebec, Canada. Operations began in 1990 after acquiring a number of routes from Voyageur. Destinations served include Ottawa (ON), Gatineau, Montreal, Trois-Rivières, Quebec City, Rivière-du-Loup, Rimouski, and Gaspé. In 2002, Keolis acquired the company and 2012 wholly owned.

=== Expedibus ===

Expedibus is a package shipping and courier company, operated cooperatively throughout Quebec by Orléans Express, Intercar, Autobus Maheux and Limocar.

== Red Arrow Motorcoach ==
Red Arrow was first launched in 1979 as a luxury coach service between Fort McMurray, Edmonton, and Calgary, Alberta. New routes were added in the 2020s, from Edmonton to Grande Prairie and Calgary to Banff.

Red Arrow began service in Ontario in 2022, from Toronto to Ottawa via Kingston; this was rebranded as Orléans Express in 2025 and later cancelled in 2026.

A service between Vancouver and Kelowna is offered as of 2025.

Red Arrow's fleet consists of Prevost H3-45 coaches equipped as follows: 2+1 seating, wheelchair accessible, seat belts, Wifi, computer plug-ins and a snack galley on board.

== Ebus ==
Ebus service started on October 11, 2011, and operates Prevost H3-45 and X3-45 coaches. This subsidiary of Red Arrow travels between Edmonton, Red Deer, Calgary, and Lethbridge in Alberta as well as Kamloops, Kelowna, Prince George, and Vancouver in British Columbia.

== See also ==
- Acadian Lines, owned by Keolis Canada 2004-2012
- Pacific Western Transportation, former owner of Red Arrow and Ebus
