= Eugène Prévost =

Eugène Prévost may refer to:

- Eugène Prévost (cyclist) (1863–1961), French cyclist
- Eugène Prévost (carpenter) (1898–1965), French Canadian carpenter
- Eugène Prévost (musician) (1809–1872), French composer
