= Allison Bus Series =

Automobile transmission series

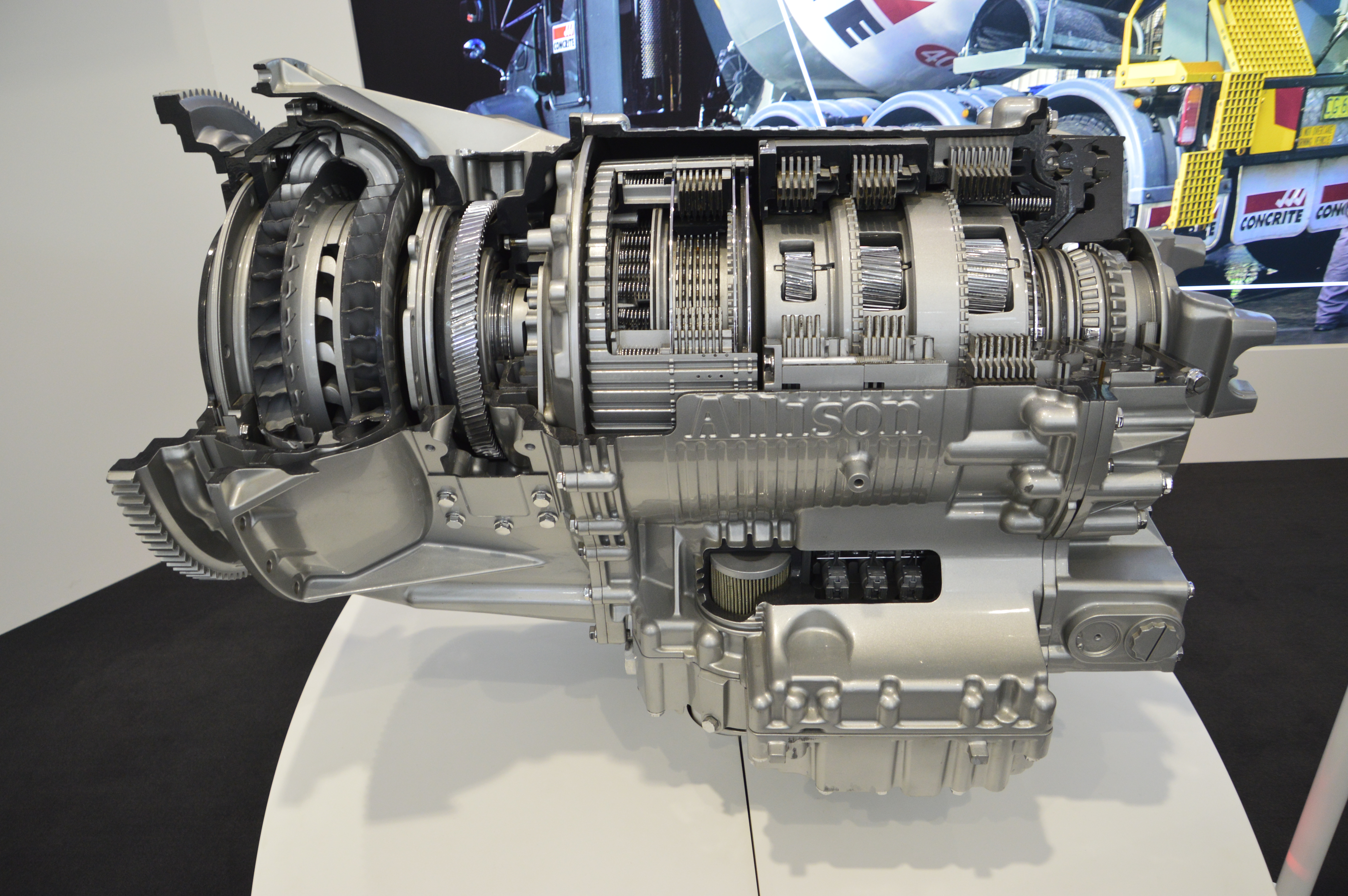
- Cutaway of Allison 4000-series transmission (marketed as B500)
- Classification: Automatic transmission
- Application: transit and highway buses

The Allison Bus Series are medium and heavy duty automatic transmissions for transit buses and highway motorcoaches designed and manufactured by Allison Transmission. Each of the six models in the Bus Series is available in 5 or 6 speeds with an integral hydraulic retarder as an option.

== History ==
In 2015, Allison introduced a new model in the Bus Series. Part of the xFE (extra fuel economy) line, the B3400xFE incorporates optimized gear ratios and features the FuelSense Max electronic control package. New gear ratios also allow the torque converter to lock up at lower speeds. The xFE transmissions boast an up to seven percent improvement in fuel economy over baseline models.

As of 2020, the majority of the 5,700 buses operated by the New York City Transit Authority are equipped with Allison B400 or B500 transmissions.

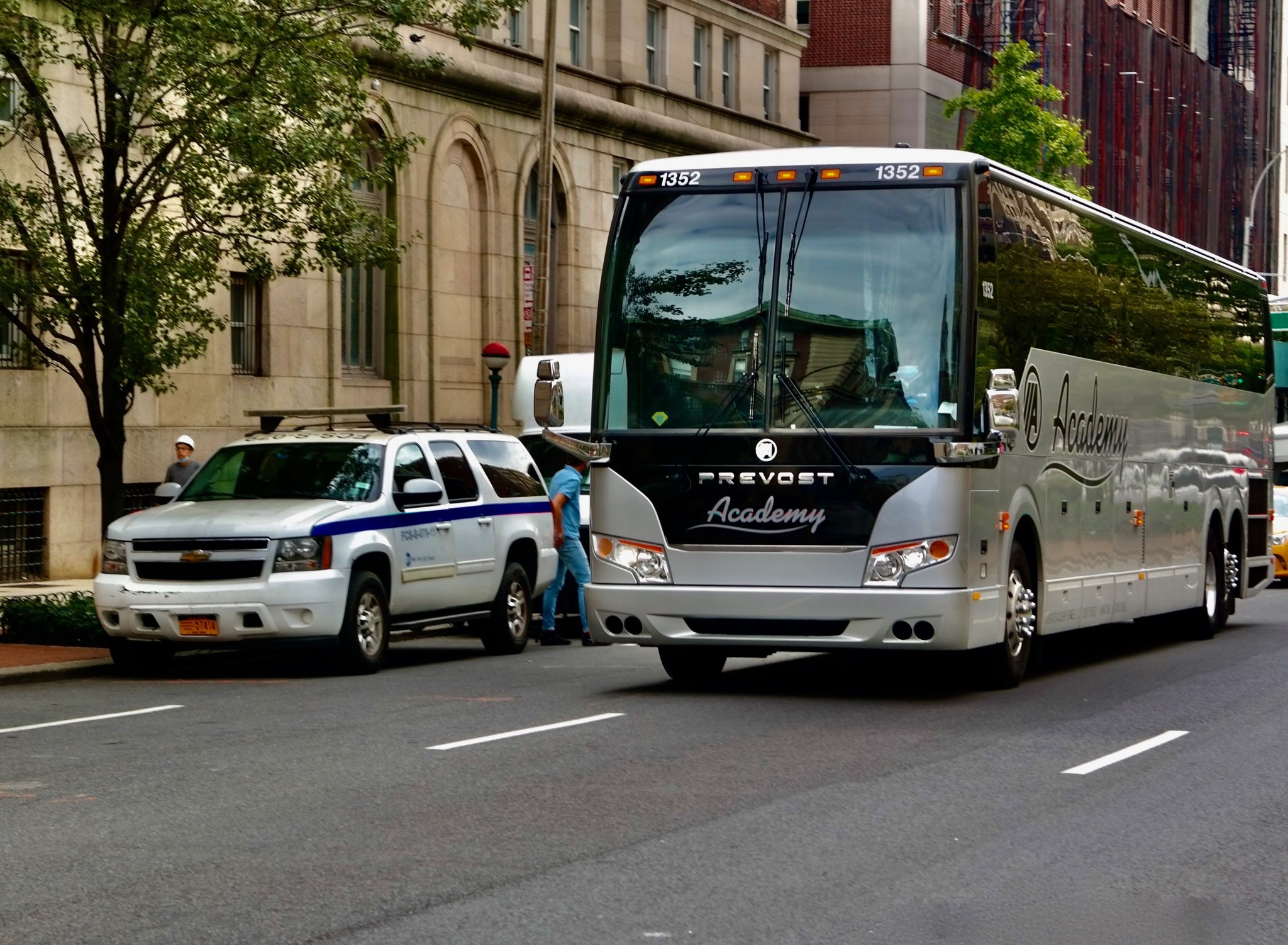
Many coaches, such as this Prévost H3-45, use the B500R.

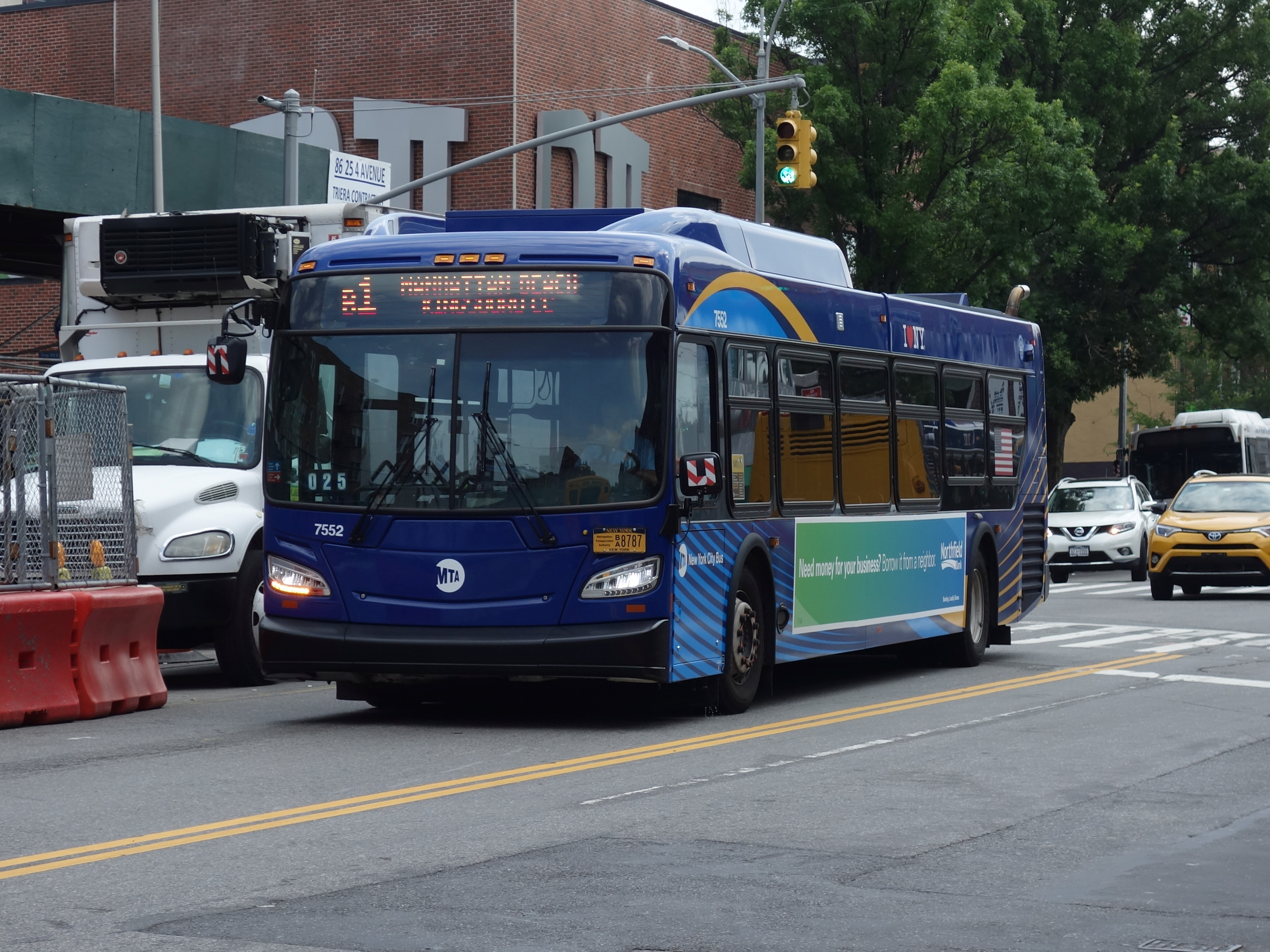
Many rigid transit buses, such as this New Flyer Xcelsior XD40, use the B400R.

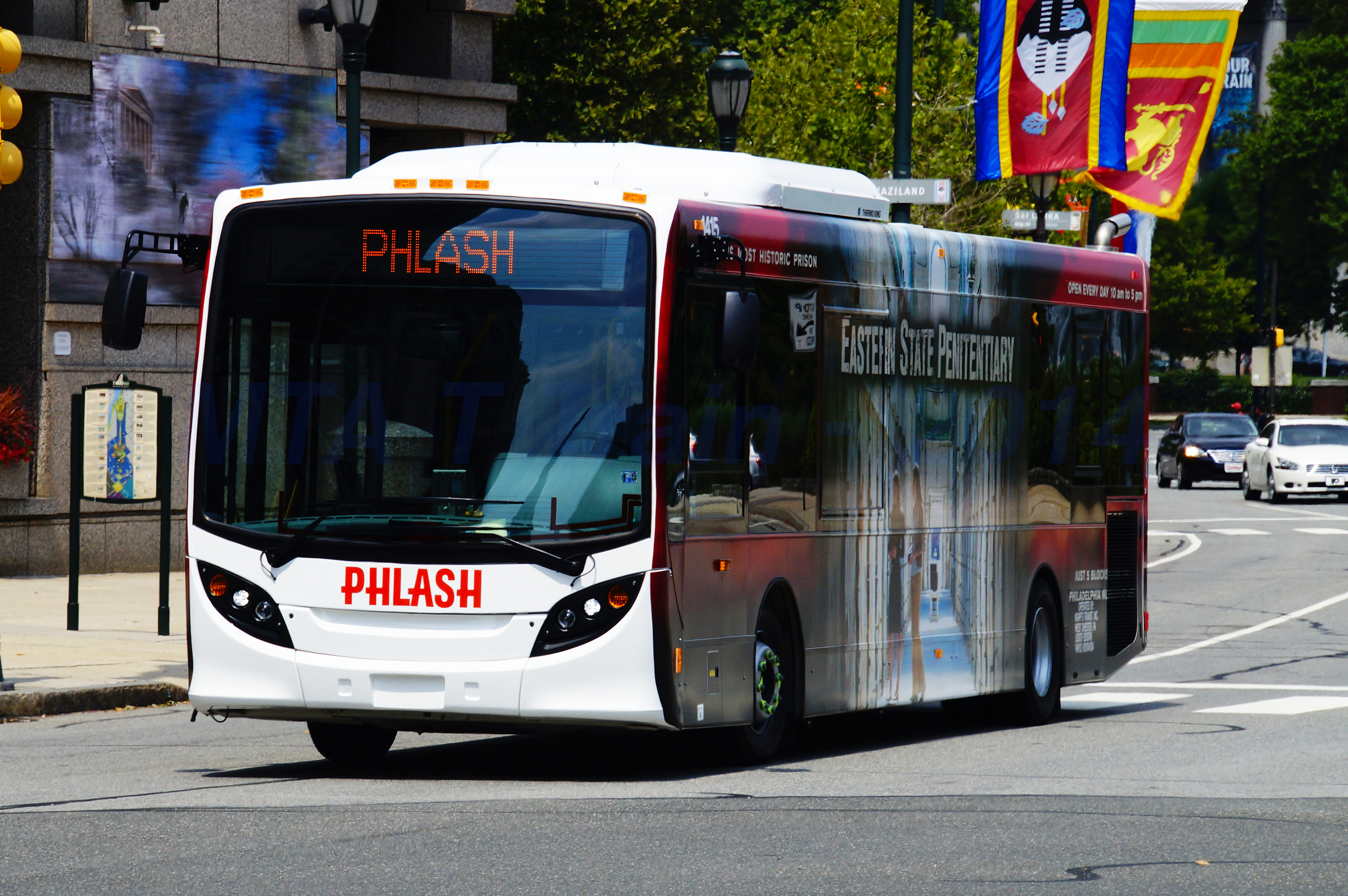
Some smaller midibuses, such as this New Flyer Midi MD35, use the B300R.

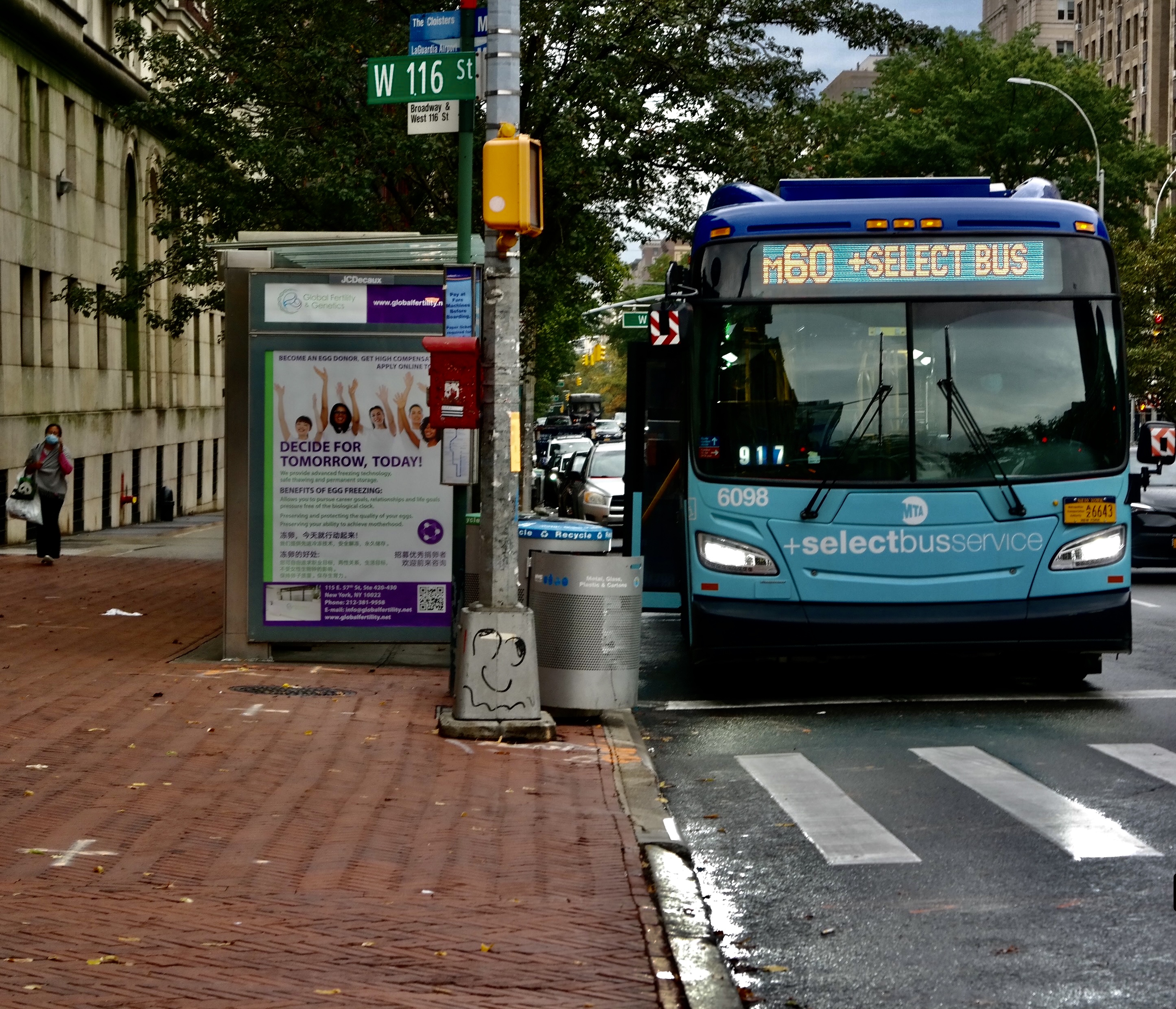
Many articulated buses, such as this New Flyer Xcelsior XD60, also use the B500R.

== Models ==
Allison markets its transmissions by vocational series according to the intended use; for example, the Tractor Series is sold for and installed in Class 8 tractors, while the Motorhome Series is marketed to manufacturers of recreational vehicles. A transmission is given a designation specific to the vocational series, but is otherwise identical mechanically to other transmissions sold for other vocational series; for example, the Bus Series B210 / B220 / B295 transmissions are also sold with identical gearing as:

- 1000HS (Highway Series)
- 1000MH (Motorhome Series)
- 1000EVS (Emergency Vehicle Series)
- 1000RDS (Rugged Duty Series)
- 1000PTS (Pupil Transport/Shuttle Series)
- 1000SP (Specialty Series)
- 1350HS/MH/EVS/RDS/PTS/SP
- 2100HS/MH/EVS/RDS/PTS/SP
- 2200HS/MH/EVS/RDS/PTS/SP
- 2350HS/MH/EVS/RDS/PTS/SP

Collectively, these are grouped into the 1000/2000 Series transmission family; transmissions within a family share the same basic dimensions, power input capabilities, and weight. Allison transmission families for the Bus Series include the 1000/2000 Series (B210, B220, B295), 3000 Series (B300 / B400), and 4000 Series (B500).

Within North America, Bus Series transmissions carry a "B" prefix to distinguish them from other vocational series transmissions manufactured by Allison. Outside of North America, the equivalent transmissions are designated with a "T" prefix, e.g., T3280 xFE, T3325 xFE, and T3375 xFE.

Allison Bus Series transmissions
| Model | Max. Input Power | Max. Input Torque | Mass of Basic Model | Number of Speeds | Retarder? | Found in |
|---|---|---|---|---|---|---|
| B210 | 172 kW (231 hp) | 705 N⋅m (520 lbf⋅ft) | 150 kg (330 lb) | 5 | | Midibuses |
| B220 | 172 kW (231 hp) | 705 N⋅m (520 lbf⋅ft) | 150 kg (330 lb) | 5 | | Midibuses |
| B295 | 172 kW (231 hp) | 841 N⋅m (620 lbf⋅ft) | 150 kg (330 lb) | 5 | | Midibuses |
| B300; B300R | 209 kW (280 hp) | 997 N⋅m (735 lbf⋅ft) | 243 kg (536 lb) | 4, 5 or 6 | | Midibuses |
| B400; B400R | 224 kW (300 hp) for transit 246 kW (330 hp) for touring coach | 1,254–1,356 N⋅m (925–1,000 lbf⋅ft) | 243 kg (536 lb) | 4, 5 or 6 | | Transit buses (rigid); Midsize coaches (30-35 ft long) |
| B3400xFE | 224 kW (300 hp) for transit | 1,254–1,356 N⋅m (925–1,000 lbf⋅ft) | 243 kg (536 lb) | 5 or 6 | | Transit buses (rigid) |
| B500; B500R | 313 kW (420 hp) for transit 410 kW (550 hp) for touring & intercity coach | 1,763 N⋅m (1,300 lbf⋅ft) for transit 2,305 N⋅m (1,700 lbf⋅ft) for touring & intercity coach | 377 kg (831 lb) | 5 or 6 | | Transit buses (articulated); Touring/intercity coaches (40-45 ft long) |
