= Maritime Bus =

Canadian motor coach operator for the Maritime Provinces

- Parent: Coach Atlantic Group
- Founded: August 2012
- Headquarters: 7 Mount Edward Road; Charlottetown, Prince Edward Island; C1A 5R7
- Service area: The Maritimes
- Service type: Intercity coach service
- Stops: 53
- Fleet: 42
- Website: www.maritimebus.com

Maritime Bus is a Canadian coach operator based in Charlottetown, Prince Edward Island. The company began operations on December 1, 2012, after Acadian Lines discontinued service on November 30.

== History ==
Maritime Bus began operations in December 2012, serving 15,500 passengers in its first month. This increased to 16,700 in the month of March and averaged about 15,000 per month for its first year of operation. Its busiest single day of operation was on October 13, 2014 (Thanksgiving Monday) when ridership totalled 1,757 passengers. The bus service also provides daily same-day parcel delivery to all its terminals in the Maritimes. It formerly serviced connections to Quebec; however, this service did not restart after halting during the COVID-19 pandemic.

== Coach Atlantic Group ==
Maritime Bus is a subsidiary of its parent company, Coach Atlantic Group. By 2025, the company employed more than 800 people and operated a fleet of more than 250 vehicles.

== Legal status ==
The application for incorporation was filed on August 16, 2012, and was originally going to be called Atlantic Express Inc. During the incorporation process, the name of the applicant was changed to Tri-Maritime Bus Network Inc.

== See also ==
- Acadian Lines
