= Acadian Lines =

Former Canadian motor coach operator for the Maritime Provinces

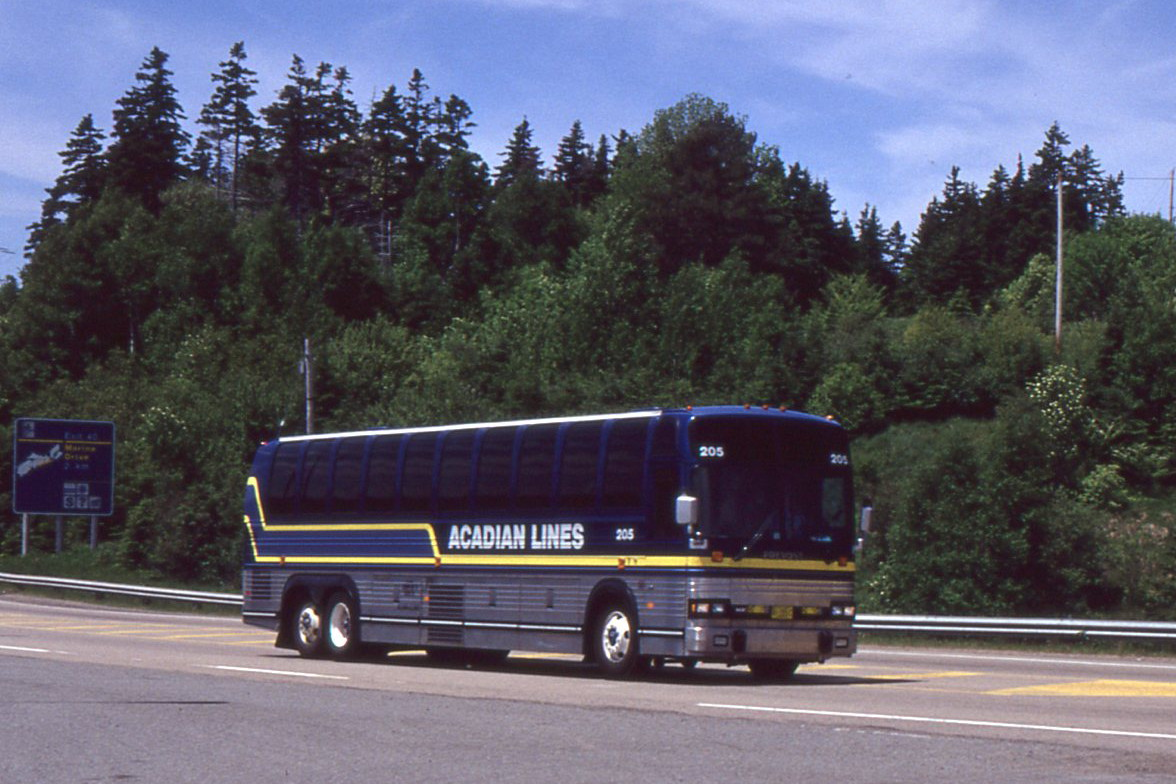
- Parent: Keolis
- Founded: 1 August 1938
- Defunct: 30 November 2012
- Headquarters: 92 Lester Street, Moncton, New Brunswick
- Service area: Eastern Canada
- Service type: Intercity coach service
- Alliance: Orléans Express
- Stops: 92
- Stations: 14
- Fleet: 38

Acadian Lines was a Canadian coach operator based in Moncton, New Brunswick.

== History ==
The company was established in Halifax, Nova Scotia by industrialist (Fred C Manning?) Roy Jodrey on 1 August 1938 as Nova Scotia Coach Lines, a division of United Service Corporation. In 1947, it became known as Acadian Lines and on 28 December 1955, Acadian Lines became a wholly owned company when it was purchased from United Service Corporation by George C. Thompson, Ralph A. Pepper, and Gordon H. Thompson. The company subsequently purchased the bus operations of Fleetlines Limited of Halifax and Highland Lines of Sydney. Acadian Lines operated regular passenger and parcel express services between communities throughout the province.

Acadian Lines was Nova Scotian-owned until December 1995, when the Irving Transportation Group purchased Acadian Lines and merged SMT (Eastern), an Irving subsidiary which operated scheduled and chartered bus services in New Brunswick and Prince Edward Island, with Acadian Lines while maintaining and expanding the Acadian name throughout the Maritimes.

In 2004, Irving Transportation Group sold Acadian Lines to Keolis which brought it under the control of its Orléans Express subsidiary. Orléans Express modified the company logo to include an upside-down "a" for the third "a" (thus becoming Acadiɐn); the legal company name remains spelled "Acadian" for correspondence. Effectively, this made the logo a bilingual ambigram, as the "ɐ" could either stand for "a" (English), or "e" (French).

== Former operations ==
Acadian Lines operated regular bus services between New Brunswick, Prince Edward Island and Nova Scotia as well as Rivière-du-Loup, and Quebec (connecting with Orléans Express).

In 2006, Acadian Lines cancelled bus service on the route between Halifax and Yarmouth due to low ticket sales.

In 2011, Acadian Lines cancelled bus service on the route between Saint John, New Brunswick and Bangor, Maine due to low ticket sales.

From 2 December 2011 until 16 May 2012 the company completely shut down its New Brunswick and Prince Edward Island operations after it locked out 59 drivers with Amalgamated Transit Union Local 1229 over a contract dispute. Although Acadian Lines operations in Nova Scotia continued to function, the lack of service in New Brunswick meant that inter-city bus service from Nova Scotia to central Canada was interrupted during this time.

Service restarted in New Brunswick and Prince Edward Island on 16 May serving a limited route network. Routes north of Moncton, New Brunswick to Campbellton, New Brunswick as well as from Saint John, New Brunswick to Fredericton, New Brunswick were reduced or eliminated. Additional buses on existing routes to Prince Edward Island were eliminated. Acadian Lines ceased operations in all three provinces on 30 November 2012, citing financial losses due to regulatory inflexibility for routes.

== Legal status ==
The company was incorporated as Acadian Coach Lines LP/Autocars Acadien SEC in New Brunswick, Nova Scotia and Prince Edward Island. Additionally, the company has a subsidiary incorporated in the three provinces named Acadian Motor Coach Tours LP/Tours Autocars Acadien SEC.

== See also ==
- Orléans Express
- Maritime Bus
