= Eugène Prévost (carpenter) =

- Born: November 12, 1898; Sainte-Claire, Bellechasse, Chaudière-Appalaches, Quebec, Canada
- Died: February 2, 1965 (aged 66); Sainte-Claire, Bellechasse, Chaudière-Appalaches, Quebec, Canada
- Resting place: Sainte-Claire Cemetery
- Monuments: Maison Prévost; Villa Prévost; Place Eugène Prévost
- Occupations: Cabinet maker Manufacturer of coach buses and motor homes Mayor of Sainte-Claire
- Known for: Founder of Prévost Car

Eugène Prévost (French pronunciation: [øʒɛn pʁevo]; 1898–1965) was a French Canadian carpenter who initially specialized in producing church pews and school furniture. After receiving a commission in 1924 to fabricate, and install a wooden bus shell on a new chassis, his business gradually evolved to one that emphasized the production of coach buses and motor homes. Les Ateliers Prévost was acquired in 1957 and renamed Prévost Car. Eugène Prévost had a lasting impact on the village of his birth; the company he founded is a leader in the industry and remains headquartered in Sainte-Claire.

== Early life ==
Joseph Eugène Prévost, son of Joseph Prévost and Obéline Couture, was born on 12 November 1898 in Sainte-Claire, a village in Bellechasse, Chaudière-Appalaches, Quebec, Canada, formerly in the historic county of Dorchester, about thirty miles south of Quebec City. As his older brothers had emigrated to the United States, settling in Vermont, it was left to Eugène and his younger brother Alphonse to assist their father in finishing the interior of the family home in Sainte Claire. After he left school, he worked as a carpenter, building houses and barns. Prévost purchased a motorcycle in 1918 and developed a reputation as a skilled mechanic. Before his father's death in 1921, Eugène Prévost built a side car in 1919 and attached it to his motorcycle, so that he could transport the elder Prévost to visit those sons residing in Vermont. That side car was to become his first machine roulante. Prévost married Clarisse Leblond, daughter of Alfred Leblond and Léda Fauchon, on 29 May 1922 at the parish church. Upon his return from his honeymoon, he established his first workshop in a shed near the family home. He specialized in the manufacture of church pews and school furniture.

== Founding of Prévost Car ==
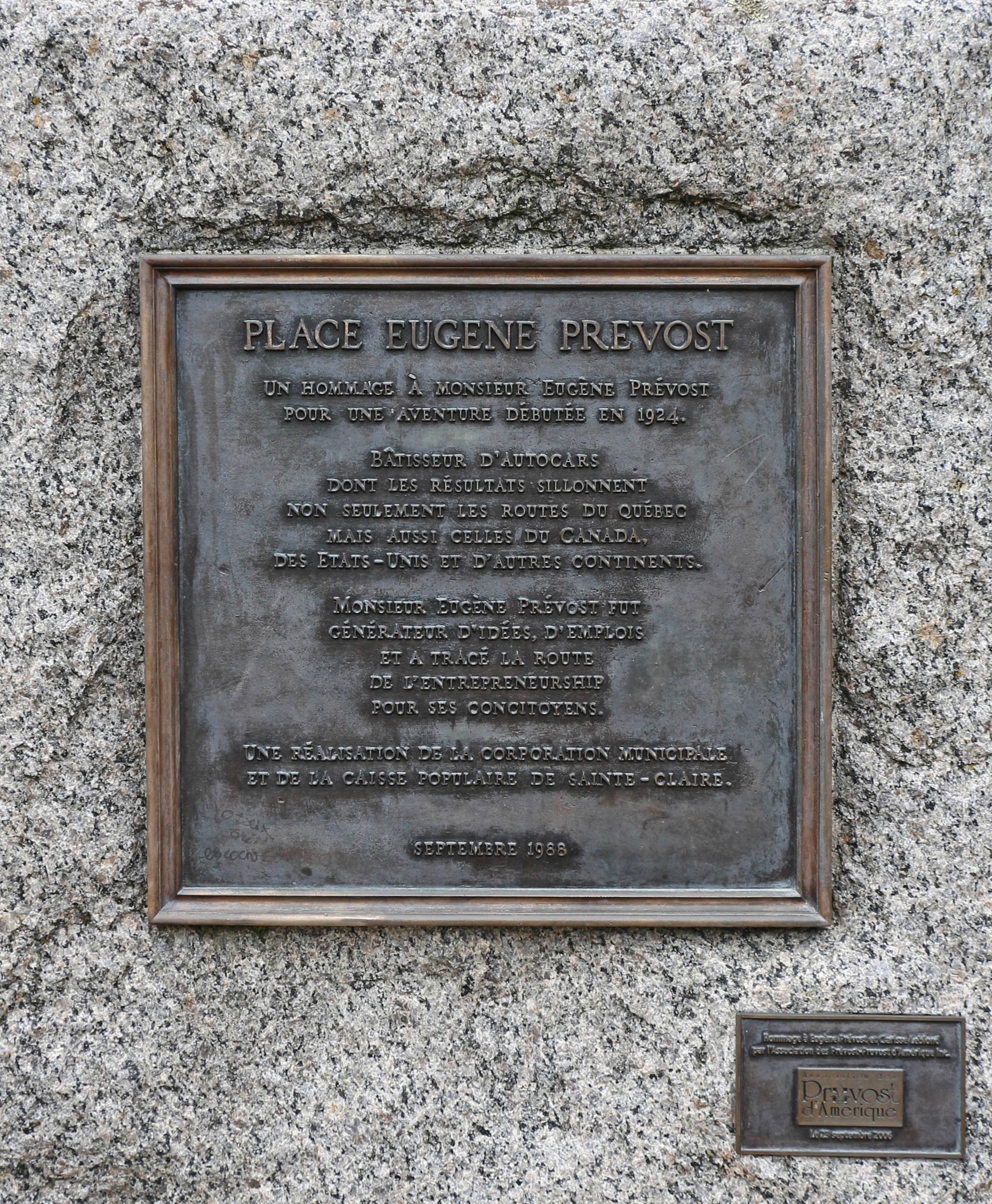
Plaque at Place Eugène Prévost

In 1924, Eugène Prévost received from Georges Roy a commission to produce a wooden bus body and frame and mount it on a new REO truck chassis. For the next decade, he only accepted one or two commissions a year to manufacture buses. Increasing demand for his bus, as well as two fires which destroyed his workshop, one in 1926 and the other in 1937, necessitated the construction of a bus manufacturing facility in Sainte Claire between 1937 and 1939. Prévost changed his bus design from a body and frame which were entirely composed of wood to one with a metal body and a wooden frame. In 1945, he altered his design again, with a body and frame which were both constructed of metal. Prévost also began to phase out his production of furniture to concentrate on motorcoaches. Visits to Detroit to observe manufacturing facilities prompted a shift from handcrafting to a more industrial enterprise, as well as the building of a new factory in 1946. His company, which operated as Les Ateliers Prévost from 1947, received a government commission for one hundred coaches in 1951, the majority of which were for the Department of National Defence. That same year, Prévost decided to begin production of motor homes. However, just a few years later, the bus industry suffered a severe slump and many bus manufacturers in North America went out of business. By 1955, activity at Prévost's enterprise was essentially at a standstill. In 1956, Les Ateliers Prévost manufactured only three coaches. In 1957, the company was acquired by business partners Paul Normand and Evariste Laflamme and renamed Prévost Car Inc. Now owned by Volvo Bus Corporation, Prévost Car produces highway touring buses and is the leader in the manufacture of shells for luxury motor homes and specialty conversions. By 1951, Les Ateliers Prévost provided employment to more than 200 people. In 2014, ninety years after its founding, Prévost Car's headquarters and primary manufacturing facilities remain in Sainte-Claire and the company employs nearly 1200 people.

== Public service and later life ==
Prévost became mayor of Sainte-Claire and warden of its church in 1947, posts which he held for five years and three years, respectively. The mayor acquired the first fire engines for the village. New streets were built under his watch and a planning commission for the village was established. As churchwarden, he constructed a fence which enclosed the church and cemetery of Sainte-Claire. He renovated the church's interior and was also responsible for the illuminated cross at the entrance to the village. Prévost also created the cross at the center of Sainte-Claire Cemetery which marks the grave of Father Joseph Honoré Fréchette, who served as pastor of Sainte-Claire from 1903 until his death in 1939.

Eugène Prévost suffered paralysis about 1955, and increasingly required the assistance of his two youngest sons. He died on 2 February 1965 at age 66, and was interred in the parish cemetery of Sainte-Claire.

== Commemoration ==
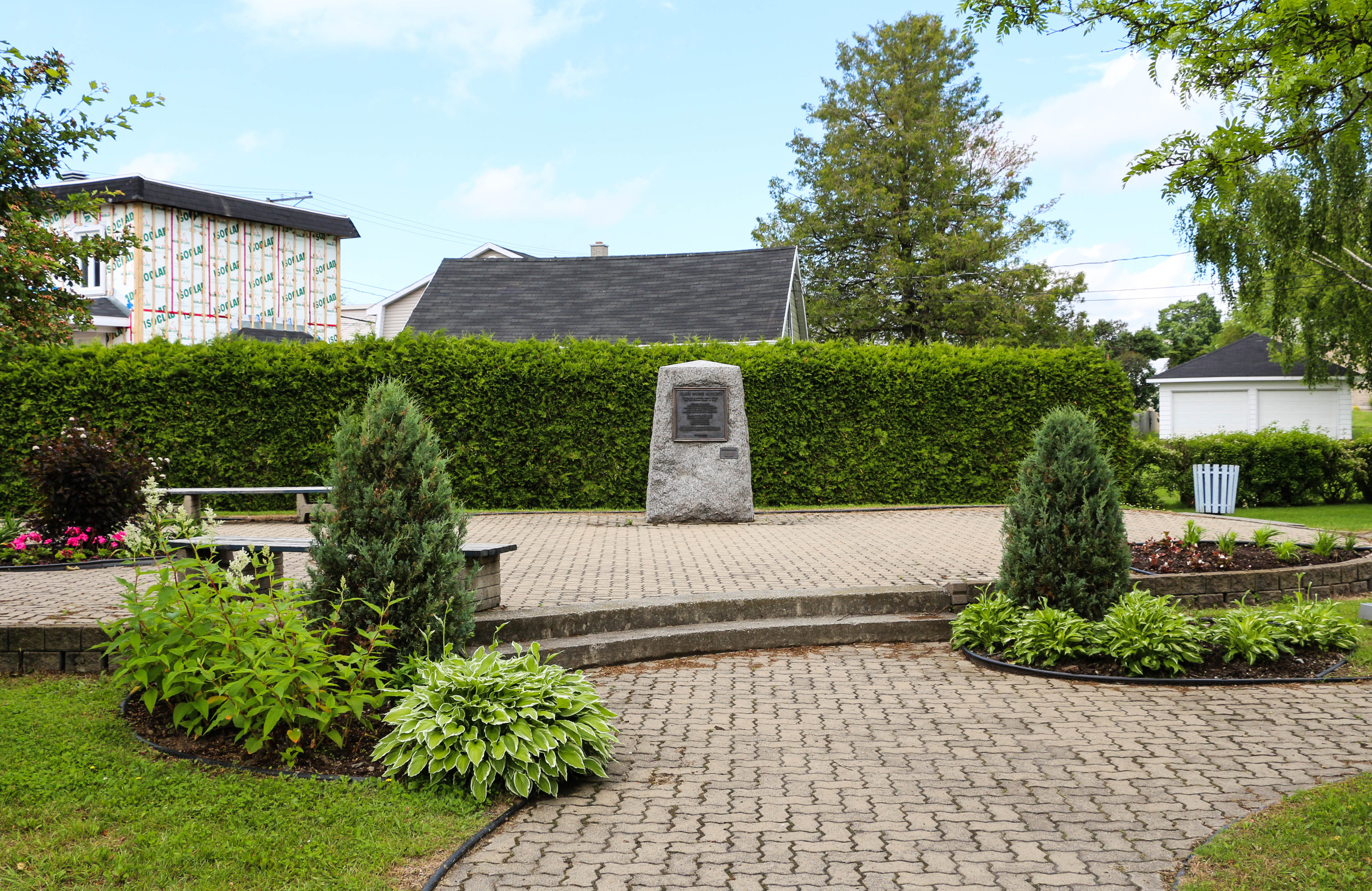
Place Eugène Prévost in Sainte-Claire

Maison Prévost, the residence for the Prévost family, was designed by architect Joseph Gosselin (1847 – 1924) and is a heritage building which was listed by the Government of Quebec in 2009. The Heritage Society of Sainte-Claire acquired a 1952 Prévost Citadin bus in 2001, and spent the next three years restoring the vehicle. The society also sponsored an exhibition which featured the accomplishments of Eugène Prévost. Other tributes to Prévost include Villa Prévost and Place Eugène Prévost. The former is a retirement facility built in Sainte-Claire in 1970. The latter is a park near Sainte-Claire Church which was dedicated to Prévost in 1988. The bronze, commemorative plaque on a monument in the park bears an inscription which honors Prévost:

Place Eugène Prévost. Un hommage à Monsieur Eugène Prévost pour une aventure débutée en 1924. Bâtisseur d'autocars dont les résultats sillonnent non seulement les routes du Québec mais aussi celles du Canada, des Etats-Unis et d'autres continents. Monsieur Eugène Prévost fut générateur d'idées, d'emplois et a tracé la route de l'entrepreneurship pour ses concitoyens. Une réalisation de la corporation municipale et de la caisse populaire de Sainte-Claire. Septembre 1988
