= Prevost X-Series =

Prevost X3-45
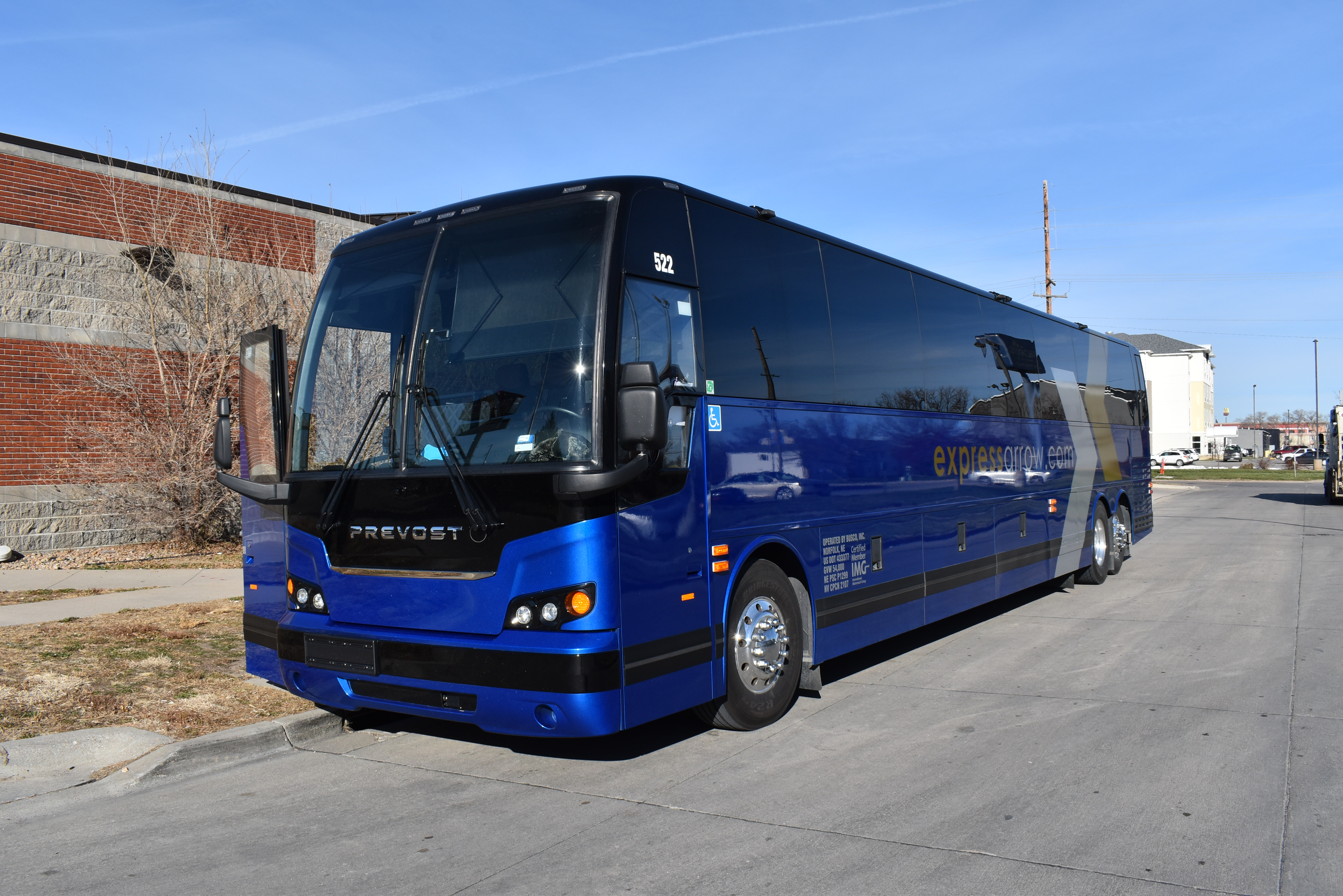
- Prevost X3-45 (second generation), showing design updates from 2019

Overview
- Manufacturer: Prevost
- Model years: 2006–present

Powertrain
- Engine: Volvo D13, 12.8 L (780 cu in)
- Transmission: Allison "World"

Dimensions
- Wheelbase: 8,496 mm (334.5 in)
- Length: 13,716 mm (45 ft)
- Width: 2,578 mm (101.5 in)
- Height: 3,400 mm (133.875 in)

The Prevost X-Series is a family of motorcoaches and conversion shells designed and manufactured by Prevost, a subsidiary of Volvo Buses. The current model is the X3-45, which is a (nominal) 45-foot, 3-axle bus for the intercity bus and Class A conversion motorhome markets.

The ancestors of the X-Series can be traced back to 1984, when Prevost released the widebody XL Series of motorcoaches, including the LeMirage XL. A 45-foot model was added in 1992 as the XL-45, which was updated with a second generation in 2000 as the LeMirage XL-II. The third generation bus was released in 2006 as the X3-45, which competes with the MCI D-Series.

== Design ==
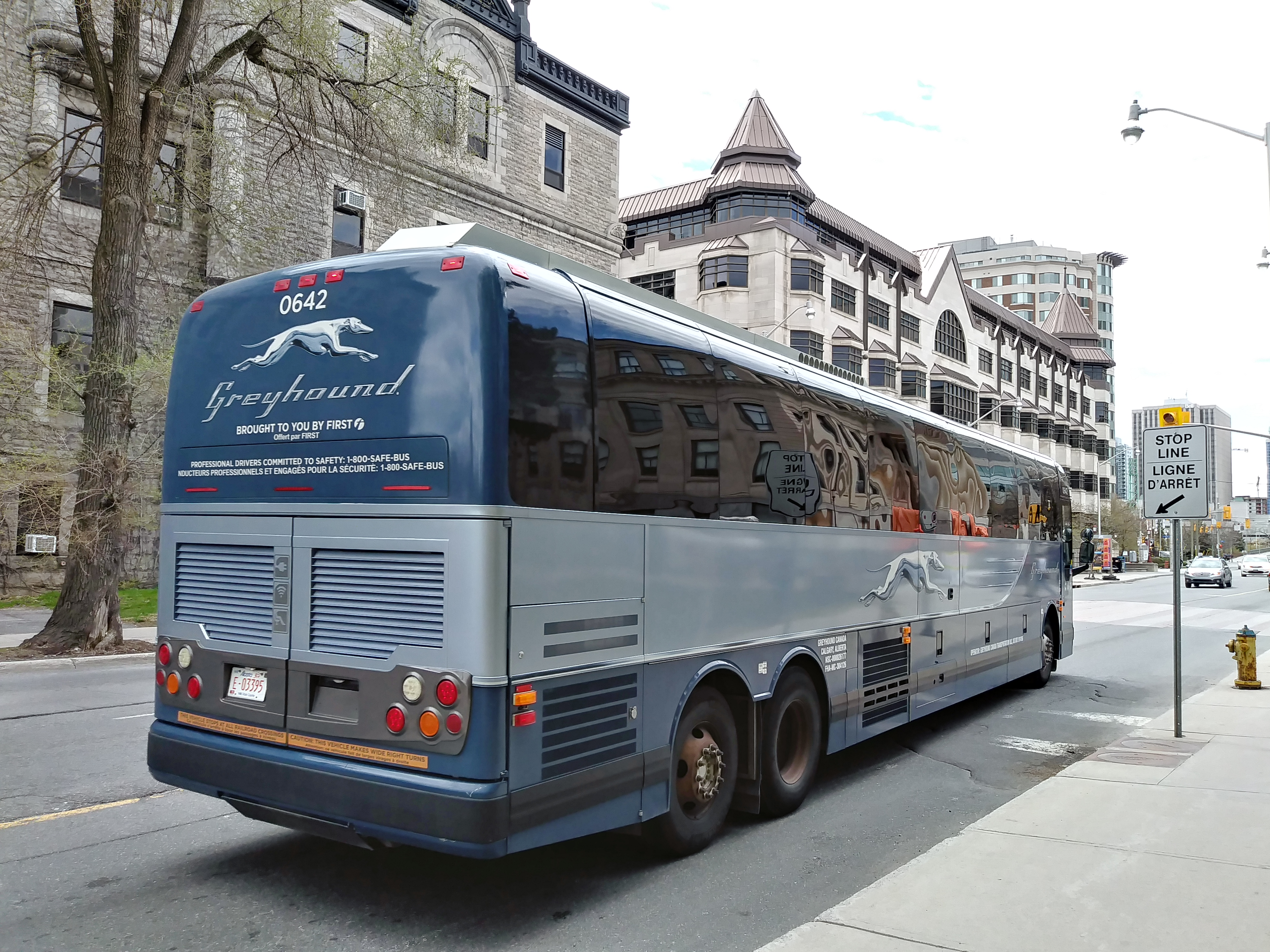
X3-45 (rear, first generation)

The X3-45 has a wheelbase of 334.5 in (8.50 m), with an overall length of 45 ft (13.72 m), width of 101.5 in (2.58 m), and height of 133.875 in (3.40 m). The standard engine is a Volvo D13 diesel engine, coupled to an Allison "World Bus" 6-speed automatic transmission.

The X3-45 was updated in 2011 to add a transit bus model, and the styling and chassis were updated in 2019. The most prominent visual changes can be seen around the headlights.

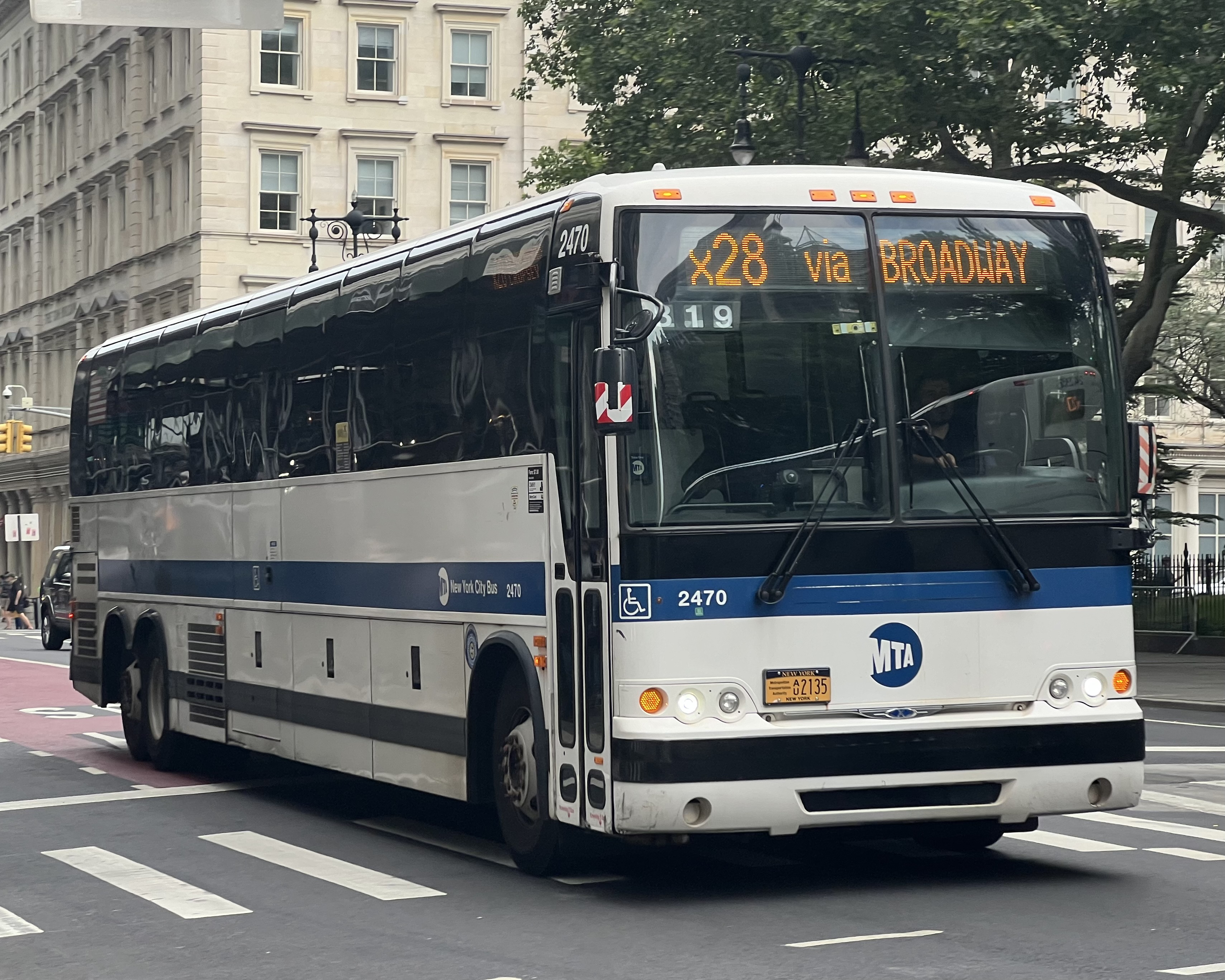
First-generation X3-45 Commuter, in service with MTA Regional Bus Operations

Three models are available:

- X3-45 (long-distance motorcoach)
- X3-45 Commuter (transit bus)
- X3-45 VIP Specialty / VIP Entertainer (conversion shells)

VIP models are conversion shells with minimal interiors which are sold to upfitters for completion. For the passenger models fitted with seats by Prevost, including the X3-45 and X3-45 Commuter, the passenger deck features an interior height of 79.5–80 in (2.02–2.03 m), and there is 380–406 cu ft (10.8–11.5 m^{3}) of storage under the passenger floor.

Prevost X-Series key statistics
Vehicle Stat.	XL Series		XLII Series		X3-45	
Vehicle Stat.	XL-40	XL-45	XLII-40	XLII-45	(2006)	(2019)
Generation	1		2		3	3a
Length (nom.)	40 ft (12.2 m)	45 ft (13.7 m)	40 ft (12.2 m)	45 ft (13.7 m)	45 ft (13.7 m)	
Wheelbase (Note: Wheelbase is measured from the front axle to the drive axle, which is the forward axle of the rear tandem set. The drive axle has dual wheels on each side, while the tag axle has a single wheel.)	280 in (7.11 m)	315 in (8.00 m)	279 in (7.09 m)	317 in (8.05 m)	334.5 in (8.50 m)	
Overhang F/R	69 / 77.5 in (1,753 / 1,968 mm)	69 / 102.5 in (1,753 / 2,604 mm)	70 3/4 / 82 1/2 in (1,797 / 2,096 mm)	70 3/4 / 107 1/2 in (1,797 / 2,730 mm)	72 / 90.5 in (1,829 / 2,299 mm)	71.2 / 86.6 in (1,808 / 2,200 mm)
Dry weight	29,350 lb (13,313 kg)	30,850 lb (13,993 kg)	—N/a	37,090 lb (16,820 kg)	38,590 lb (17,500 kg)	37,100 lb (16,800 kg)
GVWR	42,690 lb (19,364 kg)	46,800 lb (21,228 kg)	48,900 lb (22,181 kg)		48,900 lb (22,200 kg)	53,000 lb (24,000 kg)

Notes

Overall fuel consumption, as observed over a standardized driving route incorporating typical transit service routes serving downtown, arterial, and commuter areas, was 3.77 mpg_{‑US} (62.4 l/100 km).

== History ==
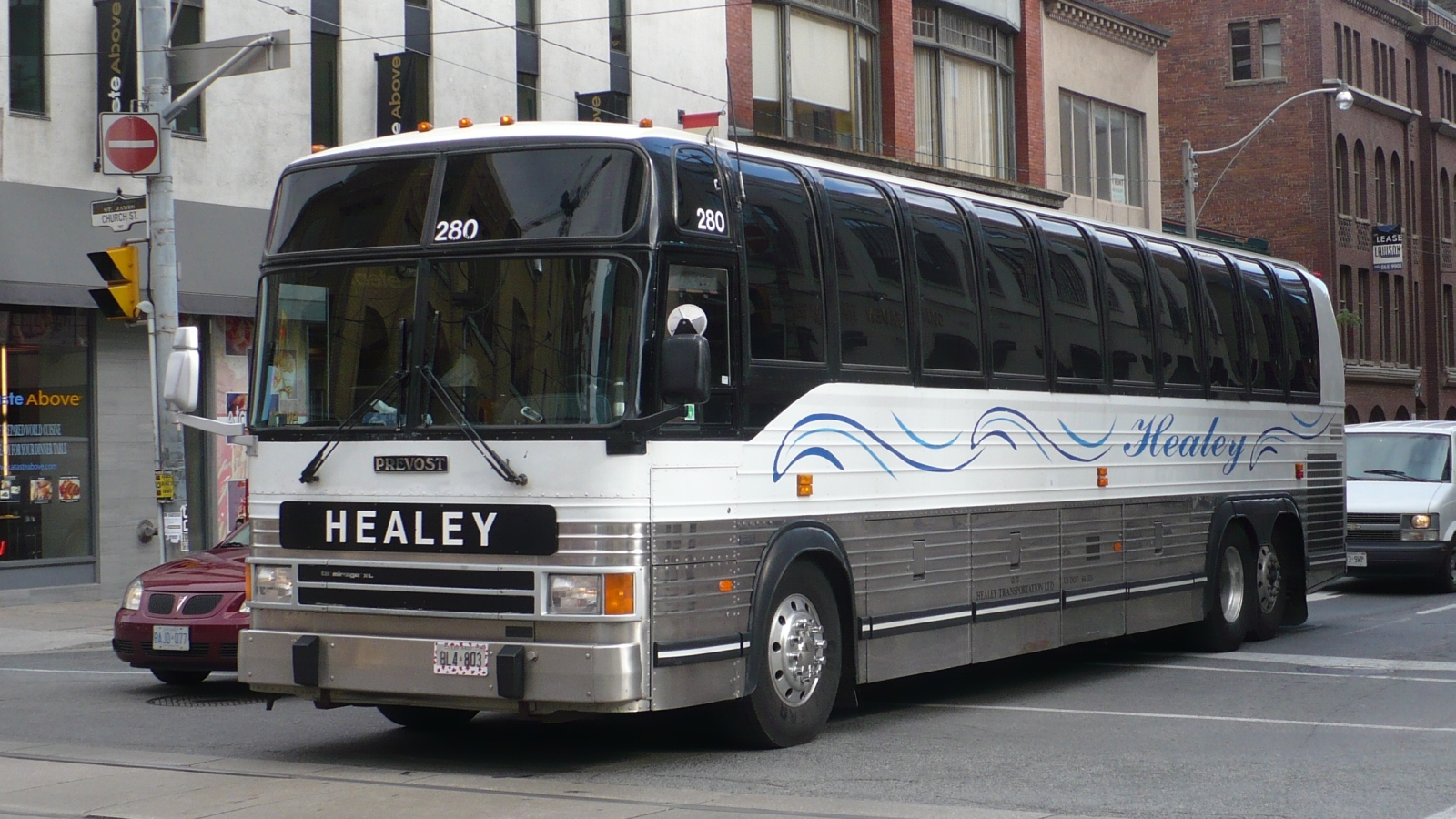
Prevost LeMirage XL (Healey Transportation)

Prevost introduced the LeMirage in 1976 to replace its earlier Champion and Prestige series of motorcoaches; although the Champion had been marketed in the United States since 1968, the LeMirage gave Prevost its first substantial American sales, as it eliminated the "stepped" front with a four-piece windshield and retained the tall, curved side windows from the Prestige, resulting in a brighter interior for passengers than its competitors. A wide-body version, the LeMirage XL, followed in 1984, increasing the nominal width from 96 to 102 in (2,400 to 2,600 mm). Prevost also introduced two sister models in 1984, grouping all three motorcoaches as the XL Series: Marathon XL, a stripped-down variant designed to be more economical than the LeMirage XL, and Astral XL, a premium variant with glass roof panels above the passengers, aimed at sightseeing bus tour operators. All three of the XL Series buses introduced in 1984 have a nominal length of 40 ft (12.2 m).

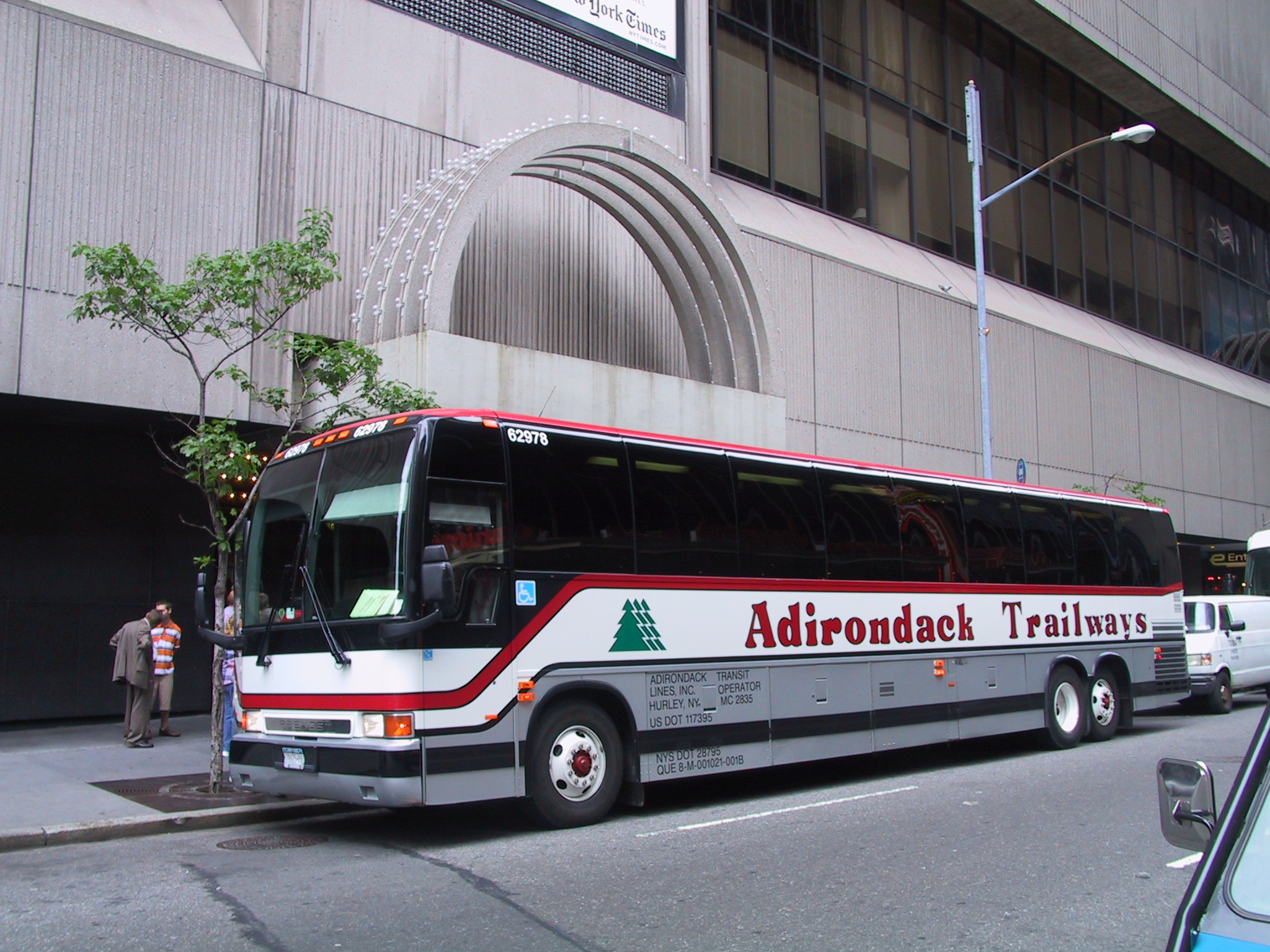
Prevost LeMirage XLII-45 (Adirondack Trailways)

An extended version, designated XL-45, was added in 1992, with a nominal length of 45 ft (13.7 m). The XL-45 was introduced in part to compete with the MCI D-Series. The second generation XLII series buses introduced in 2000 included both XLII-40 and XLII-45 models, with nominal lengths of 40- and 45-feet, respectively. XLII models can be distinguished externally from their XL predecessors, as the XLII have removed the fluted stainless steel lower body cladding and the side windows are set with flush glazing.

The New York Metropolitan Transportation Authority awarded a contract to Prevost for up to 330 X3-45 Commuter buses in 2019, with the buses to be assembled at the Volvo Buses factory in Plattsburgh, New York, which it shares with Nova Bus. Prevost production at Plattsburgh concluded by the end of 2022, returning to its home factory in Quebec.
