= Sainte-Claire =

- Municipality
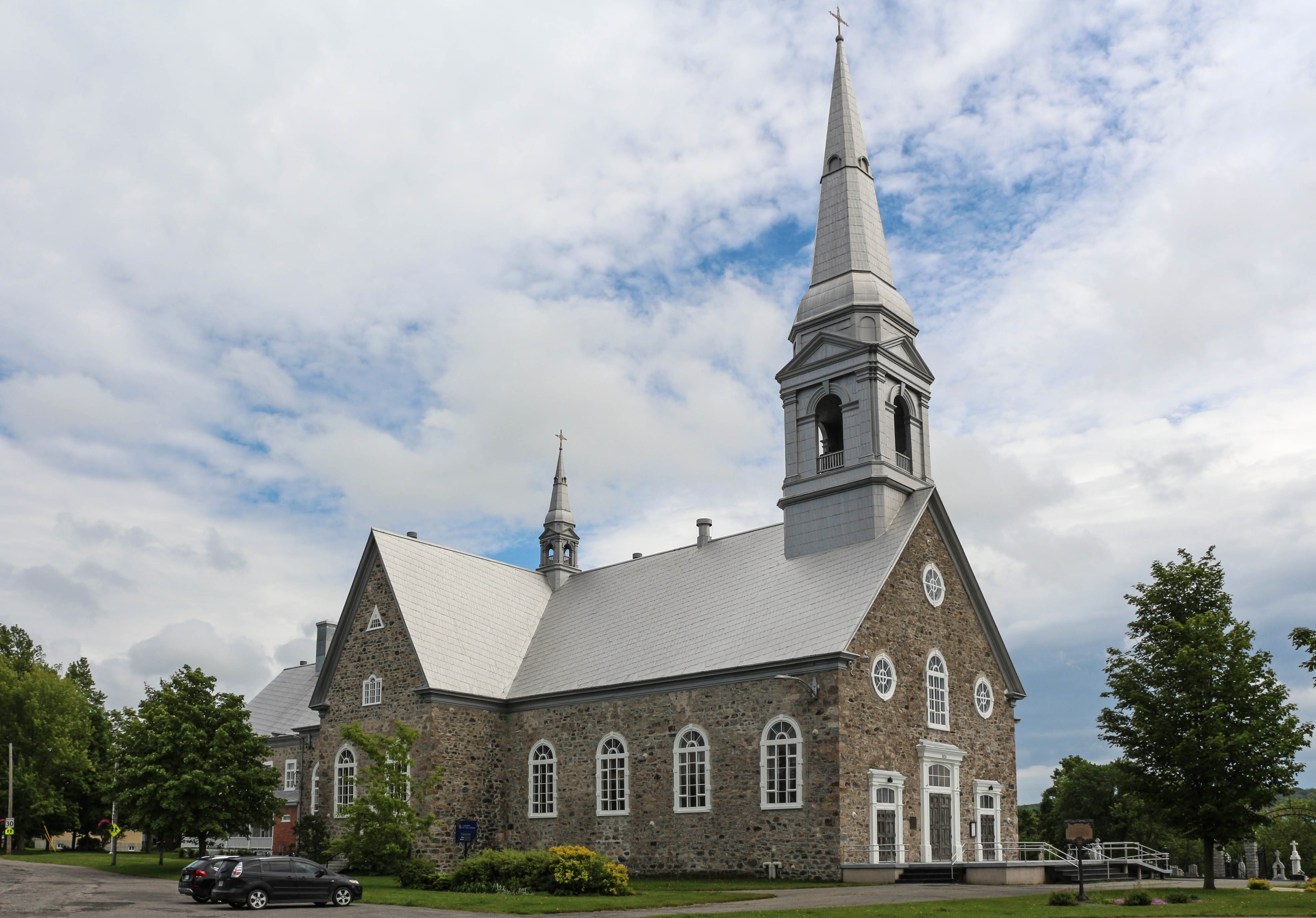

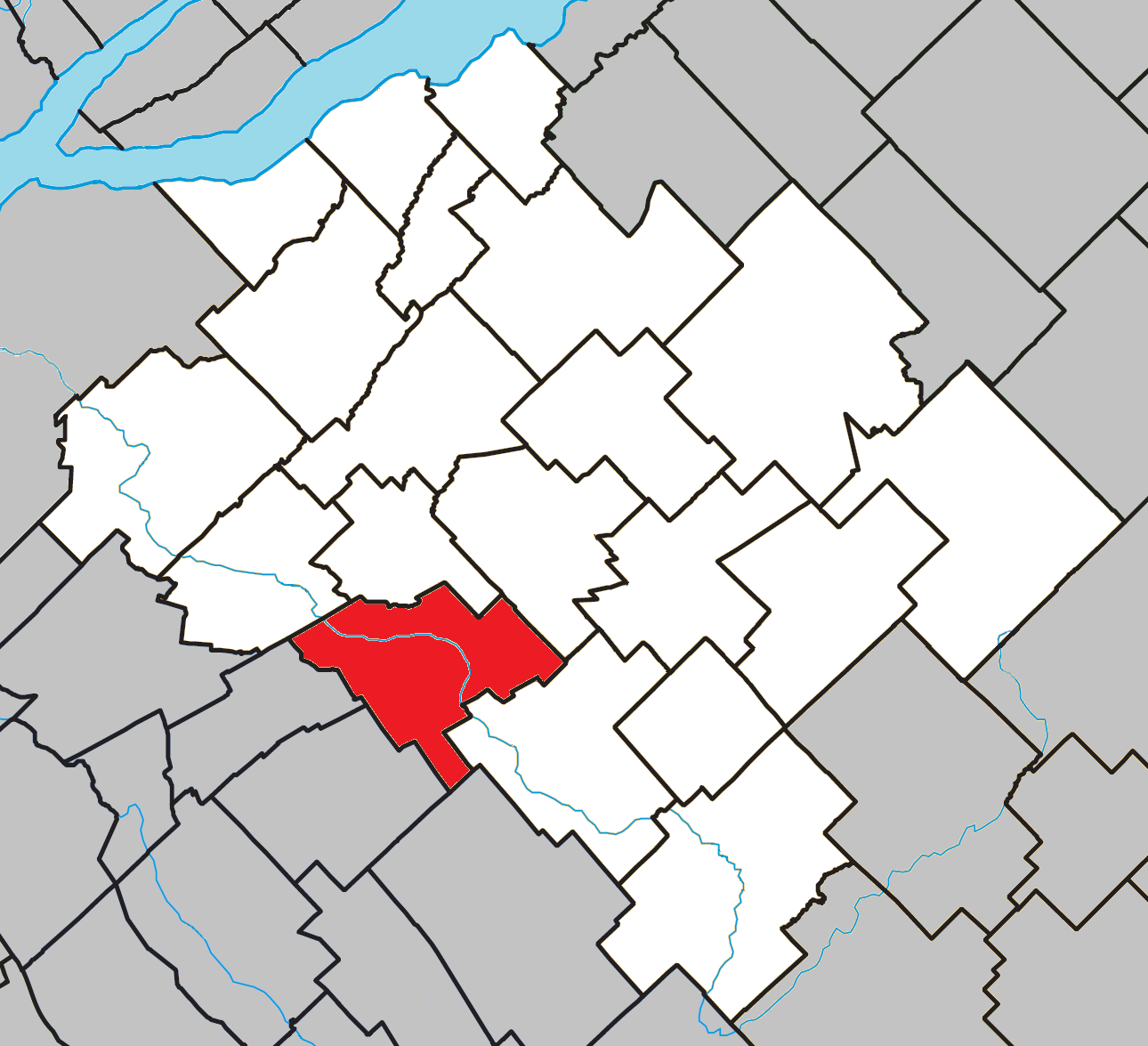
- Location within Bellechasse RCM

- Location in province of Quebec
- Coordinates: 46°36′N 70°52′W
- Country: Canada
- Province: Quebec
- Region: Chaudière-Appalaches
- RCM: Bellechasse
- Constituted: October 1, 1977

Government
  - Mayor: Guylaine Aubin
  - Federal riding: Bellechasse—Les Etchemins—Lévis
  - Prov. riding: Bellechasse

Area
  - Total: 89.35 km^{2} (34.50 sq mi)
  - Land: 88.14 km^{2} (34.03 sq mi)

Population (2021)
  - Total: 3,526
  - Density: 40/km^{2} (100/sq mi)
  - Pop 2016–2021: ▲4.9%
  - Private dwellings: 1,704
- Time zone: UTC−5 (EST)
  - Summer (DST): UTC−4 (EDT)
- Postal code: G0R 2V0
- Area codes: 418 and 581
- Highways: R-277
- Website: ste-claire.ca

Sainte-Claire (French pronunciation: [sɛ̃t klɛʁ]) is a municipality in the Bellechasse Regional County Municipality, in the Chaudière-Appalaches region of Quebec, Canada. Located along Route 277 on the south shore of the St. Lawrence River southeast of Quebec City, it had a population of 3,526 in the 2021 Canadian census. The municipality traces its origins to the parish of Sainte-Claire, erected in 1824 on land formerly granted to Louis Jolliet, and took its present form in 1977 through the merger of Sainte-Claire and Louis-Jolliet. Sainte-Claire is one of the principal industrial centres in Bellechasse and is the headquarters of the motorcoach manufacturer Prévost.

== History ==
The territory of present-day Sainte-Claire formed part of the seigneury granted to Louis Jolliet in 1697. The place name is associated with Claire-Françoise Bissot, Jolliet's wife. According to the Commission de toponymie du Québec, the first settlers were present by 1785, and the locality developed around the future parish of Sainte-Claire.

The parish of Sainte-Claire was canonically erected on April 14, 1824, and letters patent approving the erection were issued later that year under the government of Sir Francis Burton. A commemorative heritage plaque recorded by the Répertoire du patrimoine culturel du Québec states that Sainte-Claire was the first Roman Catholic parish in Lower Canada to be erected both canonically and civilly under British rule.

Municipal organization changed several times during the 19th and 20th centuries. The parish municipality of Sainte-Claire-de-Joliette was established in 1845, abolished in 1847, and re-established in 1855 as the parish municipality of Sainte-Claire. In 1926, the territory was divided between the municipalities of Sainte-Claire and Louis-Jolliet. The present municipality was constituted on October 1, 1977, through the merger of those two municipalities.

== Geography ==
Sainte-Claire is located in eastern Bellechasse, along Route 277, about 30 km from Autoroute 20 and 25 km from Autoroute 73. The Etchemin River and the Abénaquis River cross the municipal territory. The municipality has a total area of 89.35 km^{2} and a land area of 88.14 km^{2}.

== Demographics ==
In the 2021 census, Sainte-Claire had a population of 3,526 living in 1,583 of its 1,704 total private dwellings, compared with a population of 3,362 in 2016. The municipality's population density was 40.0 inhabitants per square kilometre in 2021.

=== Population trend ===
Census year	Population	Change (%)
2006	3,097	—
2011	3,325	+7.4
2016	3,362	+1.1
2021	3,526	+4.9

=== Language and households ===
Statistics Canada reported 1,585 households in Sainte-Claire in 2021, with a homeownership rate of 71.0%, down 4.2 percentage points from 2016. The median after-tax income of households was $62,400 in 2020, up from $56,400 in 2015.

French is overwhelmingly the dominant mother tongue. In 2021, 3,440 residents reported French only as their mother tongue, compared with 20 reporting English only, 45 reporting a single non-official language, and 20 reporting multiple mother tongues.

== Economy ==
Sainte-Claire has a diversified manufacturing base centred on its industrial park and adjoining industrial zones. The municipality states that about 2,000 employees commute into Sainte-Claire each day to work in local industries. Its industrial directory lists firms in agri-food, food processing, plastics, maple equipment, machining, automation, and transport manufacturing.

The municipality is best known economically as the headquarters of Prévost. The company identifies its headquarters at 35 boulevard Gagnon in Sainte-Claire, and its corporate history traces its origins in the community to Eugène Prévost's woodworking business in 1919 and the firm's entry into coach-body manufacturing in 1924.

Commuting is dominated by private vehicles. According to Statistics Canada, 87.4% of the employed labour force in Sainte-Claire commuted by driving a car, truck, or van in 2021, while 7.5% used active or other sustainable transportation.

== Heritage ==
The principal historic building in Sainte-Claire is the Church of Sainte-Claire. According to the Répertoire du patrimoine culturel du Québec, it was built between 1825 and 1827 by the contractor François Audet, from plans prepared by the architect Thomas Baillairgé and the abbé Jérôme Demers. The same source describes the building as a Latin-cross church with a projecting choir, a flat apse, and a sacristy aligned with the main axis.
