= Prevost (bus manufacturer) =

Bus and coach manufacturer

- Type: Subsidiary
- Industry: Manufacturing
- Founded: 1924
- Headquarters: Sainte-Claire, Quebec, Canada
- Key people: François Tremblay (president)
- Products: Coaches; RV (Conversion Shells)
- Parent: Volvo Buses (1995–present)
- Website: prevostcar.com

Prevost (/ˈpreɪvoʊ/, French pronunciation: [pʁevo]), formally known as Prevost Car, is a Canadian manufacturer of touring coaches and bus shells for high-end motorhomes and specialty conversions. The company is a subsidiary of the Volvo Buses division of the Volvo Group.

== History ==
=== Early years (1924–1951) ===
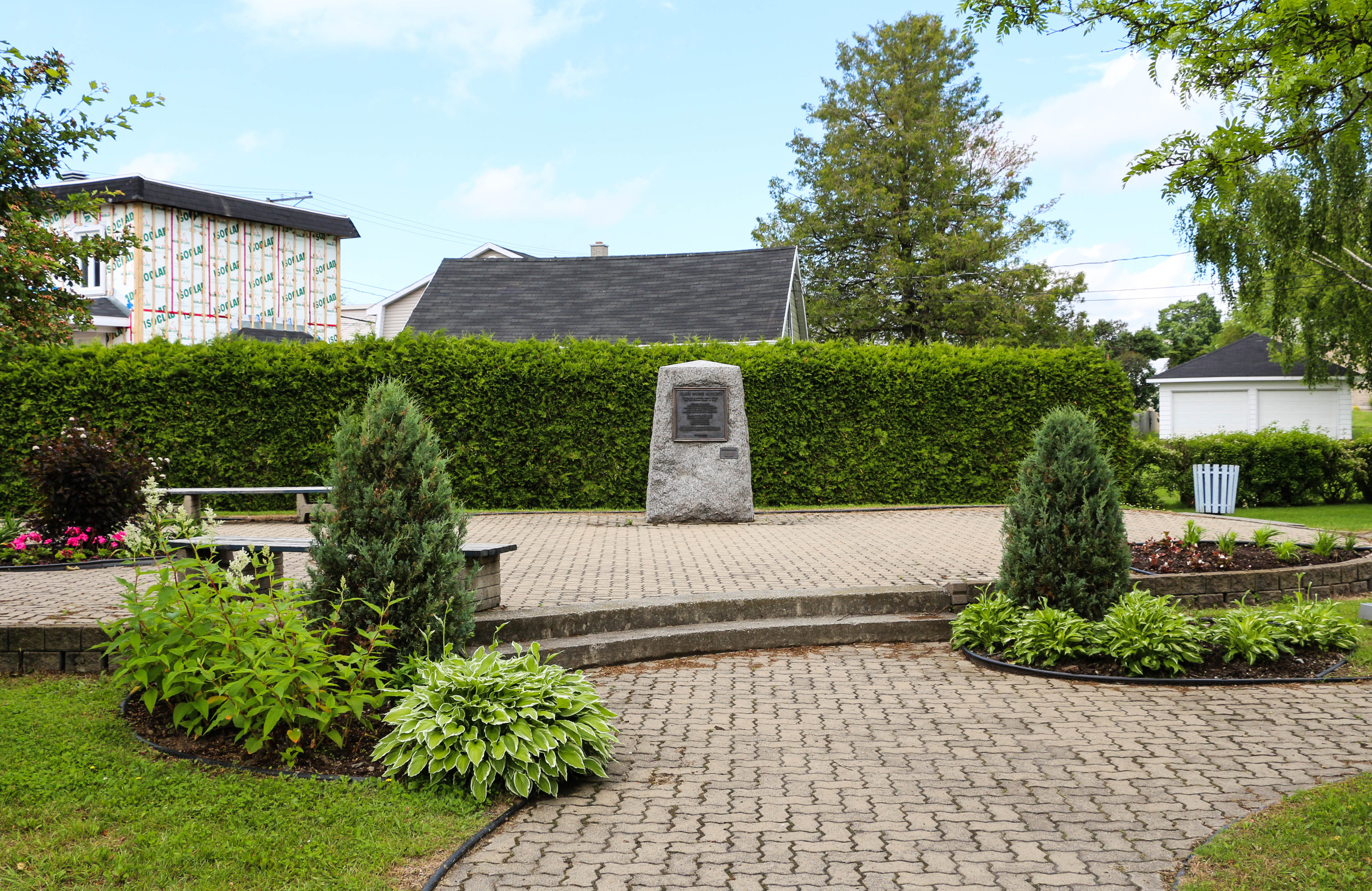
Place Eugène Prévost in Sainte-Claire

Prevost Car was founded by Eugène Prévost (1898–1965), a cabinet maker specializing in church pews and school furniture; in 1924 he was asked to build a custom bus body for a new REO truck chassis. Prévost's company received several repeat orders, but Prévost limited production to one bus body per winter. Between 1937 and 1939, its first dedicated bus manufacturing plant was built in Sainte-Claire, Quebec, with a capacity of ten vehicle bodies per year. At the time, Prevost buses were sold mainly to operators in eastern Canada. Initially the vehicles were built with metal panels over a wooden frame. In 1945 this changed, and body panels and frames were made of metal.

In 1943, the company was awarded a large contract to build buses for the Defence Ministry of Canada. After the war, the company resumed commercial sales in 1948 as Les Ateliers Prévost, and established vertically integrated manufacturing facilities with a foundry, die-casting, plating, and other metal and woodworking shops for bus fabrication; it was awarded another large contract for 100 motorcoaches from the government of Canada in 1951; for the commercial intercity coach market, the company marketed the Interurbain and Prévocar in four different sizes. At about the same time, Prevost also was building city transit buses, marketed as the Citadin. Eugène Prévost served as the president from its founding in 1924 until 1957; production exceeded 100 vehicles per year in 1949, 1950, and 1952, making it the largest Canadian builder of intercity coaches; however, production crashed to just three buses in 1956.

=== Normand era (1957–1995) ===
The company was acquired by Paul Normand in 1957, who renamed the company to Prevost Car. Prevost dealerships were opened in America and Canada starting in 1967. Normand served as president until 1968, when he was succeeded by André Normand, who served as president until 1995. In 1969, two American businessmen, Thomas B. Harbison and William G. Campbell, formed a partnership with André Normand and the three jointly become the company's owners. These three men, in turn, sold Prevost to Volvo Bus Corporation and Henlys Group in 1995.

Under the Normands, Prevost Car introduced the LeNormand in 1957, an intercity coach with modern features including stainless steel side panels, pneumatic suspension, and a diesel engine. In 1961, Prevost Car introduced the Travelair, a 25-foot gas and diesel-powered passenger coach for short trips, and replaced the LeNormand in 1962 with the Panoramique, a 40-foot intercity coach which served Grey Goose Bus Lines. This was succeeded by the Champion (1966), which had an integrated frame and competed with the GM Buffalo bus. The Champion was the first Prevost bus to be marketed in the United States; Somerset Bus Company was the first US operator. A transit bus version of the Panoramique was developed and sold with a dedicated body featuring a rear door, but this version was discontinued in 1968 when the company shifted to market exclusively motorcoaches. An upgraded version of the Champion was introduced in 1968 with taller side windows, rounded at the top, and this model was renamed Le Prestige in 1973. For the Class A motorhome market, Prevost began selling Champion conversion shells to upfitters starting in 1970.

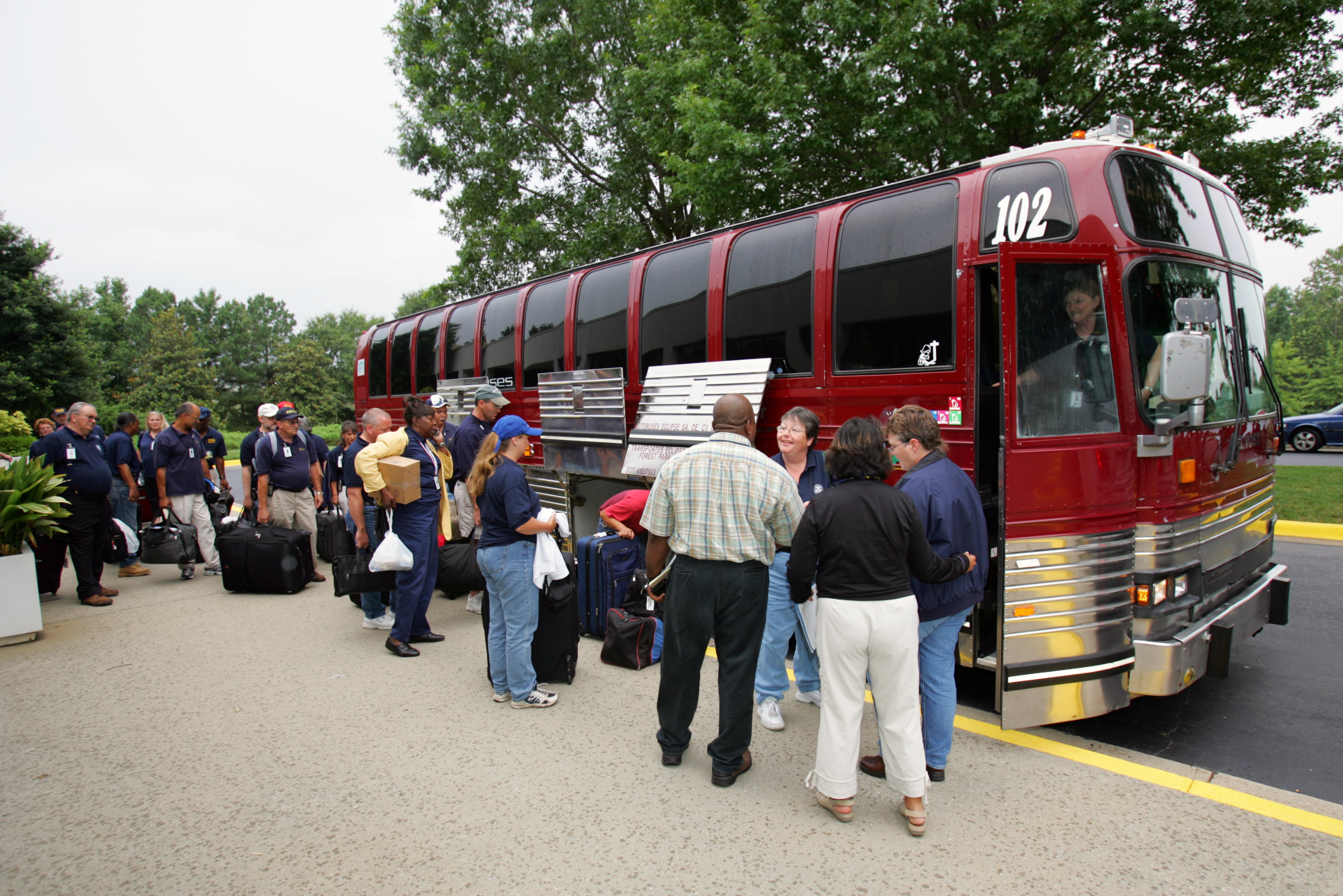
LeMirage with "panoramic" curved side windows

The Champion/Prestige line was succeeded by the LeMirage in 1977, which also were sold as conversion shells starting in 1978. Instead of the step-up front fitted to the Champion/Prestige, the Mirage had a full-front, four-piece windshield. Le Prestige production stopped in 1981. After expanding the factory in 1980, wide-body versions, at the contemporary North American coach standard width of 102 in (2,600 mm), were introduced as the XL Series in 1984, including the LeMirage XL, Marathon XL, and Astral XL; the Marathon XL was marketed as an economical model for intercity routes, while the Astral XL was marketed to tour bus operators, with glass roof panels. A long-wheelbase XL was introduced in 1992 with a nominal 45-foot length, the XL-45 Entertainer, and a similar premium touring coach was introduced in 1994, the LeMirage XL-45.

One year after the XL buses debuted, in 1985, Prevost introduced the H5-60, an articulated bus, at the annual meeting of the American Bus Association; this was the first model in what would become the H-Series. The H5-60 has five axles and major operators included Orléans Express and Holland America Lines–Westours. Starting in 1989, Prevost added rigid body models, including the H3-40 (1989), later updated as the H3-41 (1994), and the H3-45 (1994).

=== Volvo era (1996–present) ===
Georges Bourelle served as the president from 1996 to 2003. Volvo assumed sole ownership of Prevost in 2004, and Gaétan Bolduc took over as president until 2015. He was succeeded by François Tremblay, who has been president of Prevost since 2016.

The LeMirage XL-II began production in January 2000. For 2006, the XL-II was revised to become the X3-45, which featured a longer wheelbase than its predecessor. Beginning in 2011, the Prevost X3-45 was made available in a transit-style configuration as a commuter coach. The New York City Transit Authority was the launch customer for this configuration. Previously, 20 transit-style buses of the Le Mirage predecessor model had been built for GO Transit in the late 1990s. In 2019, the X3-45 was redesigned, getting a new headlight setup and a new rear end. It continues to be available in intercity and transit configurations.

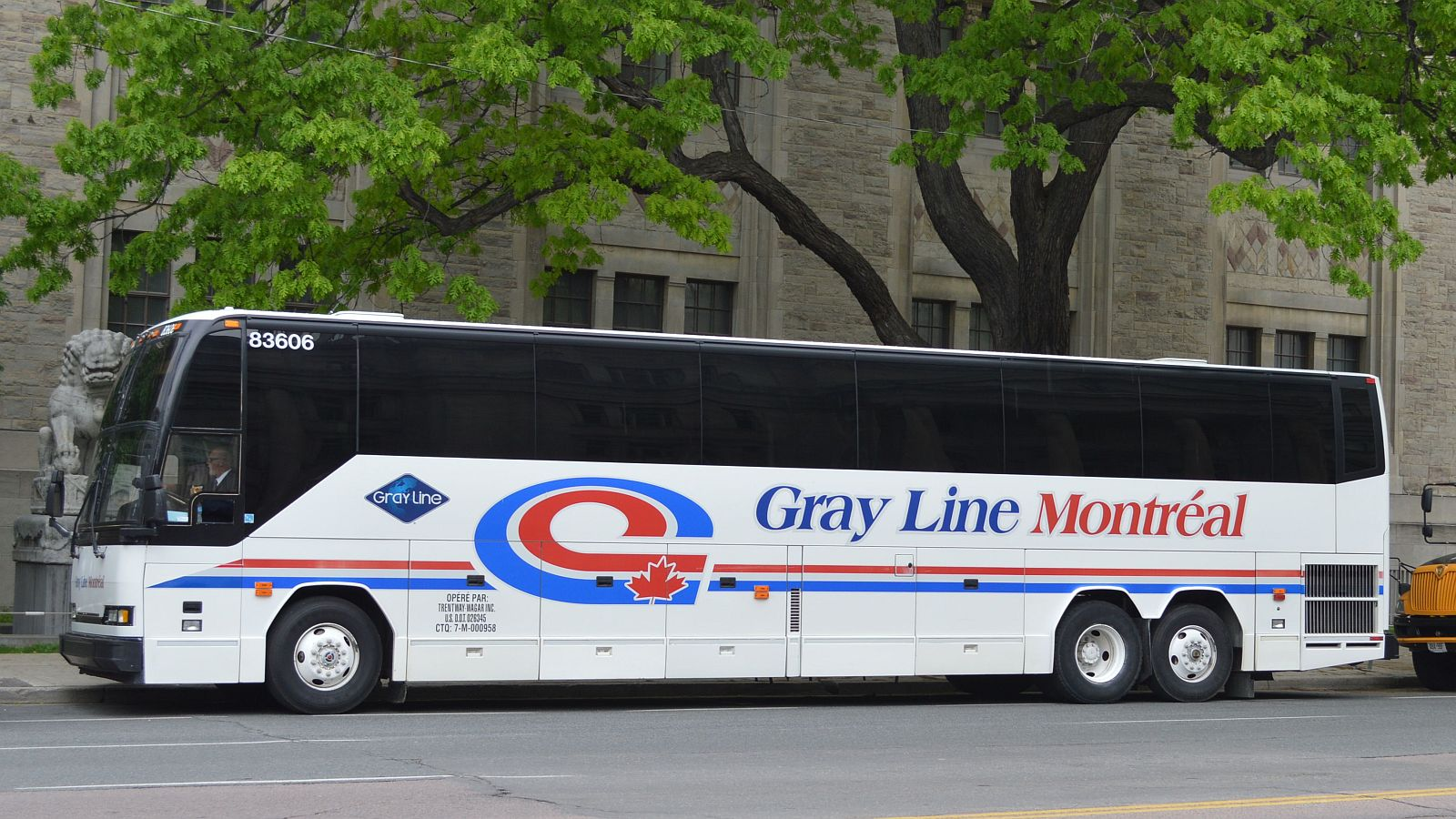
First generation H3-45 (2013), serving Gray Line Montreal

The H-Series was facelifted in 2002 and again in 2009. The H-Series received a new sound system, plus GPS and destination sign options. For the 2024 model year, the H3-45 was redesigned with a new front end and interior facelift.

For the 2008 model year, Prevost introduced the Volvo D13 engine from their parent company as a replacement for the then-current Detroit Diesel Series 60 offering. The Volvo I-Shift semi-automatic transmission was introduced as an alternative to the Allison B500R transmission. A set of new interior color schemes was also introduced.

In 2009, Prevost began distributing the Volvo 9700 coach in Canada and the United States.

As of June 2019, Prevost operates 15 parts and service centers in North America, nine of them in the United States.

== Models ==
=== Current ===
Current motorcoaches sold by Prevost
Photo	Model	Production	Length(s)	Configuration(s)	Notes
H3-45 (3rd Generation)	H-Series	1985–present		Intercity Coach	Also available as a conversion shell. 147 H5-60s were completed.
H3-45 (3rd Generation)	H-Series	H3-40 (1989–1994)	40-ft	Intercity Coach	Also available as a conversion shell. 147 H5-60s were completed.
H3-45 (3rd Generation)	H-Series	H3-41 (1994–unknown)	41-ft	Intercity Coach	Also available as a conversion shell. 147 H5-60s were completed.
H3-45 (3rd Generation)	H-Series	H3-45 (1994–present)	45-ft	Intercity Coach	Also available as a conversion shell. 147 H5-60s were completed.
H3-45 (3rd Generation)	H-Series	H5-60 (1985–1992)	60-ft (artic)	Intercity Coach	Also available as a conversion shell. 147 H5-60s were completed.
X3-45 (2nd Generation)	X3-45	2005–present	45 feet	Intercity Coach Transit Coach	2nd generation model introduced in 2019; Also available as a conversion shell
Volvo 9700 (North American Model)	Volvo 9700	2009–present	45 feet	Intercity Coach	Assembled in Mexico by Volvo

=== Former ===
Former motorcoaches sold by Prevost
Photo	Model	Production	Length(s)	Configuration(s)	Notes
LeMirage XL-II	LeMirage	1976–2005	40- and 45-ft	Intercity coach	Replaced by X3-45
	Champion	1967–1981	40-foot	Intercity coach	41 to 50 passengers
	Marathon	?	?	Intercity coach	47 to 53 passengers
	Prestige	1968–1981	40-foot	Sightseeing intercity coach	41 to 50 passengers
	Panoramique	1962–1966?	?	Intercity coach	41 to 49 passengers
	V48-S	1965–?	?	Motorcoach	
	50-PI-33	?	?	Passenger coach	
	19-S (Travelaire)	1961–1967	19- and 25-ft	Transit bus	
	33-S	1960s	?	Passenger motorcoach	33 to 37 passengers
	Le Normand	1957–1960	?	Intercity coach	
	Prévocar	1953	?	Intercity coach	
	Skycruiser	1948–1949	?	Motorcoach	
Suburban intercity model	Citadin	1948–1959	30- and 35-ft	Transit bus	33 to 37 passengers; 96 in (2,400 mm) wide
	Interurbain	1943–?	?	Motorcoach	First rear-engined bus.
	Suburbain	1939	?	Motorcoach	Last wood-bodied bus.
	Motorbus	1924	?	?	

== Ground Force One ==
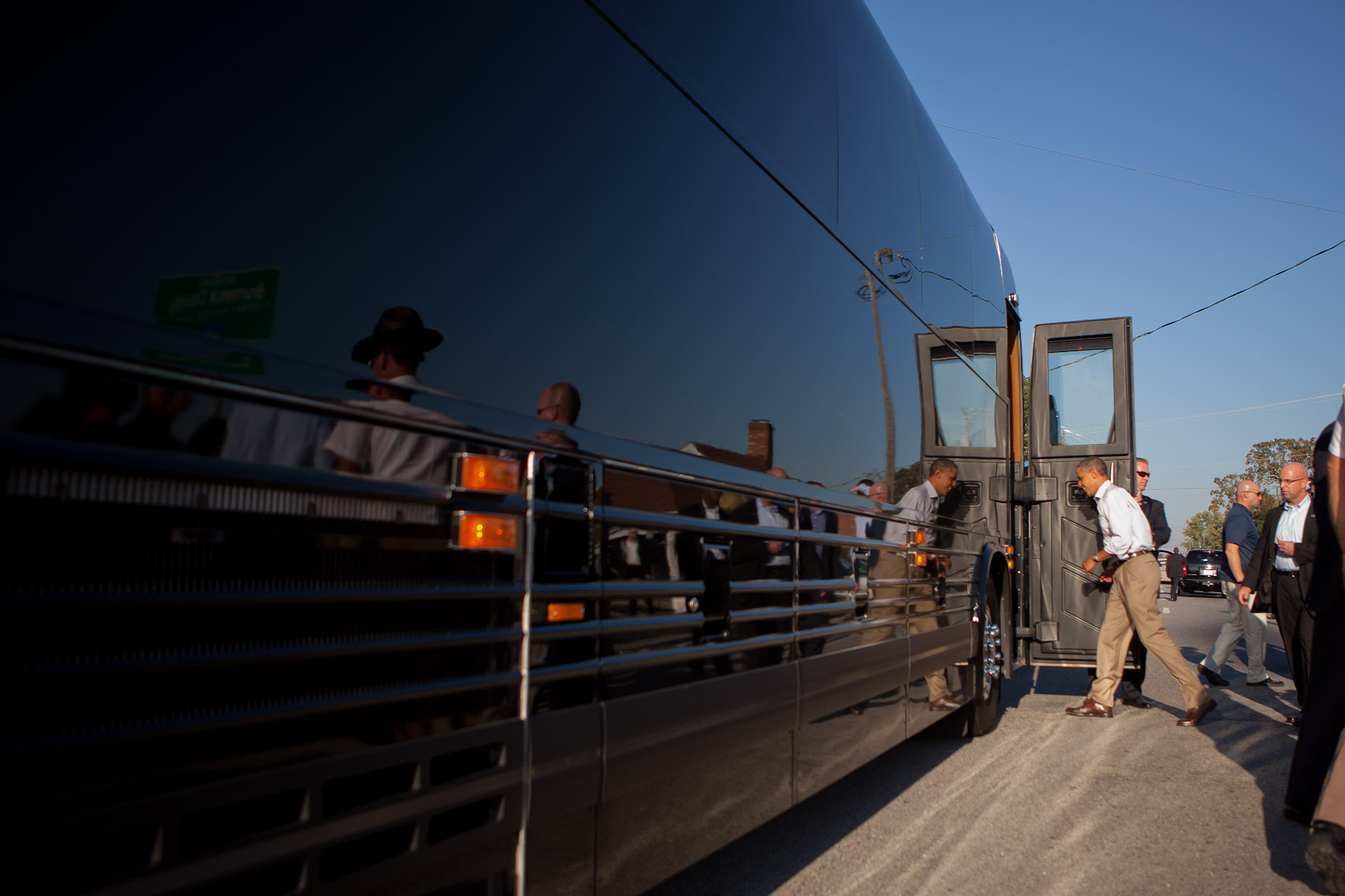
Then President Obama boards the "Ground Force One" bus in 2011.

Ground Force One is the nickname given to two heavily modified X3-45 VIP conversion coaches owned by the United States Secret Service and used by the President of the United States and other high-ranking politicians or dignitaries. Prevost built the coach as a conversion shell, the Hemphill Brothers Coach Company fitted out the interiors of the coach, and it is assumed that other features, like armor plating, were added by the Secret Service. Prior to acquiring the dedicated buses in 2011, the Secret Service would rent buses and retrofit them with temporary equipment.
