= Prevost H-Series =

Prevost H3-45
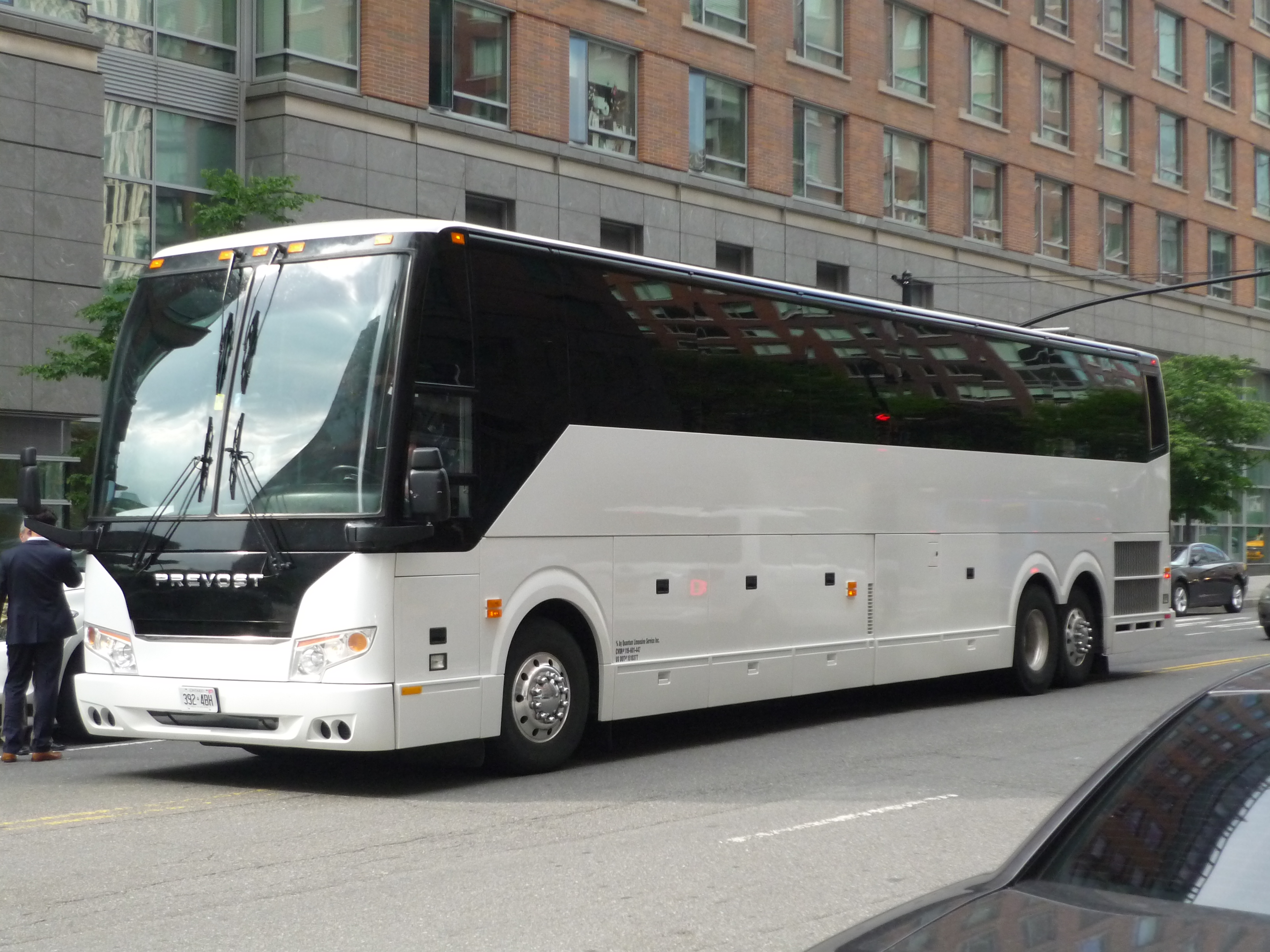
- Prevost H3-45 (2015), showing third generation updates from 2009

Overview
- Manufacturer: Prevost
- Model years: 1985–present

Powertrain
- Engine: Volvo D13, 12.8 L (780 cu in)
- Transmission: Allison "World"

Dimensions
- Wheelbase: 8,496 mm (334.5 in)
- Length: 13,716 mm (45 ft)
- Width: 2,578 mm (101.5 in)
- Height: 3,400 mm (133.875 in)

The Prevost H-Series is a family of motorcoaches and conversion shells designed and manufactured by Prevost, a subsidiary of Volvo Buses. The current model is the H3-45, which is a (nominal) 45-foot, 3-axle bus for the intercity bus and Class A conversion motorhome markets.

The first H-Series vehicle was released in 1985 as the H5-60, a 60-foot (nominal) articulated bus with five axles, including two steering axles in front. It was followed by the 40-foot rigid body H3-40 in 1989. After 45-foot buses were legalized, in 1994, Prevost released the H3-45 and updated the H3-40 to the 41-foot H3-41. Since then, the H-Series buses have been updated in 2002, 2009, and 2023. Production of the other models has been discontinued and the 45-foot H3-45 remains in production. It competes with the MCI J-Series.

== Design ==
Visually, the H3-41 and H3-45 may be distinguished by counting the number of baggage compartment doors between the front and rear wheels; H3-41 have three, while H3-45 has four. The H3-40 also has three baggage compartment doors, but arranged with one door close to the front axle and two close to the rear axles, while the H3-41 has two forward and one aft.

Since 2011, the standard engine is a Volvo D13 diesel engine, coupled to an Allison "World Bus" 6-speed automatic transmission. Prior to that, the H-Series was equipped with Detroit Diesel Series 92 and Series 60 engines.

Prevost also sells the H3-45 VIP as a conversion shell version. The VIP is finished with a minimal interior and marketed to upfitters, who add fixtures and sell the customized vehicle as a Class A motorhome.

The passenger deck features an interior height of 77 in (1.96 m), and there is up to 460 cu ft (13 m^{3}) of storage under the passenger floor.

Prevost H-Series key dimensions
Vehicle Stat.	H5-60	H3-40	H3-41		H3-45		
Vehicle Stat.	H5-60	H3-40	1994	2002, 2009	1994	2002, 2009	2023
Length (nom.)	60 ft (18.3 m)	40 ft (12.2 m)	41 ft (12.5 m)	41 ft 7 in (12.7 m)	45 ft (13.7 m)	45 ft 8 in (13.9 m)	45 ft (13.7 m)
Height (Note: Hatches closed)	12 ft (3.7 m)			146 1/4 in (3.7 m)	12 ft (3.7 m)	146 1/4 in (3.7 m)	148 in (3.8 m)
Wheelbase (Note: Wheelbase is measured from the front axle to the drive axle, which is the forward rear axle that has dual wheels, unless otherwise noted.)	23 ft 11 in (7.29 m) (Note: Wheelbase is measured from the center of the tandem front steering axles to the center of the tandem middle driving axles.)	280 in (7.11 m)	268 in (6.81 m)	267 in (6.78 m)	317 in (8.05 m)	316 1/4 in (8.03 m)	313.4 in (7.96 m)
Overhang F/R	72 / 69 in (1,829 / 1,753 mm)	69.5 / 82.5 in (1,765 / 2,096 mm)	71.5 / 103.5 in (1,816 / 2,629 mm)	75 / 107 in (1,905 / 2,718 mm)	71.5 / 103.5 in (1,816 / 2,629 mm)	75 / 107 in (1,905 / 2,718 mm)	75 / 108.37 in (1,905 / 2,753 mm)
Dry weight	45,900 lb (20,820 kg)	30,080 lb (13,644 kg)	32,400 lb (14,696 kg)	35,535 lb (16,118 kg)	33,800 lb (15,331 kg)	36,585 lb (16,595 kg)	37,950 lb (17,214 kg)
GVWR	59,140 lb (26,830 kg)	42,690 lb (19,364 kg)	49,000 lb (22,226 kg)	52,060 lb (23,614 kg)	49,000 lb (22,226 kg)	52,060 lb (23,614 kg)	53,000 lb (24,040 kg)

== History ==
H-Series buses

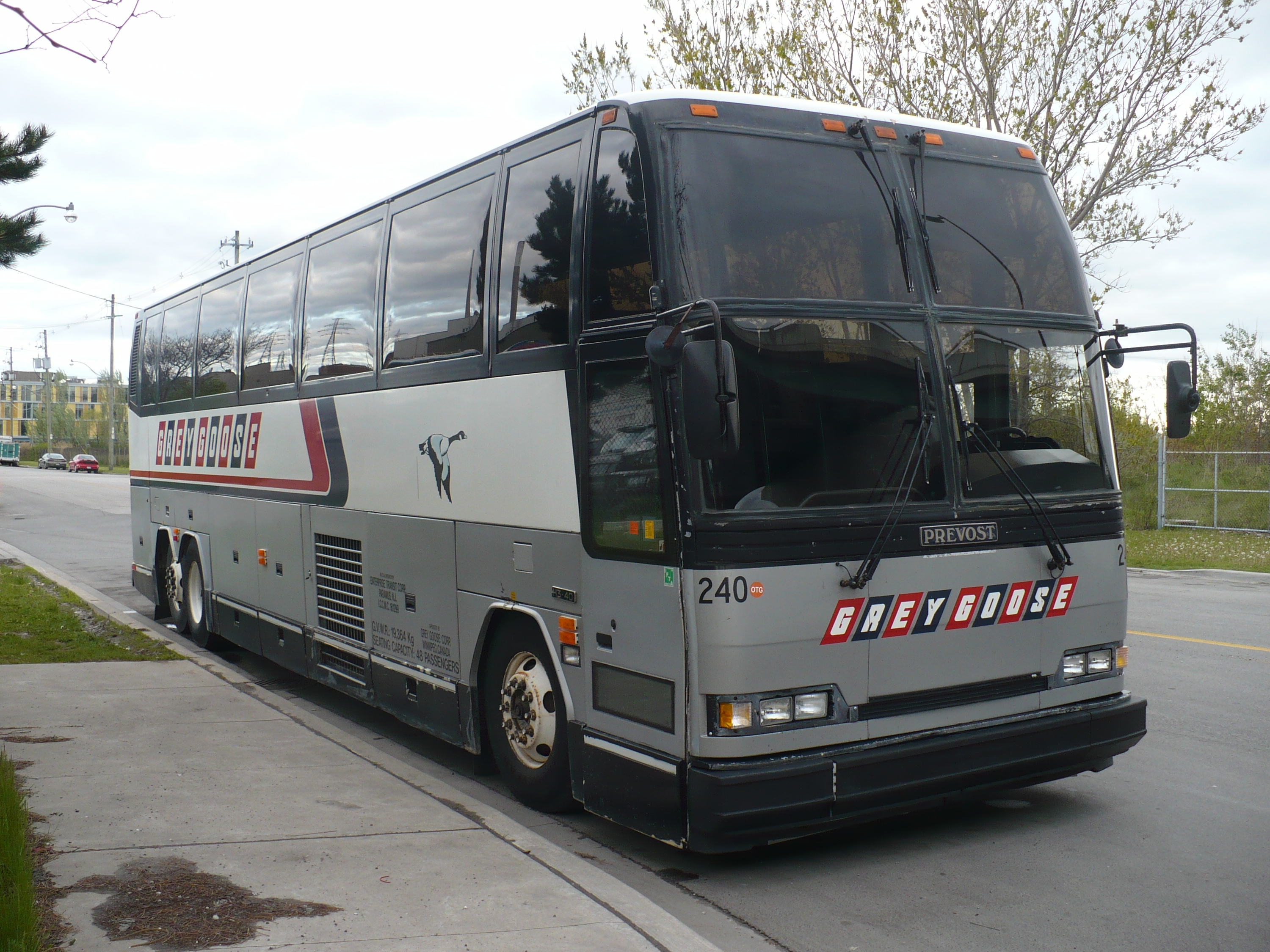
H3-40 (1989–1994)

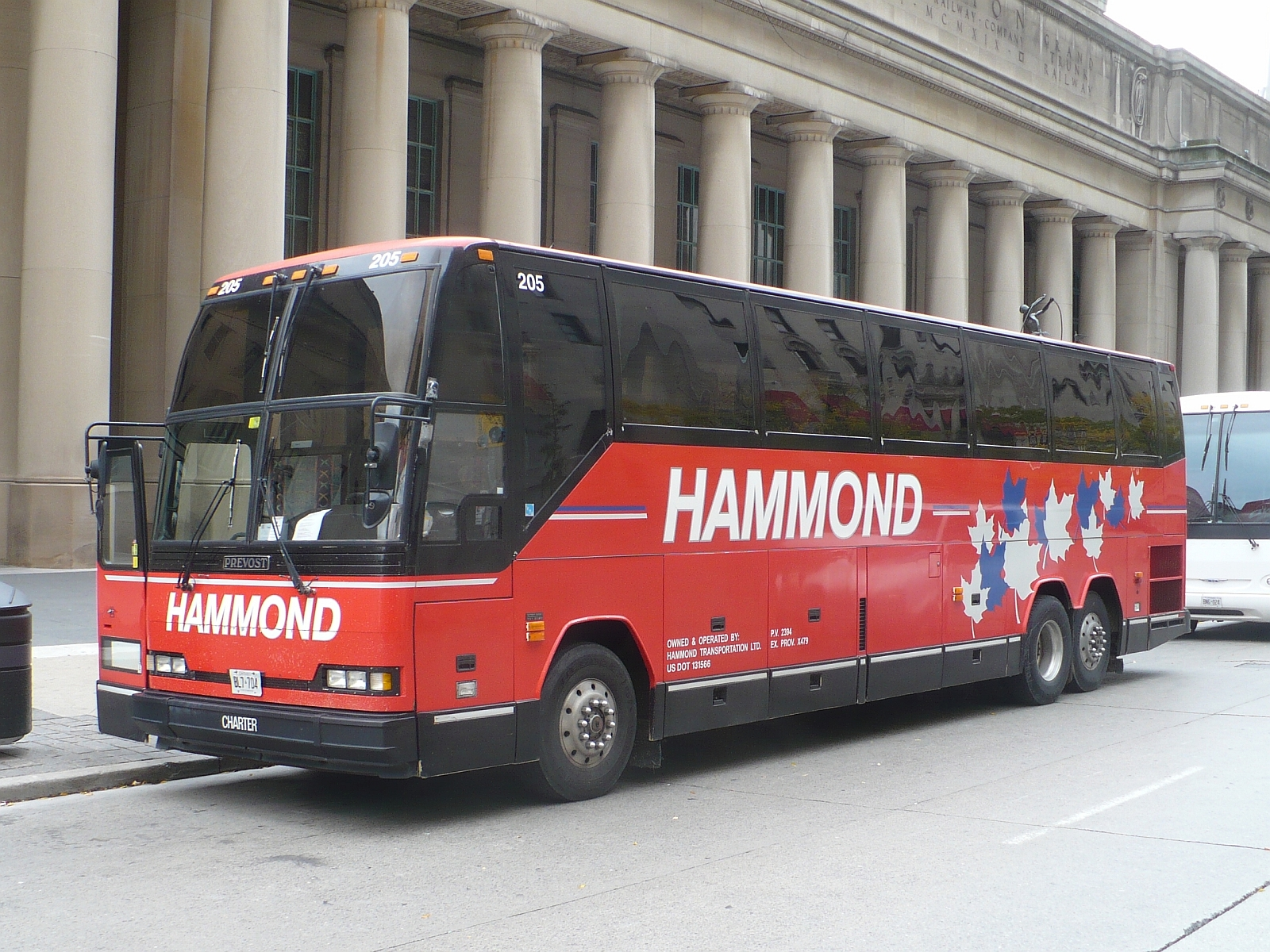
H3-41 gen 1 (1994–2002)

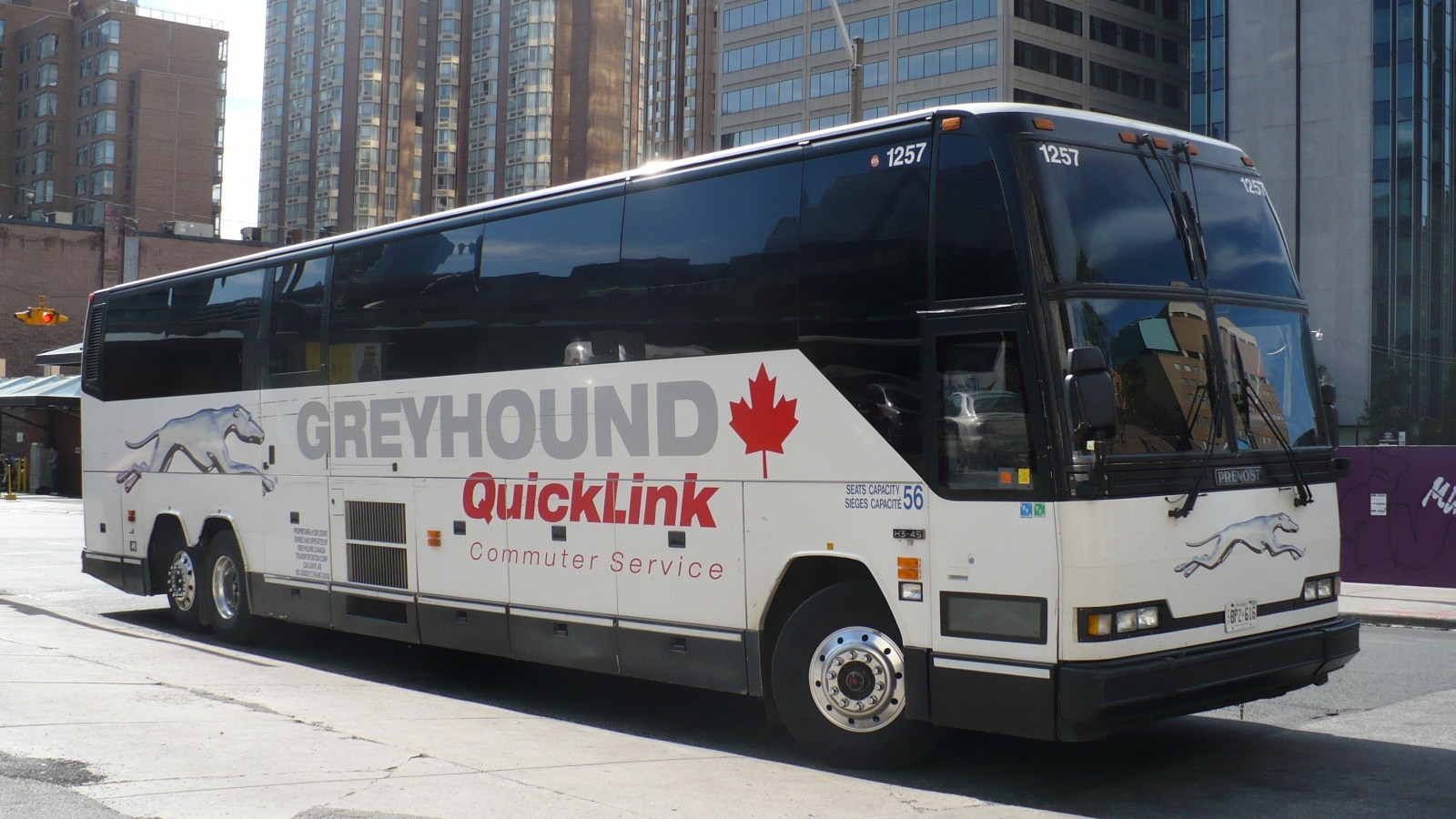
H3-45 gen 1 (1994–2002): four-pane windshield, sealed beam headlamps

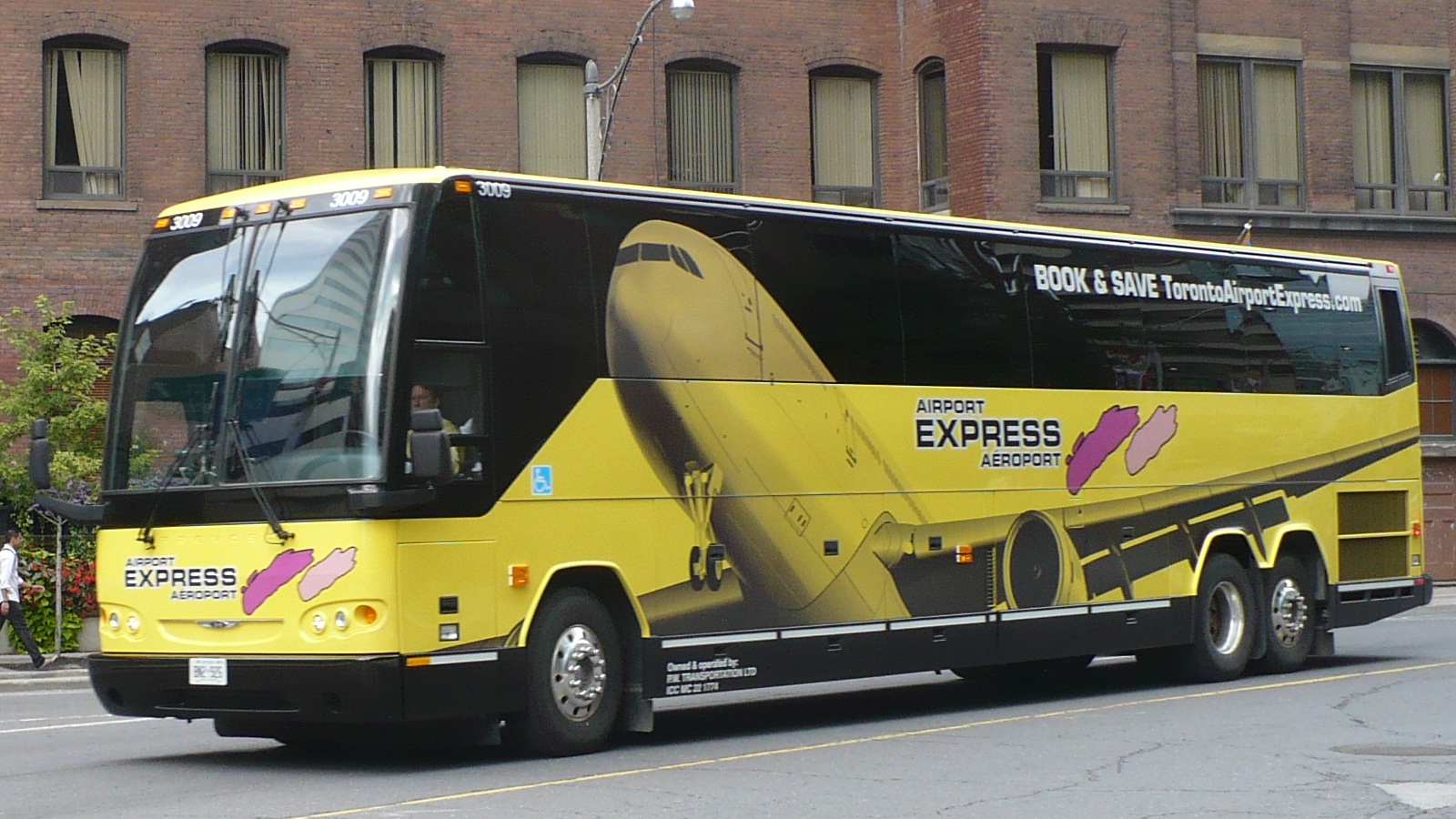
H3-45 gen 2 (2002–2009): two-pane windshield, projector headlamps

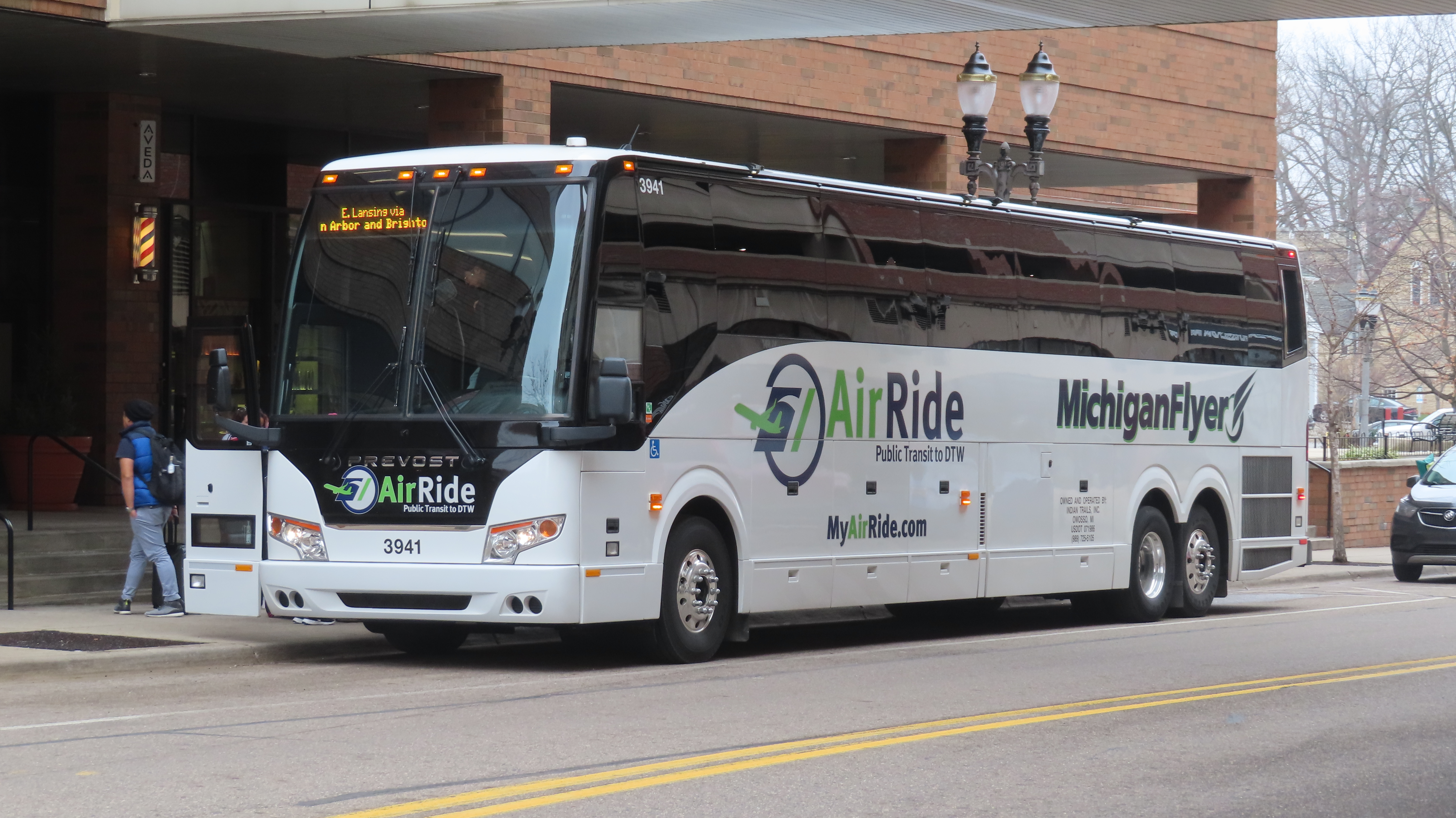
H3-45 gen 3 (2009–2023): composite headlamps, round wheel arches

The articulated H5-60 was the first H-Series bus to be introduced. Just 46 H5-60s were completed in four years of production, with sales hampered by the initial, operating, and maintenance costs.

The rigid body H-Series buses were updated in 2002, 2009, and 2023. With the 2023 update, the shorter H3-41 was discontinued, leaving the H3-45 as the sole H-Series bus in production.
