= Katalin Bogyay =

Hungarian politician, journalist, television personality; UNESCO executive

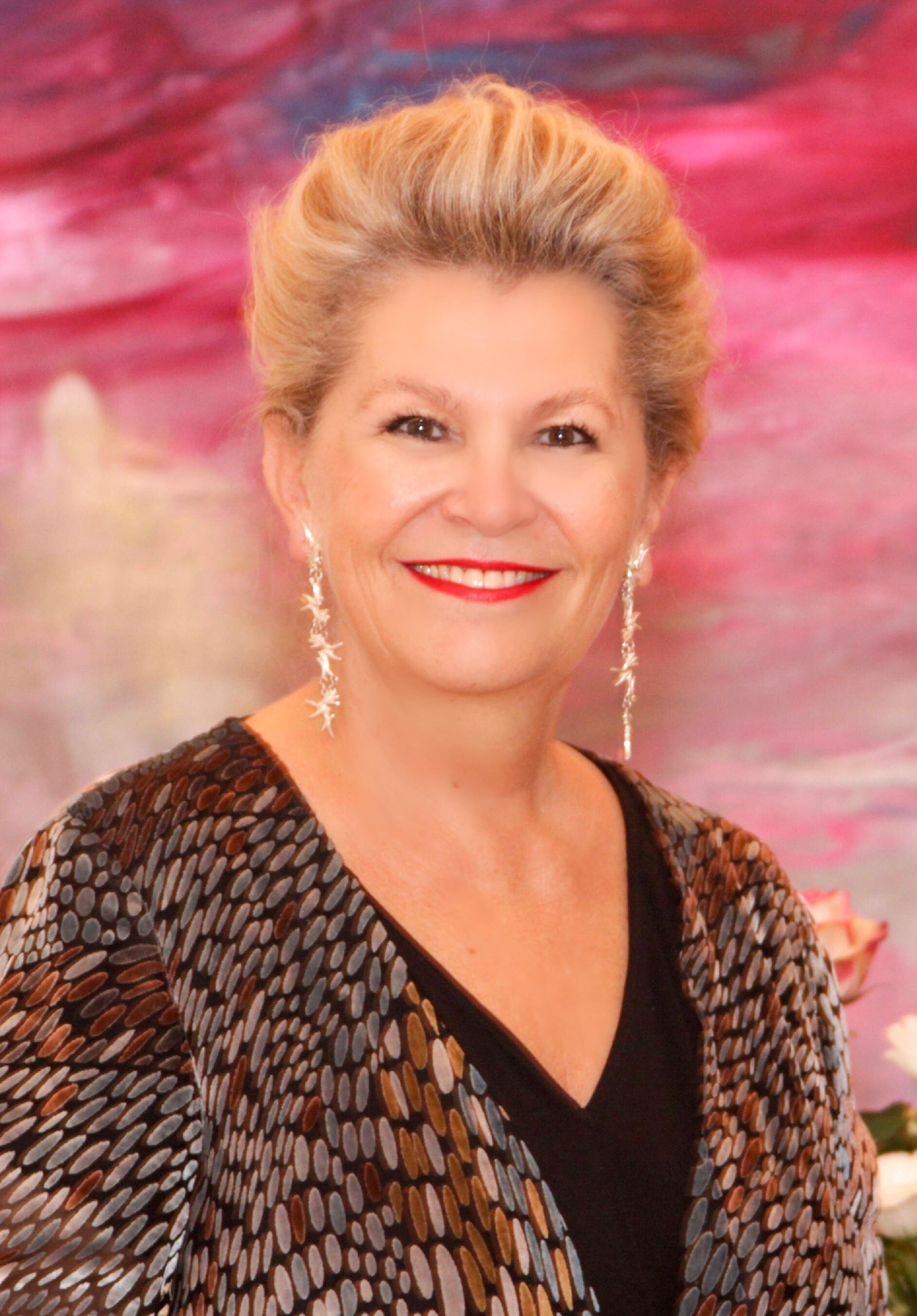
- Ambassador Katalin Bogyay
- Born: Székesfehérvár, Hungarian People's Republic
- Education: Corvinus University of Budapest; University of Westminster, London
- Occupations: Diplomat; Television broadcaster President of the United Nations Association of Hungary
- Notable work: President of the 36th session of UNESCO General Conference (2011–2013)

Katalin Annamária Bogyay is a Hungarian ambassador, diplomat, and journalist.

She was elected President of the World Federation of United Nations Associations (WFUNA) in August 2026 in Geneva.

She has been the president of the Hungarian National Commission for UNESCO since January 2026. She became president of the United Nations Association of Hungary in April 2021.

She has been a lecturer at the Corvinus University of Budapest since 2022, and teaching at the Hungarian Diplomatic Academy since 2021. In 2021 she founded the Women4Diplomacy movement. She served as the 15th Permanent Representative of Hungary to the United Nations in New York (1 January 2015 - 31 December 2020). She is the former Ambassador Extraordinary and Plenipotentiary and Permanent Delegate of Hungary to UNESCO (2009–2014) and the President of the 36th session of UNESCO General Conference (2011–2013).

== Early life and education ==
Katalin Annamária Bogyay was born in Székesfehérvár, Hungary. She graduated in Economics at the Corvinus University of Budapest and obtained a Master of Arts in Communications from the University of Westminster (London) with Chevening Scholarship.

== Career ==
Bogyay began her career as a theatre and music critic, later becoming a presenter, producer, and senior editor of music and the arts at the Hungarian National Television (Magyar Televízió or MTV). Following the fall of communism, in 1990 she became the first Hungarian television personality to be awarded a Know How Fund Scholarship to study media in democracy at the BBC.

After hosting galas and interviewing celebrities from all over the world, she hosted her own show, Katalin Bogyay and her Guests (2003-2004, MTV/Hungary). Bogyay went on to become an international broadcaster and documentary filmmaker, working throughout the 1990s as an independent producer based in London notably for European Business News, BBC Radio, Global Vision Network, MTV, Danube TV.

=== Politics and diplomacy ===
In 1999 she became a diplomat and began working for the Hungarian Ministry for Culture. As Director General she opened the Hungarian Cultural Centre in 1999 in the heart of London's Covent Garden. She was the director of the Centre until 2006. To mark Hungary's entry to the EU in 2004, Bogyay created Magyar Magic, a seventeen-month long festival celebrating Hungarian talent throughout Britain under the dual patronage of Queen Elizabeth II and H.E. Dr. Ferenc Mádl, the President of the Republic of Hungary.

In 2007 Bogyay was selected by the London School of Economics as one of the Top 50 thinkers in the publication EU The Next Fifty Years. In her invited editorial she wrote about the new European cultural space.

In 2007 she represented Eastern, Central and Southern Europe as one of the deputy chairpersons of the Cultural Committee at the UNESCO's General Conference. Between July 2006 and April 2009, she served as the State Secretary for International Affairs at the Hungarian Ministry of Education and Culture. Since September 2009 until December 2014 she was based in Paris as Hungary's Ambassador to UNESCO. In 2009 she served as one of the vice presidents of the 35th General Conference of the UNESCO.

On 5 October 2011 UNESCO's Executive Board unanimously proposed Bogyay as President of UNESCO's 36th General Conference. On 25 October 2011, the General Conference of unanimously elected Bogyay as President of UNESCO's 36th General Conference. She succeeded Davidson L. Hepburn (Commonwealth of The Bahamas) who presided the 35th session. On 5 November 2013 the General Conference elected Hao Ping, the Vice-Minister of Education of China as President of UNESCO's 37th General Conference.

=== United Nations ===
Bogyay was appointed Ambassador and Permanent Representative of Hungary to the UN in New York and took office as head of the Hungarian Mission to the UN in New York on 1 January 2015.

She chaired the United Nations Committee on Conferences in 2016-2017. The Conference Committee decides upon the yearly Calendar of Conferences of all UN duty stations, ensures that conference services, translation and interpretation work smoothly during all UN meetings.

In January 2017, the President of the General Assembly appointed Tajikistan and Hungary, H.E. Ms Katalin Bogyay, Permanent Representative to the UN as Co-Moderators of the working-level dialogue to discuss improving the integration and coordination of the work of the United Nations on the water-related Sustainable Development (SDG) goals and targets, as well as a subsequent dialogue to take stock of progress made and exchange views on possible next steps.

In 2018, the Executive Board of the International Association of Permanent Representatives (IAPR) to the United Nations elected Ambassador Katalin Bogyay as their new president. The Association serves as a forum between former and active Permanent Representatives.

She is a vocal advocate of women's empowerment, a "Gender Champion", and started a thematic meeting series of the Circle of Women Ambassador in the UN to cover issues such as implementation of the SDGs or preventive diplomacy.

In 2019, she served as the vice president of the UN Women Executive Board, a global entity dedicated to gender equality and the empowerment of women. Ambassador Bogyay hosts a salon series to build bridges between the UN and the city of New York through cultural diplomacy, art, music and poetry.

Bogyay was appointed by María Fernanda Espinosa Garcés, president of the 73rd Session of United Nations General Assembly with Ambassador Vitavas Srivihok, Permanent Representative of Thailand to the United Nations to co-facilitate the negotiations of Universal Health Coverage political declaration for the high-level meeting on Universal Health Coverage during the 74th Session of the United Nations General Debate in 2019.

Bogyay was appointed to the Nelson Mandela Prize 2020 Selection Committee. The prize is awarded every 5 years to those who dedicated their lives to the service of humanity in the promotion of reconciliation, social cohesion, and community development.

In June 2020, Bogyay was elected unanimously by 193 Member States as Chair of the Committee of Social, Humanitarian & Cultural Issues (Third Main Committee) for the 75th Session of the UN General Assembly (2020-2021). Examination of human rights questions is at the forefront of the Committee’s activity, while it also discusses questions relating to the advancement of women, the protection of children, indigenous issues, the promotion of fundamental freedoms through the elimination of racism and racial discrimination, and the right to self-determination, intercultural and interfaith dialogue. The Committee also addresses important social development questions such as issues related to youth, family, ageing, persons with disabilities, crime prevention, criminal justice, and international drug control. Bogyay was also a member of the General Committee of the 75th UN General Assembly.

==== 60th anniversary of the 1956 Hungarian Revolution in the UN ====
After the crush of the Hungarian Revolution of 1956, since the Security Council was unable to act, it was the General Assembly that adopted a number of resolutions on the matter and established the so-called Special Committee on the Problem of Hungary.

The UN Archives keeps numerous documents concerning the 1956 Revolution and the following events. In 2016 Ambassador Bogyay, with the support of the Hungarian Government, requested to open and declassify the previously classified documents after 60 years for research purposes. The UN Secretariat opened up more than 400 pages of previously classified documents for research purposes. Moreover, more than 1000 pages of UN documents kept at Columbia University have also been declassified, and are therefore available for public research.

Bogyay hosted a series of events, including a roundtable discussion on the “1956 Hungarian Revolution and the 20th Century Democratization Processes" as well as a historic panel discussion to honor the memory of Povl Bang-Jensen.Under her leadership, Hungary, for the first time, co-hosted the UN Day Gala Concert, that marks the birth of the United Nations in 1945 through the universal language of music. The theme of this year’s concert was “Freedom First”. The Permanent Mission of Hungary to the United Nations and iASK Institute of Advance Studies Kőszeg published book A CRY FOR FREEDOM: Reflections on the 1956 Hungarian Revolution at the UN and Beyond by Bogyay, as well as created Statues of Remembrance by Hedva Ser, UNESCO Goodwill Ambassador és Special Envoy for Cultural Diplomacy, based on the concept of the Ambassador.

== Awards and honors ==
She is a Fellow of the Royal Society of Arts (FRSA) and of the World Academy of Art and Science (FWAAS). In 2005, she was awarded the Knight's Cross Order of Merit of the Republic of Hungary for her contribution to international culture. In 2012, she was awarded an Honorary Doctor of Letters from the University of Glasgow for her work in building cultural links between Hungary and Scotland, as well as promoting cultural diversity and cultural diplomacy throughout the world. In 2013, on the occasion of the 50th anniversary of the International Fair Play Committee Bogyay was awarded the Special Trophy of Fair Play to her contribution in sports diplomacy. In 2014, she was awarded the Commander's Cross of the Hungarian Order of Merit for her achievements in culture and cultural diplomacy.

She is an International Advisory Board Member of the Institute for Cultural Diplomacy (ICD - Berlin) and President of the Program The Arts and Cultural Diplomacy. Ambassador Bogyay is an International Advisory Board Member of the Institute of Advanced Studies Kőszeg (iASK). In 2016, she was awarded a Doctor Honoris Causa from the Pannon University for her work in multilateral and cultural diplomacy. In 2016 she received the Global Citizenship Award from the James Jay Dudley Luce Foundation for embodying the characteristics of honor, intelligence, benevolence, and integrity Ambassador Bogyay received an Honorary Professor distinction from the Utah Valley University in April 2016.

On United Nations Day in 2017 she received the Spirit of the UN Award from the NGO Committee on Spirituality, Values and Global Concern. Ambassador Bogyay received the "Women of Distinction 2017 – Global Leadership Award in Social Justice/Development" by Celebrating Women International in 2017. She is a member of the Athena 40 Global Committee. In 2020, on the occasion of the International Day of the Girl Child, Bogyay received the Last Girl Leadership Award, for raising awareness and championing the global fight against human trafficking and modern day slavery. The honor was awarded by Apne Aap Women Worldwide, an India- and US-based human rights organisation.

She is a founding member of the Women for Hungary Club, an organisation that was established with the aim of making the family and career complementary and not conflicting factors in Hungarian women's lives. She is Honorary Citizen of the City of Mór

In 2021, she received the Countess Antonia Zichy Award for her outstanding role in international diplomacy and community building. She has become member of the Hungarian National Commission for UNESCO. In 2024, she was granted the Ambassador of Art award, that was established by the Jövője Van Foundation. In 2025, Katalin Bogyay received the Athena40 Award in the UN SDGs Ambassador category in London, recognising her dedication and lifetime achievements in cultural diplomacy and her leadership in women's empowerment and gender equality. In 2025, the Széchenyi István University awarded her an honorary doctorate in recognition of her work, through which she has consistently championed the causes of peace, multilateral diplomacy, education, and the arts.

== Books ==
She has published several books: a biography on Hungarian actress Margit Dajka (1989, Officina Nova, Budapest ) as well as another biographical work on János Pilinszky, a Hungarian poet (1990, Officina Nova, Budapest). Találkozásaim a nagyvilágban (My encounters around the globe) is a collection of interviews with internationally acclaimed artists and scientists (1996, H.G.& Co.Budapest). The Voice of Freedom-A szabadság hangja (2006, HCC, London) is a compilation of interviews on the subject of the 1956 revolution. In the interview book: A Magyar kultúra szolgálatában (Serving Hungarian Culture, interviewed by Hedvig Dvorszky, 2010, Kairosz), Budapest she gives an insight about her professional life. The Art of Cultural Diplomacy: Panorama of the Presidency, (2013, Espace Cinko- UNESCO, Paris) and Elnökségem története (2014, Holnap Kiadó, Budapest) are about her work as the President of UNESCO`s General Conference (2011–13). In 2017, it was published in China by Yilin Press. Her book on the 1956 Revolution at the UN called “A CRY FOR FREEDOM: Reflections on the 1956 Hungarian Revolution at the UN and Beyond” was published in 2017 in New York. To pay tribute to the Hungarian poet, János Pilinszky on his 100th birthday, she has revisited her former interview book and made a new series of interviews with contemporary thinkers (Pilinszky újra..., 2021, Holnap Kiadó, Budapest).

== Personal life ==
Her husband is a lawyer in Budapest and her son Tamás is a Counsel in the London office of Reed Smith LLP.

Diplomatic posts
Preceded by -	Cultural Counsellor, Director General of the Hungarian Cultural Centre, London; 1999–2006	Succeeded by Ildikó Takács
Preceded by András Lakatos	Ambassador, Permanent Delegate of Hungary to UNESCO, Paris; 2009–2014	Succeeded by Zoltán Cséfalvay
Preceded by Davidson Hepburn	President of the UNESCO General Conference; 2011–2013	Succeeded by Hao Ping
Preceded by Csaba Kőrösi	Ambassador, Permanent Representative of Hungary to the United Nations; 2015–	Succeeded by Incumbent
