= MCI J-Series =

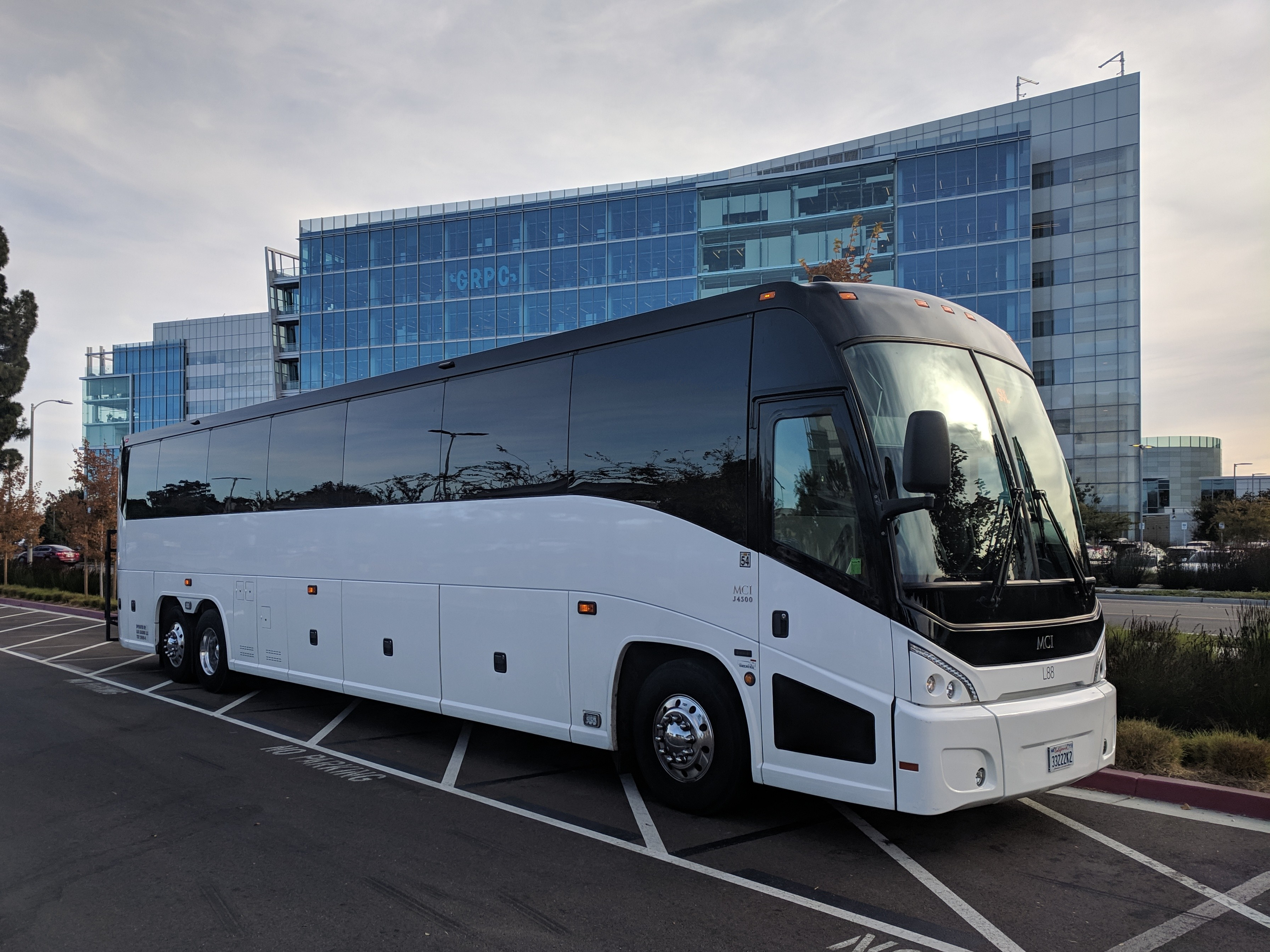
- A post-facelift J4500 operating as a Google employee bus

Overview
- Manufacturer: Motor Coach Industries
- Production: 2001-present
- Assembly: Crookston, Minnesota, United States; Winnipeg, Manitoba, Canada

Body and chassis
- Class: Tri-axle coach
- Body style: Single-decker coach
- Doors: 1 sedan door, some have 1 wheelchair lift door
- Floor type: High-floor
- Chassis: MCI special platform integral

Powertrain
- Engine: Detroit Diesel Series 60, Detroit Diesel DD13, Caterpillar C12, Caterpillar C13, Cummins ISM, Cummins ISX, Cummins X12
- Capacity: Up to 44 (J3500); Up to 60 (J4500)

Dimensions
- Length: 35 feet (11 m) (J3500); 45 feet (14 m) (J4500)
- Width: 102 inches (2.6 m)
- Height: 141 inches (3.6 m)
- Curb weight: 42,000 lbs GVWR (J3500); 54,000 lbs GVWR (J4500)

Chronology
- Predecessor: MCI E-Series (post-facelift J4500); MCI F-Series (J3500)

The MCI J-Series is a model of motorcoach bus produced by Motor Coach Industries (MCI). The bus is primarily used by tour and charter bus operators. It is sold alongside the MCI D-Series bus, primarily used by intercity bus services and public transit operators.

The J-Series was introduced in 2001 initially as a mid-range supplement for the D- and E-Series coaches in the MCI coach lineup. It is manufactured at the NFI Group facility in Crookston, Minnesota, United States as well as in Winnipeg, Manitoba, Canada.

== Development ==
=== Background ===
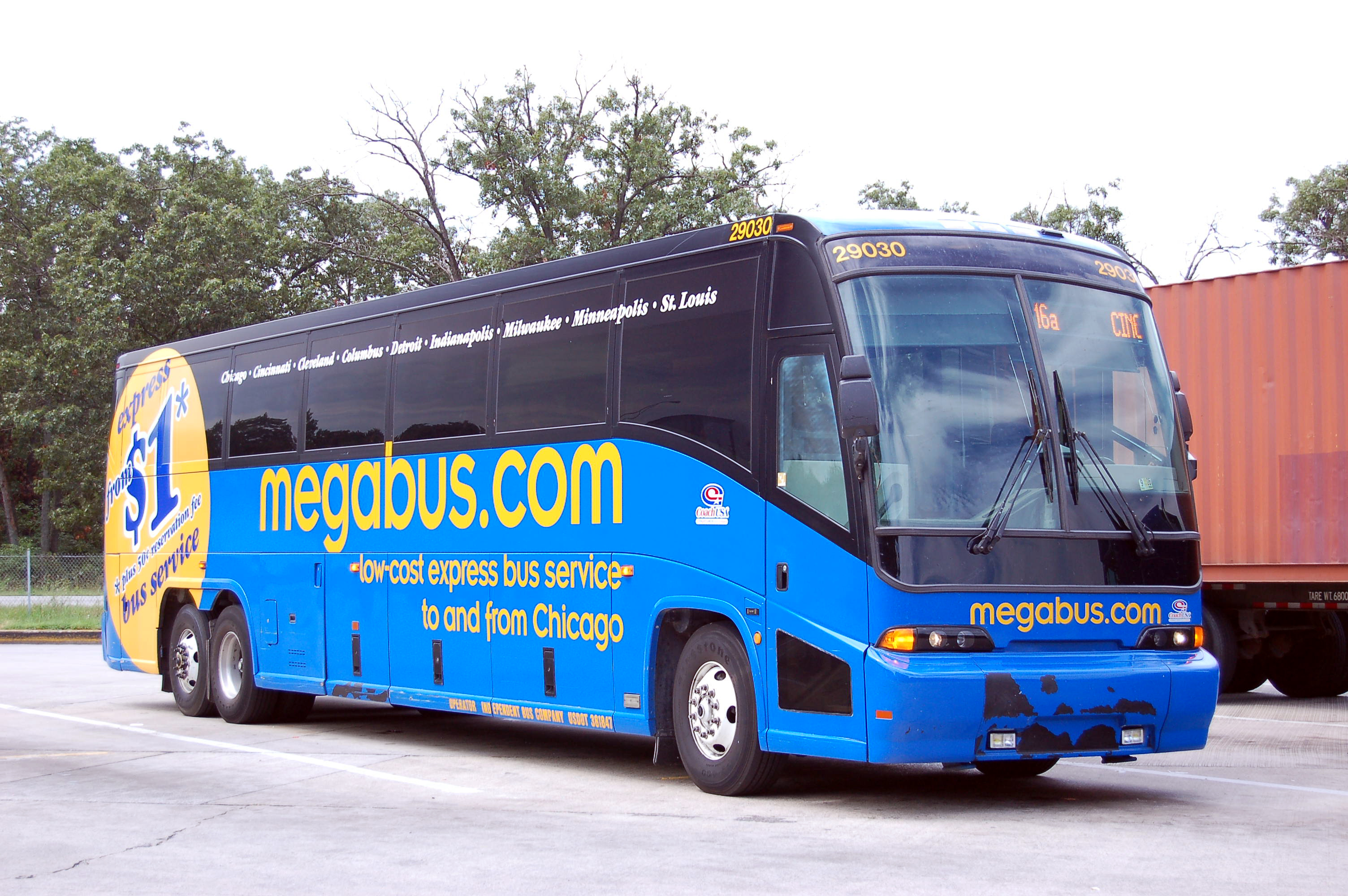
A 102-EL3 coach. The design of this coach series inspired the J-Series.

In 1998, MCI introduced the 102-EL3. Also known as the Renaissance, it was a new coach introduced to compete with the Prevost H-Series. The E-Series featured an all new body (designed by Designworks) and it introduced many new features such as a curved stepwell, a steerable tag axle, electronically controlled air suspension and disc brakes. Due to the rushed development of the E-Series, some of the coach's features were unreliable at the beginning prompting MCI to develop a companion coach model. In 2001, the 102-EL3 was renamed to the E4500 bringing it in line with MCI's new nomenclature for their coaches.

=== Introduction ===
In 2001, MCI introduced the J-Series at the 2001 UMA Motorcoach Expo. The J-Series retained most of the Designworks designed body from the E-Series but with minor changes. However, many of the new on-board technologies on the E-Series were removed in order to appeal to customers looking for a lower-cost coach with a modern design but with simpler on-board technologies.

== Variants ==
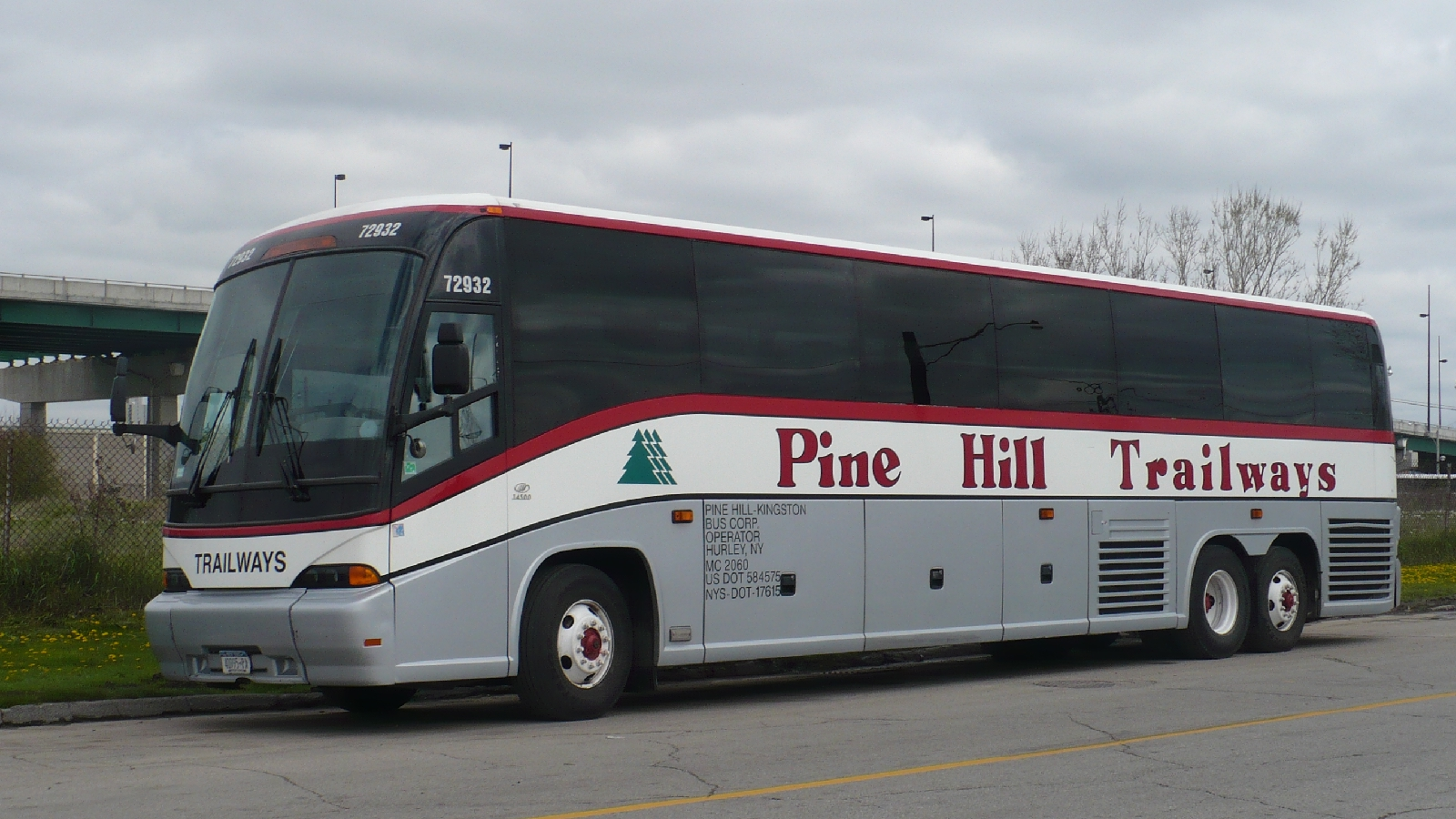
A pre-facelift J4500 operated by Pine Hill Trailways

=== J4500 ===
The J4500 was introduced in 2001 as a model to fill the gap in MCI's product line between the D4500 and E4500. It combined the modern design of the E-Series with the more basic on-board technologies of the D-Series. In 2004, MCI added disc brakes as an option. In 2010, MCI added Bendix suspension system to the J4500, improving handling.

==== Facelift ====
In 2013, MCI updated the design of the J-Series with re-designed headlights and a more squared off body. As well as changes to the exterior new features were also added in 2013 such as a steerable tag axle. Due to the added features and new design, the E-Series was quietly discontinued. In 2018, the interior was re-designed and luggage lights were added as an option.

==== J4500 CHARGE (battery-electric) ====
In May 2018, MCI announced that its prototype battery-electric J-Series coach (then known as the J4500e) successfully completed phase one of its testing. In 2021, MCI announced the production electric version of the J-Series called the J4500 CHARGE, with the "CHARGE" suffix meaning "Battery-Electric" in NFI Group's nomenclature. The J4500 CHARGE has a range of 200 miles and is powered by Siemens electric motors.

=== J3500 ===
The J3500 was introduced in 2018 as a shorter 35-foot version of the existing 45-foot model to compete with other similar 35-foot coaches such as the TEMSA TS-35 and Van Hool CX35. The J3500 is MCI's first 35-foot coach since the discontinuation of the DINA produced F3500. The first J3500 was delivered to Tuscaloosa Charter Service in January 2019.

== See also ==
- MCI D-Series
