= Jaya Jaya Myra =

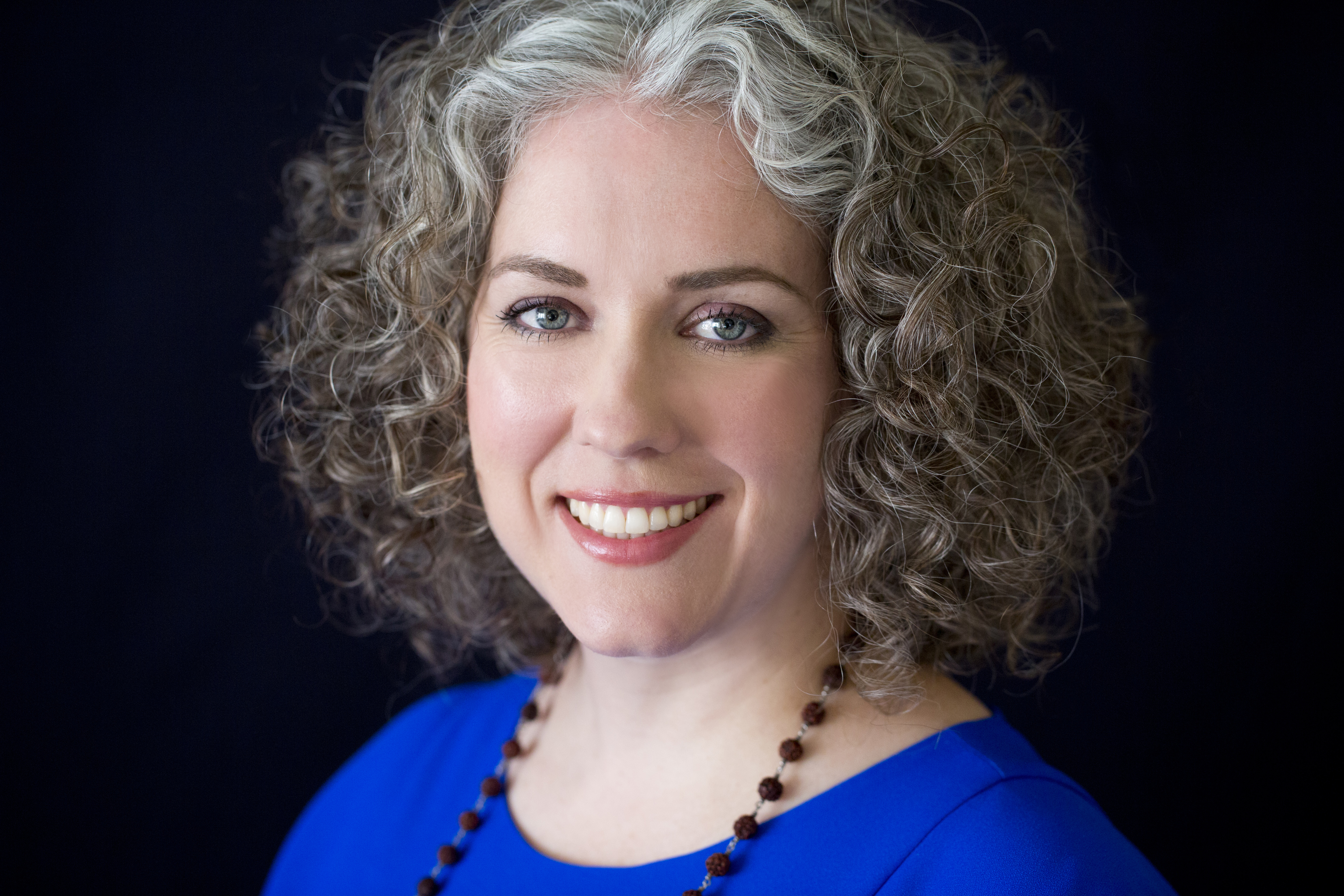
Jaya Jaya Myra

Jaya Jaya Myra, also known as Myra Godfrey, is an author and speaker on natural health, wellness, spirituality, and mind-body wellbeing. Her work emphasizes integrative mind-body approaches to wellness and stress reduction. She is based in New York City.

== Early life and education ==
Jaya Jaya Myra, also known as Myra Godfrey, became physically incapacitated by a clinically-diagnosed case of fibromyalgia while working as a research scientist and pursuing a PhD in cell and molecular biology; she was subsequently released from her employment on disability.

== Wellness techniques ==
After running through a course of conventional medical treatment with no change in her condition, she turned to complementary and alternative "healing modalities" which included meditation, mindfulness practices, and other aspects of Eastern philosophy. Using these approaches, she regained her health, which led her to advocate and teach techniques for natural health and wellness.

Jaya Jaya Myra's approach focuses on the interconnections between purpose, spirituality, and health, which she gave a TEDx talk on in November 2018. She created the WELL Method as a framework for these teachings to teach people what she calls the four cornerstones to a purpose-filled, healthy life. The WELL Method and more on the connection of purpose, spirituality and health are the subject of her book The Soul of Purpose.

== Media appearances ==
Jaya Jaya Myra has appeared on numerous TV programs, including the nationally broadcast daytime show Harry, NBC's CT Live! CBS as well as many radio programs and podcasts.

She has been quoted in numerous publications, including Parents, Today, Reader's Digest, Redbook, Better Homes & Gardens, Fox News, Brides, Bustle, Ecosalon, and others.

She has bylines in The Epoch Times, Tathaastu, Yoga Magazine, and Naturally Savvy.

== Speaking engagements ==
She has been a panelist for the United Nations' NGO Committee on Spirituality, Values and Global Concerns (CSVGC-NY). The program was entitled "Revealing the Divine Feminine: Unifying Oneness and Energy for All".

On the occasion of International Women's Day in 2018, she was a featured speaker at the Consulate General of India in New York City.

== Publications ==
Vibrational Healing: Attain Balance & Wholeness * Understand Your Energetic Type was published in February 2015 by Llewellyn Publications. The book teaches one how to determine their "basic energy type", which is supposedly broken down into elemental and guna composition (employing a framework used in Ayurveda). Using a five-element framework from Ayurvedic principles, various "healing modalities" are categorized by their elemental type and are allegedly paired to the specific energy types discussed.
