= Wanderu Inc. =

Ground and air travel metasearch engine

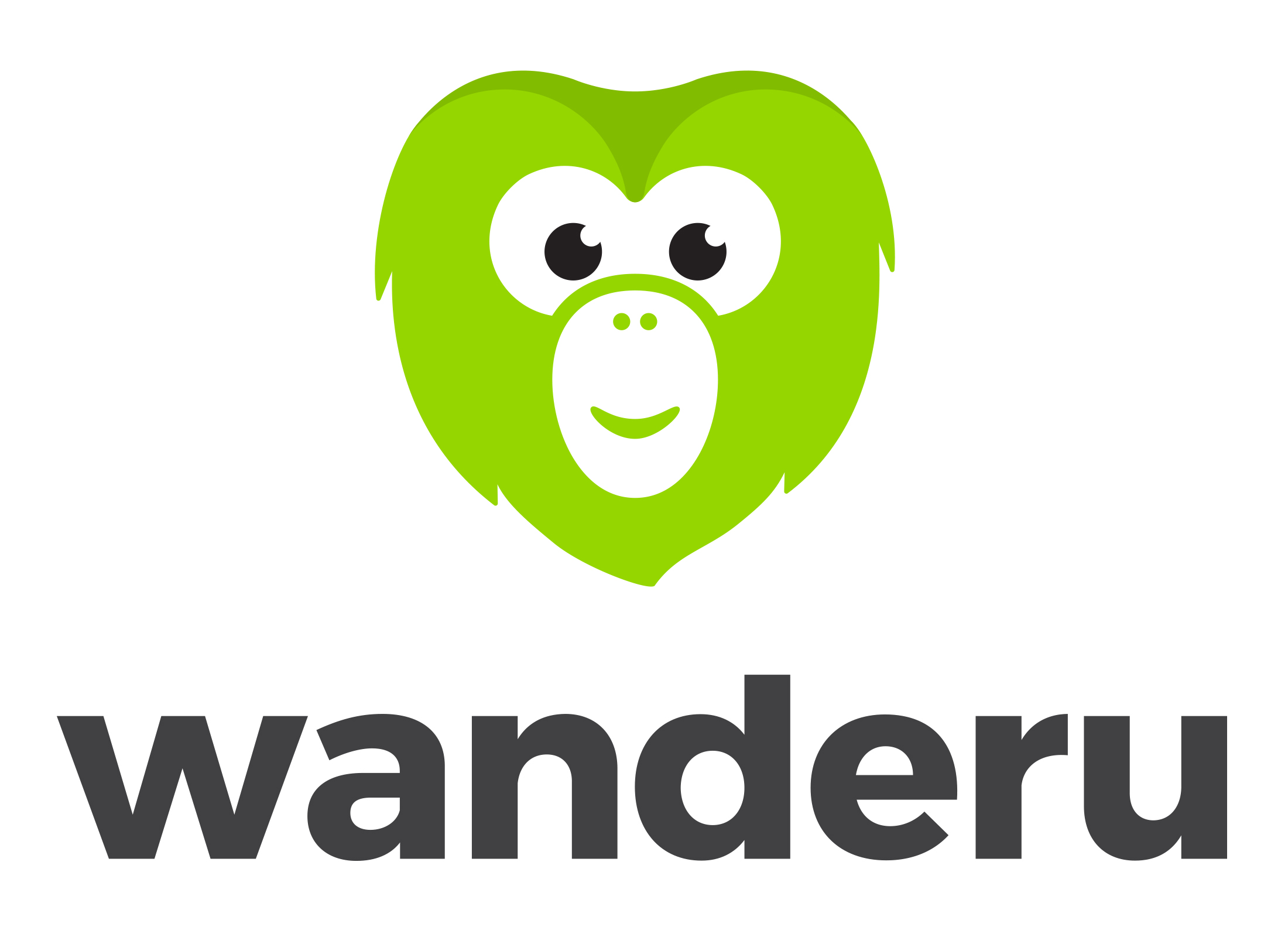
- Website type: Private
- Founded: February 27, 2012; 14 years ago
- Headquarters: Boston, Massachusetts, United States
- Area served: North America; Europe
- Key people: Polina Raygorodskaya, Co-Founder; Igor Bratnikov, Co-Founder; Andrew Savikas, CEO
- Industry: Travel; Technology
- Website: www.wanderu.com

Wanderu Inc. is a ground and air travel metasearch engine that operates throughout North America and Europe. It provides a search and booking platform for buses, trains, flights, and ferries through its website and mobile app. Founded in 2012, Wanderu is headquartered in Boston, Massachusetts.

== History ==
=== Foundation ===
Wanderu was founded in February 2012 by Igor Bratnikov and Polina Raygorodskaya while they were part of GreenXC, an organization intended to raise awareness for national parks and forests throughout the United States. The pair met while they were teenagers at a Russian-language after-school program. They conceived of the idea after a ride share cancelled on them and they had a difficult time finding a bus. Craig Lentzsch, former CEO of Greyhound, became an advisor to the company.

The company gained 20,000 user sign-ups while in beta. On August 12, 2013, Wanderu.com officially launched to the public, covering bus, train travel, and ferries within the Northeastern United States.

=== Growth in North America ===
In August 2013, the company raised $2.45 million in a funding round led by Alta Ventures. Investors included Jeff Clarke, chairman of Orbitz. At the time, the company had partnerships with companies such as BoltBus, Go Buses, Concord Coach Lines, and Trailways of New York.

In May 2014, Wanderu announced a partnership with Greyhound. As a result, Wanderu acquired nationwide coverage.

In November 2014, the company raised $5.6 million in series A funding.

In February 2015, Wanderu released a smartphone application for iOS devices, followed by the release an Android version in March 2015.

In April 2015, Wanderu signed a partnership with Amtrak. As a result, Wanderu's coverage increased to over 90% of the U.S. reachable by ground.

Wanderu partnered with bus companies Grupo Senda and Tufesa in November 2015 to offer trips to multiple destinations across Mexico, as well as options for cross-border travel between Mexico and the United States.

In February 2016, Wanderu announced a partnership with VIA Rail, an intercity passenger rail service in Canada.

=== Expansion to Europe ===
In January 2017, Wanderu expanded into Europe, launching service to more than 1,000 destinations across more than 20 countries, including Germany, France, Austria, Belgium, the Netherlands, Switzerland, and the United Kingdom, among other places.

In Europe, Wanderu partnered over 160 bus and train travel providers, including Flixbus, OUIBUS, and National Express.

In October 2019, through a partnership with Kayak.com, Wanderu added flights alongside bus and train travel options, allowing users to find and compare bus, train and plane trips to North America and European destinations. The company also partnered with flight-data provider Skyscanner.

=== Continued Growth ===
In June 2024, Wanderu appointed Andrew Savikas as its chief executive officer. Savikas succeeded Wanderu co-founder Polina Raygorodskaya, who stepped down after 12 years of service and assumed the role of Executive Chairwoman on the company's board of directors.

== Technology ==
Wanderu is an aggregator that allows travelers to find and compare bus, train, and flight options all in the same search. After selecting start and end points and date and time preferences, Wanderu's search engine generates listings which can be filtered by price, duration, and other amenities like access to WiFi. The user is then taken to a booking form where they are able to complete their reservation. In some cases, depending on the bus or train carrier, the user may be redirected to the carrier's website to complete the booking.

== Recognition ==
Wanderu was a finalist of MassChallenge in the summer of 2012 and an original member of PayPal's Start Tank in Boston.

In February 2013, Wanderu won the South by Southwest Accelerator Grand Prize in the Innovative Web Technology category.

In February 2015, Wanderu a top three finalist at Richard Branson’s Extreme Tech Challenge. TIME named the Wanderu app as one of its favorite iPhone apps for the week of February 19, 2015, USA Today named it one of the top budget travel apps of 2015, and CNet called it one of the best apps for booking travel.

In November 2016, Inc. Magazine named Wanderu one of the top 15 companies of 2016.
