= Carpool =

Sharing of car journeys so that more than one person travels in a car

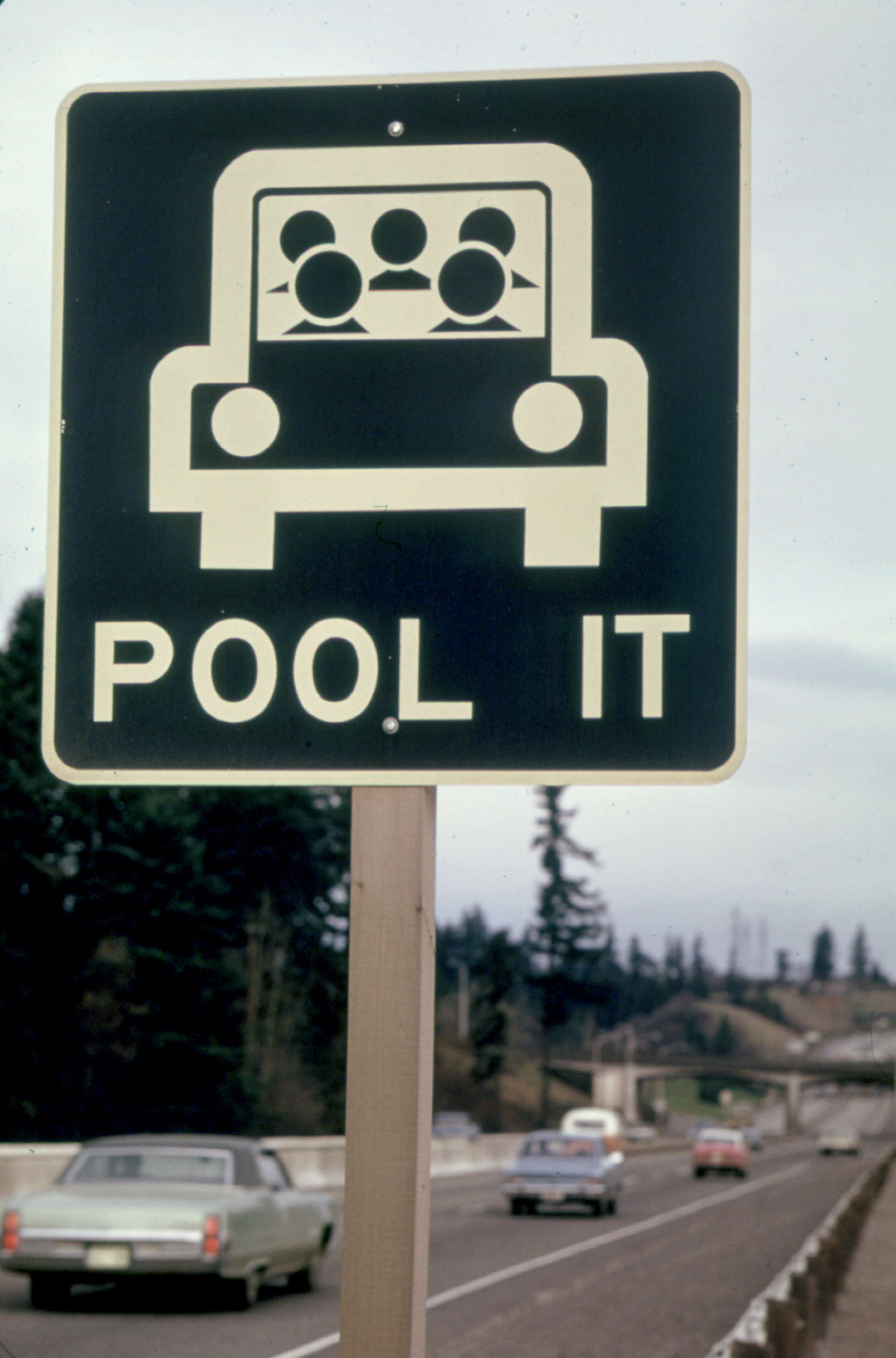
A sign encouraging carpooling during the gas shortage resulting from the 1973 oil crisis

Carpooling is the sharing of car journeys so that more than one person travels in a car, and prevents the need for others to have to drive to a location themselves. Carpooling is considered a Demand-Responsive Transport (DRT) service.

By having more people using one vehicle, carpooling reduces each person's travel costs such as: fuel costs, tolls, and the stress of driving. Carpooling is also a more environmentally friendly and sustainable way to travel as sharing journeys reduces air pollution, carbon emissions, traffic congestion on the roads, and the need for parking spaces.

In 2009, carpooling represented 43.5% of all trips in the United States and 10% of commute trips. As of 2025, approximately 8.5% of US workers carpool to work, while 68.8% commute alone. The majority of carpool commutes (over 60%) are "fam-pools" with family members.

Carpool commuting is more popular for people who work in places with more jobs nearby, and who live in places with higher residential densities. Carpooling is significantly correlated with transport operating costs, including fuel prices and commute length, and with measures of social capital, such as time spent with others, time spent eating and drinking and being unmarried. However, carpooling is significantly less among people who spend more time at work, elderly people, and homeowners.

== Operation ==
Drivers and passengers offer and search for journeys through one of the several mediums available. After finding a match they contact each other to arrange any details for the journey(s). Costs, meeting points and other details like space for luggage are agreed on. They then meet and carry out their shared car journey(s) as planned.

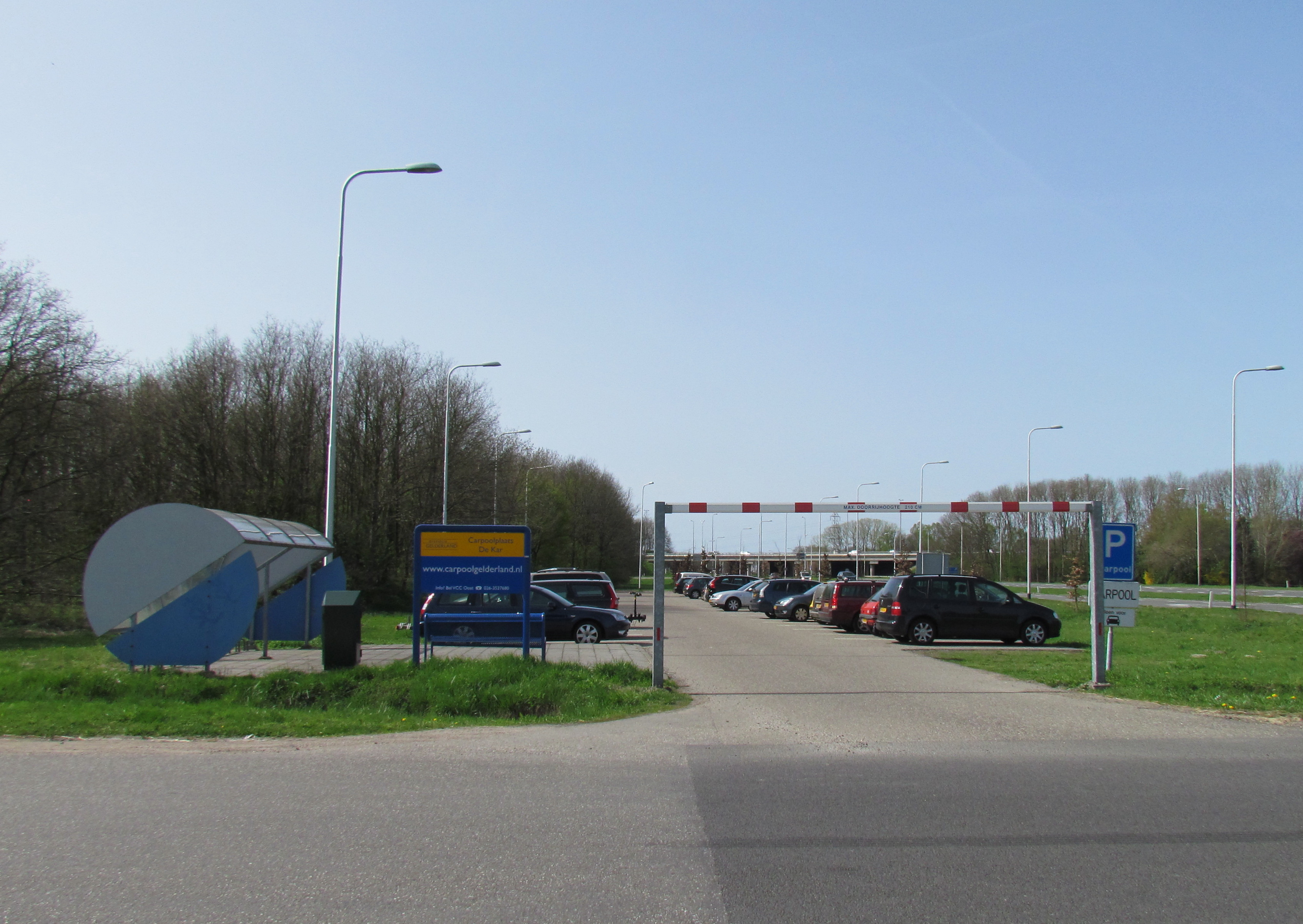
Carpool pick-up place in the Netherlands

Carpooling is commonly implemented for commuting but is increasingly popular for longer one-off journeys, with the formality and regularity of arrangements varying between schemes and journeys.

Carpooling is not always arranged for the whole length of a journey. Especially on long journeys, it is common for passengers to only join for parts of the journey, and give a contribution based on the distance that they travel. This gives carpooling extra flexibility and enables more people to share journeys and save money.

Some carpooling is now organized in online marketplaces or ride-matching websites that allow drivers and passengers to find a travel match and/or make a secured transaction to share the planned travel cost. Like other online marketplaces, they use community-based trust mechanisms, such as user-ratings, to create an optimal experience for users.

Arrangements for carpooling can be made through many different media including public websites, social media, acting as marketplaces, employer websites, smartphone applications, carpooling agencies and pick-up points.

== Initiatives ==
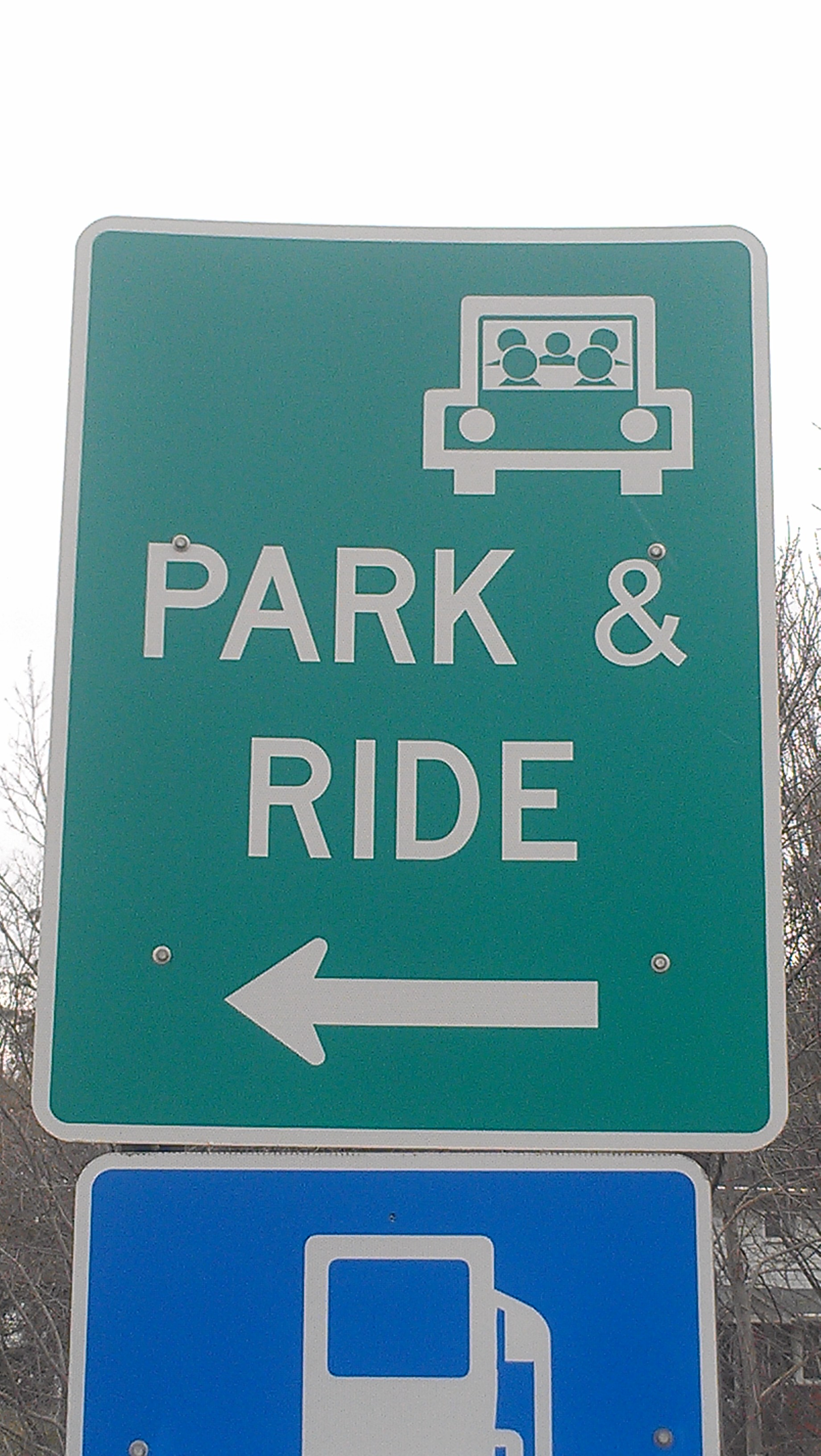
Typical park-and-ride sign in the United States, this one located at the interchange between Interstate 79 and Pennsylvania Route 488 in Portersville, Pennsylvania north of Pittsburgh. Such services are used to encourage carpooling.

Many companies and local authorities have introduced programs to promote carpooling.

In an effort to reduce traffic and encourage carpooling, some governments have introduced high-occupancy vehicle (HOV) lanes in which only vehicles with two or more passengers are allowed to drive. HOV lanes can create strong practical incentives for carpooling by reducing travel time and expense. In some countries, it is common to find parking spaces reserved for carpoolers.

In 2011, an organization called Greenxc created a campaign to encourage others to use this form of transportation in order to reduce their own carbon footprint.

Carpooling, or car sharing as it is called in British English, is promoted by a national UK charity, Carplus, whose mission is to promote responsible car use in order to alleviate financial, environmental and social costs of motoring today, and encourage new approaches to car dependency in the UK. Carplus is supported by Transport for London, the British government initiative to reduce congestion and parking pressure and contribute to relieving the burden on the environment and to the reduction of traffic-related air-pollution, in London.

However, some countries do not encourage carpooling: in Hungary it is a tax crime to carry someone in a car for a cost share (or any payment) unless the driver has a taxi license and there is an invoice issued and taxes are paid. Several people were fined by undercover tax officers during a 2011 crackdown, posing as passengers looking for a ride on carpooling websites. On 19 March 2012 Endre Spaller, a member of the Hungarian Parliament interpellated Zoltán Cséfalvay, Secretary of State for the National Economy, about this practice who replied that carpooling should be endorsed instead of punished, however care must be taken for some people trying to turn it into a way to gain untaxed profit.

== Cost sharing ==
Carpooling usually means to divide the travel expenses equally between all the occupants of the vehicle (driver or passenger). The driver does not try to earn money, but to share with several people the cost of a trip he/she would do anyway. The expenses to be divided basically include the fuel and possible tolls. But if we include in the calculation the depreciation of the vehicle purchase and maintenance, insurance and taxes paid by the driver, we get a cost around $1/mile. There are platforms that facilitate carpooling by connecting people seeking respectively passengers and drivers. Usually there is a fare set up by the car driver and accepted by passengers because they get an agreement before trip start.

The second generation of these platforms is designed to manage urban trips in real time, using the traveler's smartphones. They make possible to occupy the vehicle's empty seats on the fly, collecting and delivering passengers along its entire route (and not only at common points of origin and destination). This system automatically performs an equitable sharing of travel costs, allowing each passenger to reimburse the driver a fair share according to the benefit actually gained by the vehicle usage, proportional to the distance traveled by the passenger and the number of people that shared the car.

== History ==
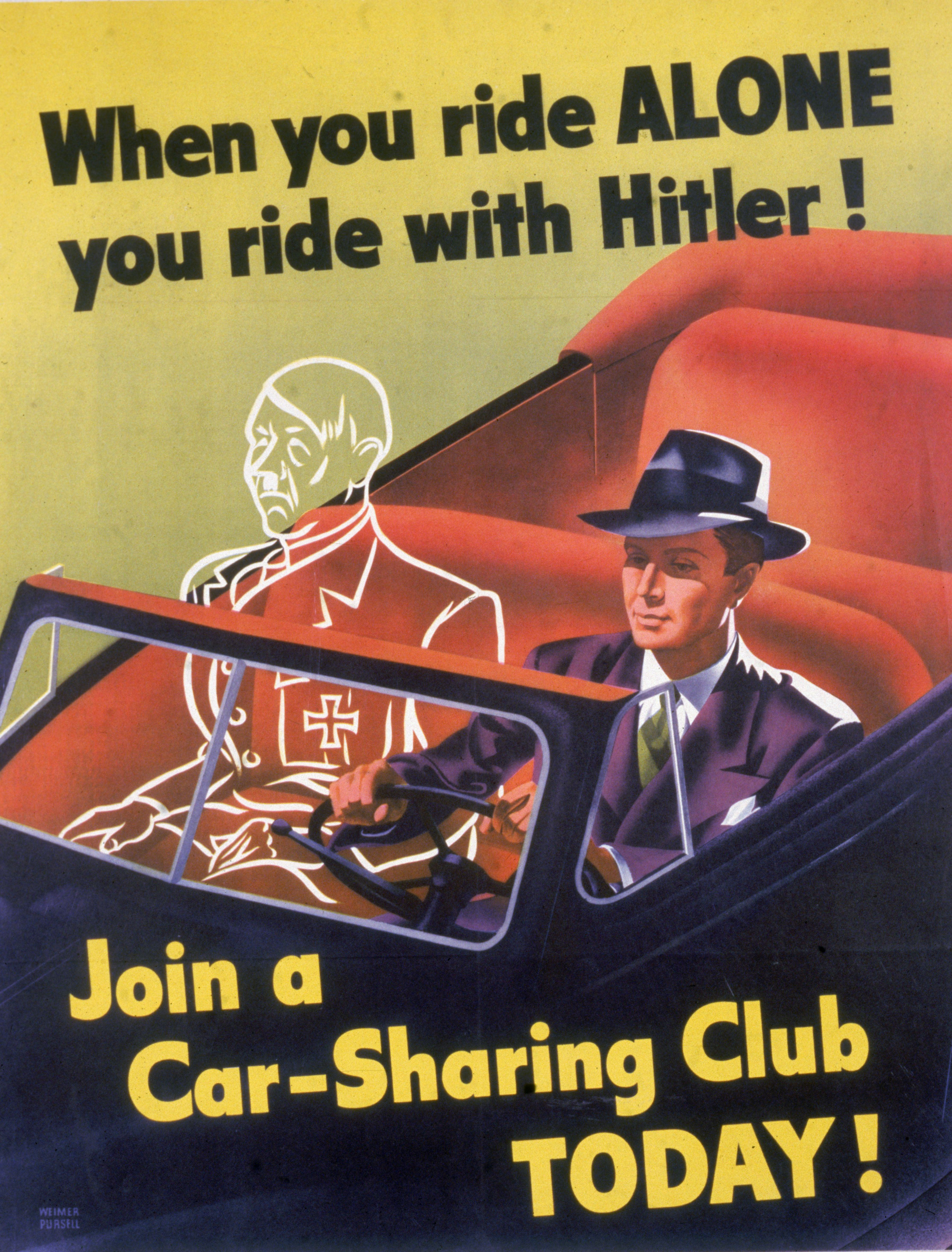
A poster used to promote carpooling in the U.S. as a way to ration gasoline during World War II

Carpooling first became prominent in the United States as a rationing tactic during World War II. Ridesharing began during World War II through "car clubs" or "car-sharing clubs". The US Office of Civilian Defense asked neighborhood councils to encourage four workers to share a ride in one car to conserve rubber for the war effort. It also created a ride sharing program called the Car Sharing Club Exchange and Self-Dispatching System. Carpooling returned in the mid-1970s due to the 1973 oil crisis and the 1979 energy crisis.At that time the first employee vanpools were organized at Chrysler and 3M.

Carpooling declined precipitously between the 1970s and the 2000s, peaking in the US in 1970 with a commute mode share of 20.4%. By 2011 it was down to 9.7%. In large part this has been attributed to the dramatic fall in gas prices (45%) during the 1980s. In the 1990s it was popular among college students, where campuses have limited parking space. Together with Prof. James Davidson from Harvard, Dace Campbell, Ivan Lin and Habib Rached from Washington, and others, began to investigate the feasibility of further development although the comprehensive technologies were not commercially available yet at the time. Their work is considered by many to be a forerunner of carpooling & ridesharing systems technology used by Garrett Camp, Travis Kalanick, Oscar Salazar and Conrad Whelan at Uber.

The character of carpool travel has been shifting from "Dagwood Bumstead" variety, in which each rider is picked up in sequence, to a "park and ride" variety, where all the travelers meet at a common location. Recently, however, the Internet has facilitated growth for carpooling and the commute share mode has grown to 10.7% in 2005. In 2007 with the advent of smart phones and GPS, which became commercially available, John Zimmer and Logan Green, from Cornell University and University of California, Santa Barbara respectively, rediscovered and created carpooling system called Zimride, a precursor to Lyft. The popularity of the Internet and smart phones has greatly helped carpooling to expand, enabling people to offer and find rides thanks to easy-to-use and reliable online transport marketplaces. These websites are commonly used for one-off long-distance journeys with high fuel costs.

In Europe, long-distance car-pooling has become increasingly popular over the past years, thanks to BlaBlaCar. According to its website, as of 2020, Blablacar counted more than 80 million users, across Europe and beyond.

As of March 2020, Uber and Lyft have suspended carpooling services in the U.S. and Canada in efforts to control the COVID-19 pandemic via social distancing.

== Other forms ==
Carpooling exists in other forms:

- Slugging is a form of ad hoc, informal carpooling between strangers. No money changes hands, but a mutual benefit still exists between the driver and passenger(s) making the practice worthwhile.
- Flexible carpooling expands the idea of ad hoc carpooling by designating formal locations for travelers to join carpools.
- Ridesharing companies allow people to arrange ad hoc rides on very short notice, through the use of smartphone applications or the internet. Passengers are simply picked up at their current location.
- Carpool lines (as if you were taking the bus; this model differs from High-Occupancy Vehicle (HOV) lanes which prioritize vehicles with multiple occupants but do not provide structured matching or fixed boarding points for passengers)

In several European countries, particularly in France and Switzerland, structured carpooling networks (sometimes referred to as carpool lines or organized carpooling) have been developed as a complement to public transport systems. Unlike traditional carpooling, which relies on pre-arranged agreements between individuals or on digital matching platforms, structured carpooling networks operate along predefined routes with designated stops, similar to bus lines. These systems aim to:

- reduce single-occupancy vehicle use;
- provide mobility options in peri-urban and rural areas with limited public transport.

== Challenges ==
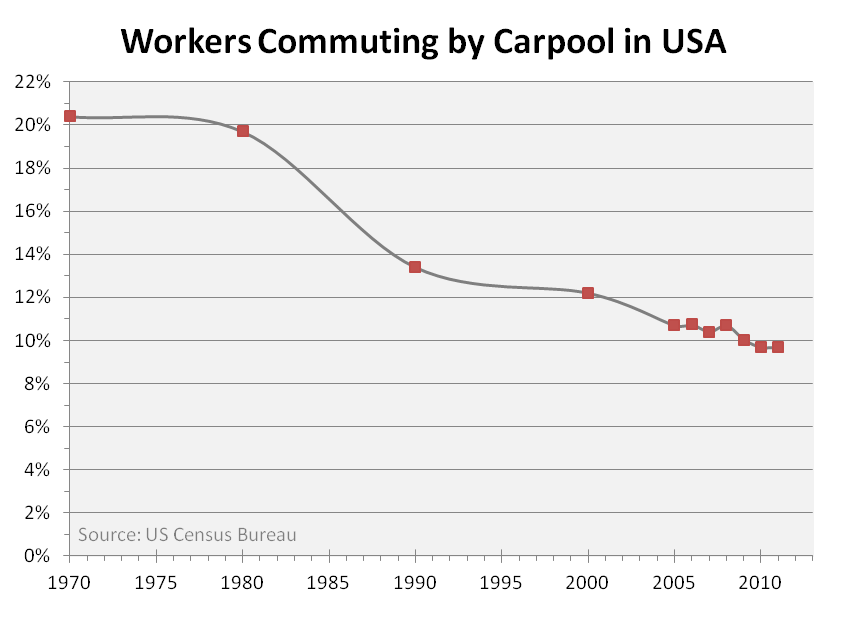
The share of US workers commuting by carpool has declined from 20.4% in 1970 to just 9.7% in 2011.

- Flexibility - Carpooling can struggle to be flexible enough to accommodate in route stops or changes to working times/patterns. One survey identified this as the most common reason for not carpooling. To counter this some schemes offer 'sweeper services' with later running options, or a 'guaranteed ride home' arrangement with a local taxi company.
- Reliability - If a carpooling network lacks a "critical mass" of participants, it may be difficult to find a match for certain trips. The parties may not necessarily follow through on the agreed-upon ride. Several internet carpooling marketplaces are addressing this concern by implementing online paid passenger reservation, billed even if passengers do not turn up.
- Riding with strangers - Concerns over security have been an obstacle to sharing a vehicle with strangers, though in reality the risk of crime is small. One remedy used by internet carpooling schemes is reputation systems that flag problematic users and allow responsible users to build up trust capital, such systems greatly increase the value of the website for the user community.
- Overall efficacy - Though carpooling is officially sanctioned by most governments, including construction of lanes specifically allocated for car-pooling, some doubts remain as to the overall efficacy of carpool lanes. As an example, many car-pool lanes, or lanes restricted to car-pools during peak traffic hours, are seldom occupied by car-pools in the traditional sense. Instead, these lanes are often empty, leading to an overall net increase in fuel consumption as freeway capacity is possibly contracted, forcing the solo-occupied cars to travel slower, leading to reduced fuel efficiency.
- In 2012, the Queensland government announced it would end carpool lanes (known as Transit Lanes) claiming they were creating congestion and delays. The move was supported by the RACQ motoring group.
- No carpooling service provides the ability for drivers to declare the time range during which they provide services in advance. Although the majority of carpooling services use a mobile application, this is not the case for interurban carpooling services (i.e., Ride joy and Autostrade carpooling) . In addition, no carpooling was found to guarantee a minimum delay for drivers or a single dropoff/pickup point. Some carpooling platforms (i.e., TwoGo and BlaBlaLines operated by BlablaCar) use an intelligent technology to analyze rides from all users to find the best fit for each user. This intelligent technology even factors in real-time traffic data to calculate precise routes and arrival times.

== In popular culture ==
- In the 1970s, the US Department of Transportation released a humorous, animated public service announcement to promote carpooling entitled "Kalaka." In the commercial, an interviewer is shown talking to Noah, "the original share-the-ride-with-a-friend man." Noah explains that carpooling is an economical way to get where you're going, but back in his time it was known as "kalaka."
- Cabbing All the Way is a book written by author Jatin Kuberkar that narrates a success story of a carpool with twelve people on board. Based in the city of Hyderabad, India, the book is a real life narration and highlights the potential benefits of having a carpool.
- The 2017 smartphone game Crazy Taxi Tycoon (formerly titled Crazy Taxi Gazillionaire) antagonizes ride-sharing as a threat to taxi business, as it becomes a powerful megacorporation that rips off those whom it serves. The player is tasked in hiring taxi drivers to establish a taxi service that offers a more legitimate, friendly and reliable transport experience.
- Carpool Karaoke, best known as a recurring segment from The Late Late Show with James Corden.

== See also ==
- Flight sharing
- Fuel tax
- Hitchhiking
- Public transportation
- Ridesharing company
- Rota (schedule)
- Shared transport
- Slugging
- Sustainable transportation
- Traditional car sharing and peer-to-peer carsharing
- Vanpool
- When You Ride Alone You Ride with bin Laden
