= Trailways of New York =

Privately held transportation company

- Founded: 1926; 100 years ago
- Headquarters: 499-507 Hurley Avenue; Hurley, New York 12443
- Service type: Intercity coach service Bus charter Airport shuttle Motorcoach tours Commuter service
- Alliance: Trailways Transportation System, Megabus
- Destinations: 100+
- Fleet: 130+
- Chief executive: Eugene J. Berardi Jr
- Website: www.trailways.com

Trailways of New York is one of the largest privately held transportation companies based in New York State. It employs over 450 people and carries passengers more than 80 million miles annually.

TrailwaysNY, as it is known, operates over 150 trips per day to more than 140 destinations in New York, New Jersey, and Canada. It is the largest and longest continuously operating intercity bus carrier in New York State, an interline partner with Megabus, and a member of the National Trailways Network.

== History ==
Founded in 1926 by the Van Gonsic Berardi family, Trailways of New York first began as the Rip Van Winkle brand with commuter service between New York City and the Hudson Valley. During the 1930s, following a series of early successes in the then newly-emerging bus industry, service was first extended from its original Hudson Valley and Metro New York home into the Adirondacks.

Over time, Trailways of New York's holdings grew to include the Dixie Bus Center in New York City, the Pine Hill-Kingston Bus Corporation, and other properties.

Expansion came yet again in the 1990s, marking the companies' largest growth since the first half of the 20th century. During this time service was expanded to include Long Island and the nearby Canadian cities of Montreal, Quebec and Toronto, Ontario. A long term revenue sharing partnership was also established with Greyhound Bus Lines to provide enhanced service and reliability to the customers of both brands.

Affiliated with the Trailways Transportation System, Trailways of New York also offers connections with Academy Bus, Fullington Trailways, Greyhound Lines, Martz Trailways, Barons Bus Lines, Bieber Transportation Group, Short Line (bus company) (Coach USA), Lakefront Lines, and Peter Pan Bus Lines.

Trailways of New York once owned the Central Union Bus Terminal, also known as the Dixie Bus Center, which opened in April 1930 in what was then the Dixie Hotel in New York City. At the time, it was the largest enclosed bus station in New York. Buses entered next to the hotel’s entrance on West 43rd and proceeded underground, where they would rotate on a 35-foot turntable, then proceed into a designated berth. A waiting room for passengers was off to one side. Unable to compete with Port Authority Bus Terminal, which opened in 1950, the Hotel Dixie’s bus terminal closed in 1957. Today, the underground space is a parking garage and the hotel is now the Carter Hotel; the original turntable and waiting room floor are still visible.

Trailways of New York has been a chief “front of shirt” sponsor of the Kingston Stockade Football Club since its inception in 2015 and runs special “fan buses” to away games. The Kingston Stockade FC, a franchise in the National Premier Soccer League, plays its home games at Dietz Stadium in Kingston, NY and was founded by FourSquare CEO Dennis Crowley.

In 2022, Trailways of New York ended its partnership with Greyhound and started one with Megabus.

=== Bus theft ===
In 2010, Darius McCollum was caught behind the wheel of a stolen Trailways NY bus en route to Kennedy Airport. McCollum is best known for his theft of "an E Train filled with passengers from 34th Street to The World Trade Center" when he was only 15 years old. This theft marked McCollum's 27th arrest for a transit related crime. For the theft, he was sentenced to 2½ to 5 years in prison.

== Brands ==
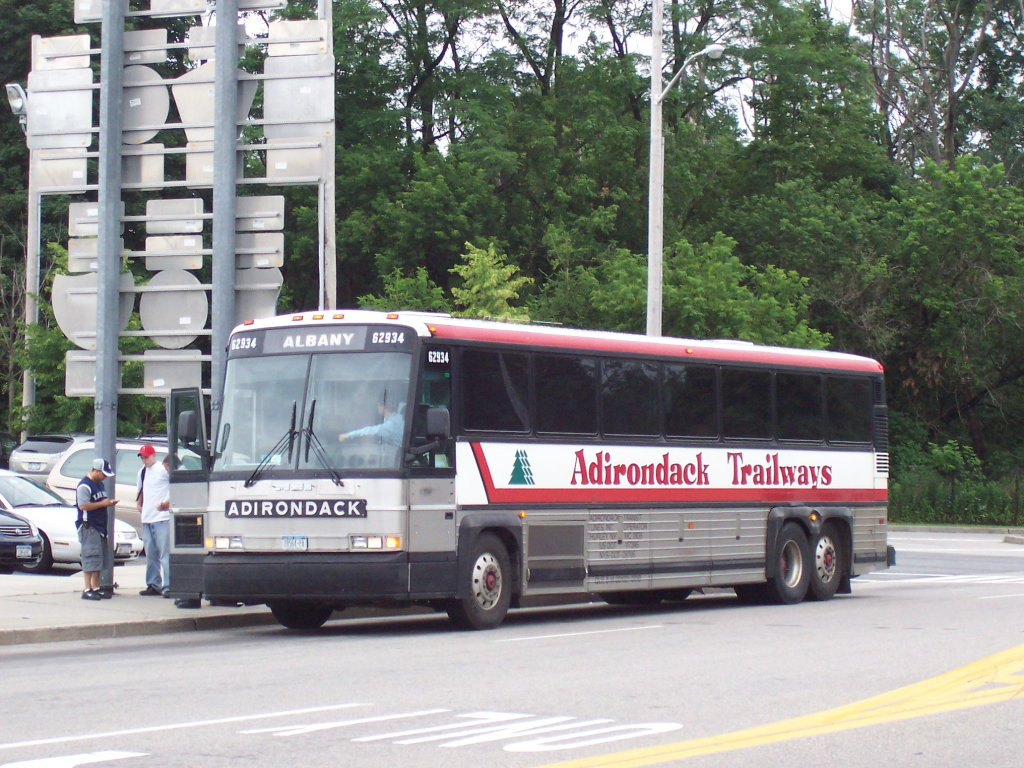
A now-retired MCI 102-B3 Adirondack Trailways coach in Nanuet, New York

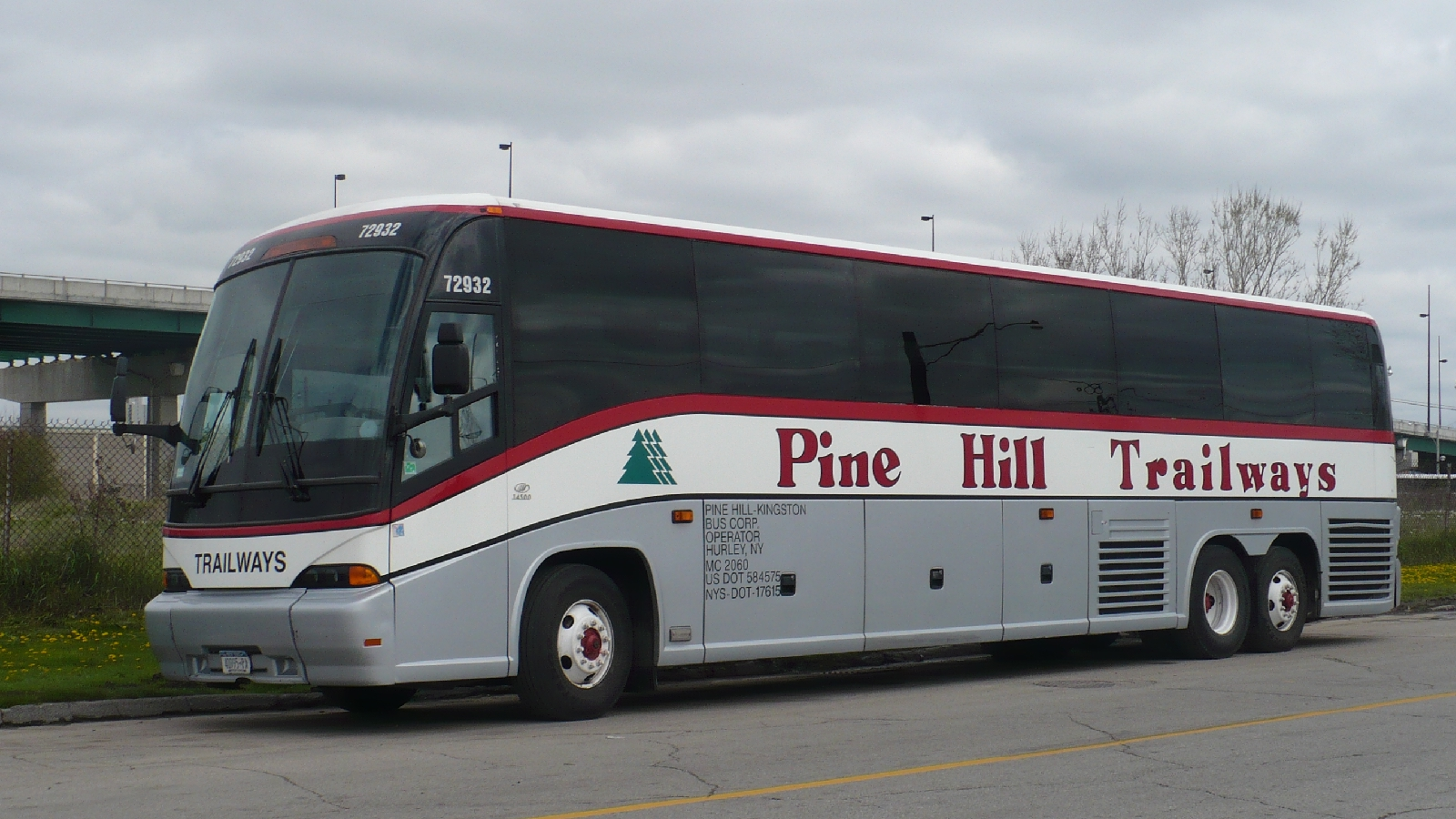
A now-retired Pine Hill Trailways MCI J4500 coach

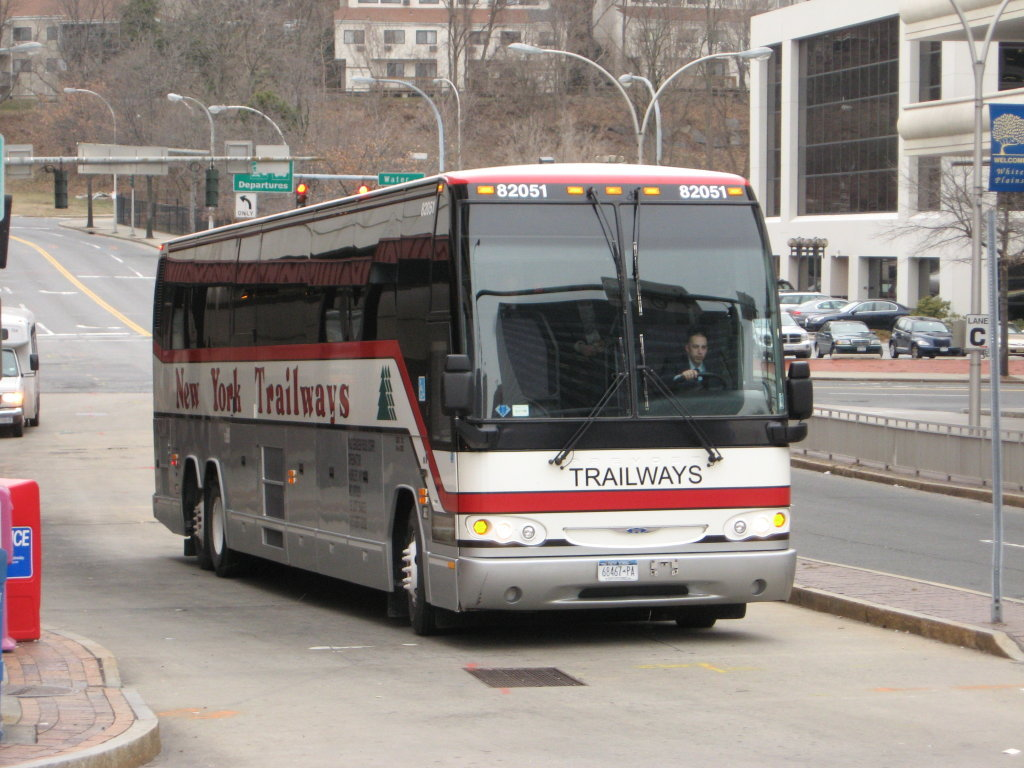
A New York Trailways Prevost H3-45 coach in White Plains, New York

Trailways of New York operates under several brands: Adirondack Trailways, Pine Hill Trailways, New York Trailways, and LINE.

=== Adirondack Trailways ===
Adirondack Trailways is the brand used by Adirondack Transit Lines, Inc. The following routes are operated by Adirondack Trailways: New York-Kingston-Albany-Glens Falls-Montreal, Babylon-Kingston, Newburgh-Kingston, Kingston-Saugerties-Oneonta, Binghamton-Oneonta-Albany, Albany-Utica-Syracuse, Albany-Gloversville, Glens Falls-Warrensburg-Massena, and Syracuse-Canton-Massena.

=== Pine Hill Trailways ===
Pine Hill Trailways is the brand used by Pine Hill-Kingston Bus Corporation. The following route is operated by Pine Hill Trailways: New York-Kingston-Phoenicia-Oneonta-Utica.

=== New York Trailways ===
New York Trailways is the brand used by Passenger Bus Corporation. The following routes are operated by New York Trailways: New York-Binghamton-Syracuse-Rochester-Buffalo, Binghamton-Ithaca-Rochester, Binghamton-Elmira-Rochester, Elmira-Ithaca-Syracuse, and Syracuse-Canton-Massena. Many of these and other services had previously been operated by Western New York Motor Lines, Inc., which operated under the brand Empire Trailways, prior to their sale to Trailways of New York.

=== LINE ===
In August 2018, Trailways of New York launched its brand LINE, a “business class” route running between midtown Manhattan, the Hudson Valley, and the Catskills. The service offers mobile ticketing, an on-board attendant, complimentary snacks and beverages, and a complimentary premium WiFi system that enables video and audio entertainment streaming. As of its launch, LINE stops included West 31st Street in Manhattan and the New York state towns of New Paltz, Kingston, Woodstock, Phoenicia, and Hunter.

== Amtrak partnership ==
In August 2018, Amtrak announced a partnership with Trailways of New York that will allow passengers, using one ticket, to connect from the railway stations at Rochester, Syracuse, Utica, and Saratoga Springs onto buses to upstate New York cities such as Cooperstown, Ithaca, Cortland, Glens Falls, Oneonta, and Lake George.

== Fleet ==
Trailways of New York utilizes the following models in its fleet:

- Motor Coach Industries D4505
- Prevost H3-45 and X3-45
- Van Hool C2045 and CX45

There are no more J4500 in service, and there are only 3 D4500 left in service at this time. Trailways of New York has been buying Prevost X3-45 exclusively since 2020.

== Charter Operations and Seneca Niagara Casino Shuttle ==
In addition to the aforementioned line service Trailways offers, charter services are offered at both the Rochester and Kingston offices and bus service from Rochester, New York to the Seneca Niagara Casino in Niagara Falls, New York via Rochester, Irondequoit, LeRoy, and Batavia are offered.

== See also ==
- Greyhound Lines, a competing and interline carrier throughout New York State
- Short Line Bus, a competing and interline carrier in the Southern Tier region
- Wanderu (company), a bus ticket search engine
