= Kangaride =

Canadian carpooling company

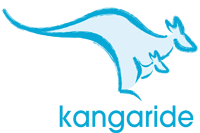
- Company type: Rideshare
- Industry: Service
- Founded: 2006
- Headquarters: Montreal, Quebec, Canada
- Key people: Marc-Olivier Vachon, Founder, CEO
- Products: Rideshare
- Website: www.kangaride.com

Kangaride is a private Canadian company founded in 2006 that provides a carpooling platform for posting and booking long-distance rides in North America.

== History ==
Kangaride was created by Marc-Olivier Vachon in 2006. The company had 7,000 members in its first year of activity, and over 33,000 members as of 2009. Kangaride appeared on Dragons Den Season 7 episode 19.

== Description ==
Through Kangaride’s website, drivers and passengers connect to carpool together. Drivers post their rides and the empty seats in their vehicle, and passengers search for rides and book a seat in the one that gets them where they need to go. Kangaride has over 475,000 members and hundreds of rides booked each week.

Kangaride has a three-pronged approach to making carpooling safer. All rides are rated by the driver and passengers and drivers’ overall ratings are visible to passengers before booking.

Kangaride is considered much safer than other carpooling services because a background check is performed on all drivers to ensure they have a valid drivers license.

Kangaride operates as Amigo Express in French.
