= MCI D-Series =

American motorcoach bus type

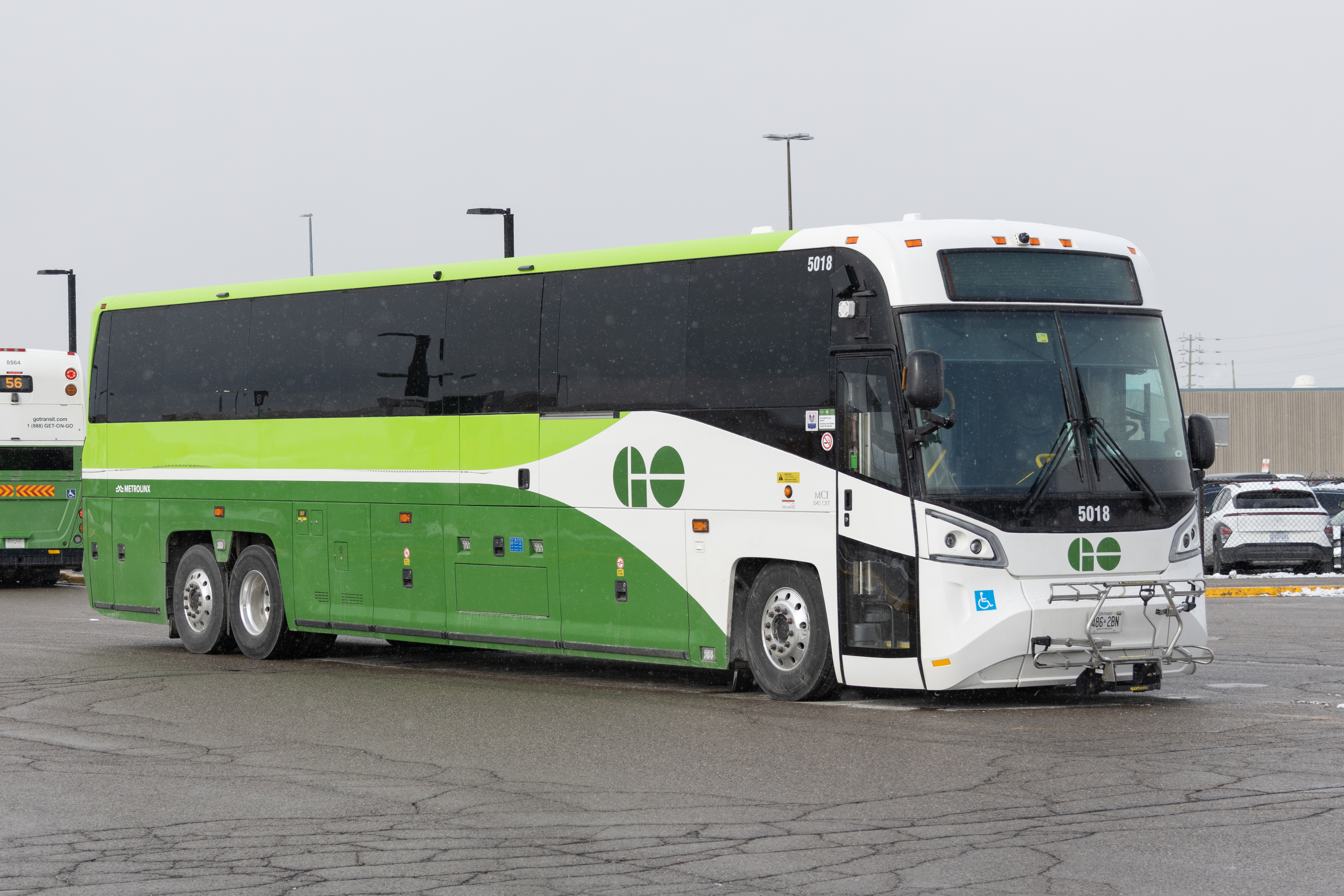
- GO Transit MCI D45 CRT

Overview
- Manufacturer: Motor Coach Industries
- Also called: Intercity Cruiser; Commuter Cruiser; Classic American Coach
- Production: 1992-present
- Assembly: United States: Crookston, Minnesota; Pembina, North Dakota

Body and chassis
- Class: Tri-axle coach
- Body style: Single-decker coach
- Doors: 1 or 2 with optional wheelchair lift door
- Floor type: High-floor
- Chassis: MCI special platform integral

Powertrain
- Engine: Detroit Diesel Series 60, Caterpillar C10, Caterpillar 3176B, Caterpillar C12, Caterpillar C13, Cummins M11, Cummins ISL, Cummins ISM, Cummins ISX, battery-electric bus
- Capacity: 40-foot models: 38-53; 45-foot models: 50-61

Dimensions
- Length: 40 feet (12.2 m); 45 feet (13.7 m)
- Width: 102 inches (2.6 m)
- Height: 137 inches (3.5 m); 141 inches (3.6 m) (NextGen)
- Curb weight: 35,100 lb (15,900 kg), GVWR 44,400 lb (20,100 kg) or 48,000 lb (22,000 kg)

Chronology
- Predecessor: MCI MC-12; MCI B-Series; MCI C-Series; MCI G-Series

The MCI D-Series is a model of motorcoach bus produced by Motor Coach Industries (MCI). The bus is primarily used by private companies operating scheduled service or commuter buses, government agencies for the transport of prisoners, and in more recent years, public transit agencies who use them on express routes. It is sold alongside the MCI J-Series bus, primarily used by tour and charter operators.

The D-Series was introduced in February 1992 as MCI's first 45-foot (13.7 m) motorcoach, enabled by a December 1991 law change that allowed the additional length. The coach replaced the B- and C-Series models, which were equipped with obsolete two-stroke engines.

== History ==
=== Background and development ===
Several changes in the industry in the late 1980s and early 1990s led to the development of the D-Series coach. First, was the growing calls to allow 45 ft coaches (at the time prohibited by US law), second was that MCI's existing models were designed to use two-stroke engines and the company was looking to offer the new Detroit Diesel Series 60 four-stroke engines, and third was 1988 Canadian government request to develop a wheelchair accessible intercity bus.

MCI developed two prototypes to test the various proposed changes. In 1989, the company stretched an existing 102-C3 model to 45 feet (14 m) and in May 1990, in partnership with the Canadian government, MCI built a wheelchair accessible bus with a wheelchair lift and an accessible bathroom.

=== Introduction and deployment ===
On December 18, 1991, the Intermodal Surface Transportation Efficiency Act was signed into law, allowing an increase of coach length to 45-feet. The earlier prototypes left MCI ready for the change. Less than three months later, at February 1992 UBOA Bus Expo, MCI introduced the 102-DL3. The model number represented its 102 in (2.6 m) width, D for its model, L for long (45 feet) and 3 for three axles. MCI also offered the wheelchair lift and accessible lavatory as an option. Production of the coach started in late 1992. The bus was quickly adopted by private companies operating scheduled service (like Greyhound Lines) or commuter buses.

A 40-foot (12 m) version of the D-Series, the 102-D3 was introduced in January 1994, replacing the B and C-Series models in the MCI product line.

At about the same time that the 102-D3 was introduced, MCI also started offering an ISTV (Inmate Security Transportation Vehicle) a prisoner transport vehicle version of the coach. ISTV models are designed to transport up to 69 inmates and are available with containment cells and a rear officer position. The ISTV only comes in a 40-foot version which better fits existing sally ports at jail and prison facilities.

In 1998, MCI introduced a more upscale companion coach model known as the E-Series, designed for tour and charter operators. It was supplemented and later replaced by the current J-Series.

Over time, the D-Series also became popular with public transit agencies who use them on express routes that travel long distances on highways. Responding to transit agency requests, MCI started offering optional destination signs and two-piece sliding entry doors better suited to curbside loading compared to the one-piece swing out door. The motorcoach allows operators to have more seated passengers, which is preferred when operating at higher speeds for longer distances. The downside compared to a traditional low-floor transit bus is that motorcoaches only have one door and a high-floor that requires the use of a wheelchair lift, slowing boarding/alighting.

=== NextGen models ===
To address these problems, in 2017, MCI debuted a new version of the D-Series with a low-floor area in the middle of the coach. This area allows passengers using wheelchairs to board much faster than using a ramp, and provides a second door to allow passengers to board and alight at the same time. The trade-off was that the luggage space under the coach was largely eliminated, but few public transit operators used that space in normal operation. MCI named the coach the D45 CRT LE for commuter rapid transit, low entry. Because of the extensive changes necessary to the coach, MCI used the development of the D45 CRT LE as an opportunity to develop a second generation of the D-Series coach with new styling and updated systems and components. Those updates began appearing on high-floor coach models beginning in 2020.

Between 2020 and 2022, MCI began to replace more of Legacy models with new models based on the D45 CRT LE. The D45 CRT, a transit coach similar to the D45 CRT LE but with a traditional wheelchair lift instead of the low entry section, the D4520, an intercity coach designed to replace the D4505 and the D4020 ISTV, a new 40 foot prisoner transport coach replacing the D4000ISTV. Prototype 40 foot versions of the new commuter and intercity coaches were constructed, but none have been ordered and are not publicly offered as of 2024. The last legacy D-Series models were produced in 2022 and subsequently discontinued.

In 2022, MCI added a D-Series production line to the NFI group factory in Crookston, Minnesota due to the planned and later canceled closure of the Pembina plant.

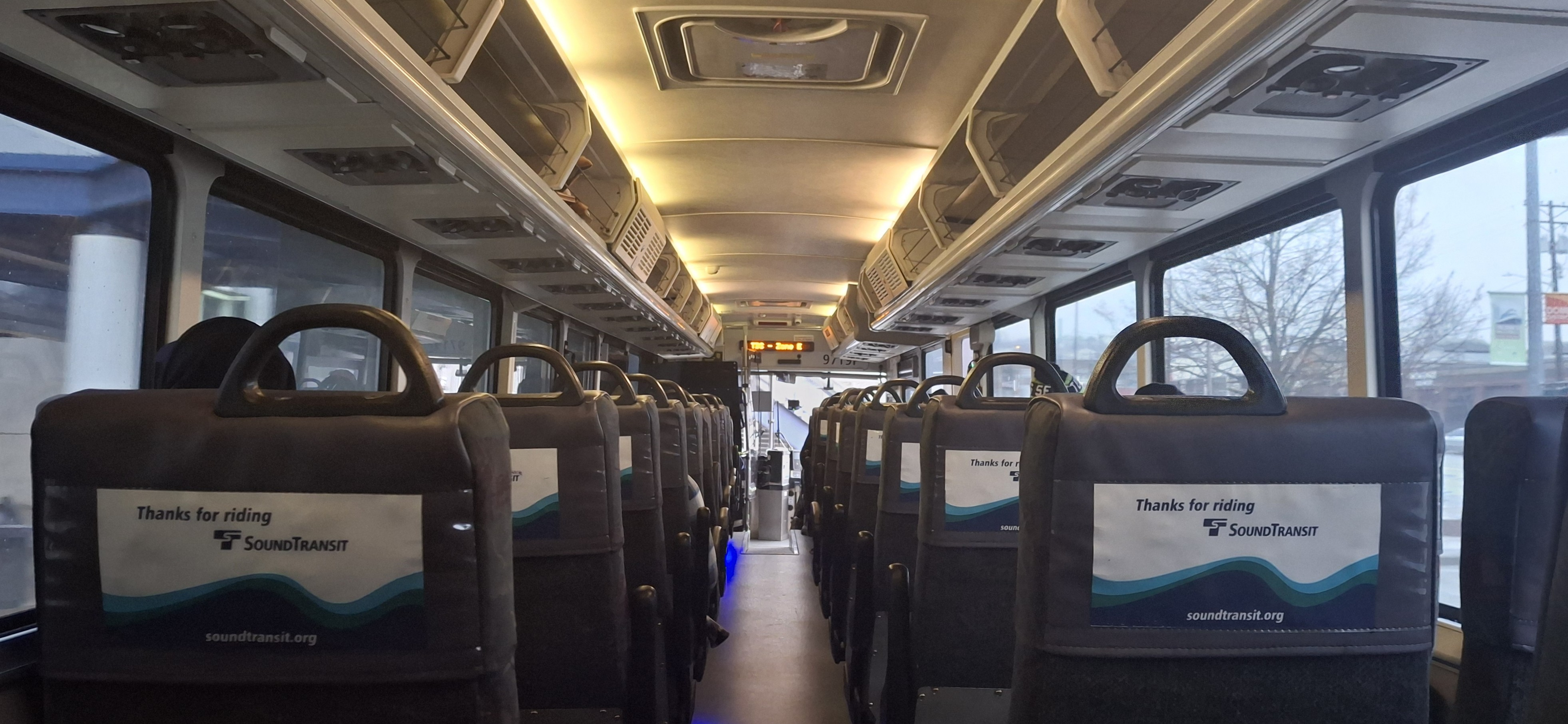
Interior view of a Sound Transit D-Series coach

== Variants ==
=== First generation (Legacy) ===
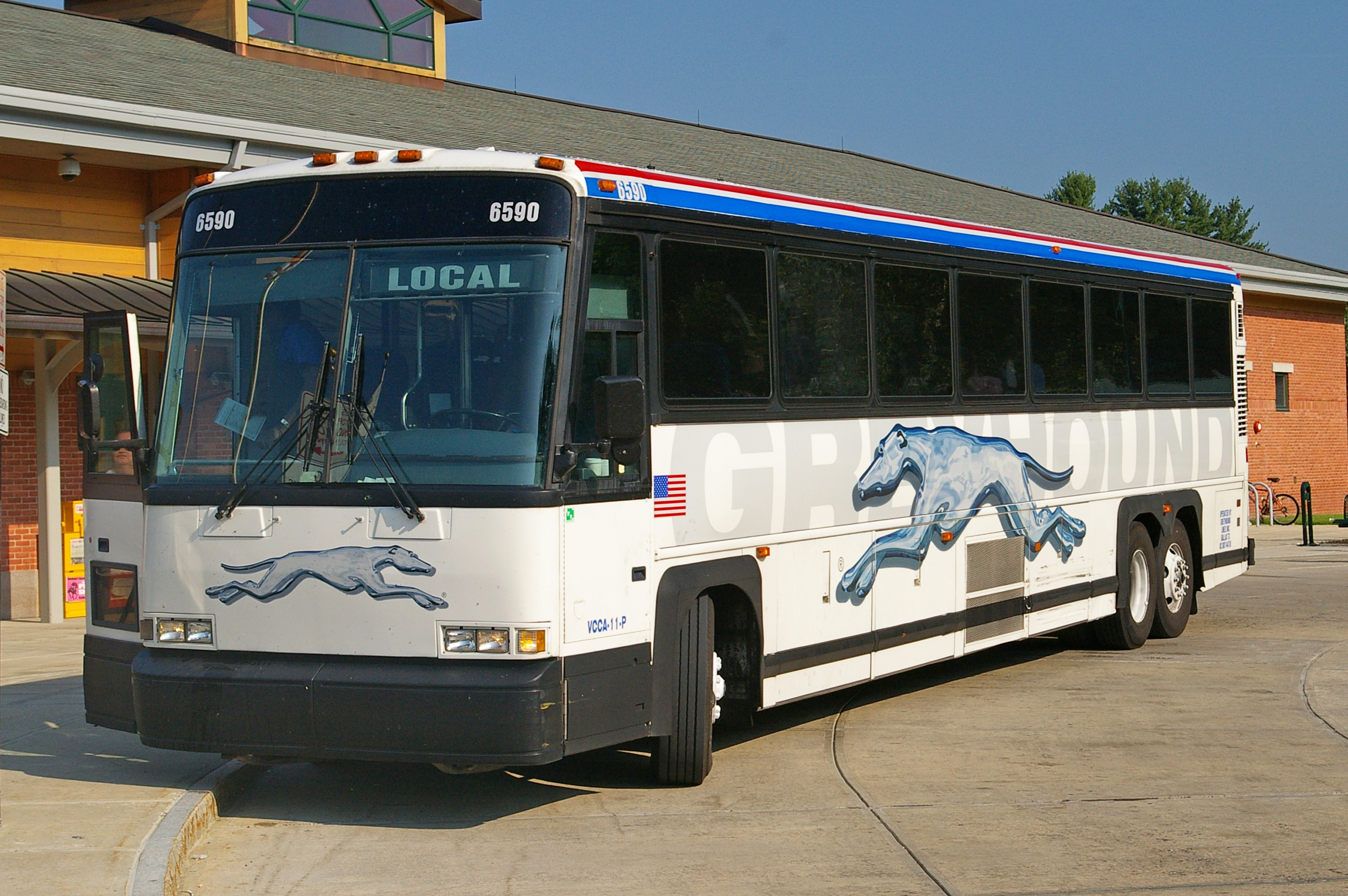
102 DL3 of Greyhound Lines

The 102-D3 and 102-DL3, entered production in 1994 and 1992 respectively. The model number denoted the width (102 inches (2.6 m), exclusive of mirrors), "D" model, the "L" in the model name designates longer length (45 feet (14 m), nominally), and 3-axle configuration. The models have large, fender skirts and a rear-mounted radiator fan side-by-side with the intercooler fan. It has an air intake covered by a large grille, a two-piece engine door, small headlight/taillights, and a black roof cap. The models are also available with optional stainless steel front and/or sides as well as an optional rubber front bumper.

The 102-D3 and 102-DL3 were renamed D4000 and D4500 in 2001. In 2005, MCI started offering a facelifted model of the D-Series called the D4005 and D4505 to private-sector operators. The rear end cap design was updated in 2007 to accommodate new engines that met stricter EPA emissions regulations.

Commuter coach models were offered with a large destination sign above the front windows and bi-fold doors. A prison transport coach version of the 40 ft model was also offered, and continues to be offered as the D4000 ISTV.

Model	Photo	Introduced	Discontinued	Notes
45-foot (14 m) Models
102-DL3/D4500		1992	2005	Models with wheelchair lifts designated 102-DLW3.; Models with lower stainless steel fluting on the front and/or sides adds an "SS" designation to the end. Example: 102-DL3SS.; Renamed from 102-DL3 to D4500 in 2001.
D4500CL		2005	2007	Updated version of the D4500, with the same front fascia.
D4500CT	(original headlights)	2005	2022	Updated version of the D4500; Received an overhaul in 2014; CNG model (designated D4500CT CNG) offered 2014.; Hybrid model (designated D4500CTH) offered since 2008.; Replaced by D45 CRT models.
D4500CT	(optional updated headlights)	2005	2022	Updated version of the D4500; Received an overhaul in 2014; CNG model (designated D4500CT CNG) offered 2014.; Hybrid model (designated D4500CTH) offered since 2008.; Replaced by D45 CRT models.
D4505	(original headlights)	2005	2022	Mechanically similar to the D4500 but facelifted with the front end developed for G-Series.; Received an overhaul in 2014; Replaced by D4520.
D4505	(optional updated headlights)	2005	2022	Mechanically similar to the D4500 but facelifted with the front end developed for G-Series.; Received an overhaul in 2014; Replaced by D4520.
40-foot (12 m) Models
102-D3/D4000		1994	2005	Models with wheelchair lifts designated 102-DW3.; Models with lower stainless steel fluting on the front and/or sides adds an "SS" designation to the end. Example: 102-D3SS.; CNG model (designated 102-DWA3 CNG) was offered exclusively for the 1999–2000 model years; Renamed from 102-D3 to D4000 in 2001.; Hybrid model (designated D4000H) and 96-inch (2.4 m) wide model (designated D4000N) were offered exclusively for the 2002 model year.
D4000CL		2006	2022	Updated version of the D4000, with the same front and rear fascias.; To be replaced by future D40 CRT.
D4000CT		2006	2022	Updated version of the D4000; CNG model (designated D4000CT CNG) offered since 2010.; To be replaced by future D40 CRT.
D4000 ISTV		2001	2022	Inmate Security Transportation Vehicle, designed for transporting up to 69 inmates and is available with containment cells and a rear officer position.; Replaced by D4020 ISTV.
D4005		2005	2022	Mechanically similar to the D4000 but facelifted with the front end developed for G-Series.; To be replaced by future D4020.

=== Second generation (NextGen) ===
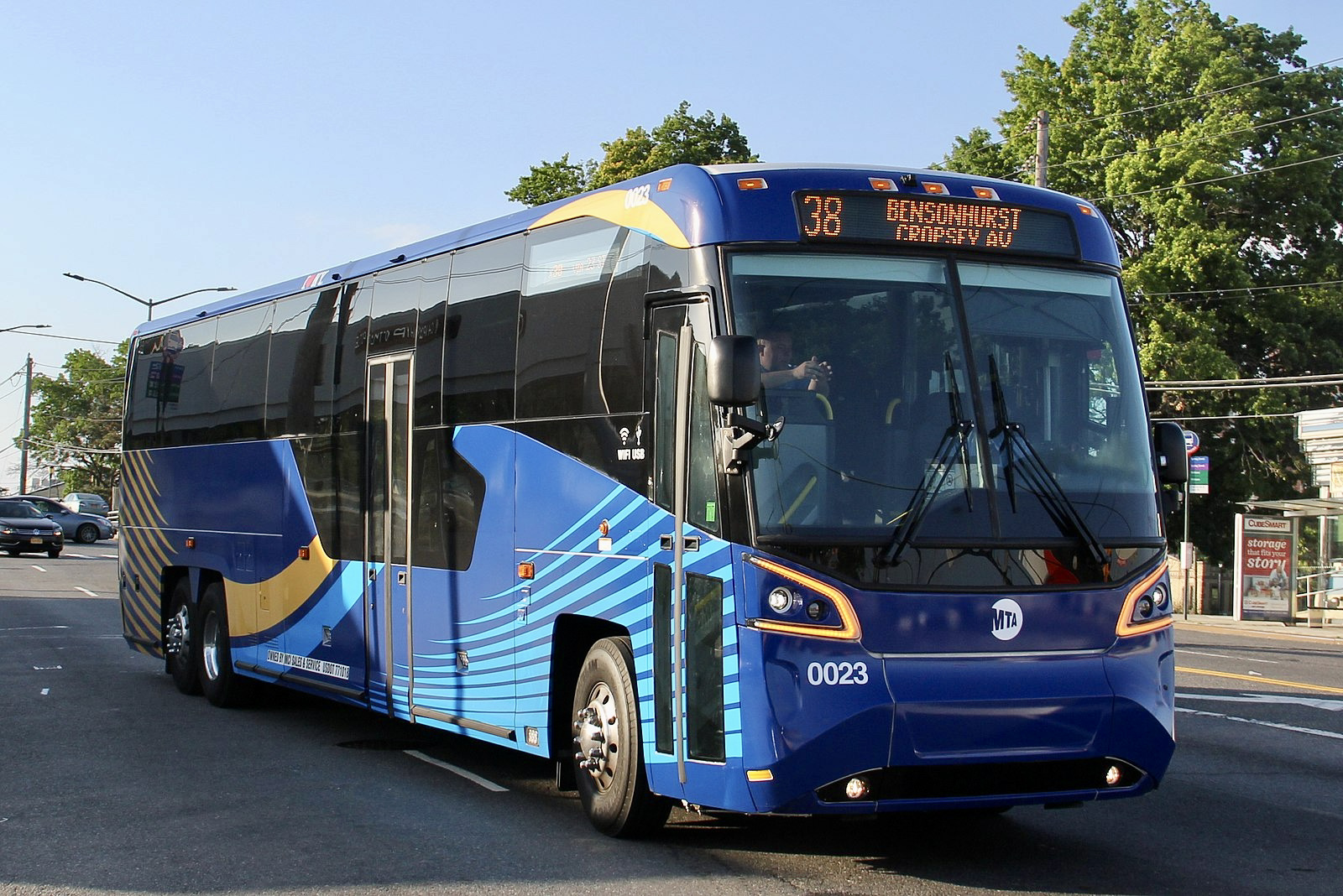
MCI D45 CRT LE of Metropolitan Transportation Authority It features a second door and a unique lower vestibule to simplify wheelchair access.

The D45 CRT, D45 CRT LE and, D4520 coaches make up the next generation of D-Series coaches, which have a taller body based on the J-Series coach with cosmetic updates. The commuter coach models ditch MCI's traditional alphanumerical naming system and are instead named using a modified alphanumerical naming system. For example" "D" for generation or basic model, "45" for the length, "CRT" for "commuter rapid transit" and "LE" for modes with the Low Entry door. The intercity coach model, the D4520, retains MCI's traditional alphanumerical naming system, with "20", denoting the NextGen D-Series.

Model	Photo	Introduced	Notes
45-foot (14 m) Models
D45 CRT LE		2017	Replaced D4500; Commuter coach with low-entry area and wheelchair ramp; Electric version (designated D45 CRT LE CHARGE) offered
D45 CRT		2020	Commuter coach with wheelchair lift; Replaced D4500; Electric version (designated D45 CRT CHARGE) offered
D4520		2020	Intercity coach; Replaced D4505
40-foot (12 m) Models
D40 CRT		(future)	Commuter coach with wheelchair lift; To replace D4000
D4020		(future)	Intercity coach; To replace D4005
D4020 ISTV		2022	Inmate Security Transportation Vehicle; Replaced D4000 ISTV

== See also ==
- MCI J-Series
