= Carpool line =

A carpool line is a hybrid form of transport that combines elements of carpooling with features of a public transport line. It is particularly suited to areas with medium to low population density.

== Definition ==
A carpooling line is a specific type of carpooling service designed to connect as many drivers and passengers as possible along a given route (such as a highway or a major metropolitan/local road). It can be seen as a hybrid of hitchhiking and regular public transport. According to a brochure issued by the French Ministry of Ecology, a carpooling line is like a regular collective transport line, except that available seats are offered by passing private cars each day.

== Required infrastructure ==
For a carpooling line to function effectively, at a minimum, it needs:

- Stops, similar to bus stops, where drivers and passengers can meet. These are particularly important near the beginning of the route to facilitate user connections.
- Interactive infrastructure, either digital (such as a mobile app enabling real-time matching) or physical (such as variable message signs displaying passenger destinations to passing drivers, similar to a hitchhiker’s sign).

In more advanced setups, the system may include specific services — for example, a taxi substitute service for passengers if a driver cannot be found, or financial incentives for drivers to participate even if they do not find a passenger.

== Examples in France and in Switzerland ==
Several companies in Europe are developing this type of service. In France, firms such as fr:Ecov and illicov specialize in carpooling lines, while in Switzerland the concept is offered by the company Taxito.

Carpool lines are gradually expanding in France. Local authorities have implemented the concept — for example, in the Grand Périgueux area. and in the Porte de l’Isère agglomeration near Lyon.
