= Máriakálnok =

Máriakálnok Gahling
- Flag Coat of arms

- Location of Győr-Moson-Sopron county in Hungary

- Location of Máriakálnok
- Coordinates: 47.85989°N 17.32171°E
- Country: Hungary
- County: Győr-Moson-Sopron

Area
  - Total: 15.48 km^{2} (5.98 sq mi)

Population (2004)
  - Total: 1,508
  - Density: 97.41/km^{2} (252.3/sq mi)
- Time zone: UTC+1 (CET)
  - Summer (DST): UTC+2 (CEST)
- Postal code: 9231
- Area code: 96

Máriakálnok (German: Gahling) is a village in Győr-Moson-Sopron county, Hungary.

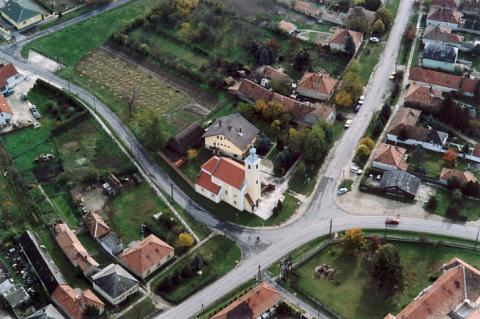
Aerial photography of Máriakálnok
