= Detroit Diesel Series 60 =

Series 60
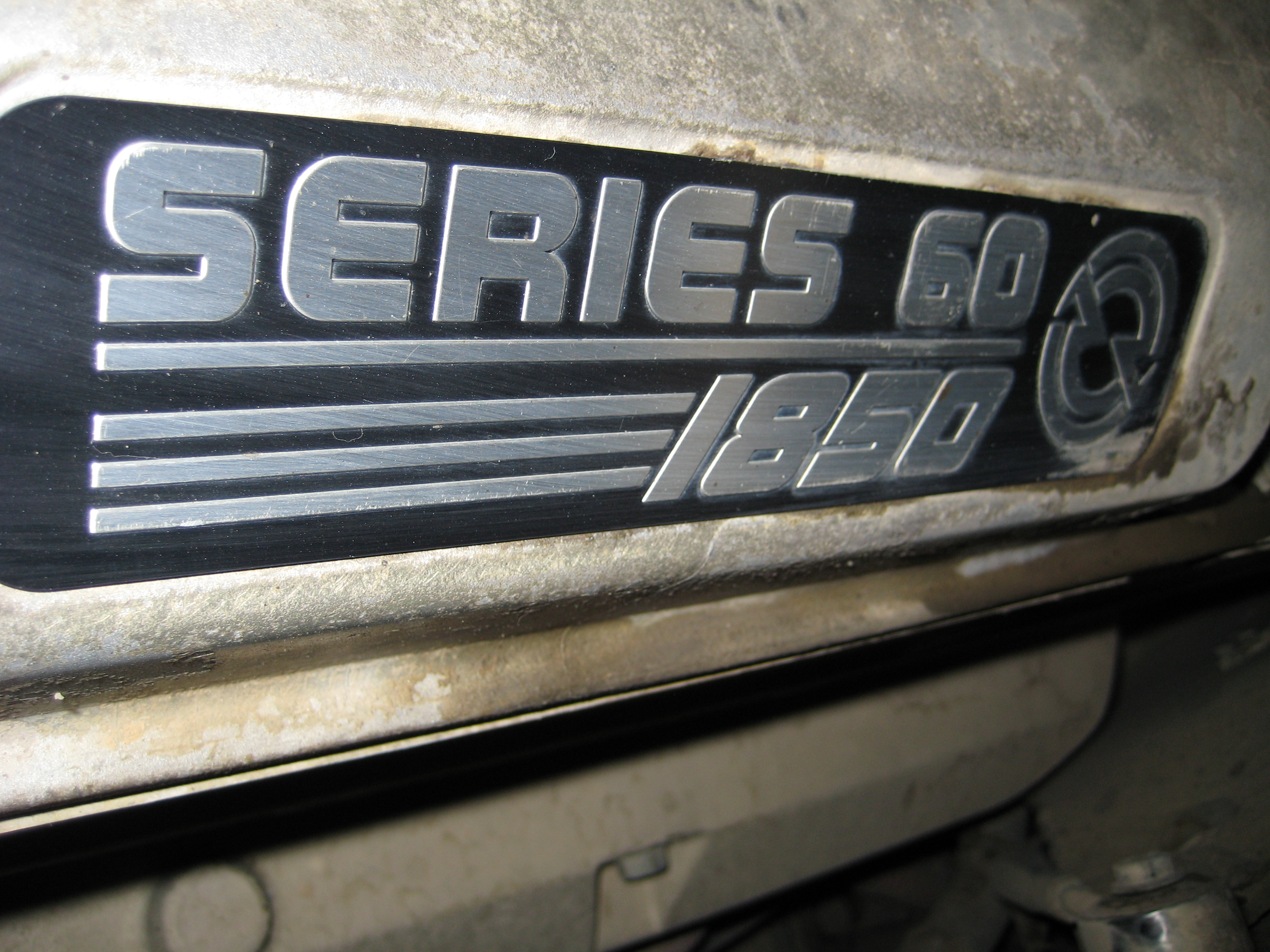

Overview
- Manufacturer: Detroit Diesel
- Production: 1987–2011

Layout
- Configuration: Inline-6
- Displacement: 677, 775, 854 cu in (11.1, 12.7, 14.0 L)
- Cylinder bore: 5.12 in (130 mm) (11.1L); 5.24 in (133 mm)
- Piston stroke: 5.47 in (139 mm) (11.1L); 6.3 in (160 mm); 6.62 in (168 mm)
- Valvetrain: OHC
- Compression ratio: 15.0:1 (11.1L), 16.0:1, 16.5:1

Combustion
- Turbocharger: Wastegated, Variable geometry turbocharger
- Fuel system: Fuel injection
- Fuel type: Diesel
- Cooling system: Water-cooled

Output
- Power output: 300–365 hp (224–272 kW) at 1800–2100 rpm (11.1 L)
- Torque output: 1,150–1,350 lb⋅ft (1,559–1,830 N⋅m) at 1200 rpm (11.1 L)

Dimensions
- Length: 57 in (1,400 mm) (11.1L)
- Width: 34 in (860 mm) (11.1L)
- Height: 50 in (1,300 mm) (11.1L)
- Dry weight: 2,550 lb (1,157 kg) (11.1 L)

Emissions
- Emissions control systems: Diesel particulate filter

Chronology
- Predecessor: Series 71
- Successor: DD15

The Detroit Diesel Series 60 is an inline-six 4 stroke diesel engine produced from 1987 to 2011. At that time, it differed from most on-highway engines by using an overhead camshaft and "drive by wire" electronic control. In 1993, it was popular on many USA buses in the 11.1 L (677 cu in) displacement.

== History ==
When it was introduced in 1987, the Series 60 was the first heavy-duty diesel engine with fully integrated electronic controls. Detroit Diesel prescribed overhaul intervals of 500,000 miles (800,000 km), then raised that to 750,000 miles (1,210,000 km) after more experience was gained with the new engine.

In 1993, the 11.1 L (677 cu in) version was rated at 350 bhp (261 kW) (but would produce 15 more if the cruise control was engaged).

=== 12.7L ===
The Series 60 was also available in 12.7 L (775 cu in) at the time, which was created by a longer stroke of 6.3 in (160 mm). Both engine sizes were also used in truck and tractor-trailer applications.

In 1998, the 11.1-liter Detroit Diesel Series 60 was discontinued. Once the 11.1-liter Series 60 was discontinued, the 12.7-liter Detroit Diesel Series 60 became the motorcoach application. Starting in the late 1990s, Neoplan made the Series 60 as an available engine for their high-floor and low-floor articulated buses - the AN460A and AN460LF. Detroit Diesel began making Series 60 marine engines in 1999, with wider availability starting in 2000.

=== 14.0L ===
In 2001 the bore and stroke increased and the engine displacement rose to 14 L (854 cu in), with an increase in power output to 575 hp (429 kW) and a torque increase to 1,850 lb⋅ft (2,508 N⋅m).

In 2004 the 14-Liter engine became the dominant platform in Freightliner over the road sleeper trucks and changed the ECM to a DDEC V. The 12.7L engine was favored in buses for its better fuel consumption.

In 2007 the 12.7-liter Detroit Diesel Series 60 was discontinued. Once the 12.7-liter Series 60 was discontinued, the 14-liter Series 60 replaced it. By 2008, Detroit Diesel had produced one million Series 60 engines.

In 2007 - 2010 (2008 -2011 trucks), the Detroit Diesel 14L engine was modified to meet new emissions standards and went to a dual ECM configuration (DDEC VI). This engine ran higher compression, higher injector pressure and a DPF exhaust filter. The block and crank remained the same as the older 2004-2006 engine models.

In 2011 the series 60 engine was discontinued and replaced by the DD15 engine.

=== Specifications ===
Specifications for selected Series 60 engines
Displacement	Bore	Stroke	CR	Torque	Power	Dimensions (L×W×H)	Weight
677 cu in (11.1 L)	5.12 in (130 mm)	5.47 in 139 mm	15.0:1	1,150–1,350 lb⋅ft (1,559–1,830 N⋅m) @ 1200 rpm	330–365 hp (246–272 kW) @ 1800–2100 rpm	57 in × 34 in × 50 in (1,450 mm × 860 mm × 1,270 mm)	2,550 lb (1,157 kg)
778 cu in (12.7 L)	5.12 in (130 mm)	6.3 in (160 mm)	16.5:1	1,350–1,650 lb⋅ft (1,830–2,237 N⋅m) @ 1200 rpm	330–505 hp (246–377 kW) @ 2100 rpm	57 in × 34 in × 50 in (1,450 mm × 860 mm × 1,270 mm)	2,640 lb (1,197 kg)
854 cu in (14.0 L)	5.24 in (133 mm)	6.62 in (168 mm)	16.0:1	1,550–1,850 lb⋅ft (2,102–2,508 N⋅m) @ 1200 rpm	435–575 hp (324–429 kW) @ 2100 rpm	57 in × 34 in × 50 in (1,450 mm × 860 mm × 1,270 mm)	2,640 lb (1,197 kg)

== Electronic Control ==
The most popular on-highway Detroit Diesel engine was the 12.7-liter, and on-highway engines are electronically controlled by the proprietary Detroit Diesel Electronic Control (DDEC) system. The DDEC system was the first commercial use of a fully electronic control on a highway engine, and multiple years would pass before other manufacturers followed. The functions available in the DDEC system include engine diagnostic functions, shutdown timers, progressive-shift functions, fault-history, speed limiting, automatic-stall preventing, and cruise control functions; the cruise control function is popular with fleet operators due to the fuel-saving nature of this function. The DDEC system permitted the owner to download engine management reports, including a record of the use of the engine. The system was able to provide records of truck overspeeding, excessive idle time, hard braking, and other parameters, thereby assisting owners in increasing productivity, reducing engine abuse, and decreasing fuel consumption.

Larger fleets purchased their own copies of the software, while smaller owner operators were able to have their computer datasets downloaded by the dealer servicing their engine. The DDEC system allowed dealers and owners to troubleshoot problems with their engines, permitted changes to horsepower settings, and in some cases, alternative programs were able to be loaded into the computer.

The DDEC system is easy to operate, and diagnostic functions are displayed to the driver. Typically, there are two indicator lights, one in yellow and one in red. The red indicator represents a significant-engine fault, and in most cases, the engine shuts down to protect the engine from damage. The yellow light represents a minor fault, and is a cautionary function to alert the operator to a fault that might not be dangerous, or represent immediate damage to the engine. The operator is able to gain basic diagnostic functions via these two lights. Accompanying the two lights there generally is a switch; when pressed in specific circumstances, the red and yellow lights will flash in a specific order and the operator is able to calculate a fault code, and know the specific problem with the engine.

=== DDEC-I (1984-1987) ===
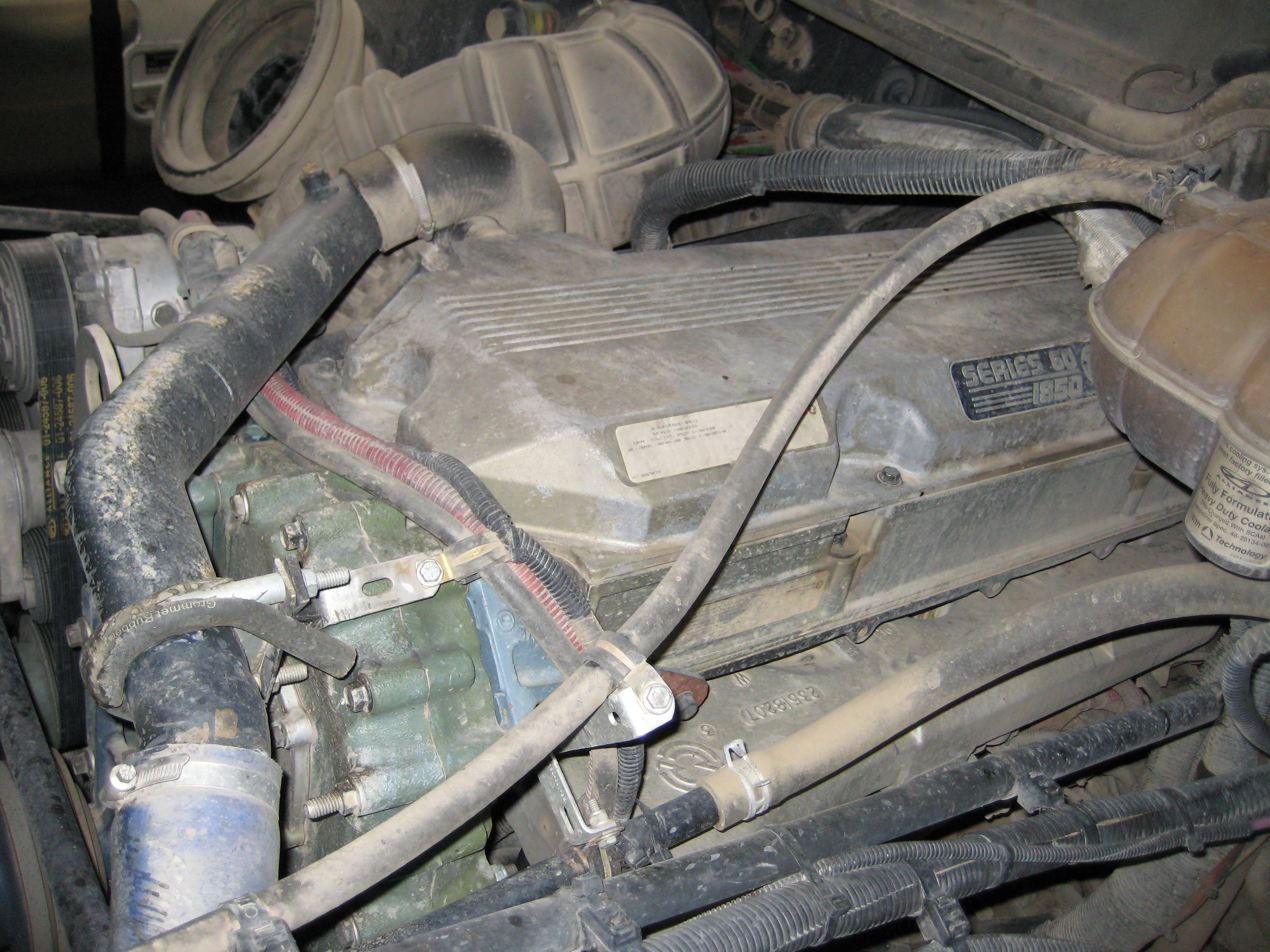
14 Litre S-60 view in a Freightliner Century S/T prime mover

Initially the engine was controlled by the DDEC-I System, which was shortly after replaced by the DDEC-II system which would last up to 1997.

The DDEC-I system was a two-box system. It had an Electronic control module (ECM) in the cab, and an Electronic Driver Module (EDM) on the engine to operate the injectors.

=== DDEC-II (1987-1997) ===
The DDEC-II ECM was a single box mounted on the engine.

The DDEC-II Engine was available in ratings between 365 hp (272 kW) and 500 hp (373 kW). The engine proved extremely popular with fleet operators, and built a strong reputation for reliability and longevity. It was also available in a popular "cruise power" configuration, while encouraging the operator to engage the cruise control function. During the normal use of the engine, 430 hp (321 kW) would be available, and while the cruise control was engaged, the horsepower rating would increase to 470 hp (350 kW), since the engine operated most economically while the cruise control was engaged.

=== DDEC-III (1992-1997) ===
In 1992, the DDEC-III system was introduced, and is available in horsepower ratings up to 470 hp (350 kW) due to revised camshaft timing and other improvements. Again, a "cruise power" option is available, and the standard rating was 430 hp (321 kW), and whilst the cruise control is engaged, the horsepower rating increased to 470 hp (350 kW), encouraging operators to take advantage of reduced-fuel consumption.

The DDEC-III system also introduced dual-voltage (12V/24V) ECM units. Previous DDEC ECM units are 12-volt only. The dual-voltage ECMs ease installation into 24-volt marine, industrial, and non-USA trucks. The use of Battery Charge-Equalizers (Vanner) is not required because the ECM can connect directly to the 24-volt batteries.

The DDEC-III ECM is thinner than the DDEC-II ECM, with wiring connectors at both ends. The front-end has two five-pin connectors for the injectors, and a thirty-pin connector for the engine-sensors. The rear-end has a five-pin Power Connector, six-pin Communications Connector, and a thirty-pin Vehicle-Interface Harness-Connector.

The Detroit Diesel Series 60 DDEC-III (1992-1997) was the most commonly installed generation in heavy-duty trucks and buses during the first half of the 1990s. Although the DDEC-III (Detroit Diesel Electronic Controls III) system remained in limited production until 2000 for specialty applications and replacements, most truck manufacturers discontinued it from the factory after the 1997 model year. This was primarily due to the 1998 EPA regulations, which required more stringent emissions systems and engines specifically designed to meet those requirements. Furthermore, the DDEC-IIIs were optimized for the 1994 EPA regulations, and although they could technically meet the initial EPA 1998 regulations with certain modifications, Detroit Diesel released the new DDEC-IV platform in 1996 to replace the DDEC-III, featuring improvements in fuel injection, electronics, and emissions control. Therefore, the DDEC-III (1992-1997) is considered the most representative and common on the market, while units after 1998 were mainly used for specific projects, remanufacturing, or markets outside North America where regulations allowed EPA 1994 engines beyond 1997.

=== DDEC-IV (1996-2010) ===
1996 brought the introduction of the DDEC-IV engine control module, and further improvements in the design of the engine, notably a wastegated turbocharger and engine management improvements provided increased horsepower ratings up to 500 hp (373 kW), and increased torque outputs to 1,850 lb⋅ft (2,508 N⋅m).

The Detroit Diesel DDEC-IV ECM was introduced in 1996 as the fourth generation of the electronic management system for Series 60 engines. Unlike previous versions, DDEC-IV was available in three main variants, each tailored to the EPA emissions regulations of its time: EPA 1994 (1996–1997): Programmed for engines still homologated under the earlier regulations, with more flexible calibrations but limited to meeting EPA 1994 regulations. These modules were common on engines built before 1998 and were installed in trucks built through the 1997 model year. EPA 1998 (1998–2003): The main version of DDEC-IV, designed to comply with the new 1998 EPA regulations. These ECMs incorporated more stringent control strategies, lower NOx and PM emission limits, and advanced diagnostic functions. They were standard on most on-highway applications from 1998 to 2003. EPA 2004 (2002-2007): The final iteration of DDEC-IV, optimized to meet the demanding EPA 2004 regulations. These modules featured significant programming changes, including more complex emissions reduction strategies, tighter EGR control, and improved real-time emissions monitoring. Although production of DDEC-IV engines extended into 2010 in some cases, this version was officially replaced by the new generation DDEC-V beginning in 2002. In summary, the DDEC-IV ECM enjoyed a long lifespan due to its robustness and flexibility, but its programming and application were clearly divided by the environmental regulations in force at the time.

DDEC-V (2002-2010)

Introduced in 2002, the Detroit Diesel Electronic Control V (DDEC-V) system was an evolution of the DDEC-IV system, incorporating a dual-control architecture with two redundant microprocessors for improved reliability. This system offered more precise control of the fuel and emissions system, allowing it to meet EPA 2004 and 2007 emissions standards. New fuel injection strategies, more advanced on-board diagnostics, and support for technologies such as exhaust gas recirculation (EGR) were also introduced. Power outputs were increased to 515 hp and torque to 1,850 lb⋅ft, especially on engines such as the Series 60 and MBE 4000.

== Competing power plants ==
- Caterpillar C13
- Caterpillar C15
- Caterpillar 3406
- Cummins ISX
- Cummins ISX12
- Cummins ISM
- Cummins L10
- Cummins M11
- Cummins N14

== See also ==
- Detroit Diesel Series 50, a 4-cylinder engine derived from the Series 60
