= Zoltán Cséfalvay =

Hungarian politician, economist and geographer

His Excellency Zoltán Cséfalvay

Minister of State for the National Economy
- In office 2014–2018

Permanent Representative of Hungary to UNESCO and the OECD
- In office 2010–2014

Personal details
- Born: March 27, 1958 (age 68) Máriakálnok, Hungary
- Spouse: Anna Maria Bartal
- Children: Chris von Csefalvay
- Education: University of Debrecen, Hungarian Academy of Sciences, LMU Munich
- Occupation: Politician, university lecturer and geographer
- Cabinet: First Orbán government, Second Orbán Government
- Awards: Knight's Cross of the Order of Merit of the Republic of Poland

Zoltán Cséfalvay is a Hungarian politician, economist and geographer. He served as Secretary of State for Strategy with the Ministry of the National Economy of Hungary, and later as Hungary's ambassador to UNESCO and the OECD.

== Education ==
Born in Máriakálnok, Hungary in 1958, Zoltán Cséfalvay attended the University of Debrecen from 1977 to 1982, and between 1987 and 1988, he held a German Academic Exchange Service grant at LMU Munich. He received his PhD in geography from the Hungarian Academy of Sciences in 1996. The University of Debrecen awarded him his habilitation in 1999.

== Career ==
=== First Orbán government ===
He was appointed Deputy Secretary of State for Regional Economic Development in the First Orbán government under Minister for Economic Affairs György Matolcsy.

=== Second Orbán government ===
In 2010, he was appointed Minister of State for the National Economy, where he served as the ministry's Parliamentary Secretary as well. During this period, he managed the negotiations with the International Monetary Fund and the European Commission in addressing the Hungarian deficit crisis.

=== Joint ambassador to UNESCO and OECD ===
He presented his credentials as Hungary's permanent representative to the OECD and Hungary's ambassador extraordinary and plenipotentiary to UNESCO in January 2015.

=== JRC Seville ===
After the end of his posting with UNESCO and OECD, he took up a senior grantholder's position in December 2018 at the European Commission's Joint Research Centre in Seville, Spain, where his work focused on the impact of robotics on European industry and the economic drivers of competitiveness.

== Awards and recognition ==
In 2014, he was awarded the Knight's Cross of the Order of Merit of the Republic of Poland in recognition of his work in the field of Polish-Hungarian bilateral economic cooperation.

== Personal life ==
He is married to the Hungarian social scientist and university lecturer Anna Mária Bartal. They have one son.
