= GreenXC =

GreenXC, established in 2011, is an organization that works to raise awareness for National Parks, National Forests and the National Park Foundation, the official charity of America’s nearly 400 national parks. It focuses on the youth and reaches out to connect them to the parks and forests in order to ensure the parks are supported for the next generation of taxpayers. GreenXC aligns itself with the National Park Foundation's goal of being "deeply committed to engaging the country's youth into a lifelong experience with the parks."

GreenXC also works closely with the USDA United States Forest Service on setting destinations for their cross-country awareness campaign during the summer of 2011. They will be visiting and touring various sites and conducting interviews which they will share with their readers through their site. The purpose of the campaign is to encourage the young generation to have a more active involvement with their environment.

== Focus on Young Generation ==
GreenXC aligns itself with the Federal Government's goal of promoting the National Parks and Forests to the young generation. In 2011, the President set as one of the top goals of the Federal Government to promote the great outdoors and especially to the youth. "Special attention should be given to bringing young Americans into the conversation."
