= Conference of NGOs =

Association of NGOs

The Conference of NGOs (CoNGO) full name Conference of Non-Governmental Organizations in Consultative Relationship with the United Nations, is an independent, international, non-profit membership association of non-governmental organizations (NGOs).

== History ==
CoNGO (Conference of Non-Governmental Organizations in Consultative Relationship with the United Nations) is an international NGO founded in 1948. The United Nations Economic and Social Council (ECOSOC) granted CoNGO "General Consultative Status".

== Description and governance ==
CoNGO is "an independent, international, not-for-profit membership association of nongovernmental organizations that facilitates the participation of NGOs in United Nations debates and decisions". It assists NGOs' participation in UN debates and decision-making, but does not adopt positions on substantive matters; rather, provides the opportunity for its members to discuss such matters with UN Secretariat and UN system agency officials, UN delegations, and various other experts.

The Assembly elected 20 organizations to serve on the CoNGO board at a conference in October 2025 at the Church Center for the United Nations in New York and online. As of 2026 CoNGO has 525 member organizations and 106 associate members, from around the world. Full members are those NGOs with consultative status with ECOSOC, while Associate members are those with affiliation with a UN programme or agency. Peter Preziosi of the NGO TruMerit, an American NGO that provides accreditation for foreign nurses, was elected president in 2026.

The CoNGO Board meets twice a year.

The CoNGO 2005 report lists funding, coming mainly from the Swiss Agency for Development and Cooperation, the Canadian Government, the International Telecommunication Union and membership dues, in total nearly US$490,000.

== Committees ==
CoNGO has committees based in Geneva, Switzerland; New York, US; Vienna, Austria; and other regions. Each regional committee has a number of focused committees, for example several NGO Committees on Ageing, Migration, Rare Diseases, Status of Women, Drugs, etc. in the main cities, and Asia Pacific Women's Watch (NGO CSW/Asia & Pacific); Women in Law and Development in Africa FEMNET (NGO CSW/Africa); and Fundacion para Estudio e Investigacion de la Mujer (FEIM) in Buenos Aires (NGO CSW/Latin America and Caribbean).

=== RCAP ===
The Regional Committee in Asia-Pacific (RCAP) aims to facilitate participation by Asia-Pacific NGOs in all UN and CoNGO activities both internationally and regionally.

=== NGO CSW/NY ===
NGO CSW/NY (NGO CSW New York) is a civil society coalition accredited by ECOSOC. Founded in 1972 under the auspices of CoNGO, the coalition has provided a forum for knowledge exchange of women's rights organizations and advocates, and to help with getting their voices heard in the UN. Over time, its role has expanded to include supporting the international implementation of the Beijing Platform for Action, adopted at the Fourth World Conference on Women in 1995, as well as various other UN agreements.

As of 2026 it has 159 Regular members (ECOSOC-accredited) and 99 Associate members

=== CSVGC-NY ===
The NGO Committee on Spirituality, Values and Global Concerns (CSVGC-NY) "envisions a global culture of peace based on justice, solidarity, inclusiveness, shared responsibility, harmony, cooperation, compassion, love, wisdom, goodwill and reverence for the sacredness of all life through active peaceful engagement".

It hosts an annual award known as the Spirit of the UN Award (SUNA) during the Annual Week of Spirituality, Values and Global Concerns, launched in October 2007 by CSVGC-NY. Each year, it recognises several recipients with the award. The award is given in five categories:

- UN Diplomat
- UN System Official
- NGO Representative affiliated with the UN through ECOSOC or the DPI
- Youth
- Special Award

== Activities ==
A meeting organized by CoNGO Vienna and United Nations Information Service Vienna (UNIS), titled "Working effectively within the UN – CoNGO Committees: Present and future" was held on 11 December 2019. CSW Vienna, NGO committee on Aging UN Vienna, NGO Committee on Peace Vienna, Young Generations Working Group, and Vienna NGO Committee on Drugs also assisted in organizing the meeting.
