= Cummins M-series engine =

Overview
- Manufacturer: Cummins
- Also called: M11, M11 CELECT Plus, ISM, ISMe
- Production: 1994–2010 (M11, M11 CELECT, ISM); 1994–present (ISMe)

Layout
- Configuration: Straight six diesel engine
- Displacement: 10.8 L (659.1 cu in)
- Cylinder bore: 4.921 in (125.0 mm)
- Piston stroke: 5.787 in (147.0 mm)
- Cylinder block material: Cast iron, CGI compact graphite
- Cylinder head material: Cast iron

Combustion
- Turbocharger: Holset Variable Geometry Turbocharger (ISM)
- Fuel type: Diesel
- Oil system: Wet sump
- Cooling system: Water cooled

Chronology
- Predecessor: Cummins L10
- Successor: ISX12

The Cummins M-series engine is a straight-six diesel engine designed and produced by Cummins. It displaces 10.8 litres (659.1 cu in). Introduced as the M11 in 1994, it was built on the previous L10 engine (also 4.921 inches (125.0 mm) cylinder bore, but a longer 5.787 inches (147.0 mm) piston stroke compared to the L10's 5.354 inches (136.0 mm) stroke).

Later M11's received the electronic CELECT and CELECT Plus fuel systems consisting of a gear pump and solenoid controlled injectors. The M11 CELECT Plus became the ISM when Cummins applied its Interact System (hence the "IS" in ISM) to the M11 CELECT Plus in 1998. The ISM is available in four configurations, with slightly different emphasis on maximum power (450 horsepower (336 kW; 456 PS) vs. 500 horsepower (373 kW; 507 PS)) and peak torque.

== Applications ==
- Large transit buses (40 feet (12 m) and up).
- Coaches
- Large fire trucks
- Heavy-duty trucks
- Off-Highway (QSM11)

== Power ratings ==
=== Urban bus ===
925 pound force-feet (1,254 N⋅m) @ 1200 rpm, 280 horsepower (209 kW; 284 PS) (209 kW) electronically governed at 2,100 rpm
1,150 pound force-feet (1,559 N⋅m) @ 1200 rpm, 330 horsepower (246 kW; 335 PS) (246 kW) electronically governed at 2,100 rpm

=== RV, Truck, Motorcoach ===
1,050 pound force-feet (1,424 N⋅m) @ 1200 rpm, 280 horsepower (209 kW; 284 PS) (209 kW) electronically governed at 2,100 rpm
1,150 pound force-feet (1,559 N⋅m) @ 1200 rpm, 310 horsepower (231 kW; 314 PS) (246 kW) electronically governed at 2,100 rpm
1,250 pound force-feet (1,695 N⋅m) @ 1200 rpm, 330 horsepower (246 kW; 335 PS) (209 kW) electronically governed at 2,100 rpm
1,350 pound force-feet (1,830 N⋅m) @ 1200 rpm, 330 horsepower (246 kW; 335 PS) (246 kW) electronically governed at 2,100 rpm
1,350 pound force-feet (1,830 N⋅m) @ 1200 rpm, 350 horsepower (261 kW; 355 PS) (209 kW) electronically governed at 2,100 rpm
1,350 pound force-feet (1,830 N⋅m) @ 1200 rpm, 370 horsepower (276 kW; 375 PS) (246 kW) electronically governed at 2,100 rpm
1,450 pound force-feet (1,966 N⋅m) @ 1200 rpm, 370 horsepower (276 kW; 375 PS) (246 kW) electronically governed at 2,100 rpm
1,450 pound force-feet (1,966 N⋅m) @ 1200 rpm, 400 horsepower (298 kW; 406 PS) (246 kW) electronically governed at 2,100 rpm
1,550 pound force-feet (2,102 N⋅m) @ 1200 rpm, 425 horsepower (317 kW; 431 PS) (246 kW) electronically governed at 2,100 rpm
1,450 pound force-feet (1,966 N⋅m) @ 1200 rpm, 450 horsepower (336 kW; 456 PS) (246 kW) electronically governed at 2,100 rpm
1,550 pound force-feet (2,102 N⋅m) @ 1200 rpm, 500 horsepower (373 kW; 507 PS) (246 kW) electronically governed at 2,100 rpm
