= List of streetcar lines in Westchester County, New York =

The following streetcar lines once operated in Westchester County, New York. Many systems in Westchester eventually came under control of either the Third Avenue Railway, the Fifth Avenue Coach Company, or the Connecticut Company-owned New York and Stamford Railway.

== Streetcar Lines in Westchester County ==
- Ossining Electric Railway
- Westchester Traction Company (successor to Ossining Electric Railway)
- Hudson River and Eastern Traction Company (Ossining)
- Peekskill Lighting and Railroad Company (successor to Peekskill Traction Company)
- Putnam and Westchester Traction Company (Peekskill and Putnam Valley)
- New York and Stamford Railway
- Tarrytown, White Plains and Mamaroneck Railway (successor to the New York, Elmsford and White Plains Railway)
- Yonkers Railroad (a consolidation of the North and South Electric Railway and the Yonkers and Tarrytown Electric Railroad)
- Third Avenue Railway
- New York, Westchester and Connecticut Traction (Mount Vernon and Pelham)
- Westchester Electric Railroad (combination of the Mount Vernon and Eastchester Railway and the New Rochelle Railway Transit Company)
- Goldens Bridge Electric Railway of New York
