= Ossining =

Ossining may refer to:

- Ossining, New York, a town in Westchester County, New York state
- Ossining (village), New York, a village in the town of Ossining
- Ossining High School, a comprehensive public high school in Ossining village
- Ossining Electric Railway, a former streetcar transit line in Westchester County
- Ossining station, a commuter rail stop on the Metro-North Railroad's Hudson Line in Ossining village
- "Ossining", a 2003 song by Mike Doughty from Rockity Roll

== See also ==
- Sing Sing, a New York state prison located in Ossining
