= Peekskill Lighting and Railroad Company =

Streetcar line in New York

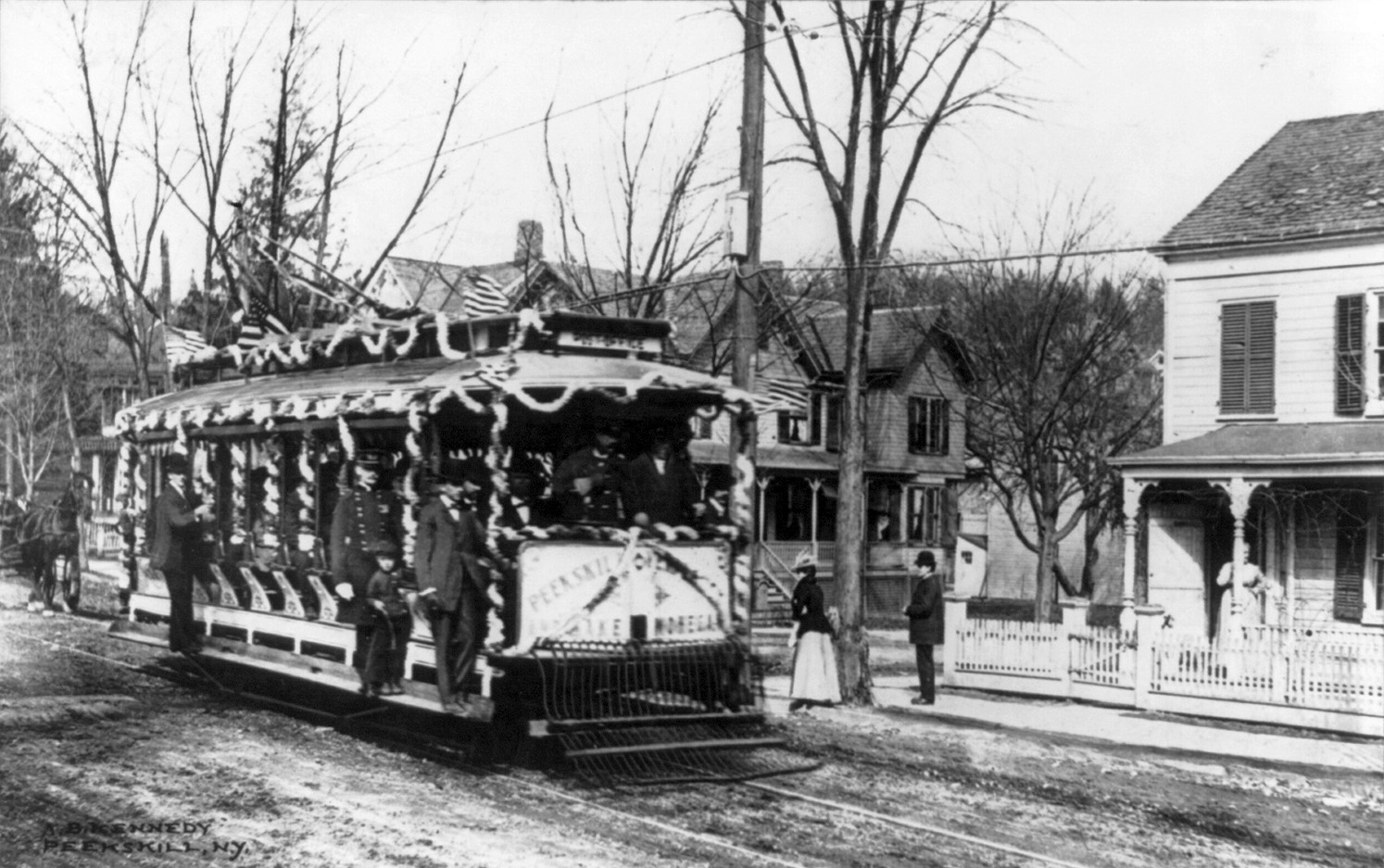
- An affiliate of the Peekskill Lighting and Railroad Company en route to Lake Mohegan in 1907

Overview
- Headquarters: Peekskill, New York
- Locale: Westchester County, New York, and Putnam County, New York
- Dates of operation: 1899–1926

Technical
- Track gauge: 4 ft 8 1/2 in (1,435 mm)
- Electrification: 600v DC

The Peekskill Lighting and Railroad Company was a streetcar transit line operating in northern Westchester County and southern Putnam County, New York. The earliest segment was constructed by the Peekskill Traction Company in 1899, running 5.5 miles (8.9 km) from the New York Central Railroad train station at Peekskill to Lake Mohegan. The company was unable to meet payments for construction of the line, so the contractor operated the railroad until it was sold to the Peekskill Lighting and Railroad Company in 1900 (itself a consolidation of the Peekskill Gas Light Co., Peekskill Electric Light and Power Co., and the Peekskill Traction Co.). The associated Westchester and Putnam Traction Company built extensions beyond Lake Mohegan, though the two companies were operated as one. In 1902, an extension was constructed through Buchannan to Verplanck. Another extension was opened in 1907 to Cortlandville, and Varian's Mills (later Williams Corners) in 1908. The final extension to Oregon (Putnam Valley) opened in 1909. President of the company was F.A. Stratton, who was also president of the Hudson River and Eastern Traction company, operators of the Ossining Electric Railway.

== Decline and Conversion to Bus Operation ==
The first cutbacks came in 1924. The trolley system operated at a deficit for months, first reducing service to Oregon and Putnam Valley to Saturday-only in 1925, and ending service on the Oregon line on August 29, 1925. The remaining track around Peekskill was closed and trolley service ended on June 30, 1926. Peekskill Lighting and Railroad Co. created Peekskill Motor Bus Company as a new subsidiary to acquire and operate the transportation franchise in place of trolleys in 1926. Four routes were operated, using the Peekskill train station as a hub. At the time of its abandonment, the trolley lines of Peekskill Lighting and Railroad Co. was the last of the Consolidated Gas Company affiliated utilities to offer common-carrier rail transportation. The bus routes were taken over by Westchester County Department of Transportation and operated as part of the Bee-Line Bus System in 1978.
