= Southern Boulevard =

Southern Boulevard may refer to the following roads in the United States:

- Southern Boulevard (Bronx), New York City
- Southern Boulevard (Palm Beach County, Florida)
- Southern Boulevard Parkway, Philadelphia, Pennsylvania
- Southern Boulevard Railroad, Bronx, New York City, chartered in 1885
