= Liberty Lines Transit =

Bus company in Westchester, New York

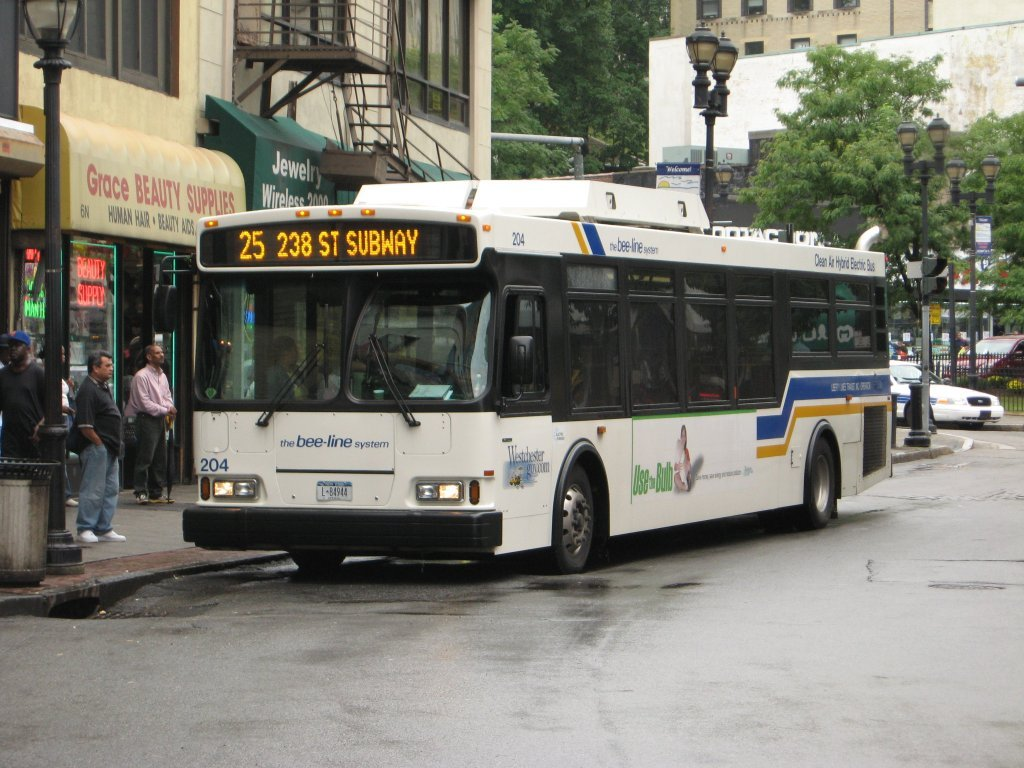
- A Bee-Line bus operated by Liberty Lines
- Founded: 1953
- Headquarters: 475 Saw Mill River Road; Yonkers, NY
- Locale: Westchester County, NY
- Fleet: 350
- Annual ridership: 32,014,368 (2008)
- Chairman: Gerard Bernacchia
- Website: www.libertylines.com

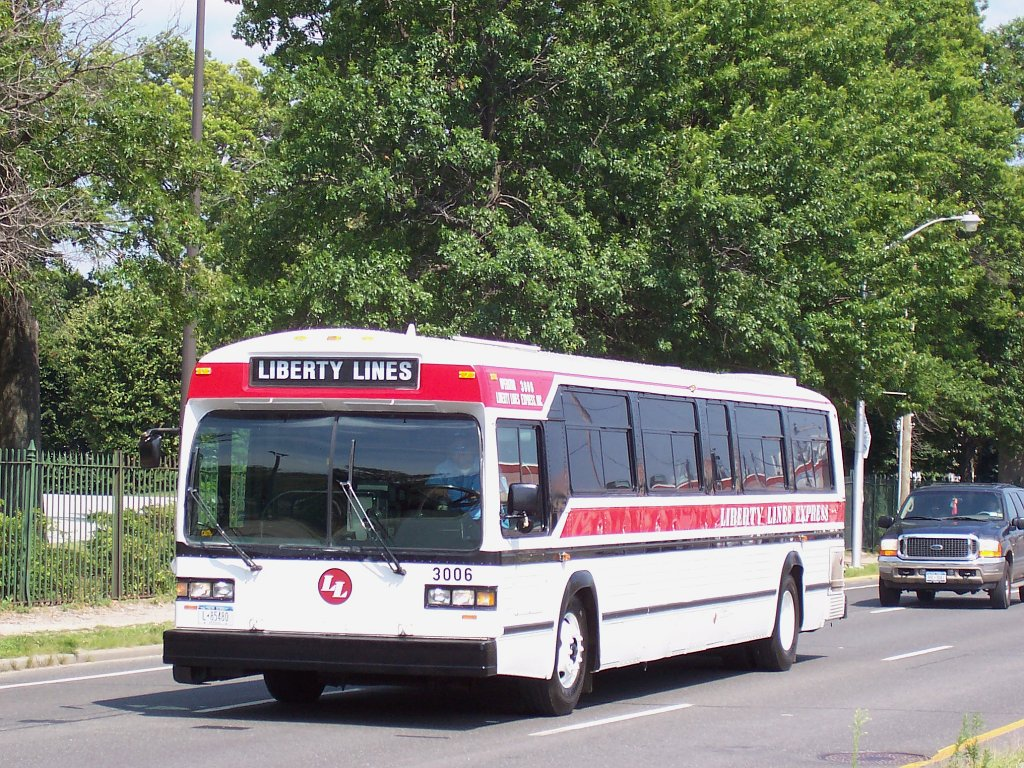
Former branding of Liberty Lines Express

Liberty Lines Transit is the owner of local bus routes in Westchester County, New York, and operates these and other local bus routes under contract as part of the Bee-Line Bus System. It had been affiliated with Liberty Lines Express, the owner of express bus routes in New York City, which operated those express bus routes under contract to the New York City Department of Transportation. The company's headquarters are located in Yonkers, New York. It currently operates around 320 vehicles, all owned by Westchester County.

== Liberty Lines Transit, Inc. ==
The origins of Liberty Lines Transit, Inc., go back to the Bernacchia Brothers bus company. In 1953 Liberty Coaches, Inc., was formed, and the brothers transferred their operating rights to the new company. In 1969, Bus Associates, Inc., was formed and served as a holding company for Liberty Coaches, Inc., and other bus companies that would be acquired. Subsequently added as subsidiaries of Bus Associates, Inc., were companies such as West Fordham Transportation Corp. and Westchester Street Transportation Company, Inc. in 1969, Yonkers Transit Corp. in 1972, Riverdale Transit Corp. in 1975, and Club Transportation Corp. in 1981. In 1982, the subsidiaries operating local bus routes in Westchester County were merged into Liberty Lines Transit, Inc. Since then, the routes of Hartsdale Bus Company, Inc., were acquired in 1999.

== Liberty Lines Express, Inc. ==
Liberty Lines Express Inc., from 1984 to 2005, operated express bus service from the Bronx and Yonkers to Manhattan. Most of the express routes had been initiated by Riverdale Transit Corp., which began service on August 19, 1968. One express route had been initiated by Pelham Parkway Bus Service, Inc., a subsidiary of Bus Associates, Inc., in April 1971. In November 1975 Bus Associates, Inc., acquired Riverdale Transit Corp. In 1984, the two express bus company subsidiaries were merged into Liberty Lines Express, Inc., and continued operating through January 2, 2005. Liberty Lines Express, Inc., sold its operating rights to the City of New York, which through a memorandum of understanding with the Metropolitan Transportation Authority agreed to have the express routes operated by MTA Bus Company. This service is now run by MTA Bus, effective January 3, 2005, and operating out of its Yonkers Bus Depot.

Those routes were:

- BxM1 East Midtown Manhattan - Riverdale (formerly Riverdale Transit Inc.)
- BxM2 West Midtown Manhattan - Riverdale (formerly Riverdale Transit Inc.)
- BxM3 Midtown Manhattan - Getty Square, Yonkers in Westchester, via Broadway in the Bronx, and Sedgwick Av. (formerly Riverdale Transit Inc.)
- BxM4A Midtown Manhattan - Bedford Park (discontinued under MTA Bus in 2010) (formerly Riverdale Transit Inc.)
- BxM4B Midtown Manhattan - Woodlawn, via Grand Concourse and Katonah Av. (now BxM4) (formerly Riverdale Transit Inc.)
- BxM11 Midtown Manhattan - Wakefield, via White Plains Road (formerly Pelham Parkway Express Inc.)
- BxM18 Financial District, Manhattan - Riverdale

== In popular culture ==
- A Liberty Lines bus is featured in many scenes in 1984's Moscow on the Hudson. It is used to transport a Russian circus company around NYC, especially to Bloomingdale's where Robin Williams' character defects. Also, retired busses were used in the Schwarzenegger movie Red Heat, a movie supposedly set in Chicago.
