= Danbury and Bethel Street Railway =

Streetcar transit operator in Connecticut, U.S.

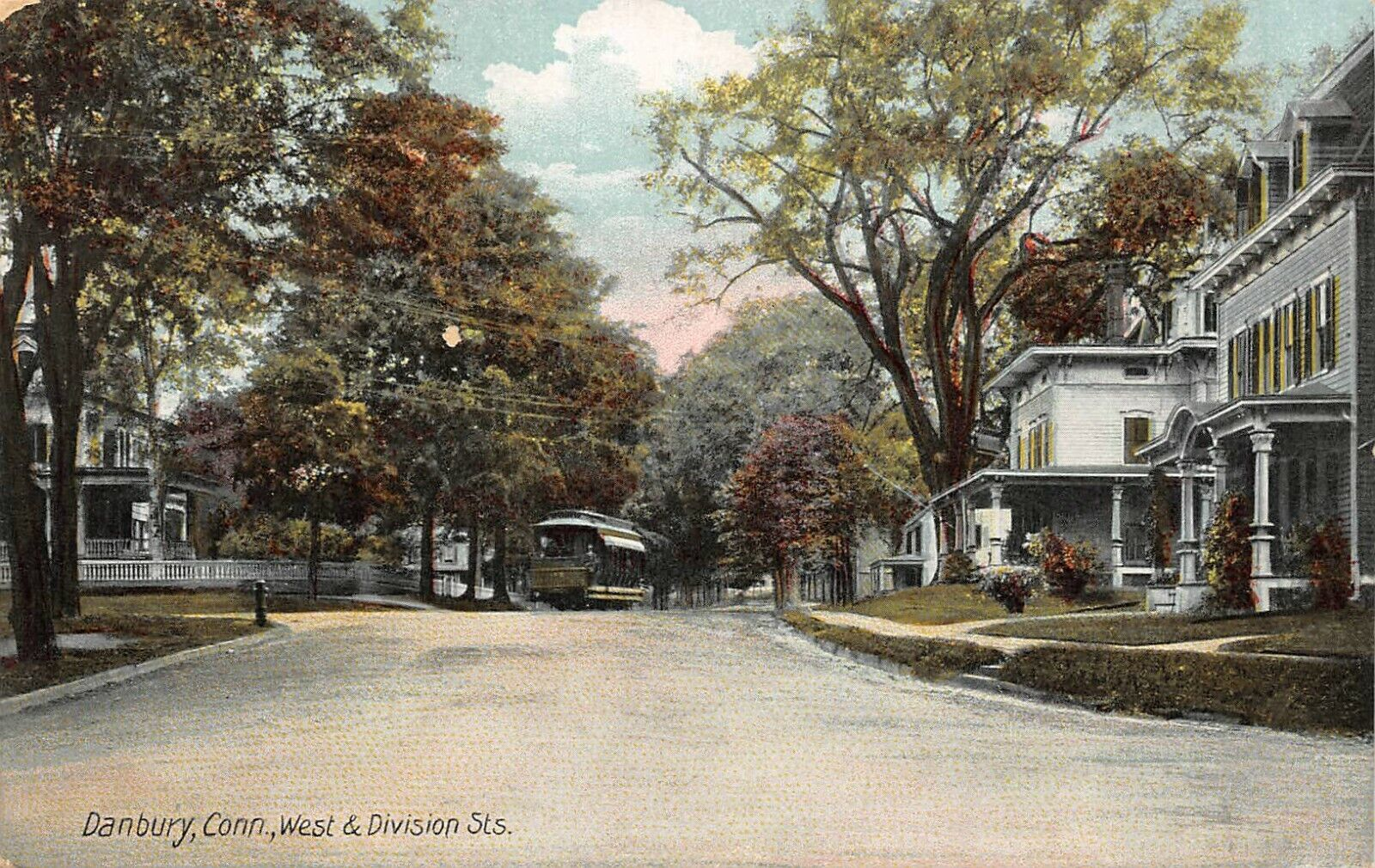
- Postcard of a streetcar at West and Division

Overview
- Headquarters: Danbury, Connecticut
- Locale: Danbury, Connecticut
- Dates of operation: 1886–1964
- Successor: Housatonic Area Regional Transit

Technical
- Track gauge: 4 ft 8 1/2 in (1,435 mm)
- Electrification: 600v DC

The Danbury and Bethel Street Railway was a streetcar transit operator serving the greater Danbury, Connecticut, area, originally chartered in 1886. It was one of the few trolley companies to remain independent of the Connecticut Company consolidation of transit lines throughout the state. Electric trolley service between Danbury and Bethel began in 1887. The streetcar line connected to the Danbury and Harlem Traction Company at the Fairgrounds, but no service was provided and the line was abandoned by 1910. The Danbury and Bethel Street Railway faced its first financial difficulties in 1914 as ridership declined with the closure of local factories. The construction of an aborted extension to Bridgeport had nearly exhausted the railway's cash reserves. The company was purchased by J. Moss Ives in 1918 with the intention of bringing the operation back to profitability. The first buses were ordered and put into operation in 1912 between Main Street and Lake Avenue in Danbury. Ives reorganized as the Danbury and Bethel Traction Company in 1925. When the proposal to replace all remaining streetcar lines with bus operation was announced, the trolley motormen all went on strike in November 1926. The work stoppage did not affect the transition, and by the end of 1926 all streetcar operation had been abandoned, making it the first line in Connecticut to completely convert to bus operation.

== Bus Transit Operations (1927-1965) ==
The Danbury Power and Transportation Company succeeded Danbury and Bethel Traction Company and continued to operate local bus transit service around the city of Danbury. The company was headed by A. William Sperry, founder of Sperry Engineering. Streamlined GMC transit buses began to appear between 1945 and 1948. William T. Sperry took over operations from his father in 1950. A number of fare increases through the 1950s were proposed to keep pace with rising costs.

The bus operation grew into a regional system by the 1950s. Routes to Brewster, Bridgeport, and Norwalk were operated by subsidiary Intercity Coach and Danbury Bus Company. Sperry also operated White Lines in Bridgeport, as well as local services in Fort Lauderdale, Florida, and Levittown, New York. Sperry also provided school bus services in Danbury and the surrounding communities through subsidiary County Bus Service.

In September 1964, Danbury Power and Transportation, Danbury Bus, and Intercity Coach all suspended operation when their liability insurance had expired due to non-payment. An interim operator from New Haven kept the local service running in the meantime. A month after the transit service was suspended, the banks had seized County Bus Service which disrupted school bus service throughout the region. The fleet was repossessed and new operators took over the following week.

== From Private to Public Operation (1965-1979) ==
The local transit franchises were acquired by Candlewood Bus Company in 1965. Operation then passed to ABC Bus Company for a few months until all local bus service was suspended in 1967. The Danbury-Bethel Transit District was formed in 1972 to restore local bus transit service to Danbury and Bethel. Service began in 1973, with Candlewood Valley Bus Company operating the service under contract. The Chieppo Bus Co. of New Haven provided infrequent bus service between Danbury and Bridgeport during the 1960s and 1970s before going out of business; since the early 1980s, there has been no direct bus service between Danbury and Bridgeport. In 1979, New Milford was added to the transit district. The system was soon rebranded and renamed Housatonic Area Regional Transit (HART).
