= New York and Stamford Railway =

Railway in New York, United States

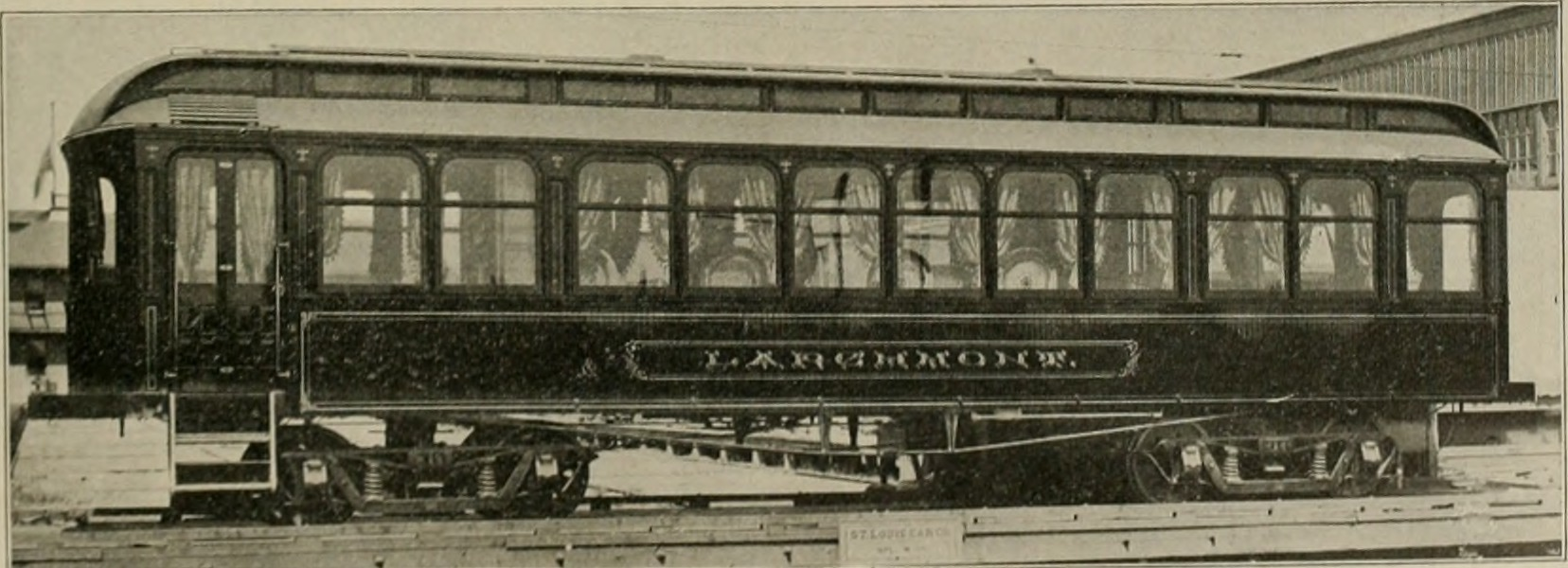
- Parlor car Larchmont made by the St. Louis Car Company for the personal use of Col. N. H. Heft on the New York & Stamford Railway.

Overview
- Headquarters: Port Chester, New York
- Locale: Westchester County, New York, and Fairfield County, Connecticut
- Dates of operation: 1901–1927
- Predecessor: Larchmont Horse Railway Company; Port Chester Railroad Company
- Successor: County Transportation Company

Technical
- Track gauge: 4 ft 8 1/2 in (1,435 mm)
- Electrification: 600v DC

The New York and Stamford Railway was a streetcar line that connected the Westchester County suburbs of New Rochelle, Larchmont, Mamaroneck, Harrison, Rye, and Port Chester, with the Connecticut suburbs of Greenwich and Stamford. The company was formed in 1901 when the New York, New Haven and Hartford Railroad combined the Larchmont Horse Railway Company with the Port Chester Street Railroad Company. The Larchmont Horse Railway Company was founded in 1888 by the Larchmont Manor Company to construct a line from the New York, New Haven and Hartford Railroad Larchmont train station to its development 1.2 miles from town. The line was rebuilt for electric operation and extended to Harrison in 1901. The Port Chester Street Railroad opened in 1898 serving Port Chester, New York. The trolley line was soon extended west through Rye to Harrison in 1901. The two companies were merged that summer to form the New York and Stamford Railway. Trackage rights over the Westchester Electric Railroad were obtained for access to New Rochelle.

In 1905, the NY&S was leased to NYNH&H subsidiary Consolidated Railway (of Connecticut), which in turn controlled the Greenwich Tramway Company via stock transfer effective December 29, 1904, and outright purchase of property and franchises on September 19, 1905. The Greenwich Tramway Through operations form New Rochelle to Stamford commenced soon after. The Consolidated Railway was leased by the Connecticut Company on May 31, 1907.

In the 1920s, management of the streetcar line was transferred to the New York, Westchester and Boston Railway, another subsidiary of the New Haven. Routes were realigned to provide feeder service to NYW&B stations. The County Transportation Company was formed as a subsidiary of NY&S in 1925 to replace some streetcar lines with bus operation. All streetcar lines had been replaced with buses by the end of 1927. In 1928, the NYW&B acquired control of Soundview Transportation Company, which served bus routes in White Plains. County Transportation Company operated Soundview's routes under agreement, and continued to do so until it was sold off by the New Haven in 1948. Sometime after the NYW&B declared bankruptcy, control of the New York and Stamford and County Transportation was returned to the New Haven. County Transportation Company was sold off to private interests in 1957, and its operations were absorbed by Westchester County's Bee-Line Bus System in 1978.

== See also ==
- Connecticut Company
