= Danbury and Harlem Traction Company =

Uncompleted inter urban railroad

The Danbury and Harlem Traction Company was an unfinished electric rapid-transit interurban railroad connecting Danbury, Connecticut, with the New York Central Railroad station at Goldens Bridge, New York, on the Harlem Line.

== History ==
The company was established in 1901 as the consolidation of the Danbury and Goldens Bridge Street Railway of Connecticut and the Goldens Bridge Electric Railway of New York, and set out to build from Danbury. The motivation was to provide a faster passenger route to New York than that offered by the Danbury Branch of the New Haven Railroad.

Construction progressed slowly. Tracks were laid from a connection with the Danbury and Bethel Street Railway near the Danbury Fairgrounds, west through Ridgebury and eventually just across the state line to North Salem, New York, by 1901. Aside from a few test runs with cars borrowed from the Danbury and Bethel line, there is no indication that regular service was ever offered on the partially completed line.

In 1902, the project was acquired by the Westchester Traction Company, and immediately investors were sought to continue construction. This extended the roadbed grade to Goldens Bridge, but no further rails were ever laid. Permission was obtained to open between Danbury and Ridgebury in 1903 and a limited service was operated, possibly by the Danbury and Bethel Street Railway, but this was short-lived. Looking to recoup some of the shareholder's investment, the company directors ordered the rails to be lifted sometime between 1910 and 1915, and the project was abandoned.

Much of the line is traceable around Ridgefield, including a section called Old Trolley Road, and earthworks survive here and there.
