= Third Avenue Railway =

Streetcar system in southern New York (1852–1952)

Third Avenue Railway System

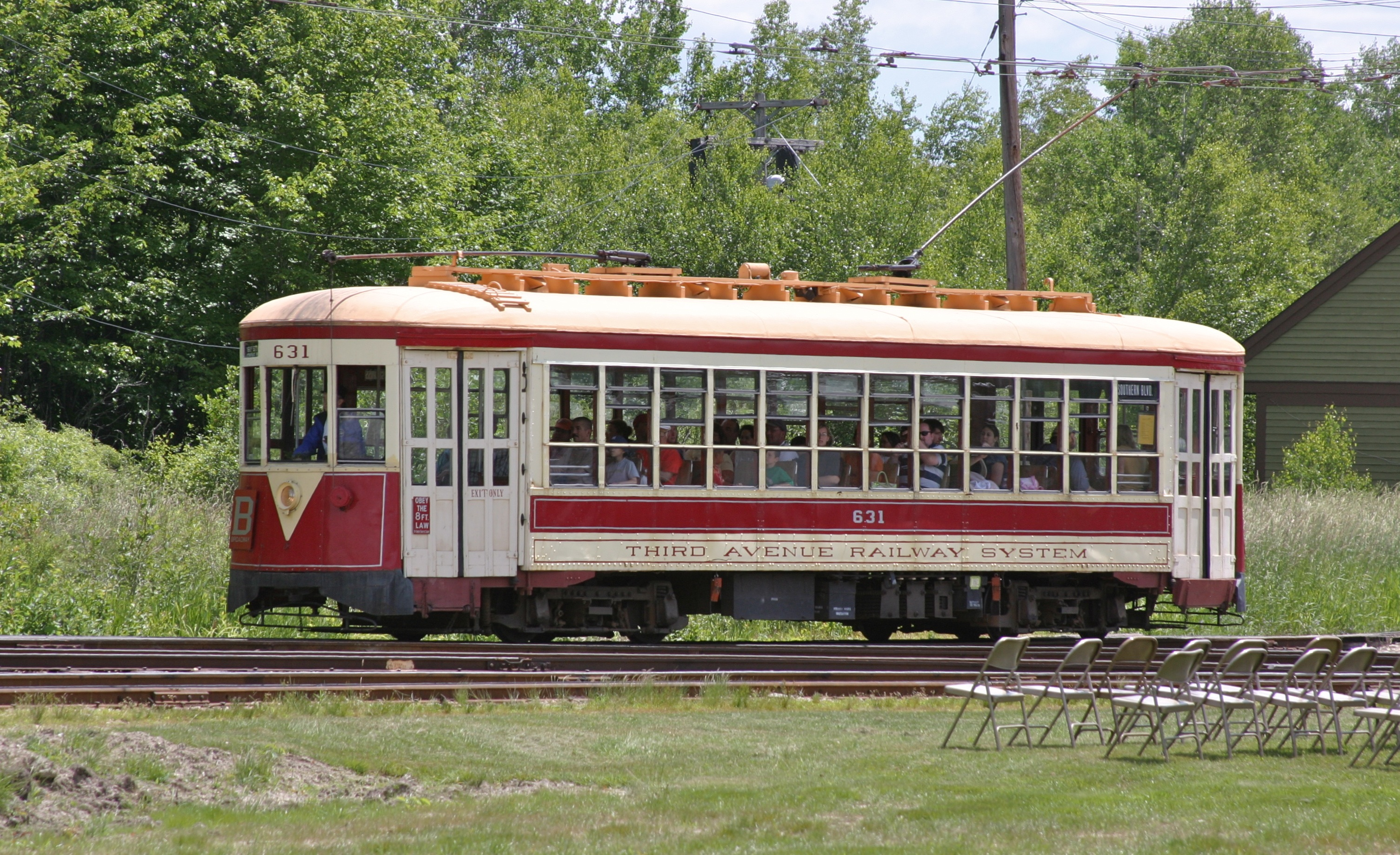
- Third Avenue car operated at the Seashore Trolley Museum, Kennebunkport, Maine.

Overview
- Headquarters: New York, New York
- Dates of operation: 1853–1956
- Predecessor: Third Avenue Railroad Company
- Successor: New York City Omnibus Corporation

Technical
- Track gauge: 4 ft 8 1/2 in (1,435 mm)
- Electrification: 600v DC

The Third Avenue Railway System (TARS), founded 1852, was a streetcar system serving the New York City boroughs of Manhattan and the Bronx along with lower Westchester County. For a brief period of time, TARS also operated the Steinway Lines in Long Island City.

The conversion from streetcar to bus operation came from great pressure applied by New York City's Board of Transportation for a unified bus transportation system across the city. TARS applied for its first bus franchises in 1928. By 1948, all streetcar lines in Manhattan and The Bronx were converted to bus operation. The lines in Westchester County continued to operate, until the Yonkers city lines were shut down in 1952. Third Avenue Railway was purchased by New York City Omnibus Corporation in 1956, and transferred the remaining transit operating franchises to subsidiary Surface Transportation, Inc.

== Early history ==
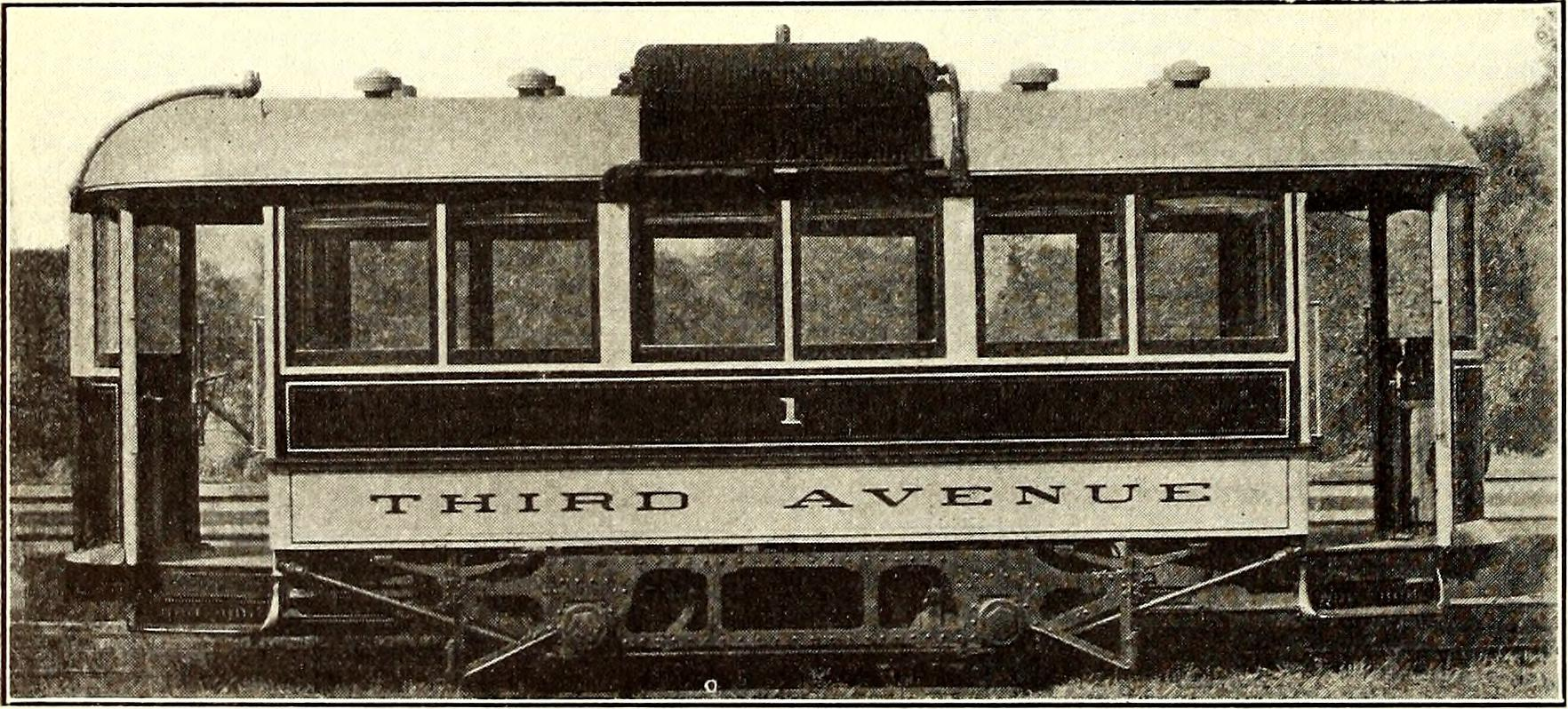
1909 3rd Avenue Gasoline-Electric streetcar.

The origins of the Third Avenue Railway System can be traced back to a simple horsecar line operated by the Third Avenue Railroad Company between City Hall and 62nd Street in Manhattan in 1853. By the 1870s, routes had been extended as far north as 129th Street and across the length of 125th Street. At its peak, more than 1,700 horses were stabled by the railway to keep up with demand. By 1885, Third Avenue Railroad had opened its first cable car line on Amsterdam Avenue. The 125th Street and Third Avenue lines were converted to cable car operation by 1893. The lines were converted to electric operation in 1899. Because of a ban on overhead trolley wires in Manhattan, streetcars collected power from a conduit in between the rails, by means of a plow, a method also used in Washington, D.C., and London. Some cars were equipped with trolley poles for operation on lines outside Manhattan into the Bronx. In many cases the conduit was run in the former channel occupied by the propulsion cable.

The Third Avenue Railroad expanded in 1898 with the acquisition of the Dry Dock, East Broadway and Battery Railroad and the Forty-Second Street, Manhattanville and St. Nicholas Railroad. Additional properties include the Belt Line Railway Corporation, the Mid-Crosstown Railway, the Brooklyn and North River Railroad (a joint operation with Brooklyn Rapid Transit, New York Railways, and TARS operating streetcars over the Manhattan Bridge), the Kingsbridge Railroad, the Westchester Electric Railroad, and the Yonkers Railroad:

- The Central Park, North and East River Railroad was formed in 1860. In 1912 the line was sold at foreclosure and the Belt Line Railway was incorporated in 1912 to take over. Third Avenue Railway assumed control in 1913, gaining the busy 59th Street crosstown line that extended from the Hudson River ferries across mid-town Manhattan to 10th Avenue.
- The Mid-Crosstown Railway was incorporated in 1912 to acquire the Twenty-Eighth and Twenty-Ninth Streets Crosstown Railroad, which was sold at foreclosure following the collapse of the Metropolitan Street Railway system. After a period of operating the line, Third Avenue Railway purchased the Mid-Crosstown Railway in 1914.
- The Kingsbridge Railway was chartered in 1898 to build a railway from Manhattan Street to the city line. An agreement was made with the New York City Railway in 1906 to operate their cars over Kingsbridge Railway tracks. With the collapse of the Metropolitan Street Railway in 1908, the agreement was terminated. Third Avenue Railway began leasing the Kingsbridge Railway the same year.
- The Dry Dock, East Broadway & Battery Railroad was chartered in 1863, and later came under the control of Third Avenue Railroad in 1897. The Avenue B and East Broadway Transit Company was formed independently of TARS in 1932 to operate buses over the same routes upon the termination of streetcar service. The bus operations were taken over by New York City Transit Authority in 1980.
- Chartered in 1878, the Forty-Second Street, Manhattanville & St. Nicholas Railway opened in 1884. Third Avenue Railroad acquired 42nd Street crosstown line in 1896. Electrification began in 1898, and was completed in 1901. The Third Avenue Bridge Company was formed in 1910 for the purpose of constructing and operating a streetcar line across the Queensboro Bridge to Long Island City. Operation over the bridge began in 1912 and placed under control of the FSSM&StN.
- The Union Railway was a consolidation of the Bronx Traction Company and the Southern Boulevard Railroad. By the turn of the century, Third Avenue Railroad controlled the majority of streetcar lines in Manhattan, as well as all service in The Bronx and lower Westchester County.

== After acquisition ==
The cost of rapid expansion led to financial problems, and Third Avenue Railroad came under the control of the Metropolitan Street Railway. The 1908 collapse of the Metropolitan Railway sent Third Avenue Railroad into foreclosure, with Frederick Wallingford Whitridge named receiver. Third Avenue Railway was chartered in 1910, and acquired the properties of the former Third Avenue Railroad, completing the transaction in 1912. In 1911, the New York City Interborough Railway streetcar lines were purchased from Interborough Rapid Transit, gaining complete control over all streetcar lines in The Bronx. In 1914 the Pelham Park and City Island Railway was acquired from Interborough Rapid Transit, further expanding the railway's reach into The Bronx. This extension was short-lived as the line ceased operation in 1919.

By 1915 Frederick Whitridge was president of the company. Labor unrest caused strikes that disrupted trolley service system-wide, and Whitridge and his policies were under scrutiny. Edward A. Maher succeeded Whitridge, but tendered his resignation at the end of 1917. Slaughter W. Huff, former vice president of the Brooklyn Rapid Transit Company, was elected to take over as president of TARS. Huff was an experienced transit executive, working his way through streetcar lines in California, Maryland, and Virginia, before returning to New York City. He was also the longest serving president of TARS.

=== Steinway Railway ===
The Steinway Railway Company was founded in 1892, as part of the development of Steinway Village, a company town located in Queens where Steinway pianos were manufactured. William Steinway died in 1896, and the streetcar lines were sold to the New York and Queens County Railway. A 1922 bankruptcy separated the Steinway Railway from the NY&QC, and Slaughter W. Huff, president of Third Avenue Railway, was named receiver. Equipment was leased from TARS in an effort to improve service, however, declining revenues and a failing physical plant made these attempts futile. By 1938, the streetcar operation had been converted to bus, and the Steinway Railway was sold to the Queensboro Bridge Railway Company and operated as subsidiary Steinway Omnibus. All leases with TARS ended in 1939 when the last of the Steinway lines was converted from streetcar to bus operation. The transit franchises are now operated by MTA Bus Company.

=== Westchester Electric Railroad ===
Chartered in 1891, the Westchester Electric Railroad was a subsidiary of the Union Railway, and made up the majority of the local streetcar lines in New Rochelle, Pelham, and Mount Vernon. The Mount Vernon and Eastchester Railway (an 1887 reorganization of the Mount Vernon and East Chester Rail Road founded in 1885) and the New Rochelle Railway and Transit Company (an 1890 reorganization of the New Rochelle and Pelham Railway founded in 1885 and the New Rochelle Street Horse Railroad founded in 1885) were merged into the Westchester Electric in 1893, which in turn was leased to the Union Railway. It came under control of Third Avenue Railway in 1898, the same year the Mount Vernon and New Rochelle operations were electrified. The main carbarn was located at Sanford Boulevard and Garden Avenue in Mount Vernon. A joint trolley terminal operated with the New York and Stamford Railway was located on Mechanic Street in New Rochelle. The company entered receivership in 1908, and emerged in 1912. Most of the local lines had been closed and converted to bus by 1931. Route J (Glen Island) and Route P (Webster Avenue) were converted to bus operation in June 1939. Route A (Main Street-New Rochelle) and Route B (Mount Vernon Railroad Station-229th Street) were the busiest lines and remained in operation until December 17, 1950.

=== Westchester Street Railroad Co. ===
The city of White Plains, the county seat of Westchester, marked TARS northernmost trolley operations. The Tarrytown Electric Co. had proposed a line starting from the New York Central Railroad station at Tarrytown, up Main Street, across Broadway on Nepperhan Road to Altamont Avenue, Rose Hill Avenue, and Benedict Avenue. The New York, Elmsford and White Plains Railway was chartered in 1892, and by June 1897 trolleys were running between White Plains and Glenville. By October of that year, the line was linked with the Tarrytown line, creating a continuous cross-county route to White Plains. It was purchased by the Union Railway in 1898 and renamed the Tarrytown, White Plains and Mamaroneck Street Railway. This operation was sold to the Third Avenue Railway in June 1900. The railway was sold at foreclosure to Richard Sutro, who set up the Westchester Street Railroad to take over the property. In 1910, control of the streetcar line was transferred to the New York, New Haven and Hartford Railroad. By the 1920s, both WSR and the New York and Stamford Railway were being managed by New Haven subsidiary New York, Westchester and Boston Railway. By this time the WSR consisted of a single-track line that ran from White Plains to Tarrytown along Tarrytown Road. One branch ran south from White Plains to Eastchester, while another spur ran to Silver Lake. The WSR was sold back to Third Avenue Railway in 1926, and renamed Westchester Street Transportation Company. On November 16, 1929, buses had replaced trolleys completely. The WST was acquired by Fifth Avenue Coach Lines in 1956 when it bought out the remaining TARS operation. In 1969 WST was acquired by Liberty Lines Transit and the transit franchises are now part of Westchester County's Bee-Line Bus System.

=== New York, Westchester & Connecticut Traction ===
Chartered in Westchester County in 1895 as the North Mount Vernon Street Railway, building local streetcar lines connecting Mount Vernon, Pelham, Eastchester, and Tuckahoe. Facing bankruptcy, the company was reorganized as the Interurban Street Railway which then leased Metropolitan Street Railway and renamed itself New York City Railways. The company entered receivership in 1908. Ownership of the franchise was directed by John Johnston Railroad Company until 1912 when lines were conveyed to the New York, Westchester & Connecticut Traction. This line was consolidated into the new Union Railway in 1908, which in turn came under the control of Third Avenue Railway. The NYW&CT was operated by TARS subsidiary Westchester Electric Railroad.

=== Yonkers Railroad Company ===
Incorporated in 1896, the Yonkers Railroad Company was the consolidation of the Yonkers Railroad, the North and South Electric Railway, and the Yonkers and Tarrytown Electric Railroad. The line was operated by Third Avenue Railway and consisted of nine routes serving New York State's third largest city.

- Line 1 (Broadway-Warburton Ave.) ran from a connection with the New York City Subway at 242nd Street and Broadway, through Getty Square, and north onto Warburton Avenue to the city limits.
- Line 2 (Broadway-Park Ave.) also ran north from 242nd Street to Getty Square, then turned to serve the steep hills of Palisades and Park avenues.
- Line 3 ran from the New York Central Railroad Hudson Division station at the foot of Main Street to the subway connection at 242nd Street.
- Line 4 (McLean Ave.) ran from the foot of Main Street along Broadway and McLean Avenue down to a connection with the Jerome Avenue Subway near Woodlawn Cemetery.
- Line 5 (Nepperhan Ave.) ran from the foot of Main Street through Getty Square to Palisade Avenue. At Elm is split from Line 2 to run as a single track down Nepperhan Avenue to Tomkins Avenue.
- Line 6 (Tuckahoe Rd.) ran along Saw Mill Road terminating at the New York Central's Putnam Division station at Nepperhan.
- Line 7 (Yonkers Ave.) ran east from downtown along Yonkers Avenue and terminated at the New York, New Haven and Hartford Railroad station in Mount Vernon.
- Line 8 (Riverdale Ave.) was a shuttle operation terminating at Main Street.
- Line 9 (Elm-Walnut) originated at the foot of Main Street, ran through Getty Square, and turned back on Elm and Walnut streets.

Litigation over the transit franchises extended streetcar service in Westchester County for years after the Manhattan and Bronx lines were converted. Routes in New Rochelle and Mount Vernon were closed in 1950, leaving only the Yonkers city lines in operation. Lines 5, 6, 8, and 9 were converted to bus on October 25, 1952. On November 1, Line 4 was closed. Lines 1, 2 and 3 followed the next day. On November 9, the streetcar era on TARS came to an end when Line 7 was shut down and converted to bus operation. The transit franchises were transferred to the new Yonkers Transit Corporation, organized by TARS general manager Samuel S. Schreiber. Liberty Lines Transit acquired Yonkers Transit Corporation in 1972, and continues to operate its routes as part of the Bee-Line Bus System.

The Yonkers Trolley Barn at the foot of Main Street, built by TARS in 1903 and listed on the National Register of Historic Places, is the only remaining such structure in the county.

== Conversion from trolley to bus (1924–1952) ==
As early as the 1920s, public officials were advocating for the increase in bus service as the answer to relieving traffic congestion in New York City. The Third Avenue Railway looked to buses in 1920 when the company made an application to operate a bus line on Dyckman Street, Nagle Avenue, and Tenth Avenue north to 207th Street as an extension of its existing trolley line that served Dyckman Ferry. In 1924 TARS formed the subsidiary Surface Transit Corporation. In Westchester County, the local streetcar lines in New Rochelle were some of the first to be converted to bus operation in 1939. Streetcars had a rocky history in New York City, losing favor by the 1930s. New York City mayor Fiorello LaGuardia did not feel that trolleys were agreeable to the modern image he was trying to portray. Operating franchises for trolleys were not renewed, leaving TARS with no choice but to convert to bus operation. While streamlined PCC trolley cars were introduced in nearby Brooklyn in 1936, TARS did not have the resources to procure new equipment. Instead, older trolleys were rebuilt with new aluminum bodies and reconditioned for extended service. The 138th Street crosstown line in The Bronx was discontinued in 1938.

By 1942 Surface Transportation System was operating one of the world's largest fleets of diesel-powered buses. In 1943, Third Avenue Railway System was renamed Third Avenue Transit System and had taken over direct operation of STS. After years of litigation regarding transit franchises and purchases of stock by board members, Victor McQuistion had taken control of the company by 1946, and implemented a plan to replace the remaining streetcar routes with buses. On November 10, buses replaced trolleys on the busy 59th Street crosstown line in Manhattan.

Third Avenue Transit made national news on March 28, 1947, when diesel bus 1310 and driver William Lawrence Cimillo went missing from its normal route and did not return to the garage. The bus was discovered in Hollywood, Florida, on March 31, when Cimillo sent a telegram back to headquarters in New York requesting cash. He was taken into custody by local police, and blamed mental fatigue for his momentary lapse in judgement. Cimillo and the bus were returned to New York, where the wayward driver was received as a celebrity. Further investigation revealed Cimillo had run up a substantial gambling debt. He was arraigned in Bronx County Court on larceny charges for stealing the bus, but given a suspended sentence. The company gave him a second chance and reinstated him as a driver a month later. The larceny charges were dropped in 1950, and Cimillo continued in his career without any further incident.

In 1948, Samuel S. Schreiber was appointed as general manager of the Third Avenue Transit Corporation. An experienced transit executive, he was hired to implement the orderly conversion of the remaining trolley lines to bus operation. Slowed briefly by wartime restrictions on gasoline and tires, all streetcar lines in Manhattan and the Bronx were converted to bus by the end of 1948. The remaining Mount Vernon and New Rochelle trolley lines followed on December 16, 1950. The last TARS streetcar operation came to an end in November 1952 with the closure of the former Yonkers Railroad lines.

== Bus transit operations (1952–1962) ==
Third Avenue Transit System continued operating its transit franchises through its subsidiary Surface Transportation Corporation after the end of rail service. A partnership between Third Avenue Transit System and New York City Omnibus Corporation created New York Management Ownership Corporation (NYMOC) in 1954. In 1955, parent The Omnibus Corporation sold its stakes in Fifth Avenue Coach Lines and New York City Omnibus to NYMOC. In 1956, New York City Omnibus Corporation bought out the remaining shares of Third Avenue Transit System and gained control of the Surface Transportation Corporation's bus transit routes. Surface Transportation Corporation was dissolved and Third Avenue Transit was renamed Surface Transit, Incorporated. The same year, New York City Omnibus changed its name to Fifth Avenue Coach Lines.

In 1962, all Fifth Avenue Coach Lines routes were taken over by the Manhattan and Bronx Surface Transit Operating Authority following a crippling transit strike. The majority of the transit franchises are now operated by MTA Bus Company. Fifth Avenue Coach Lines continued to own and operate the old TARS subsidiary Westchester Street Transportation Company in White Plains until it was sold to Liberty Lines Transit in 1969. Compensation for the condemnation of its bus routes in New York City was paid in 1970, and Fifth Avenue Coach Lines emerged from receivership in 1971. It was reorganized as the South Bay Corporation in 1973, a privately held investment group.

== Disposition of rail equipment ==
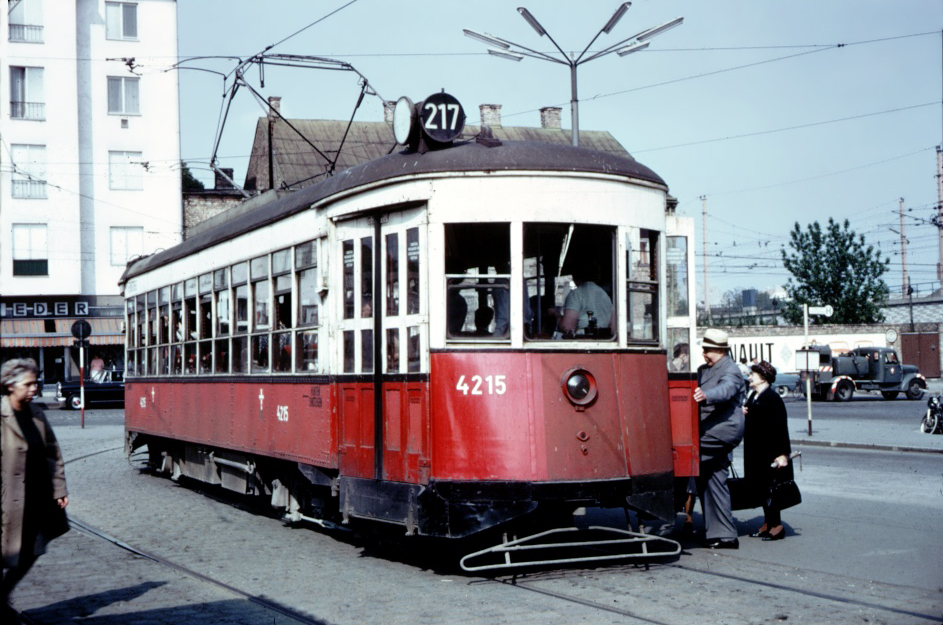
An ex-Third Avenue car in service in Vienna, Austria, in 1955

After the system's abandonment, 42 cars of the largest and newest type, built by TARS itself in 1938–1939 (on Brill trucks), were sold to the operator of the Vienna, Austria, streetcar system, Wiener Stadtwerke Verkehrsbetriebe (now Wiener Linien), for operation there. They were renumbered, designated Vienna type "Z" and fitted with pantographs in place of their trolley poles. They did not use conduit current collection in Vienna. They entered service there in 1949–1950, exclusively on the 17/217/317 single track suburban service to Gross-Enzersdorf. They were too wide to run on double track city lines. They were retired in 1969 when track brakes became mandatory.

=== Surviving equipment ===
A number of cars formerly operated by TARS have been preserved.

- 24, Brill open car, Electric City Trolley Museum
- 220, converted cable car
- 316, American standard, Shore Line Trolley Museum
- 629 (was Vienna 4239), lightweight, Shore Line Trolley Museum
- 631 (was Vienna 4216), lightweight, Seashore Trolley Museum
- Vienna 4234 (ex TARS 634), lightweight, Mariazell, Austria
- Vienna 4202 (ex TARS 637), lightweight, Graz, Austria
- Vienna 4242 (ex TARS 640), lightweight, Mariazell, Austria
- 674 (was Vienna 4225), lightweight, Crich Tramway Village, Derbyshire, United Kingdom
- 678 (was Vienna 4220), lightweight, National Capital Trolley Museum
- Vienna 4208 (ex TARS 679), lightweight, Verkehrsmuseum Remise, Vienna
- 830, 884, Shore Line Trolley Museum
- 1043, Brill semi-convertible, Western Railway Museum
- 1779, Peter Witt streetcar, Sorocaba, Brazil
- 1789, 1791, Peter Witt, São Paulo, Brazil
- 1799, Peter Witt, Bertioga, Brazil

== Lines ==
=== Manhattan ===
The following lines existed in later days:

- 10 Tenth Avenue Line: 42nd Street, 10th Avenue, Broadway, and 125th Street from West 42nd Street Ferry to West 130th Street Ferry, now partially covered by the M11, and M104
- B Broadway Line: 42nd Street, Broadway, and 125th Street from East 42nd Street Ferry to West 130th Street Ferry, now M104
- K Broadway-Kingsbridge Line: East Harlem to the Bronx, now M100, Bronx portion of route discontinued north of W 220 Street, now covered by the Bx7 as of 1984, Manhattan portion of route discontinued east of St. Nicholas Avenue
- T Third and Amsterdam Avenues Line: Park Row, Bowery, 3rd Avenue, 125th Street, and Amsterdam Avenue from City Hall to Fort George, now M101/M103
- X 42nd Street Crosstown Line, formerly M106, now M42
- X 59th Street Crosstown Line, formerly M103, discontinued September 1, 1989
- X 125th Street Crosstown Line, now combined with Willis Avenue route, formerly Bx29, currently Bx15, and M125 as of July 2022.

=== The Bronx ===
The following lines operated in The Bronx. The final streetcar lines were converted to bus operation in 1948.

- A Westchester Avenue, formerly Bx42 – now Bx4/Bx4A
- B Bailey Avenue, formerly Bx24 – now mostly covered by Bx10
- B Boston Road, formerly Bx26 – now Bx21
- C Bronx-Van Cortlandt Park Crosstown, formerly Bx20 – now Bx9
- L St. Anns Avenue, formerly Bx32 – route discontinued in 1984. due to poor ridership
- O Ogden Avenue, formerly Bx37 – now Bx13
- S Sedgwick Avenue, now combined with University Avenue route, formerly Bx38 – now Bx3
- S Southern Boulevard, now combined with 149th Street Crosstown, formerly Bx31 – now Bx19
- T Tremont Avenue, currently Bx40/Bx42, Bx36/Bx36LTD effective July 2022
- U University Avenue, now combined with Sedgwick Avenue route, formerly Bx38 – now Bx3
- V Williamsbridge, formerly Bx28 – now Bx39, extended to Wakefield to cover White Plains Road portion of Bx41/Bx41SBS on June 28, 2009
- W Webster Avenue-White Plains Avenue, now Bx41/Bx41SBS, White Plains Road portion of line discontinued, and is now covered by the Bx39 as of June 28, 2009
- X 138th Street Crosstown, now Bx33
- X 149th Street Crosstown, now combined with Southern Boulevard, formerly Bx31 – now Bx19
- X 163rd Street Crosstown, formerly Bx34 – now Bx6
- X 167th Street Crosstown, now Bx35
- Z 180th Street Crosstown, currently Bx36, Bx40/Bx42 effective July 2022

=== New Rochelle and Mount Vernon ===
The following lines operated in New Rochelle, New York and Mount Vernon, New York, until they were converted to bus operation in 1950.

- A Main Street, New Rochelle, to Subway/241st Street – Closed 1950
- B Mount Vernon Railroad Station to Subway/241st Street – Closed 1950
- J Glen Island – Closed 1930
- P Webster Avenue – Closed 1939

=== Yonkers ===
The following lines operated in Yonkers, New York. All were converted to bus operation in 1952.

1. Broadway-Warburton
2. Broadway-Park Ave.
3. Broadway
4. McLean Ave.
5. Nepperhan Ave.
6. Tuckahoe Road
7. Yonkers Ave.
8. Riverdale Ave.
9. Elm-Walnut Sts.

== Affiliated companies ==
- Third Avenue Railway Company
- The Forty-Second Street, Manhattanville and St. Nicholas Railway
- The Dry Dock, East Broadway and Battery Railroad
- Belt Line Railway
- Union Railway Company of New York City
- Southern Boulevard Railroad
- New York City Interborough Railway
- Westchester Electric Railroad
- Yonkers Railroad
- New York, Westchester and Connecticut Traction
- Kingsbridge Railway
- Third Avenue Bridge Company
- Bronx Traction Company
- Pelham Park and City Island Railway

== See also ==
- Berkey v. Third Avenue Railway Co
