= New York City Interborough Railway =

The New York City Interborough Railway was a streetcar transit system chartered in 1902 to construct feeder lines to serve Interborough Rapid Transit's subway and elevated stations in the Bronx. The streetcar lines were given permission to cross the Harlem River to gain access to the Manhattan lines. The railway opened for business in 1906, and came under direct control of Interborough Rapid Transit in 1910. An agreement was reached with Third Avenue Railway to purchase the franchises and continue operating streetcar service in 1911.
