= Soundview Transportation Company =

Soundview Transportation Company was a private bus transit operation based in White Plains, New York, founded by Charles E. Gill in 1921.

== Routes ==
The first route originating at the New York Central Railroad station in White Plains was approved by the White Plains Common Council in 1922. The New York, Westchester and Boston Railway acquired control of Soundview Transportation in 1928, and established new feeder bus routes to serve its White Plains, Gedney Way, and Heathcote train stations.

== Later history ==
Control of Soundview Transportation passed to corporate parent New York, New Haven and Hartford Railroad in 1938 when the NYW&B ceased operations. By this time STC was operated by County Transportation Company. In 1948, the New Haven sold Soundview Transportation, and the name of the operation was changed to White Plains Bus Company in 1950.

== See also ==
- New York and Stamford Railway
