= Union Railway (Bronx) =

Former operator of New York street car lines

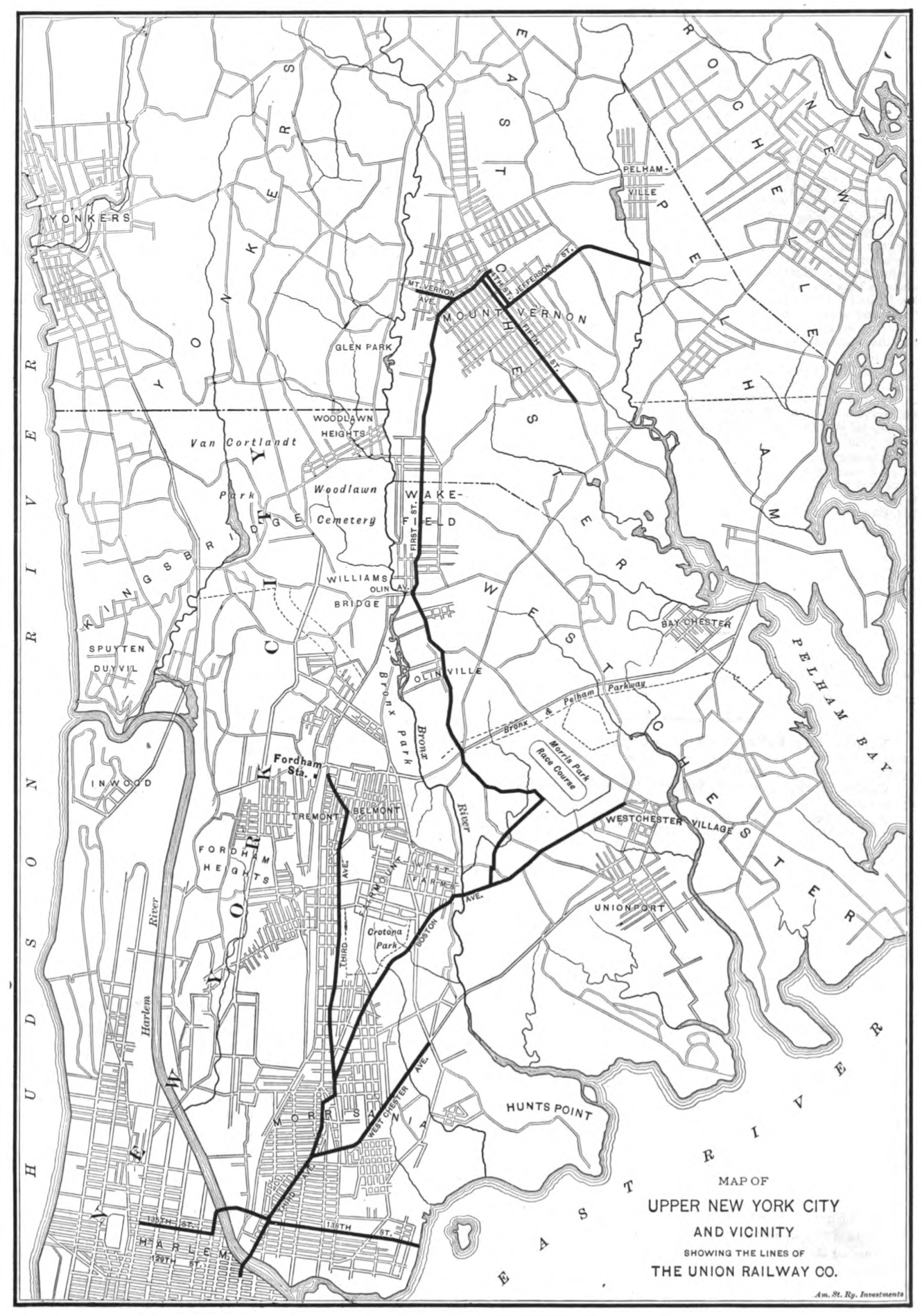
New York City Union Railway Company c 1894

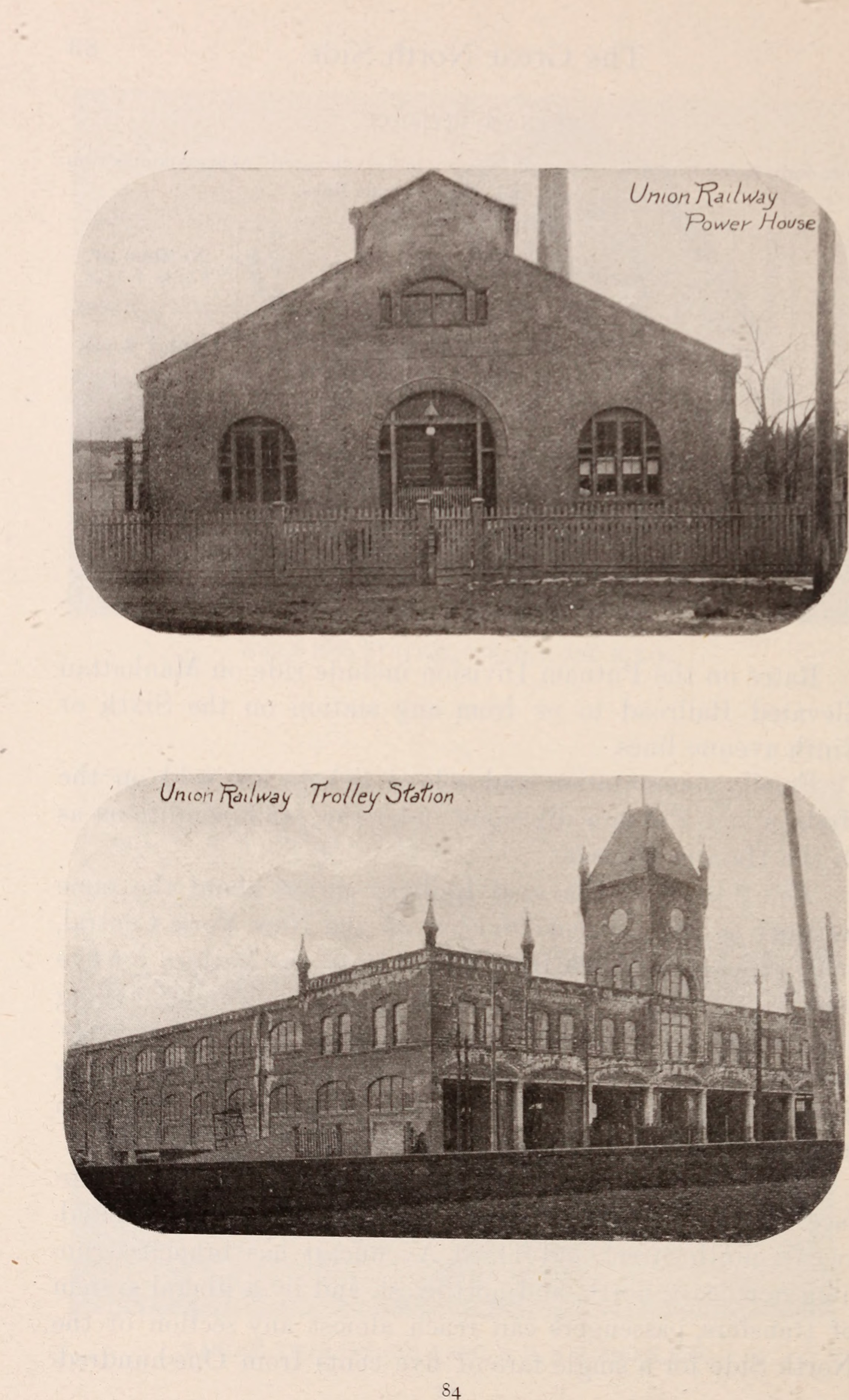
Union Railway Power House (top) and Trolley Station (bottom)

The Union Railway Company of New York City (often shortened to Union Railway) was chartered in 1892, and consolidated several streetcar transit franchises across Manhattan and The Bronx in New York City in the late 19th century. The Harlem Bridge, Morrisania and Fordham Railway (established in 1863) combined with the North Third Avenue and Fleetwood Park Railway and the Melrose and West Morrisania Railroad to form the nucleus of the Union Railway in 1892. All lines were electrified the same year. Union Railway was acquired by Third Avenue Railroad Company in 1898, which was later reorganized as the Third Avenue Railway.

== Bronx Traction Company ==
The Bronx Traction Company was formed in 1904 to consolidate the West Farms and Westchester Traction Company, the Wakefield and Westchester Traction Company, the Williamsbridge and Westchester Traction Company, the Van Nest, West Farms and Westchester Traction Company, and the Suburban Traction Company. Bronx Traction was leased to the Union Railway, which was in turn acquired by Third Avenue Railway.

== Southern Boulevard Railroad ==
Chartered in 1885, the Southern Boulevard Railroad came under the control of the Union Railway, and subsequently operated by Third Avenue Railway after 1898. No rolling stock was assigned to this line, with all equipment and employees provided by the Union Railway.

== Westchester County ==
Formed in 1898 to take over the old New York, Elmsford and White Plains Railway, the Tarrytown, White Plains and Mamaroneck Railway connected its namesake cities in suburban Westchester County. Acquired by the Union Railway, it was sold to Third Avenue Railway in 1900.
