= Bee-Line Bus System =

Bus system in Westchester County, New York

Westchester County Bee-Line System

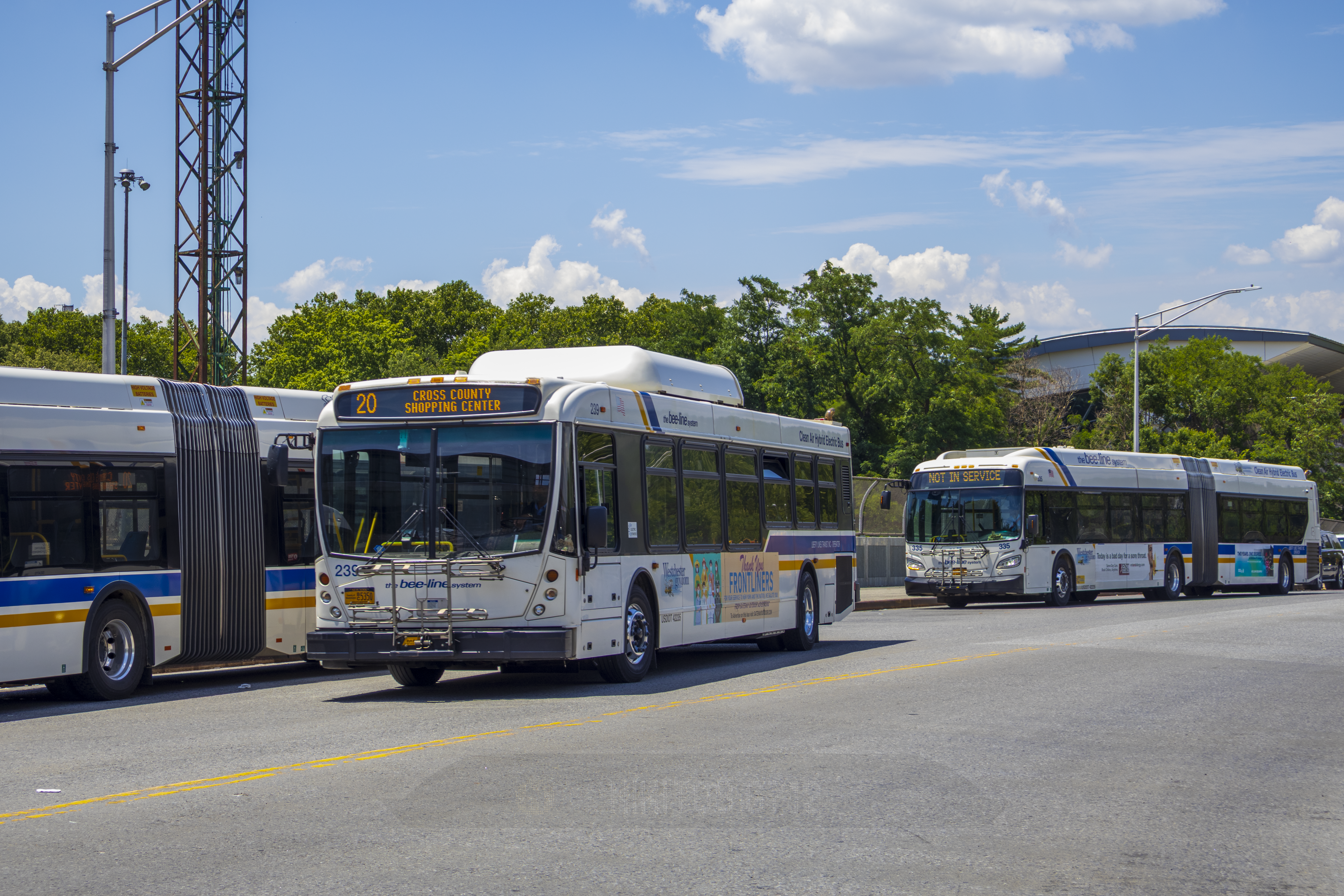
- 2 XDE60s and 1 NABI are stored at the Bedford Park #4 Subway Station. Seen here is also a 2009 NABI doing a run on the 20 bus.
- Parent: Westchester County Department of Public Works and Transportation
- Founded: May 1, 1978
- Headquarters: 100 East First Street, 9th Floor; Mount Vernon, NY 10550
- Locale: Westchester County, New York
- Service area: Westchester County, New York and Putnam County, New York; The Bronx and Manhattan in New York City; and Greenwich, Connecticut
- Service type: Local, Limited, express, shuttle buses
- Routes: 64
- Fleet: 327 fixed route 91 paratransit
- Daily ridership: 81,613 (2024)
- Fuel type: Diesel, Diesel-electric hybrid
- Operator: Liberty Lines Transit, Inc. (all fixed routes except 16, 18, and 31); P.T.L.A. Enterprise, Inc. (16, 18 and 31); Suburban Paratransit Service (Mobico Group subsidiary) (paratransit)
- Chief executive: Hugh J. Greechan, Jr., P.E., Commissioner
- Website: Bee-Line Bus System

The Westchester County Bee-Line System, branded on the buses in lowercase as the bee-line system, is a bus system serving Westchester County, New York. The system is owned by the county's Department of Public Works and Transportation.

== History ==
The system was founded on May 1, 1978, by the then Westchester County Department of Transportation to consolidate the bus system with thirteen private bus companies and has been given control over the buses, fare structure, routes, and services. By the 1980s, the bus system had an identity problem in who was providing the service. On May 19, 1987, WCDOT officially named the bus service "The Bee-Line System" with a 'bee-in-flight' mascot drawn by cartoonist Jack Davis.

The Westchester County Department of Public Works and Transportation currently contracts out to two private bus companies to provide service in Westchester County and the surrounding counties: Yonkers-based Liberty Lines Transit, Inc., the main company that either bought out or obtained franchises from the other twelve bus companies over the years, operates buses on all but three bus routes; and Cortlandt Manor-based P.T.L.A. Enterprise, Inc., a small company that operates buses on routes 16, 18, and 31.

== Scope of service ==
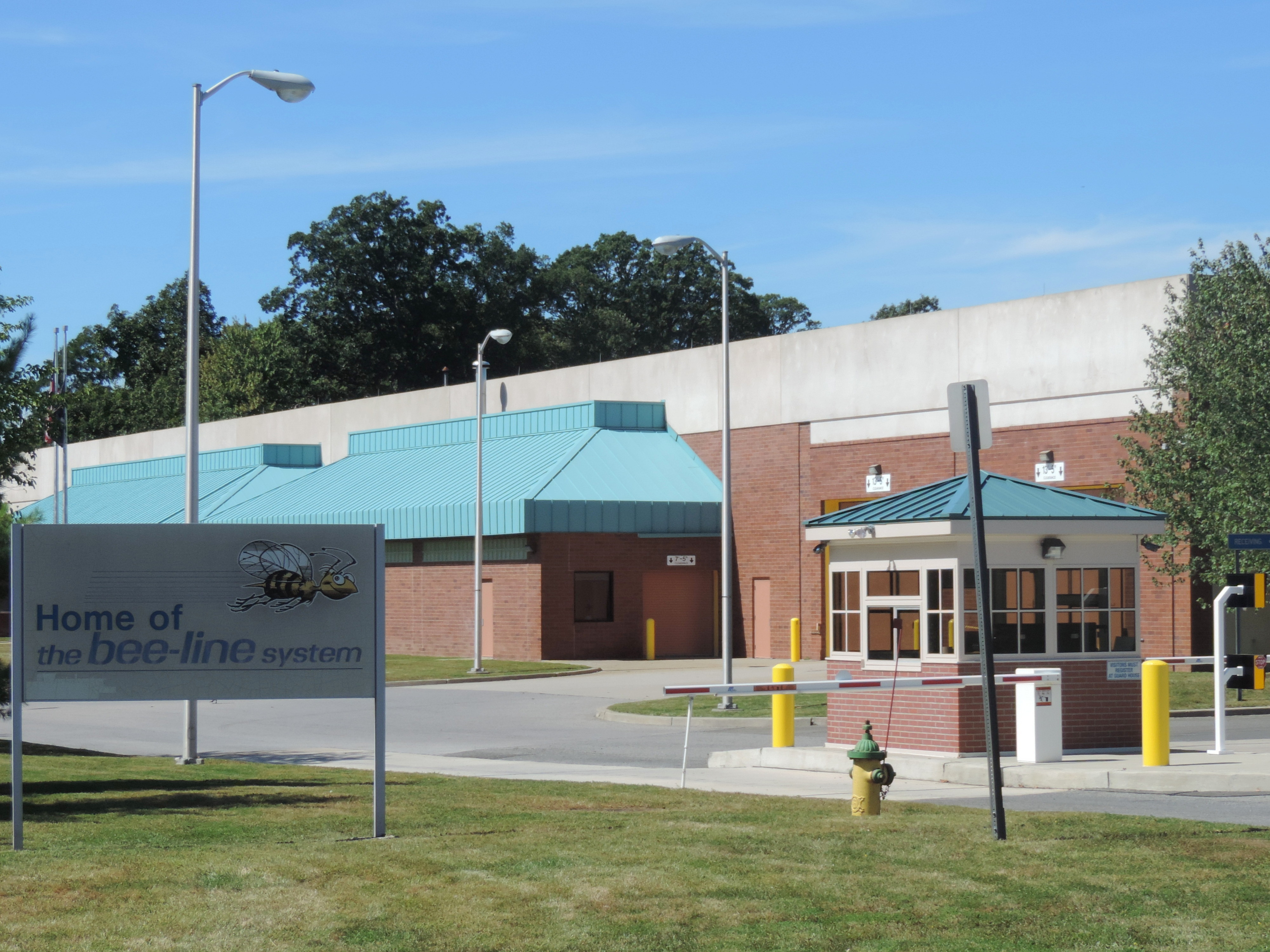
The Cerrato Satellite Bus Facility in Valhalla

Most Bee-Line routes operate seven days a week throughout the year. Until 2024, there was no service county-wide on two days of the calendar year: Thanksgiving (the fourth Thursday in November), and Christmas (December 25). Starting in 2025, Bee-Line will operate limited service on these holidays.

=== Within Westchester ===
The system's 64 routes are mostly concentrated in the more urban southern portion of the county, with the cities of Mount Vernon, New Rochelle, and Yonkers receiving a high frequency of service. White Plains, the county seat and most centrally located city, is a major transportation hub with many routes converging on the city's TransCenter.

Service in the northern portion of Westchester is sparse and is concentrated near slightly populated areas such as Mount Kisco, Ossining, or Peekskill. Areas such as Lewisboro, North Salem, and Pound Ridge receive paratransit service only. During the school year, special bus routes also operate. All but the county's smallest, most rural communities have at least rush hour service.

=== Outside Westchester ===
Because Westchester County borders on the New York City borough of the Bronx, many of the Bee-Line's routes operate into the Bronx, offering Westchester residents connections to MTA New York City Transit buses and subways; at least one Bee-Line route connects to each subway route serving the Bronx. The Bee-Line System also operates an express route, the BxM4C from White Plains, Greenburgh, Hartsdale, Scarsdale, and Yonkers along Central Park Avenue to Fifth Avenue in Manhattan (return trips operate on Madison Avenue within Manhattan).

Bee-Line operates mostly closed-door service in the Bronx (local service is not provided solely for travel within the Bronx; appropriate MTA Regional Bus Operations service must be used instead). The only exceptions are:

- Routes 40, 41, 42 and 43, which run along White Plains Road north of the Wakefield – 241st Street subway terminal;
- Route 45, which serves the Pelham Bay Park subway terminal, the Pelham Bay and Split Rock Golf Course, and the Bartow-Pell Mansion;
- Route 54, which runs on Mundy Lane along the Bronx/Mount Vernon border, since no other bus routes travel entirely through these areas;
- Routes 60 and 61, which run along US Route 1 (East Fordham and Boston roads in the Bronx).

In addition, Route 12 briefly enters Greenwich, Connecticut along King Street, in which it makes stops in Greenwich and Rye Brook, New York along the New York/Connecticut border; Route 16 briefly enters Putnam County to serve the Mahopac Village Centre; and Route 77 enters Putnam County to serve the US Route 6 corridor between Mahopac and Carmel.

== Fares ==
All fares require exact change or OMNY. All transfers are free with payment of fare. Coins and $1, $2, $5, and $10 bills are also accepted.

Route	Full fare	Senior/ disabled fare	Transfer All transfers good for 2 hours
All except BxM4C	$3.00	$1.50	Cash: Valid on MTA Bus local buses, NYC Transit local, limited stop, and Select Bus Service buses, CT Transit, or Putnam Transit; OMNY: free to MTA local buses, subways, and other Bee-Line services; $3.85 "step-up" charge for transferring to an MTA Bus express route; After paying $35 ($17.50 for reduced-fare customers) within seven days of an initial tap, customers receive unlimited rides for the rest of that seven-day period.
BxM4C	$7.75	$3.85 (Off peak only)	No transfers accepted or issued.
Notes: All customers transferring to Hudson Link, CT Transit's 971 or Route 311/311B, or Putnam Transit must use a paper transfer.; There is a $1.25 "step-up" charge for customers transferring from CT Transit Route 311/311B to Bee-Line buses in Port Chester.; For the BxM4C, off-peak is: first two and last two departures to Manhattan; First departure and last four departures from Manhattan; Bee-Line Bus and Metro-North Connections: UniTicket is a monthly train-to-bus, reduced-rate ticket that combines monthly round-trip local bus service with train fare. UniTicket is available for purchase at any Metro-North ticket office. It is accepted for one fare to/from the railroad station listed on the ticket. A transfer may not be purchased when boarding with a UniTicket.

Bee-Line Bus started accepting MetroCard on April 1, 2007. The fare for the BxM4C went down from $7 to $5. The regular fare was $2 for MetroCard, and $1.75 if paid in cash. Dollar bills, passports, and ticket books were no longer accepted for fare payment after this date. MetroCard Vans made stops on heavily used routes to help people get ready for the MetroCard. On July 23, 2019, it was announced that the Bee-Line bus fare system on all buses would be upgraded to the OMNY fare system in 2021–2022, replacing the MetroCard. Throughout late 2025, OMNY card readers were slowly installed on buses. On January 4, 2026, OMNY officially became usable on Bee Line Buses along with a fare increase to $3.00. In summer 2026, fare machines on buses were replaced with newer ones that lacked MetroCard slots but allowed for dollar bills to be used as fare payment, bringing back dollar bills as payment for the Bee Line Bus System.

For certain periods during the summer and winter of 2022, the buses were fare-free. During the summers of 2023 and 2024, buses were fare free until Labor Day.

== Fleet ==
=== Active fleet ===
As of 2025, the Bee-Line System had 325 buses in its fleet, of which 40 were diesel vehicles and the rest were hybrid or electric vehicles. This roster only lists buses and shuttle vans used in fixed route service. Paratransit vehicles are not listed. All buses are wheelchair accessible.

Fleet numbers	Year	Photo	Manufacturer	Model	Length	Width	Engines	Transmission
116–136	2005		Orion Bus Industries	Orion V 05.505	32 ft (9.8 m)	96 in (2.4 m)	Detroit Diesel Series 50 EGR	Allison B400R
801–830	2008		Orion Bus Industries	Orion V 05.501	40 ft (12 m)	102 in (2.6 m)	Cummins ISL	Allison B400R
205-299	2009		North American Bus Industries	NABI 40-LFW HEV	40 ft (12 m)	102 in (2.6 m)	Cummins ISL9	Allison E^{P}40 Hybrid System
301–378	2018–2020		New Flyer Industries	Xcelsior XDE60 articulated	60 ft (18 m)	102 in (2.6 m)	Cummins L9	BAE Systems HDS300 hybrid system
100–106	2023		New Flyer Industries	Xcelsior XDE35	35 ft (11 m)	102 in (2.6 m)	Cummins B6.7	BAE Systems HDS200 hybrid system
107-111	2026		New Flyer Industries	Xcelsior XDE35	35 ft (11 m)	102 in (2.6 m)	Cummins B6.7	Allison eGen Flex H 40 hybrid system
141–144	2021		New Flyer Industries	Xcelsior XE35	35 ft (11 m)	102 in (2.6 m)	Siemens HV1DB2016	Siemens ELFA2
145–146	2021	XE40 on the 66	New Flyer Industries	Xcelsior XE40	40 ft (12 m)	102 in (2.6 m)	Siemens HV1DB2016	Siemens ELFA2
398–503	2021–2022		New Flyer Industries	Xcelsior XDE40	40 ft (12 m)	102 in (2.6 m)	Cummins L9	BAE Systems HDS200 hybrid system
504–515	2023–2024		New Flyer Industries	Xcelsior XDE40	40 ft (12 m)	102 in (2.6 m)	Cummins L9	BAE Systems HDS200 hybrid system
516-610	2026-2027		New Flyer Industries	Xcelsior XDE40	40 ft (12 m)	102 in (2.6 m)	Cummins B6.7	Allison eGen Flex H 40 hybrid system

=== Future fleet ===
In February 2020, it was announced that Westchester County's Bee-Line Bus fleet would be expanding with 78 hybrid-electric 60-foot buses (all delivered by summer 2020), 106 hybrid-electric 40-foot buses and two 40-foot battery-electric buses – all built by New Flyer Industries – under a plan to have the entire transit bus fleet running on either fully electric or diesel-electric hybrid technology by 2025. As of July 2020, 106 40-foot diesel-electric buses and two 40-foot battery-electric are planned to be delivered between 2021 and 2025. Four 35-foot battery-electric buses are also planned to be delivered, totaling 6 battery-electric buses by 2025.

In 2026, Bee-Line has awarded a contract to New Flyer for 116 40 foot XDE40's, and 5 XDE35's to replace the NABI 40-LFW fleets and as well as Orion V Suburban and Shortie fleet currently running under Liberty Lines and P.T.L.A Enterprises, Inc.

As of July 22, 2026, 107 has been delivered to Yonkers Garage.

As of September 4th, 2026, 516 has been delivered. https://www.instagram.com/p/DayJP6HRwFt/
