= Ossining Electric Railway =

Overview
- Headquarters: Ossining, New York
- Locale: Ossining, New York
- Dates of operation: 1893–1926
- Successor: Westchester Traction Co. Hudson River and Eastern Traction Co.

Technical
- Track gauge: 4 ft 8 1/2 in (1,435 mm)
- Electrification: 600v DC

The Ossining Electric Railway was a streetcar transit line that operated in northern Westchester County. Chartered in 1892 as the Ossining Street Railway, the first section of the line opened in 1893, starting at the New York Central Railroad station at Ossining, and terminating at the Methodist Meeting Grounds (later Camp Woods ) 1.8 miles away. There was also a short branch off Main Street to Sparta Hill. The town purchased the company in 1897 for unpaid taxes and continued operation until 1902 when the Westchester Traction Company took control. The new company announced an ambitious project to build a new line to White Plains as well as a route to Port Chester, but the only extension built was from Sparta Hill to Ossining Hospital. Westchester Traction Company took control of the Danbury and Harlem Traction Company project, which was only partially constructed between Danbury, Connecticut, and North Salem, New York, and never put into operation. The Industrial Contracting Company was hired to construct the Danbury and Harlem line as well as the extension of the Ossining Electric Railway. Considerable grading and some track construction took place on the Danbury line, but no evidence of construction on the Ossining line could be found.

In July 1906, the railroad suspended service while it made repairs to its powerhouse and other properties, but quickly determined by August that they could not afford to complete the work. The line was abandoned on October 20 and the rails were removed and scrapped by the town. The affiliated Danbury and Harlem Traction Co. had not seen any construction progress beyond roadbed grading from North Salem to Goldens Bridge. Its rails were removed sometime between 1910 and 1915.

Established in February 1906, the Hudson River and Eastern Traction Company began construction of a new line over the same route in 1907. The new railway included a branch on Spring Street. Permission was secured in 1911 to construct a 17-mile extension running through Briarcliff Manor, Pleasantville, Sherman Park, and White Plains, but construction never began. Revenues declined through the 1920s until the railway was purchased by the Westchester Coach Co. in 1926. All trolley service was converted to bus operation immediately after.
