= Mid-Island, Staten Island =

Area in New York City

Coordinates: 40.595°N 74.182°W

Mid-Island is frequently applied to a series of neighborhoods within the New York City borough of Staten Island.

Community District Tabulation Area Mid-Island (SI02) with neighborhoods of Arrochar, Bulls Head, Dongan Hills, Emerson Hill, Freshkills Park (North), Grasmere, Lighthouse Hill, Manor Heights, Midland Beach, New Dorp, New Springville, South Beach, Todt Hill, Travis, Willowbrook and Miller's Field from SI95'"`UNIQ--ref-00000005-QINU`"'

Under the definition most commonly adhered to, Mid-Island comprises all of the communities whose ZIP Code is 10314, plus Sunnyside within ZIP Code 10301, along with the western slope of Todt Hill. Mid-Island communities thus include Graniteville, Bulls Head, Willowbrook, and New Springville, Sometimes the localities situated along the Arthur Kill between the Staten Island Expressway and the Fresh Kills — Bloomfield, Chelsea and Travis — are said to be on the island's West Shore; otherwise they too would fall within Mid-Island as their ZIP Code is 10314.

Like all of Staten Island except for the North Shore, farms dominated the Mid-Island region until the 1960s, when new home construction began to rise sharply. The opening of the Verrazzano–Narrows Bridge in 1964 did much to stimulate this construction, but the effects of this phenomenon were first seen most profoundly on the East Shore, not spreading inland until nearly the end of the decade. In addition to starting somewhat later, the population boom experienced in Mid-Island also exhibited some important demographic differences from that which took place to the east, as in Mid-Island Jewish transplants (from Queens as well as Brooklyn) tended to predominate, in contrast to the heavily Italian-American influx experienced on the East Shore. These demographic differences are not present today with mostly Italian-Americans dominating the area.

The ZIP Code 10314, which covers much of the Mid-Island area has the largest percentage of Asians of any ZIP Code on Staten Island, at 13.3% Non-hispanic Asian.

The Mid-Island region's character was transformed dramatically in 1973, when the Staten Island Mall opened in New Springville, on a site that was originally used as an airport. This led to the Richmond Avenue corridor, from New Springville to Graniteville, becoming the island's liveliest commercial strip, spawning much traffic congestion in the area; even during midday hours on weekdays, traffic is typically moderate to heavy along Richmond Avenue and Victory Boulevard, which intersects Richmond Avenue in Bulls Head.

Besides the Staten Island Mall, other prominent landmarks found within Mid-Island include the former Willowbrook State School (now a campus of the City University of New York), St. Francis Seminary (on the property of which the highest point on Staten Island is located), and the former New York City Farm Colony adjacent to Sea View Hospital and Home, a city-run nursing home. Most of Mid-Island lies within the NYPD's 122nd Precinct, headquartered in the East Shore community of New Dorp, a considerable distance away; however, in 2005 the city approved plans to build a fourth police precinct on the island (which presently has three), with the new precinct's station house to be built at 974 Richmond Avenue, near Forest Avenue and the Baron Hirsh Cemetery.

The MTA has the Yukon Avenue Bus Depot in New Springville.

== List of neighborhoods in Mid-Island ==
- Arrochar
- Bloomfield
- Bulls Head
- Chelsea
- Dongan Hills
- Egbertville
- Emerson Hill
- Graniteville
- Grant City
- Grasmere
- Heartland Village
- Midland Beach
- New Dorp
- New Springville
- Oakwood
- Ocean Breeze
- Old Town
- Richmondtown
- South Beach
- Todt Hill
- Travis
- Willowbrook
