= Heartland Village, Staten Island =

Residential development in New York City

Coordinates: 40°35′20″N 74°09′24″W

Heartland Village is a residential development located close to the geographic center of Staten Island, one of the five boroughs of New York City, USA. The name is also often used to denote the immediately surrounding area.

Heartland Village is located within the New Springville neighborhood of Staten Island. Heartland Village is originally named for a housing development created in the late 1960s which occupied a square-shaped area bounded by Richmond Avenue, Rockland Avenue, Richmond Hill Road, and Forest Hill Road, exclusive of the various shopping centers also located therein. The Staten Island Mall is located south of Richmond Hill Road.

Heartland Village's proximity to the Staten Island Mall and many other smaller shopping centers nearby has made it one of the island's most attractive residential communities; indeed, the region has emerged as the island's second largest commercial and administrative hub, after St. George.

== History ==
New Springville was originally a rural and wooded community. The construction of the Verrazzano–Narrows Bridge (opened in 1964) led to the establishment on Staten Island of many large residential development communities. One of the largest development communities to emerge was the Heartland Village community. Construction of the Heartland Village Community started in the late 1960s and would continue through the early 1980s.

Most of the homes in Heartland Village consist of two family homes with six or seven rooms in the main home, with three bedrooms. These are medium-sized homes. In recent years, with most new construction has been focused on larger homes or condominiums, these medium-sized homes have become particularly desirable.

== Education ==
With the increasing residential population, a need arose for new schools to be built in the community. In 1976, two such schools opened: An elementary school, P.S. 69, the Daniel D. Tompkins School and I.S. 72, the Rocco Laurie Intermediate School.

== Transportation ==
Heartland Village is served by various local and express buses. The S44, S94, S59 and S89 local buses and SIM4, SIM4X, SIM8 and SIM8X express buses travel along Richmond Avenue. The S61 and S91 local buses and SIM31 express buses run along Travis Avenue and Merry Mount Street.

== Demographics ==
For census purposes, the New York City Department of City Planning classifies Heartland Village as part of a larger Neighborhood Tabulation Area called Todt Hill-Emerson Hill-Lighthouse Hill-Manor Heights SI0203. This designated neighborhood had 32,822 inhabitants based on data from the 2020 United States Census. This was an increase of 1,971 persons (6.4%) from the 30,851 counted in 2010. The neighborhood had a population density of 7.8 inhabitants per acre (14,500/sq mi; 5,600/km^{2}).

The racial makeup of the neighborhood was 62.8% (20,597) White (Non-Hispanic), 4.1% (1,348) Black (Non-Hispanic), 19.8% (6,486) Asian, and 3% (971) from two or more races. Hispanic or Latino of any race were 10.4% (3,420) of the population.

According to the 2020 United States Census, this area has many cultural communities of over 1,000 inhabitants. This include residents who identify as Puerto Rican, German, Irish, Italian, Indian, and Chinese.

The largest age group was people 55-74 years old, which made up 24.9% of the residents. 75.1% of the households had at least one family present. Out of the 10,623 households, 57.1% had a married couple (22.4% with a child under 18), 3.1% had a cohabiting couple (1.2% with a child under 18), 14.3% had a single male (1.6% with a child under 18), and 25.4% had a single female (3.9% with a child under 18). 32.7% of households had children under 18. In this neighborhood, 30.3% of non-vacant housing units are renter-occupied.
