= Graniteville, Staten Island =

Neighborhood in New York City

Coordinates: 40°37′30″N 74°08′56″W

Graniteville is a place in Staten Island, one of the five boroughs of New York City.

== History ==
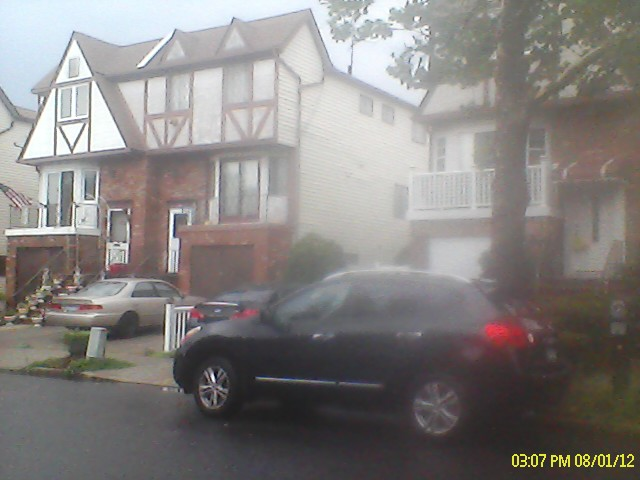
Residential street in Graniteville

Graniteville was originally named Bennett's Corners and Fayetteville. Quarries for trap rock were operated in the area from 1841 to 1896, leading to the community's name being changed first to Granite Village, then Graniteville.

According to College of Staten Island professor, geologist Alan Benimoff, this name is a misnomer, as the quarry actually contained no granite. Granite is made of potassium feldspar. The rock at the quarry is composed of sodium feldspar. Also, professor Benimoff discovered trondhjemite at the site, a rare mineral.

Largely undeveloped well into the 20th century, Graniteville was the scene of a notable fire in March 1942, when an explosion at the Consolidated Fireworks Company on Richmond Avenue claimed the lives of five employees.

Bisected from east to west by the Staten Island Expressway and with New York State Route 440 forming its eastern boundary, Graniteville's most notable landmark is Baron Hirsch Cemetery, an 80-acre (324,000 m²) Jewish cemetery founded in the late 19th century and still in active use; in August 2001 this cemetery became the focus of a local health-related story when it was one of six locations on the island where mosquitos carrying the West Nile virus were discovered.

Residential development in the area burgeoned soon after the Verrazzano–Narrows Bridge opened in November 1964, and today Graniteville stands at the north end of a commercial strip along Richmond Avenue; this strip, which extends to the vicinity of the Staten Island Mall approximately 4 miles (6 km) away, is the scene of some of the heaviest automotive traffic on Staten Island.

== Demographics ==
For census purposes, the New York City Department of City Planning classifies Graniteville as part of a larger Neighborhood Tabulation Area called Mariner's Harbor-Arlington-Graniteville SI0107. This designated neighborhood had 33,492 inhabitants based on data from the 2020 United States Census. This was an increase of 2,018 persons (6.4%) from the 31,474 counted in 2010. The neighborhood had a population density of 35.2 inhabitants per acre (14,500/sq mi; 5,600/km^{2}).

The racial makeup of the neighborhood was 19.8% (6,618) White (Non-Hispanic), 29.4% (9,853) Black (Non-Hispanic), 10.9% (3,659) Asian, and 4.4% (1,452) from two or more races. Hispanic or Latino of any race were 35.6% (11,910) of the population.

According to the 2020 United States Census, this area has many cultural communities of over 1,000 inhabitants. This include residents who identify as Mexican, Puerto Rican, Dominican, Irish, Italian, Chinese, and African-American.

The largest age group was people 5-19 years old, which made up 22.2% of the residents. 74.5% of the households had at least one family present. Out of the 10,640 households, 40.9% had a married couple (18.1% with a child under 18), 5.7% had a cohabiting couple (2.9% with a child under 18), 17.9% had a single male (2.1% with a child under 18), and 35.5% had a single female (10.9% with a child under 18). 41.4% of households had children under 18. In this neighborhood, 70.2% of non-vacant housing units are renter-occupied.

== Education ==
Public school students in Graniteville are mostly zoned for P.S.861 (The School of Civic Leadership), P.S.60 and P.S.22, and I.S.51 (Markham Intermediate School) or I.S.72 (Rocco Laurie Intermediate School), as well as Port Richmond High School. The John W. Lavelle Preparatory Charter School opened in September 2009 and is the first charter school (a school that is publicly funded, but privately run) on Staten Island. Also, a new school called The Staten Island School of Civic Leadership (P.S./I.S. 861) opened in September. This is Staten Island's first K to 8 school. Residents don't have a library in the community and use the Port Richmond, Todt Hill-Westerleigh, and Mariners Harbor branches of the New York Public Library.

== Transportation ==
Graniteville is served by the S48, S98, SIM30, SIM33, SIM34 and SIM35 on Forest Avenue, the S40, S46, S48, S90, S96, S98, SIM33 and SIM34 on South Avenue, and the S44, S59, S89, S94, SIM3, SIM4, SIM8, and SIM8X on Richmond Avenue.

== Police and crime ==
Graniteville and the West Shore are patrolled by the 121st Precinct of the NYPD, located at 970 Richmond Avenue. The 121st Precinct was split from the 120th Precinct in 2013; the latter ranked 12th safest out of 69 patrol areas for per-capita crime in 2010. The 121st Precinct saw one murder, 13 rapes, 86 robberies, 216 felony assaults, 90 burglaries, 397 grand larcenies, and 115 grand larcenies auto in 2022.

== Parks ==
The neighborhood is next to the Graniteville Swamp.

== Notable persons ==
- Eddie "Cousin Eddie" Garafola (1938– 2020), American Gambino crime family captain
