= S96 =

S96 may refer to:

- S96 (New York City bus) serving Staten Island
- S96, a non-geographic postcode in Sheffield, England
