= S89 =

S89 may refer to:

- S89 (New York City bus) serving Staten Island
- County Route S89 (Bergen County, New Jersey)
- Daihatsu Hijet (S89), a kei truck and microvan
