= Richmond Avenue =

Avenue in Staten Island, New York

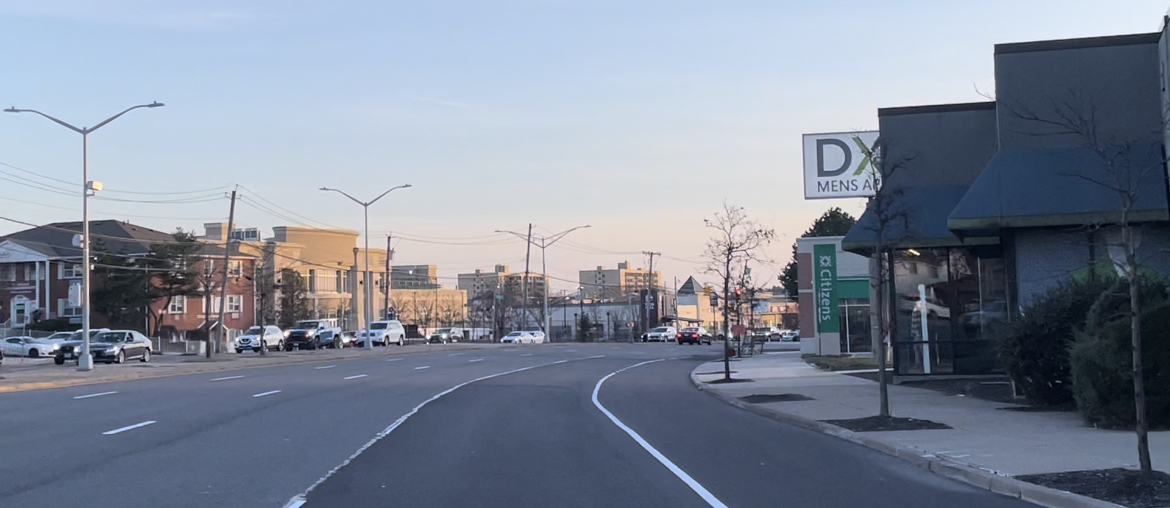
- Richmond Avenue in New Springville
- Owner: City of New York
- Maintained by: NYCDOT
- Length: 7.05 mi (11.35 km)
- Location: Staten Island, New York
- Coordinates: 40°34′50.4″N 74°10′9.64″W
- South end: Tennyson Drive in Eltingville
- North end: Forest Avenue in Graniteville

Richmond Avenue is a major north-south thoroughfare on Staten Island, New York. Measuring approximately 7.0 miles (11.3 km), the road runs from the South Shore community of Eltingville to the North Shore community of Graniteville.

== Street description ==
Richmond Avenue begins at Tennyson Drive and Crescent Beach Park bordering Raritan Bay. Hylan Boulevard is the first major intersection, 0.2 miles (0.32 km) to the north. After intersecting Amboy Road and then crossing under the Staten Island Railway, Richmond Avenue continues north to Arthur Kill Road. A tenth of a mile later, the avenue intersects with the end of Korean War Veterans Parkway (formerly Richmond Parkway). Richmond Avenue then crosses over Richmond Creek on the Fresh Kills Bridge, gains a median divider, and passes between the Staten Island Mall and Freshkills Park. Richmond Avenue intersects Rockland Avenue and Draper Place in New Springville before traveling along the edge of Willowbrook Park.

Richmond Avenue continues north to the intersection with Victory Boulevard. Richmond Avenue intersects Lamberts Lane, a road with access to the Brooklyn-bound Staten Island Expressway (I-278). Goethals Road North, a road that parallels the expressway, then begins to the left. It intersects Forest Avenue 0.8 miles (1.3 km) north, where the median divider of Richmond Avenue ends. This is the northern terminus of Richmond Avenue as a major two-way street. North of Forest Avenue, most traffic continues north to Richmond Terrace via Morningstar Road, while Richmond Avenue diverges to the east as a narrow one-way residential street. Richmond Avenue ends at Willow Road West, a service road for NY Route 440, two blocks east of Morningstar Road.

== History ==
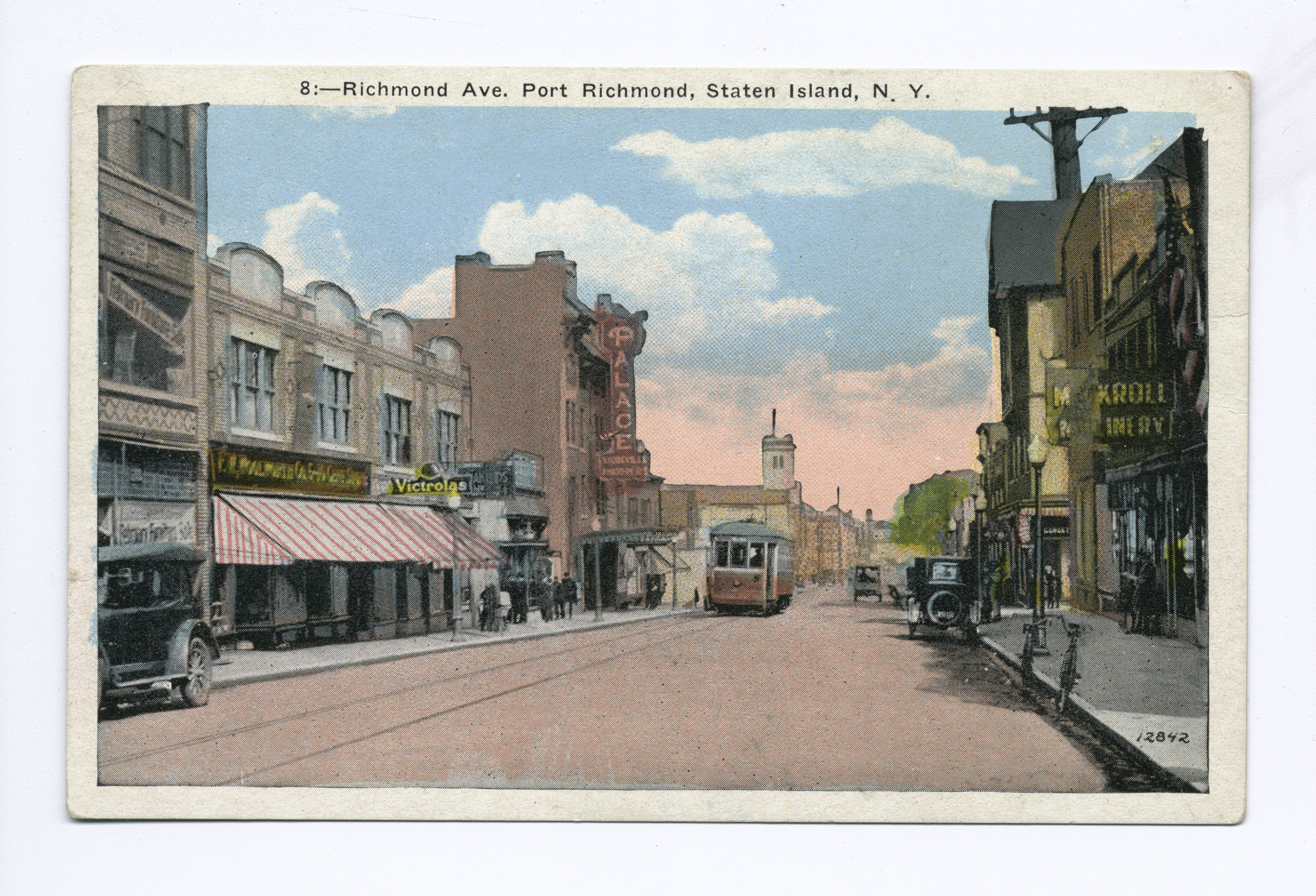
Port Richmond, early 20th century

The road is one of the older ones on Staten Island, presumably dating back to the early-to-mid-19th century. Early writings and periodicals refer to Richmond Avenue as the road from Port Richmond to New Springville, just north of the Fresh Kills. Sections of road along what is currently Richmond Avenue were known by various names, such as Old Stone Road and Church Road (in Port Richmond), Bridge Avenue (south to Arthur Kill Road), Eltingville Road (continuing south to Amboy Road), and Seaside Avenue (the final section). In 1912, they were all consolidated as "Richmond Avenue". In 1964, the construction of the Willowbrook Expressway divided Richmond Avenue into two sections, the northern segment being later renamed Port Richmond Avenue.

In the 1920s and 1930s, most of Richmond Avenue, particularly south of Victory Boulevard, was predominantly farmland. The road itself was merely one-lane wide. However, indicative of the economic transformation the Richmond Avenue corridor of Staten Island experienced, specifically with the opening of the Staten Island Mall in 1972, the roadway was widened. The roadway from Rockland Avenue to Forest Hill Road has been widened to an eight-lane thoroughfare (four lanes each way), while other sections are two and three lanes wide.

Prior to the construction of any expressway on Staten Island, Richmond Avenue, north of Drumgoole Boulevard, was designated New York Route 440, which it held until the West Shore Expressway was completed in 1976.

== Public transportation ==
Richmond Avenue is served by the following bus routes:

- The primary buses are the S59 and S89, serving the entire corridor except for two portions: between Platinum Avenue and either Staten Island Mall’s north entrance/exit (S59), or Richmond Hill Road (S89), and between Yukon Avenue and Forest Hill Road (S59 only).
  - At Hylan Boulevard, most buses terminate, while weekday daytime S59 service continues west towards Tottenville. At Forest Avenue, the S59 heads east towards the Port Richmond Terminal, while the S89 continues on Morningstar Road towards Bayonne, New Jersey.
- The portion between Forest Avenue and Yukon Avenue (SI Mall) or Independence Avenue (St. George Ferry) is served by the S44 and S94 route.
- The portion south of Platinum Avenue is also served by the S79 SBS bus.
- Additional weekday service between Platinum Avenue and Drumgoole Road West is provided by the S55, S56 and SIM8, as well as the SIM4 every day.
  - The two express routes also run between Richmond Hill Road and either Lamberts Lane (Manhattan-bound SIM4/Huguenot-bound SIM8), Goethals Road North (Manhattan-bound SIM8), or Staten Island Expressway’s westbound Richmond Avenue exit (Annadale-bound SIM4).
- From Hylan Boulevard, the SIM1, SIM7, SIM10 run to the Eltingville Transit Center and terminate, while the SIM22 continues to Arthur Kill Road and heads west toward Manhattan via Goethals Bridge.
  - At Hylan, the former heads east for Manhattan via the Verrazano-Narrows Bridge, and the latter heads west to terminate at Woods of Arden Road.
- North of the Eltingville Transit Center, the SIM31 provides express service to Platinum Avenue.
- The SIM33 runs between Victory Boulevard and Forest Avenue, and is joined with the SIM3 and SIM34 north of Deppe Place. Only the SIM3 heads east on Forest.

== Major intersections ==
The entire route is in the New York City borough of Staten Island.

Location	mi	km	Destinations	Notes
Eltingville	0.00	0.00	Tennyson Drive	Raritan Bay shore
Eltingville	0.14	0.23	Hylan Boulevard	
Annadale–Eltingville line	0.97	1.56	Amboy Road	No northbound left turn
Arden Heights–Eltingville line	2.26	3.64	Arthur Kill Road to Korean War Veterans Parkway south – Outerbridge Crossing	
Brookfield Park	2.41	3.88	To Korean War Veterans Parkway south – Outerbridge Crossing	No northbound exit; access via Drumgoole Road West
Bulls Head	5.57	8.96	Victory Boulevard – Goethals Bridge	
Bulls Head–Graniteville line	6.17	9.93	I-278 / NY 440 (Staten Island Expressway)	Exit 7 on I-278 / NY 440
Graniteville–Mariners Harbor line	7.05	11.35	Forest Avenue / Morningstar Road – Bayonne Bridge	
1.000 mi = 1.609 km; 1.000 km = 0.621 mi: Incomplete access
