= Eltingville Transit Center =

Bus terminal in Staten Island, New York

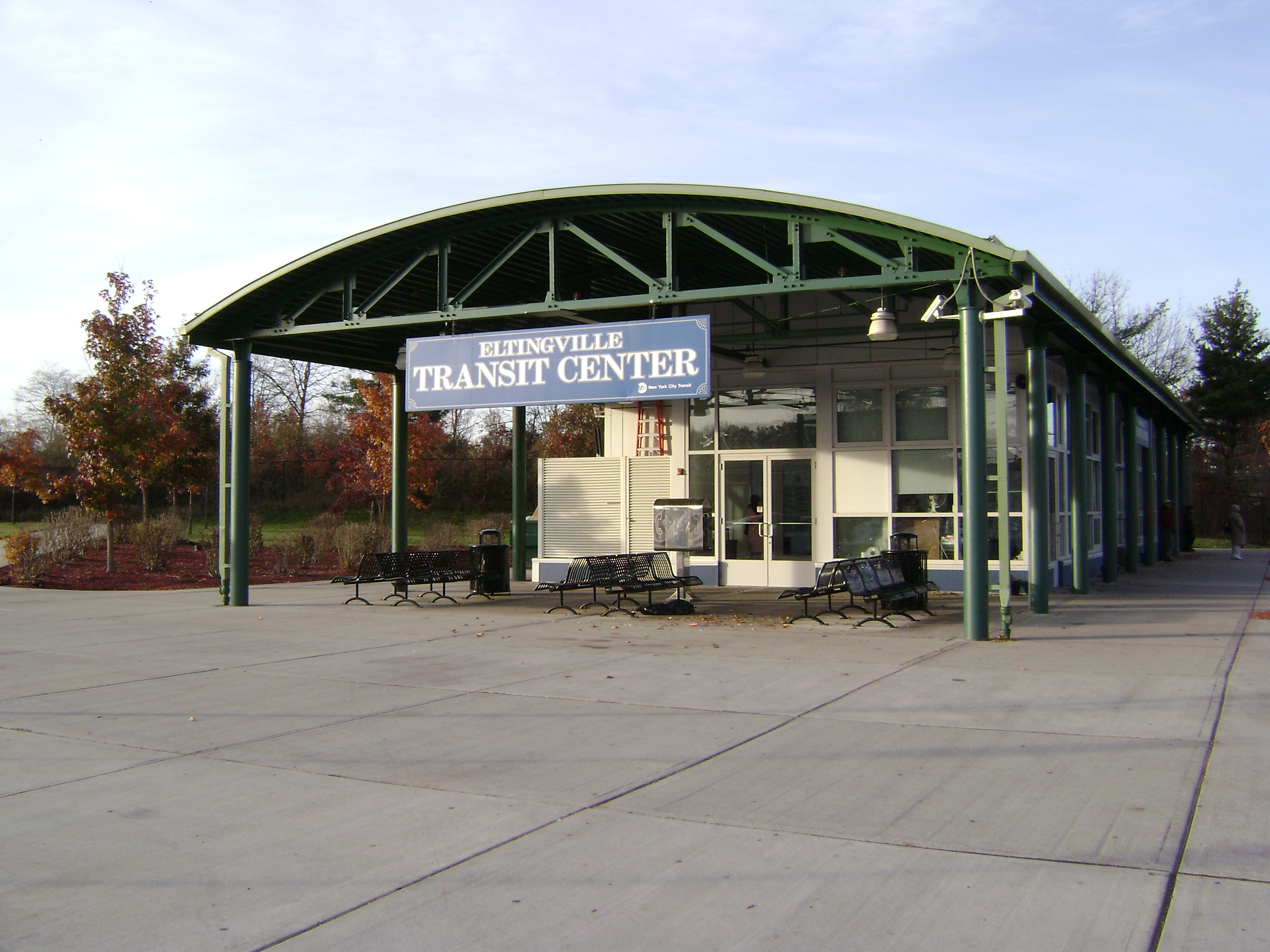
- The main entrance in 2007

General information
- Location: Richmond Avenue & Arthur Kill Road; Eltingville, Staten Island, New York
- Coordinates: 40.5606°N 74.1712°W
- System: New York City park and ride transit center
- Owner: Metropolitan Transportation Authority
- Operator: New York City Transit Authority
- Bus routes: 7 local routes, 12 express routes
- Bus stands: 9 bays

Construction
- Platform levels: 1
- Parking: 586 spaces (free)

History
- Opened: March 21, 2004
Location

Eltingville Transit Center is a park and ride transit center that is located in Eltingville, Staten Island. It is located at the intersection of Arthur Kill Road and Richmond Avenue, at the end of the Korean War Veterans Parkway. The transit center was completed in 2004. Amenities include schedules, maps, free parking, and vending machines for soda, snacks, and OMNY. The center is halfway between the Eltingville Staten Island Railway station and the Staten Island Mall, another (de jure) transit center, including the adjacent Yukon Depot.

== History ==
On December 12, 2022, the Metropolitan Transportation Authority announced that work would begin that week on a project to increase the number of spots at the center 34 percent from 437 to 586 spaces. The new spaces will be added to the west side of the existing parking lot. As part of the project, new lighting, a new curb, and new drainage systems will be installed. The project will cost $4.3 million and be completed in spring 2023.

== Services ==
The following bus routes stop at the Eltingville Transit Center:

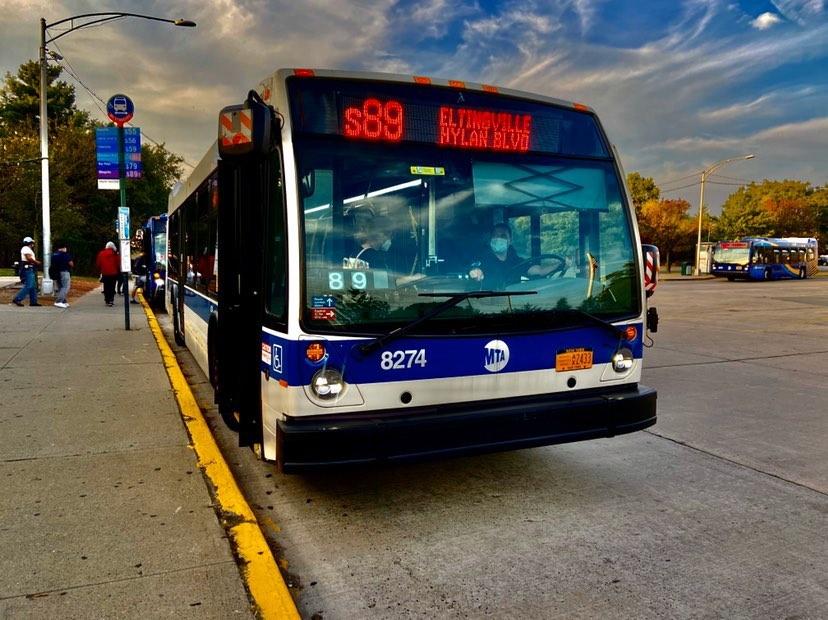
An S89 bus stopped at the Transit Center

=== Local ===
- S55: Staten Island Mall to Rossville via Annadale Road
- S56: Staten Island Mall to Tottenville High School via Arden Avenue
- S59: Port Richmond to Eltingville (with a peak extension to Tottenville)
- S74/S84 Limited: St. George Ferry Terminal to Bricktown Mall via Richmond and Arthur Kill Roads
- S79 SBS: Staten Island Mall to Bay Ridge via Hylan Boulevard
- S89 Limited: 34th Street HBLR station (Bayonne, NJ) to Eltingville via Richmond Avenue

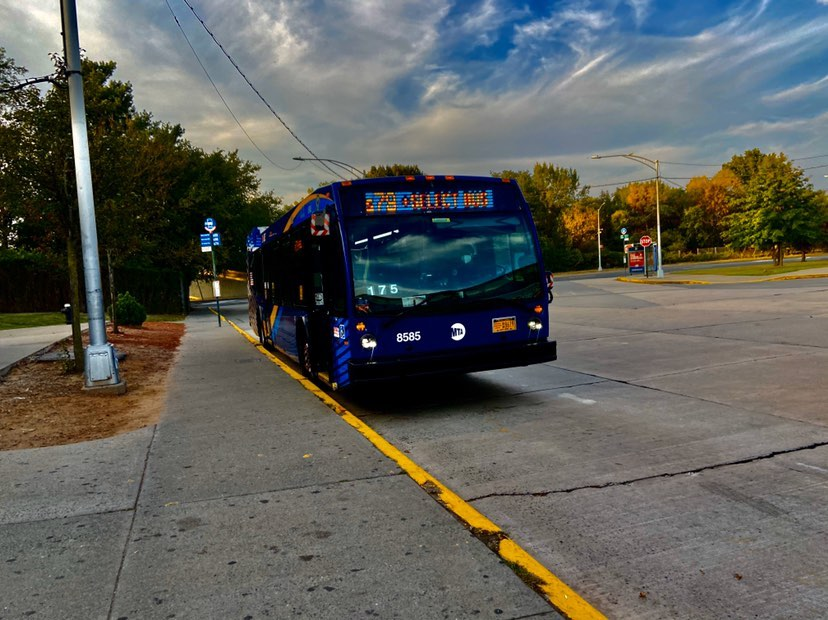
An S79-SBS bus stopped at the Transit Center

=== Express ===
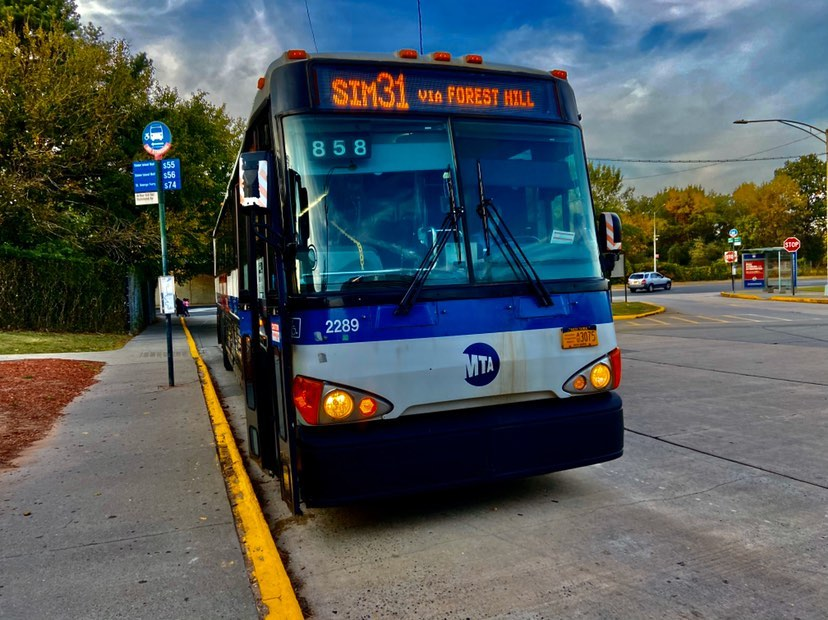
A SIM31 bus terminating at the Transit Center

- SIM1: Lower Manhattan via Church Street and Broadway
- SIM1C: Midtown Manhattan via Fifth Avenue and Sixth Avenue
- SIM4: Lower Manhattan via Church Street and Broadway
- SIM4C: Midtown Manhattan via Fifth Avenue and Madison Ave
- SIM5: Lower Manhattan via Water Street
- SIM6: Midtown Manhattan via Lexington Avenue and Madison Avenue
- SIM7: Union Square via Sixth Avenue, Broadway, and West Street
- SIM8: Midtown Manhattan via New Jersey and 42nd Street
- SIM10: Midtown Manhattan via Fifth Avenue and Sixth Avenue
- SIM15: Lower Manhattan Downtown Loop via Church Street and Water Street
- SIM22: Midtown Manhattan via New Jersey and 42nd Street
- SIM31: Midtown Manhattan via Fifth Avenue and Madison Avenue

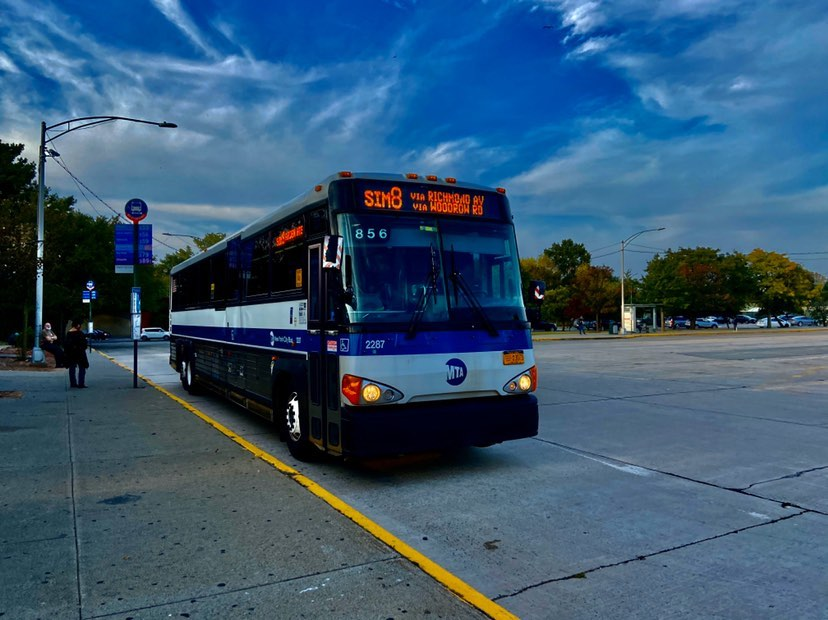
A SIM8 bus stopped at the Transit Center
