= S79 (New York City bus) =

Bus route in Brooklyn and Staten Island, New York

s79
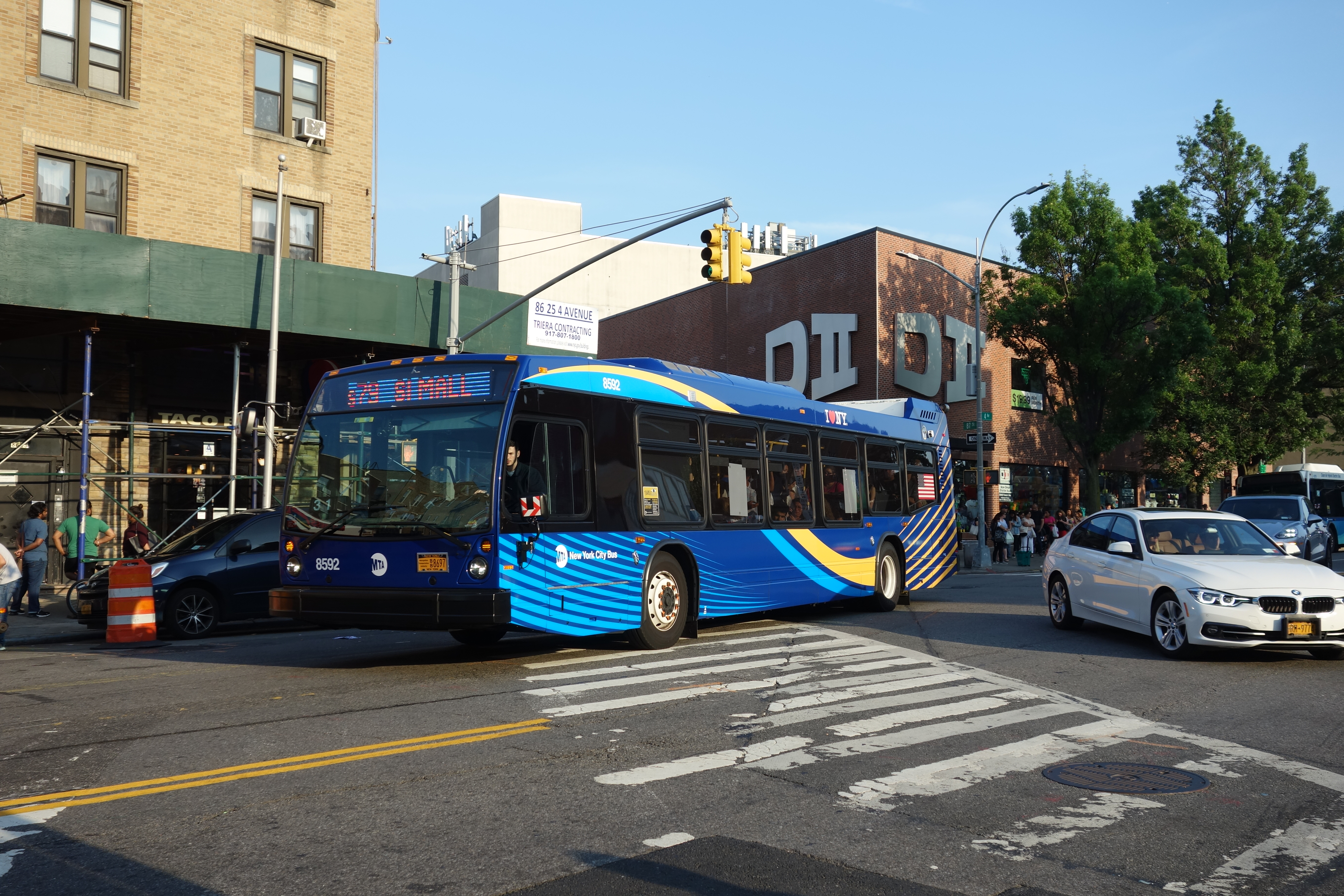
- A 2019 Nova Bus LFS (8592) on the Staten Island Mall-bound S79 SBS turning right onto 4th Avenue from 87th Street in July 2019

Overview
- System: MTA Regional Bus Operations
- Operator: New York City Transit Authority
- Garage: Yukon Depot
- Vehicle: Nova Bus LFS
- Began service: April 15, 1990 (S79); September 2, 2012 (Select Bus Service)

Route
- Route type: Select Bus Service, Limited-stop and with some bus rapid transit features
- Locale: Staten Island and Brooklyn, New York, U.S.
- Communities served: Bay Ridge, Fort Hamilton, Concord, Arrochar, Dongan Hills, Midland Beach, New Dorp, Oakwood, Bay Terrace, Great Kills, Eltingville, New Springville
- Start: Bay Ridge - 4th Avenue & 86th Street
- Via: Brooklyn: 92nd Street, 4th Avenue, 86th Street, Fort Hamilton Parkway; Staten Island: Narrows Road, Hylan Boulevard, Richmond Avenue
- End: New Springville – Staten Island Mall
- Length: 14.8 miles (23.8 km)
- Stops: 23
- Other routes: S59 Richmond Avenue Local/Hylan Boulevard South; S53 Clove Road Local; S93 Clove Road/ Victory Blvd LTD; S78 Hylan Boulevard Local

Service
- Frequency: 5-30 Minutes
- Operates: 4:10 AM - 1 AM
- Annual patronage: 2,640,435 (2025)
- Transfers: Yes
- Timetable: S79

The S79 Select Bus Service constitutes a bus route in Staten Island and Brooklyn, New York, running primarily on Richmond Avenue, Hylan Boulevard, and Narrows Road in Staten Island, and 92nd Street, Fourth Avenue, 86th Street, and Fort Hamilton Parkway in Brooklyn. It is based at the Yukon Depot.

The S78 and S79 were originally one route, but were split in 1990. In 2012, the S79 was converted to Select Bus Service, the first and now-only route in Staten Island to do so. It is the busiest bus route in Staten Island, serving 2.6 million riders in 2025.

== Route description and service ==
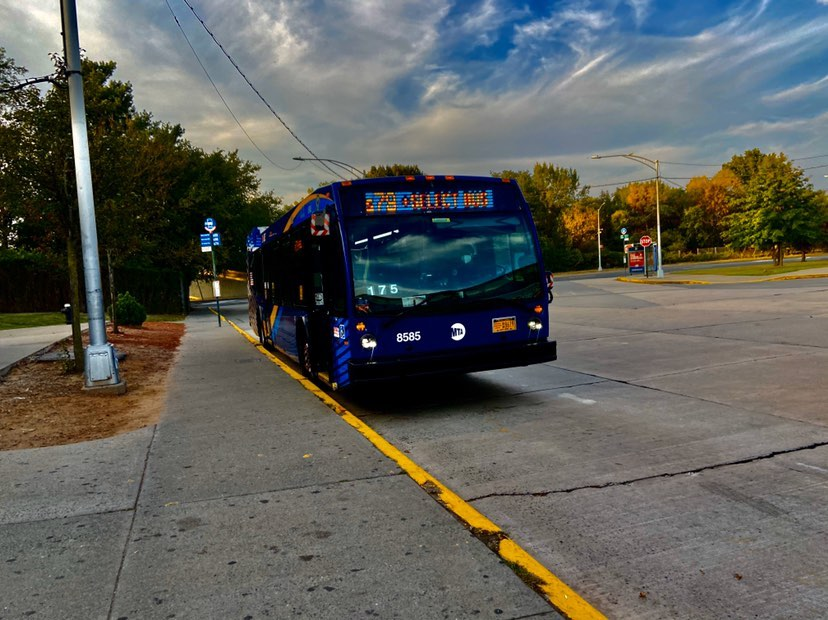
A 2019 Nova Bus LFS (8585) on the Bay Ridge-bound S79 SBS at the Eltingville Transit Center.

The S79 begins at Ring Road and Marsh Avenue, near Staten Island Mall, and uses Ring Road to access Platinum Avenue, and then Richmond Avenue, while buses heading to the mall use Ring Road and Marsh Avenue to access the terminus. It then continues along Richmond Avenue until it turns to Hylan Boulevard. It then goes along the boulevard for most of the length until it turns to Steuben Street and then Narrows Road, and then goes on the Verrazzano–Narrows Bridge, and uses exit 17 to access 92nd Street, and turns right onto 4th Avenue from 92nd Street, and then continues until it ends at 86th Street, near the 86th Street station on the BMT Fourth Avenue Line, which is served by the R train. Buses heading to Staten Island use 86th Street and Fort Hamilton Parkway to access the Verrazzano–Narrows Bridge.

This route uses rigid 40-foot Nova LFS diesel buses, and may use Prevost X3-45 buses on occasion; it originally ran Orion VII NG Hybrid buses, now using the EPA10s from Castleton Depot if needed and available. The S79 is the only SBS line that does not utilize off-board fare collection, and so it prevents all-door boarding; when SBS was implemented in 2012, the Metropolitan Transportation Authority (MTA) had determined that off-board fare collection was unnecessary since the route's boarding times were short enough. Additionally, it is one of two SBS routes that does not use 60-foot articulated buses, along with the B82 SBS, as well as the only SBS line to not have blue destination signs until July 2017. Riders must pay the fare on board, as they do on local, limited-stop, and express buses.

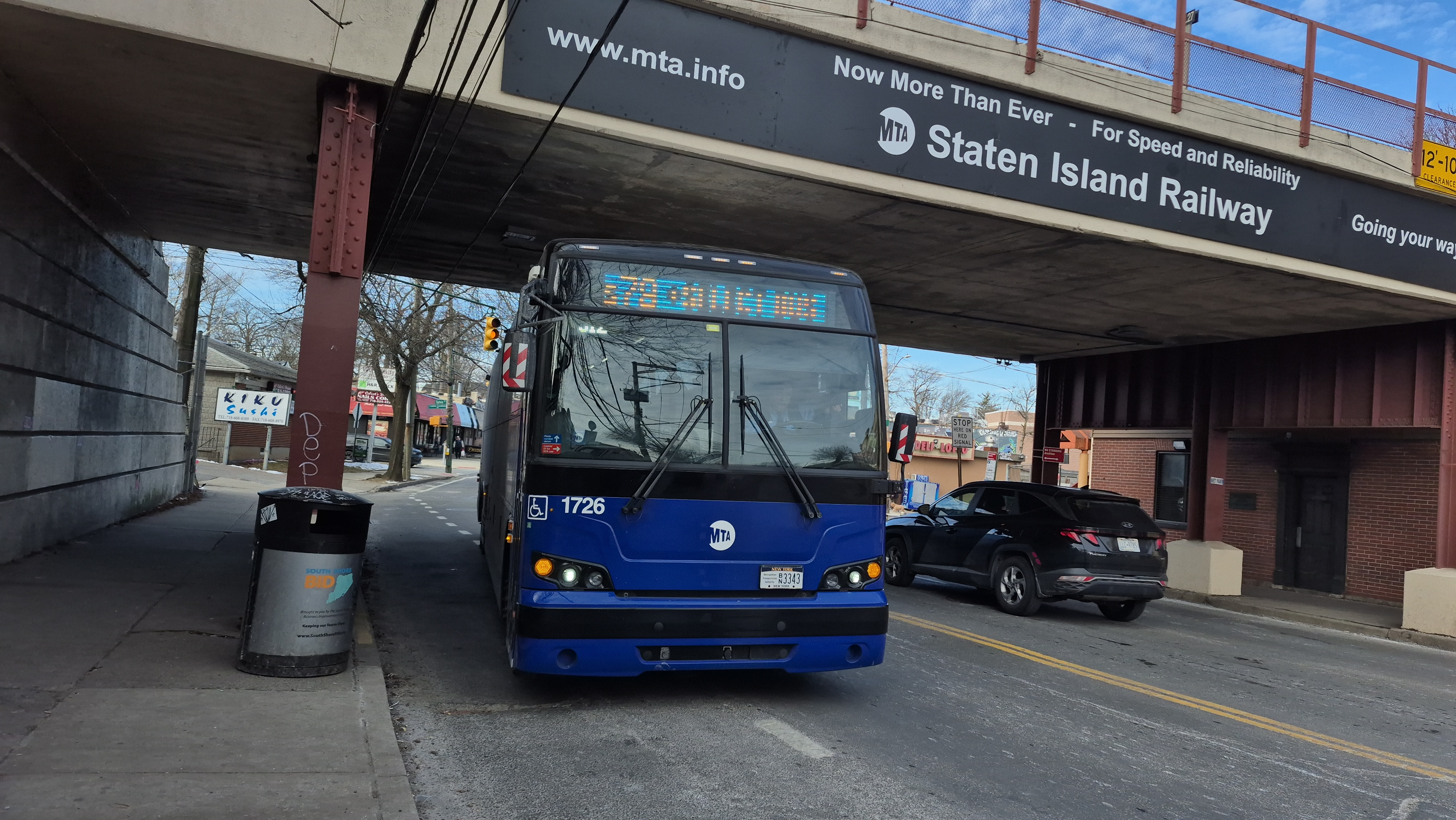
2025 Prevost X3-45 #1726 on the S79-SBS at Eltingville SIR station

=== Stops ===
Northbound is towards Brooklyn and southbound is towards Staten Island. The S79 SBS is 14.8 miles (23.8 km) long.

Station Street traveled	Direction	Connections
Staten Island Mall Marsh Avenue Park and Ride	Southbound terminus, northbound station	NYC Bus: S55, S56, S61, S89, S91, SIM4, SIM4C, SIM8, SIM31
Staten Island Mall Ring Road – Macy's	Bidirectional	NYC Bus: S44, S59, S94
Staten Island Mall Ring Road – Sears	Bidirectional	NYC Bus: S44, S59, S94
Yukon Avenue Richmond Avenue	Bidirectional	NYC Bus: S44, S55, S56, S59, S61, S89, S91, S94, SIM4, SIM4C, SIM8, SIM31
Eltingville Transit Center	Bidirectional	NYC Bus: S55, S56, S59, S74, S84, S89, SIM1, SIM1C, SIM4, SIM4C, SIM5, SIM6, SIM7, SIM8, SIM10, SIM15, SIM22, SIM31
Genesee Avenue	Bidirectional	NYC Bus: S59, SIM1, SIM1C, SIM7, SIM10, SIM22
Eltingville Boulevard	Bidirectional	NYC Bus: S59, S89, SIM1, SIM1C, SIM7, SIM10, SIM22; Staten Island Railway at Eltingville
Hylan Boulevard Richmond Avenue	Southbound	NYC Bus: S54, S59, S78, S89, SIM1, SIM1C, SIM7, SIM9, SIM10, SIM22
Winchester Avenue Hylan Boulevard	Northbound	NYC Bus: S54, S78, SIM1, SIM1C, SIM7, SIM9, SIM10, SIM22
Nelson Avenue	Bidirectional	NYC Bus: S54, S78, SIM1, SIM1C, SIM5, SIM6, SIM7, SIM9, SIM10
Bay Terrace	Bidirectional	NYC Bus: S78, SIM1, SIM1C, SIM5, SIM6, SIM7, SIM9, SIM10
Buffalo Street Great Kills Park	Bidirectional	NYC Bus: S78, SIM1, SIM1C, SIM5, SIM6, SIM7, SIM9, SIM10
Guyon Av	Bidirectional	NYC Bus: S57, S78, SIM1, SIM1C, SIM5, SIM6, SIM7, SIM9, SIM10
Tysens Lane	Bidirectional	NYC Bus: S57, S78, SIM1, SIM1C, SIM5, SIM6, SIM7, SIM9, SIM10, SIM11
Ebbitts Street	Bidirectional	NYC Bus: S78, SIM1, SIM1C, SIM5, SIM6, SIM7, SIM9, SIM10, SIM11
New Dorp Lane	Bidirectional	NYC Bus: S76, S78, S86, SIM1, SIM1C, SIM5, SIM6, SIM7, SIM9, SIM10, SIM11
Midland Avenue	Bidirectional	NYC Bus: S51, S78, S81, SIM1, SIM1C, SIM7, SIM10, SIM11
Seaview Avenue	Bidirectional	NYC Bus: S78, SIM1, SIM1C, SIM7, SIM10, SIM11
Old Town Road / Quintard Street	Bidirectional	NYC Bus: S78, SIM1, SIM1C, SIM7, SIM10, SIM11; Staten Island Railway at Old Town
Clove Road	Bidirectional	NYC Bus: S53, S78, SIM1, SIM1C, SIM7, SIM10, SIM11
Narrows Road	Bidirectional	NYC Bus: S78, S93, SIM1, SIM1C, SIM3C, SIM7, SIM10, SIM11, SIM15, SIM33C, SIM35
Fingerboard Road	Bidirectional	NYC Bus: S52, S93, SIM1, SIM1C, SIM3C, SIM7, SIM10, SIM11, SIM15, SIM33C, SIM35
Verrazzano–Narrows Bridge – Staten Island/Brooklyn border
92nd Street Fort Hamilton Parkway	Bidirectional	NYC Bus: B8, B70, S53, S93
Bay Ridge – 86th Street Fourth Avenue	Northbound terminus, southbound station	NYC Bus: B1, B16, S53, S93; NYC Subway: train at 86th Street

=== School trippers ===
When school is in session, two buses depart New Dorp High School at 2:30pm and run via New Dorp Lane to Hylan Boulevard. Four buses also depart Staten Island Technical High School at 2:52pm and run via Clawson Street and Beach Avenue to Hylan Boulevard. All trippers operate to Brooklyn.

== History ==
The S79 was originally the R103, which ran between St. George Ferry Terminal Ramp "E" and Tottenville. In 1975, it was renumbered the S103. In September 1980, every other S103 bus was rerouted along Richmond Avenue to terminate at the Staten Island Mall, providing service from Staten Island's South Shore. At the same time, every other S102 bus was rerouted to the Mall, providing North Shore service. On January 4, 1987, as part of reductions in bus service on seven routes across the city, S103 service was decreased. While fewer short-run trips to Hylan Boulevard in Eltingville would operate, more frequent service would be operated on the branch to the Staten Island Mall. On April 15, 1990, the S103 was split into two routes; the S78 assumed the Tottenville service, while the S79 assumed the Staten Island Mall service.

On June 26, 1992, the Metropolitan Transportation Authority (MTA) Board voted to approve a service change to reroute the northern terminal of the route from Saint George Ferry Terminal to 86th Street and Fourth Avenue in Bay Ridge, Brooklyn effective in September. The route would be revised to run via Steuben Street, Narrows Road North, and the Verrazzano–Narrows Bridge. Simultaneously, the B8 would be extended to 92nd Street to allow S79 riders to get to the Brooklyn Veterans Administration Hospital with a transfer. The proposed change was opposed by some store owners in Brooklyn and Brooklyn Borough President Howard Golden, who believed the route would lead Brooklyn shoppers to shop at the Staten Island Mall instead of at Bay Ridge stores. The change took effect on September 13, 1992 as part of the New York City Transit Authority's Fare Deal improvements program.

In April 2001, the MTA announced it would increase the span of S79 service on Sundays from 8:38 p.m. to 11 p.m. from Bay Ridge, and from 7:23 p.m. to 9:50 p.m. from Staten Island Mall due to demand for increased service. The additional service was expected to cost $40,000 a year, and would take effect in July 2001. In July 2001, it was announced that the span of morning service would be extended by two hours on weekends, to take effect in September 2001. The change was expected to cost $50,000 a year. S79 eastbound service previously began at 6:45 a.m. on Saturdays and 7:20 a.m. on Sundays, while westbound service began at 7:50 a.m. on Saturdays and at 8:30 a.m. on Sundays. With the change, eastbound service would begin at 4:45 a.m. on Saturdays and 5:20 a.m. on Sundays, and westbound service would begin at 6:00 a.m. on Saturdays and 6:30 a.m. on Sundays. The change would be made since ridership on the first trips of the day indicated demand for earlier service. The span of Sunday service was extended again on September 7, 2003, with the last trip from Staten Island leaving at 10:10 p.m. instead of 9:45 p.m., and the last trip from Brooklyn leaving at 11:30 p.m. instead of 11 p.m..

The MTA announced in June 2012 that the S79 would be converted to a Select Bus Service route, as the S79 was Staten Island's busiest bus route. On September 2, 2012, the S79 was converted to an SBS route, and three-quarter of the stops were eliminated. It was the first bus route in Staten Island to do so. While the routing was left mostly intact, the S79 had all local service eliminated and replaced by local service on the S59 route along Richmond Avenue and the S78 route along Hylan Boulevard. The route was also straightened through New Springville to bypass the Yukon Bus Depot, which was expected to save four minutes. By 2017, the route was so crowded that numerous local elected officials were advocating for the MTA to increase the frequency of S79 bus service.

The S79 was the last Select Bus Service route to use the former practice of flashing blue lights to tell the buses apart. Due to opposition from New York State Senator Andrew Lanza and Staten Island Councilman Vincent Ignizio citing that the lights were being mistaken for emergency vehicles and were thus against the law, the MTA barred the practice on all existing SBS routes and began installing multicolored destination signs to flash blue instead. The S79 was the last existing route to be upgraded in July 2017.

Traffic cameras were mounted onto S79 buses in late 2022 as part of a pilot program to ticket drivers who were using bus lanes illegally. In January 2023, the MTA announced that bike racks would be installed on the front of S79 buses.
