= LaTourette House =

Historic house in Staten Island, New York

- U.S. National Register of Historic Places
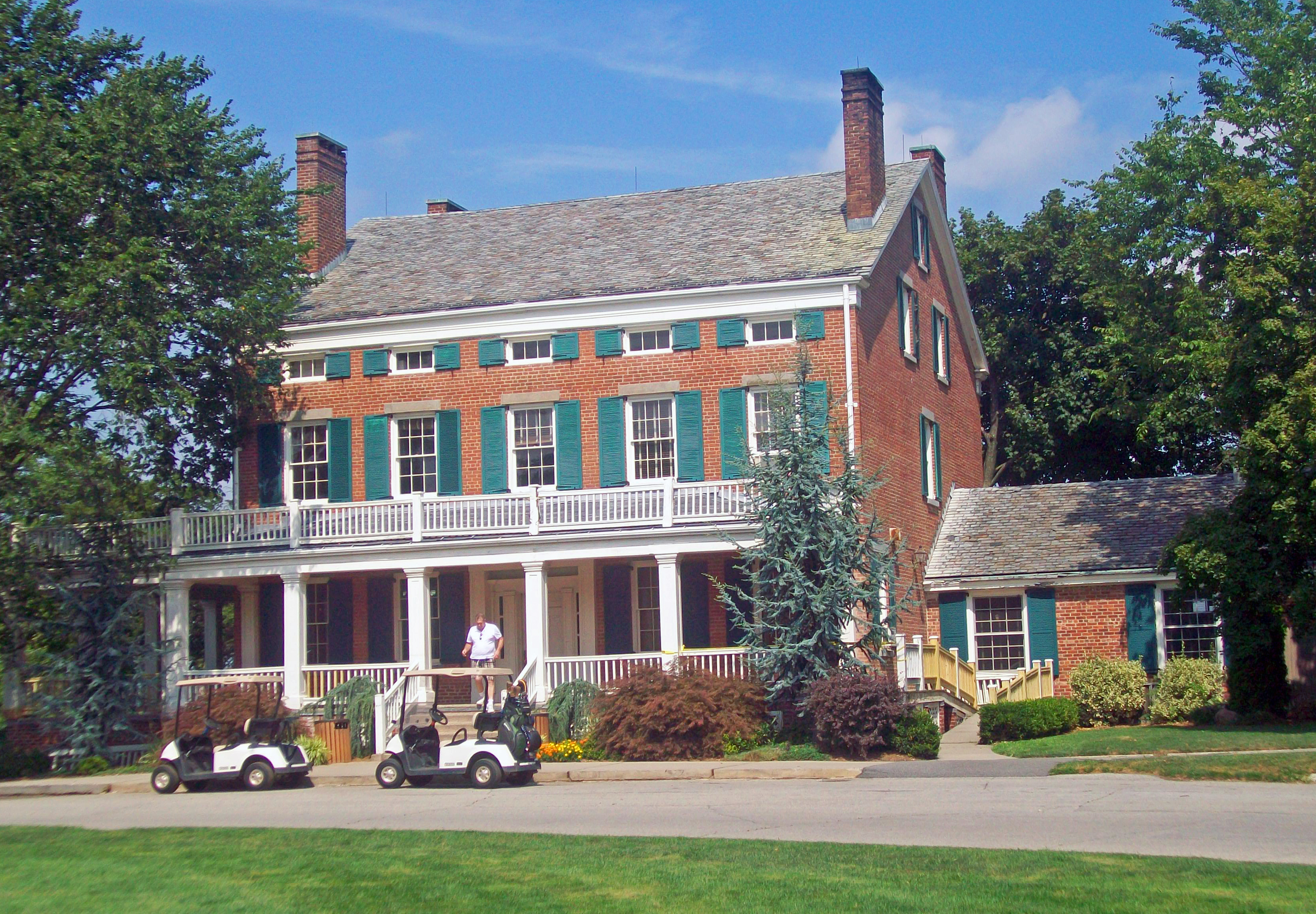
- LaTourette House, August 2009

- Location within New York City Location within New York Location within the United States
- Location: Richmond Hill, Staten Island, New York
- Coordinates: 40°34′34″N 74°8′50″W
- Area: 5 acres (2.0 ha)
- Built: 1836
- Architectural style: Greek Revival, Federal
- NRHP reference No.: 82003400
- Added to NRHP: March 5, 1982

LaTourette House is a historic home located at New Springville, Staten Island, New York. It was built in 1836 in a late Federal / early Greek Revival style. It is a large, sturdy gable roofed brick farmhouse with stone trim. In 1928 the house and 500 acres were purchased by New York City for a golf course and the house was converted to a clubhouse. The large, white L-shaped wood porch and one story extension were added in 1936 as part of a Work Projects Administration restoration project.

It was added to the National Register of Historic Places in 1982.
