= Bloomfield, Staten Island =

Neighborhood in New York City

Coordinates: 40°36′45″N 74°10′43″W

Bloomfield is a neighborhood on the West Shore of the New York City borough of Staten Island. It lies immediately to the north of Travis-Chelsea and to the west of Bulls Head. Prall's Island is situated in the Arthur Kill off its coast.

Originally named Daniell's Neck when first settled in the 17th century, it was later called Merrell Town after a local farmer. Its present name first appeared on a local map in 1874.

== History ==
=== 17th to 19th centuries ===
The Cool family were early settlers; Lambert's Lane in Bloomfield was named after Lambert Cool. The Merrell family was another that lived in late 18th century Bloomfield.

=== 20th century ===
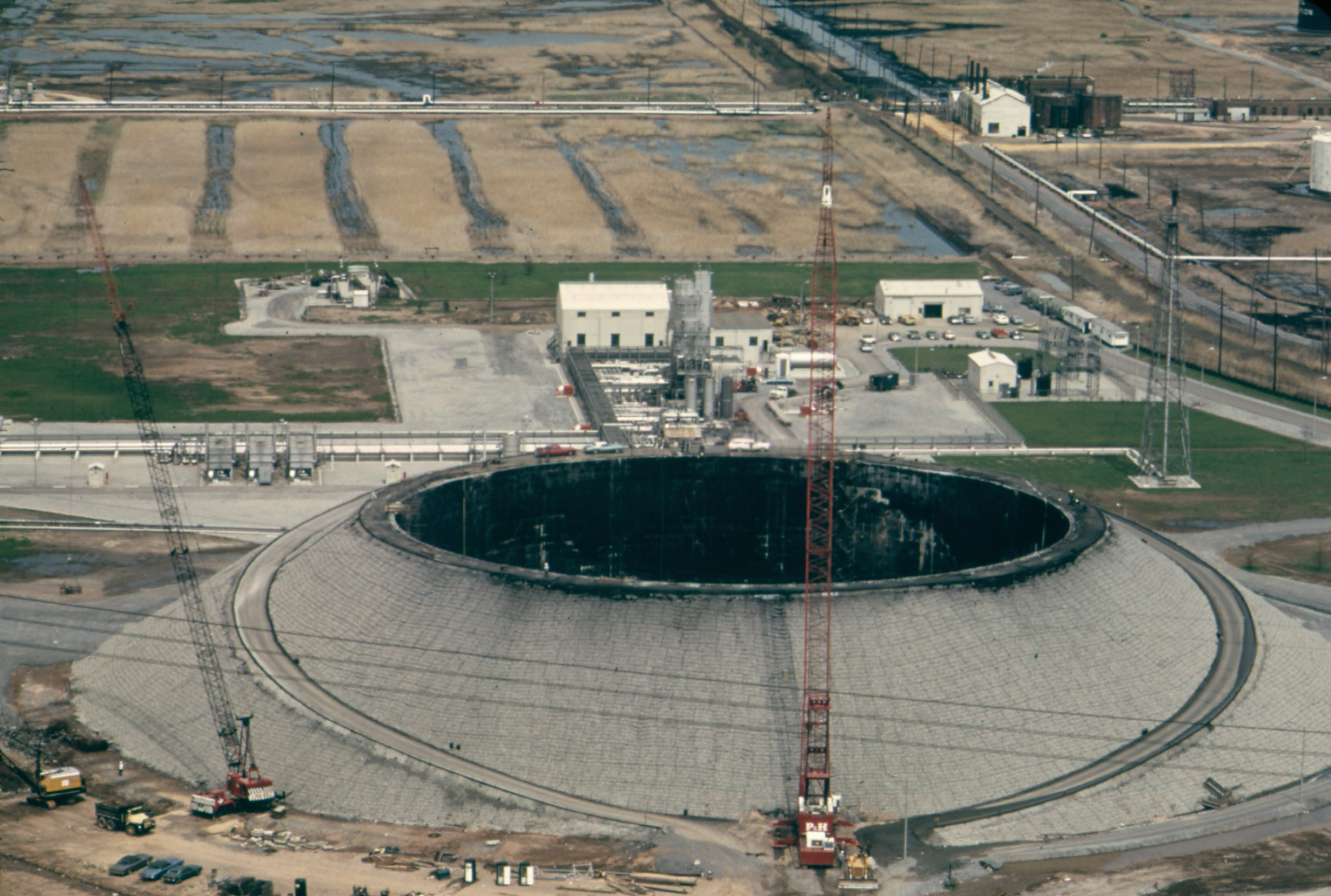
The gas tank that exploded in 1973

Throughout the 20th century, very few people actually resided in Bloomfield, much of its land being used by construction companies to store heavy equipment, such as cement mixers. A large oil storage terminal maintained by Gulf Oil could also once be found there, leading to one of the service roads of the West Shore Expressway receiving the name of Gulf Avenue; the 440 acres (178 ha) terminal (built in 1936), which housed 82 tanks having a total capacity of 215 million US gallons (814,000 cubic metres (28,700,000 ft^{3})), was closed in 1998, and the tanks have since been demolished. Commercial, but not residential, development accelerated rapidly in the late 1980s, when several large office buildings were constructed.

==== Gas explosion ====
On February 10, 1973, during a cleaning operation, 42 workers were inside one of the TETCo natural gas tanks, which had supposedly been completely drained ten months earlier. However, ignition occurred, causing a plume of combusting gas to rise within the tank. Two workers near the top felt the heat and rushed to the safety of scaffolding outside, while the other 40 workers died as the concrete cap on the tank rose 20–30 feet in the air and then came crashing back down, crushing them to death.

=== 21st century ===
In the early 2000s, other businesses, including two hotels, Hilton Garden Inn in 2001 and Hampton Inn & Suites opened in 2007 on South Avenue, the main thoroughfare. Bloomfield's vast expanses of open space have made it the focus of many ambitious proposals in the 2000s, including a failed proposal to build a NASCAR racetrack at the site of the former Gulf Oil facility. In Fall of 2018 the Matrix Global Logistics Park opened in Bloomfield, a distribution center for companies such as Amazon and Ikea, bringing more than 2,000 jobs and development to the area. But the area has yet to witness the kind of new-home construction that has been encountered virtually everywhere else on Staten Island since the Verrazzano–Narrows Bridge opened in 1964.

== Demographics ==
For census purposes, the New York City Department of City Planning classifies Bloomfield as part of a larger Neighborhood Tabulation Area called New Springville-Willowbrook-Bulls Head-Travis SI0204. This designated neighborhood had 42,871 inhabitants based on data from the 2020 United States Census. This was an increase of 3,561 persons (9.1%) from the 39,310 counted in 2010. The neighborhood had a population density of 8.5 inhabitants per acre (14,500/sq mi; 5,600/km^{2}).

The racial makeup of the neighborhood was 59.5% (25,502) White (Non-Hispanic), 3.0% (1,295) Black (Non-Hispanic), 19.6% (8,401) Asian, and 2.6% (1,136) from two or more races. Hispanic or Latino of any race were 15.2% (6,537) of the population.

According to the 2020 United States Census, this area has many cultural communities of over 1,000 inhabitants. This include residents who identify as Mexican, Puerto Rican, Albanian, German, Irish, Italian, Polish, Russian, Egyptian, Korean, and Chinese.

71.0% of the households had at least one family present. Out of the 10,773 households, 51.0% had a married couple (20.7% with a child under 18), 4.4% had a cohabiting couple (1.4% with a child under 18), 16.8% had a single male (1.5% with a child under 18), and 27.9% had a single female (3.9% with a child under 18). 31.8% of households had children. In this neighborhood, 33.4% of non-vacant housing units are renter-occupied.

== Transportation ==
Bloomfield is served by the S46 and S96 local-limited bus pair along South Avenue, and the S40 and S90 local-limited bus pair to the Matrix Global Logistics Park on Gulf Avenue. A proposal for the West Shore Light Rail has it running down the Travis Branch of the North Shore Railroad, stopping at a station in Bloomfield.
