= Chelsea, Staten Island =

Neighborhood in New York City

Coordinates: 40°36′06″N 74°11′34″W

Chelsea is a small neighborhood located on the West Shore of Staten Island in New York City. It is bordered on the north by South Avenue, on the east by the William T. Davis Wildlife Refuge, on the south by Meredith Avenue, and on the west by the Arthur Kill.

The area was originally named Pralltown after a family that was granted land there in 1675. During the Revolutionary period it was called Peanutville due to the storage there of quantities of peanuts for the passengers using the ferries to travel between New York and New Brunswick. In the 1950s, there were plans for Consolidated Edison to build a massive electric plant on 100 acres (40 ha) of land that it owned in Chelsea.

Chelsea is mostly open marsh and is relatively undeveloped, although there are some businesses and one-family houses. It borders on the Teleport and is the site of Staten Island's West Shore Plaza and the Metropolitan Transportation Authority's Meredith Avenue Bus Depot. Chelsea is served by the S46, S96, S62 and S92 local buses and the SIM32 express bus.

== Demographics ==
For census purposes, the New York City Department of City Planning classifies Chelsea as part of a larger Neighborhood Tabulation Area called New Springville-Willowbrook-Bulls Head-Travis SI0204. This designated neighborhood had 42,871 inhabitants based on data from the 2020 United States Census. This was an increase of 3,561 persons (9.1%) from the 39,310 counted in 2010. The neighborhood had a population density of 8.5 inhabitants per acre (14,500/sq mi; 5,600/km^{2}).

The racial makeup of the neighborhood was 59.5% (25,502) White (Non-Hispanic), 3.0% (1,295) Black (Non-Hispanic), 19.6% (8,401) Asian, and 2.6% (1,136) from two or more races. Hispanic or Latino of any race were 15.2% (6,537) of the population.

According to the 2020 United States Census, this area has many cultural communities of over 1,000 inhabitants. This include residents who identify as Mexican, Puerto Rican, Albanian, German, Irish, Italian, Polish, Russian, Egyptian, Korean, and Chinese.

71.0% of the households had at least one family present. Out of the 10,773 households, 51.0% had a married couple (20.7% with a child under 18), 4.4% had a cohabiting couple (1.4% with a child under 18), 16.8% had a single male (1.5% with a child under 18), and 27.9% had a single female (3.9% with a child under 18). 31.8% of households had children. In this neighborhood, 33.4% of non-vacant housing units are renter-occupied.
