= S59 and S89 buses =

Bus routes in New York and New Jersey

s59 s89
- Richmond Avenue
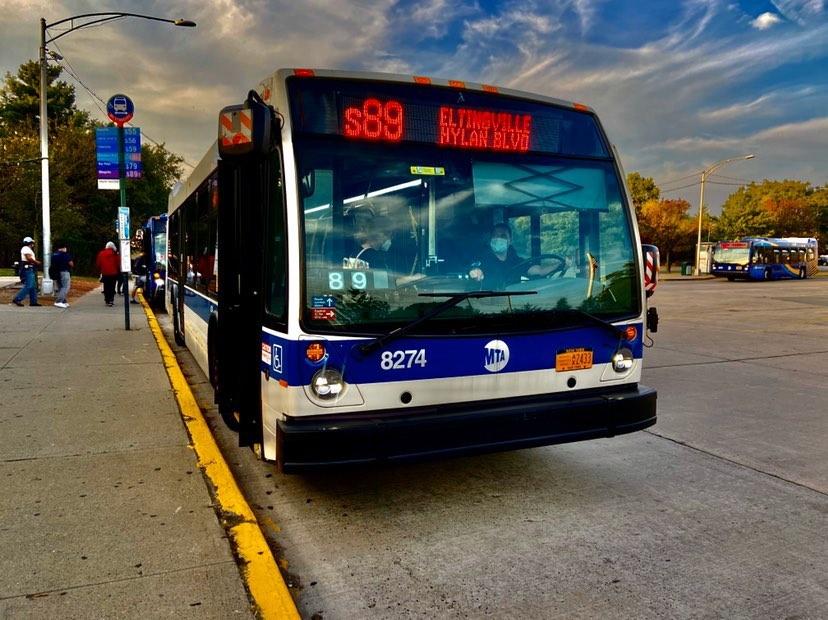
- A 2015 Nova Bus LFS (8274) on the S89 Limited, stopped at the Eltingville Transit Center

Overview
- System: MTA Regional Bus Operations
- Operator: New York City Transit Authority
- Garage: Yukon Depot
- Vehicle: Nova Bus LFS
- Began service: 1989-1990 (S59); September 4, 2007 (S89)
- Predecessors: R4

Route
- Locale: Staten Island, New York, U.S. Hudson County, New Jersey, U.S.
- Communities served: Bayonne, Port Richmond, Mariners Harbor, Graniteville, Bulls Head, Heartland Village, New Springville, Arden Heights, Eltingville, Annadale, Prince's Bay, Tottenville
- Start: Bayonne - 34th Street station (S89); Port Richmond - Richmond Terrace & Port Richmond Avenue (S59)
- Via: Bayonne Bridge (S89), Port Richmond Avenue (S59), Richmond Avenue, Hylan Boulevard (S59)
- End: Eltingville - Hylan Boulevard & Richmond Avenue (S59 off-peak, S89); Tottenville - Main Street & Amboy Road (S59 rush hours)
- Length: 9.2 miles (14.8 km) (S59 off-peak); 15.5 miles (24.9 km) (S59 rush hours); 12.3 miles (19.8 km) (S89)
- Other routes: S44/S94 Cary/Richmond Avenues; S79 Hylan Boulevard/Richmond Avenue South SBS

Service
- Operates: All times except late nights (S59); Rush hours only (S89)
- Annual patronage: 550,089 (S59, 2025); 79,631 (S89, 2025)
- Transfers: Yes
- Timetable: S59 S89

The S59 and S89 constitute a public transit line in the U.S. states of New York and New Jersey. The S59 runs wholly in New York City, between Port Richmond and either Eltingville or Tottenville in Staten Island, largely running on Richmond Avenue. The S89 makes limited stops along Richmond Avenue, running from Bayonne, New Jersey, to Eltingville, Staten Island, New York. They are both based out of the Yukon Depot.

== Route description ==
The S89 starts at 34th Street station on the Hudson-Bergen Light Rail (HBLR) in Bayonne. It then leaves the station to run on NJ-440 and across the Bayonne Bridge to Staten Island, exiting off the highway onto Morningstar Road. It continues south on Morningstar Road until Forest Avenue, where it becomes Richmond Avenue. The S59 starts at the Port Richmond Terminal, looping back onto Port Richmond Avenue via Park Avenue and Church Street. It continues south on Port Richmond Avenue, turning left onto Forest Avenue until reaching Richmond Avenue.

After both routes reach Forest Avenue-Richmond Avenue, they continue south along Richmond Avenue until reaching Richmond Hill Road, where they diverge again:

- The S59 continues south on Richmond Avenue, shifting onto Ring Road before continuing south and doing a dogleg turn back onto Richmond Avenue via Platinum Avenue and turning left onto Yukon Avenue, passing by the Yukon Depot before turning south onto Forest Hill Road and continuing through onto Richmond Avenue.
- The S89 turns onto Richmond Hill Road until reaching Marsh Avenue, running south until reaching Platinum Avenue, where it turns right and later turns left onto Richmond Avenue, where it continues south.

Both routes meet up again and run south on Richmond Avenue, deviating at Arthur Kill Road to serve Eltingville Transit Center. They eventually reach the road's southern terminus at Hylan Boulevard, where the S59 terminates outside of rush hours and where the S89 terminates, using an off-street bus loop south of Hylan Boulevard. During rush hours, the S59 follows the S78 westward, running along Hylan Boulevard until reaching Craig Avenue, running north and east along Craig Avenue and Amboy Road until reaching Main Street, where it terminates. Northbound S59 buses use Main Street to return to Hylan Boulevard.

The S89 is the only-non express MTA bus route to run in New Jersey, and the only MTA bus route, in general, to have any stops in the state. It only operates on weekdays during peak hours. Occasionally, an express bus may also operate the route, while still charging the local fare of $3.

=== School trippers ===
When school is in session, the S59 operates the following service patterns:

- Tottenville High School is served by two A.M. trips from Port Richmond, which depart at 6:20 and 7:57am, and by six P.M. trips to Port Richmond at 2:04 and 2:55pm, half of which terminate at the Staten Island Mall. These trips run via Luten Avenue, with A.M. trips stopping at the southeast corner on Eylandt Street.
- One P.M. trip to Port Richmond departs from I.S. 051 Edwin Markham on Willowbrook Road at 2:35pm, and heads to Forest Avenue via Houston Street and Willow Road.
- Two northbound trips originate at Wendy Drive where St. Joseph by the Sea High School is located, and depart at 2:37pm to terminate at Willow Road.
- One P.M. trip to Port Richmond originates at Richmond Preparatory Charter School, departing at 3:11pm.
- The A.M. trip to Space Shuttle Columbia School originates at Willowbrook Road at 7:55am, and diverts off Richmond Avenue to run via Richmond Hill Road and Marsh Avenue.
- One southbound P.M. trip departs Moore Catholic High School at 2:35pm, heading to Richmond Avenue via Merrill Avenue. This trip terminates at the Richmond Avenue roundabout on Hylan Boulevard.

== History ==
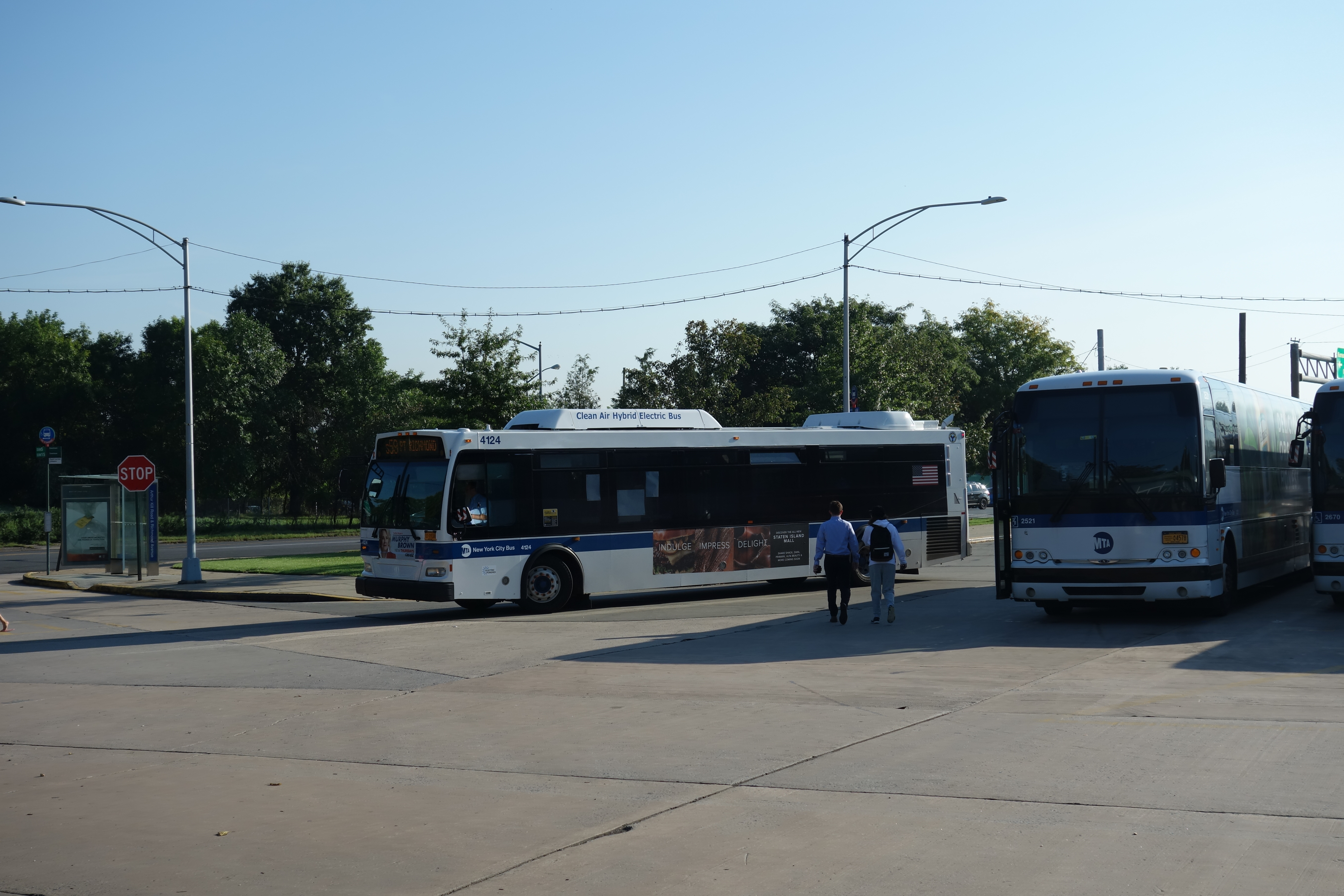
A 2009 Orion VII NG HEV (4124) on the Port Richmond-bound S59 departing Eltingville Transit Center in September 2018

The R4, the predecessor to both of these routes, originally ran between Port Richmond Terminal and Richmond Road-Rockland Avenue. In 1975, as Richmond County changed their official name to Staten Island, multiple bus routes in Staten Island, including the R4, had their prefix changed from R to S.

On September 13, 1987, a new branch of the S4 was created, running via Hylan Boulevard to Tottenville High School. The new branch provided direct access from Annadale, Huguenot, Prince's Bay, and Tottenville to the Staten Island Mall, and improved access to Richmond Memorial Hospital. Service on the branch would run from 5:55 a.m. to 11 p.m. weekdays, and would end earlier and start later on weekends. Weekday service on the S4 would run every 15 minutes, with service split evenly between this and the other branch of the S4 to Ebony Street and Rockland Road. Weekend service would run every 15 to 30 minutes, with service split between the branches.

Sometime between April 2, 1989, and April 15, 1990, the S4 was split, with the S59 taking over the Richmond Avenue portion and the S54 taking over the Nelson Avenue and Giffords Lane portion.

On September 10, 1995, as part of a systemwide series of cuts to bus service to reduce a budget deficit caused by the elimination of $113 million in city funding to New York City Transit, S59 service was discontinued between 1:20 a.m. and 4:40 a.m.. Service would operate weekdays to Tottenville between 5:30 a.m. and 8 p.m. and from Tottenville between 4:40 a.m. and 8 p.m. Service would run to Richmond Avenue and Hylan Boulevard between 8 p.m. and 1:20 a.m. and from there between 8 p.m. and 12:45 a.m.. Weekends, service would run to Tottenville between 5 a.m. and 8 p.m. and to Hylan Boulevard between 8 p.m. and 1:20 a.m. Service in the other direction to Port Richmond would operate from Tottenville between 4:40 a.m. and 8 p.m. and from Hylan Boulevard between 8 p.m. and 12:45 a.m.

=== Creation of the S89 ===
On October 2, 2006, Red and Tan Lines cut service on its remaining bus route to Staten Island, the 144, from nine trips in the morning rush hour to five since the route was not profitable. Since, prior to the cuts, at least two buses per day were standing room only, two extra buses were provided during the week on an as needed basis. On October 3, elected officials on Staten Island requested that the MTA take over the service. An MTA spokesperson said the MTA was looking into starting bus service between Jersey City and Staten Island. In spring 2006, the New York State Legislature had passed a bill to authorize New York City Transit to run interstate service to try to get the MTA to operate the service.

On June 18, 2007, MTA Executive Director Elliot G. Sander announced that the MTA would move forward with plans for a new bus route between Staten Island and the HBLR in Bayonne, New Jersey. Previously, he had said the MTA would not run the service until TransportAzumah, the existing operator, stopped running buses along the route. Sander said that he expected to create a service plan with NJ Transit (NJT) and the Port Authority of New York and New Jersey in the following four to eight weeks. A preliminary analysis done by the MTA recommended a fare of $4 for the bus service, less than the normal $5 express bus fare due to the additional cost of a $1.75 HBLR ticket. The fare would be $4.67 with monthly light rail pass and MetroCard discounts. This is in comparison with the fares charged by TransportAzumah, which were $3 to 34th Street station in Bayonne, and $5 to stops in Hoboken and Jersey City.

On July 16, 2007, the MTA formally announced that it would start this new bus route, the S89 Limited, in the fall. The route would provide an alternative method to getting to Midtown Manhattan via the HBLR and PATH, with buses having timed connections to the HBLR, and would connect residents of the island to the job market in Hoboken, Bayonne, and Jersey City. It would be the first interstate bus operated by the Metropolitan Transportation Authority (MTA), and be implemented under a joint agreement with NJ Transit (NJT). The MTA and NJT were also working toward an agreement that would allow riders of the S89 and the HBLR to purchase a joint monthly ticket. The Port Authority provided $2 million to help acquire the buses that would be used for the service. Since the route would go across state lines, bus operators on the route were USDOT certified. The creation of the interstate bus route was one of multiple initiatives being done by the MTA at the time to break institutional and political barriers, like the joint Train to the Game service between Secaucus Junction on NJT and Metro-North Railroad's New Haven Line.

Service would run on weekdays during peak hours, between 5:30 and 8:30 a.m., and between 4 and 7:30 p.m., running every 15 minutes in the peak direction and every 30 minutes in the reverse-peak direction. Ridership on the bus route was expected to be 1,200 a day. Nine buses would be required to run the service, which would cost about $1.4 million to operate. Service started on September 4, 2007. In January 2008, a joint $134 Unlimited Ride MetroCard and HBLR ticket became available for sale for S89 bus riders online from NJT. The pass would be flashed to fare inspectors on the HBLR.

On April 7, 2008, due to high ridership, two morning trips from Staten Island and one evening trip from New Jersey were added. At the time, 800 to 900 riders used the route per day.
