= New Springville, Staten Island =

Neighborhood in New York City

New Springville
- Neighborhood of Staten Island
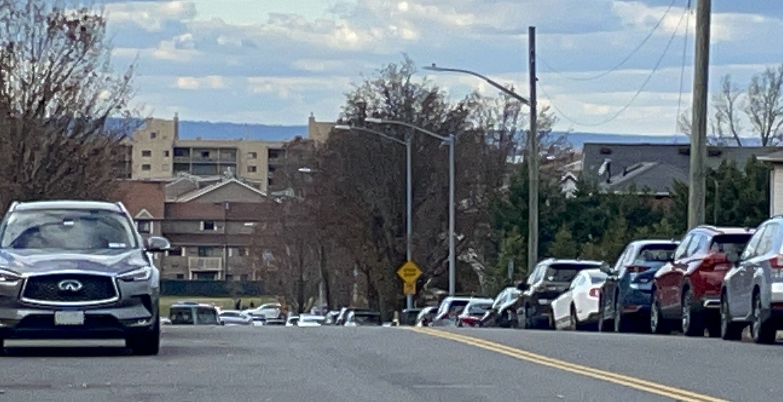
- Houses in New Springville
- Interactive map of New Springville
- Coordinates: 40°35′39″N 74°09′44″W
- Country: United States
- State: New York
- City: New York City
- Borough: Staten Island
- Founded: 1680

Demographics (2010)
- Time zone: UTC−5 (Eastern (EST))
  - Summer (DST): UTC−4 (EDT)
- ZIP Code: 10314
- Area codes: 718, 347, 929, and 917

New Springville is a neighborhood in Staten Island, one of the five boroughs of New York City, USA.

== History ==
Located near the island's geographical center, the neighborhood was founded in 1680 in Karle's Neck, so it was later named Karle's Neck Village. By the early 19th century, the community included a dock (on Richmond Creek) and several freshwater springs, leading to its being renamed first Springville, then later New Springville.

New Springville remained largely rural until 1964, when the E. J. Korvette department store chain opened an outlet on the site of a former chicken farm. This was also the year the Verrazzano Narrows Bridge opened, greatly increasing population growth to the whole island. This was followed, in 1973, by the opening of the Staten Island Mall on the grounds of what had been a little-used airport, which changed the character of the neighborhood completely; soon adjacent land was converted to business (mostly retail) use as well. Since then, New Springville has emerged as a commercial and administrative core, rivaling St. George. New Springville has also become a major public transportation hub, second in size on Staten Island only to that of the St. George ferry terminal; six city bus routes serve the area, including one going to Brooklyn, with the terminal at the Staten Island Mall on the Marsh Avenue side (the S79). The Yukon Bus Depot was opened in the early 1980s and can accommodate 380 buses.

The neighborhood is also known for its mafia presence. Some instances:

- On September 11, 1989, mob-connected developer Fred Weiss was shot to death outside of his girlfriend's New Springville apartment building. Weiss was indicted, and out of fear that he would cooperate, Gambino crime family boss John Gotti ordered Weiss's murder, and delegated the work to the DeCavalcante crime family. The hit was carried out by James Gallo and Vincent Palermo. The murder would end up resulting in multiple convictions for members of both crime families.
- In 1992, bar owner Michael Devine was shot to death in New Springville, allegedly on orders from Colombo family boss Alphonse Persico, because he had been carrying on a relationship with Persico's wife while Persico was imprisoned.
- In 2005, Gambino family capo Carmine Sciandra – accompanied by two Bonanno gangsters – was shot non-fatally outside of his Top Tomato supermarket by a former NYPD officer whose daughter had been an employee at the supermarket.

In addition to its explosive development as a business district, New Springville also experienced massive residential growth during the latter third of the 20th century, with thousands of single-family homes being built there, along with apartment and condominium complexes near the Staten Island Mall. In recent years, a new educational complex has been under construction near these apartments and condominiums. Completed is P.S. 58 (Space Shuttle Columbia School), an elementary school, and new intermediate and high schools have been completed.

The 19th-century LaTourette House was listed on the National Register of Historic Places in 1982.

== Transportation ==
Although New Springville is a major transportation hub and is well served relative to many other parts of Staten Island, it still has transportation problems. The S44, S59, S61, S79, S91 and S94 routes serve the area, but have no late-night service. There are also six express bus routes: The SIM4, SIM4C, SIM4X, SIM8, SIM8X and SIM31. Until 1995, New Springville had late-night bus service on the S59 route. As of June 28, 2010, however, there are no overnight buses in New Springville, the closest bus routes to New Springville during the overnight hours are the S74 bus on Arthur Kill Road at the Eltingville Transit Center to the south, and the S62 on Victory Boulevard to the north. Both of these routes are very far from the residential portion of New Springville, with the S74 and S62 being located in Eltingville and Bulls Head, respectively.

== Education ==
New Springville is served by eight schools, two of which are expeditionary learning schools. One school in New Springville is a charter school.

- two public elementary schools: P.S. 58 and P.S. 69.
- two intermediate schools: I.S. 72 and the Marsh Avenue School for Expeditionary Learning.
- three high schools: Gaynor McCown Expeditionary Learning School, College of Staten Island High School for International Studies, and the Richard H. Hungerford School.
- One Charter intermediate/high school: Richmond Preparatory Charter School.

== Demographics ==
For census purposes, the New York City Department of City Planning classifies New Springville as part of a larger Neighborhood Tabulation Area called New Springville-Willowbrook-Bulls Head-Travis SI0204. This designated neighborhood had 42,871 inhabitants based on data from the 2020 United States Census. This was an increase of 3,561 persons (9.1%) from the 39,310 counted in 2010. The neighborhood had a population density of 8.5 inhabitants per acre (14,500/sq mi; 5,600/km^{2}).

The racial makeup of the neighborhood was 59.5% (25,502) White (Non-Hispanic), 3.0% (1,295) Black (Non-Hispanic), 19.6% (8,401) Asian, and 2.6% (1,136) from two or more races. Hispanic or Latino of any race were 15.2% (6,537) of the population.

According to the 2020 United States Census, this area has many cultural communities of over 1,000 inhabitants. This include residents who identify as Mexican, Puerto Rican, Albanian, German, Irish, Italian, Polish, Russian, Egyptian, Korean, and Chinese.

71.0% of the households had at least one family present. Out of the 10,773 households, 51.0% had a married couple (20.7% with a child under 18), 4.4% had a cohabiting couple (1.4% with a child under 18), 16.8% had a single male (1.5% with a child under 18), and 27.9% had a single female (3.9% with a child under 18). 31.8% of households had children. In this neighborhood, 33.4% of non-vacant housing units are renter-occupied.
