= West Shore, Staten Island =

Area in New York City

Coordinates: 40.60835°N 74.18535°W

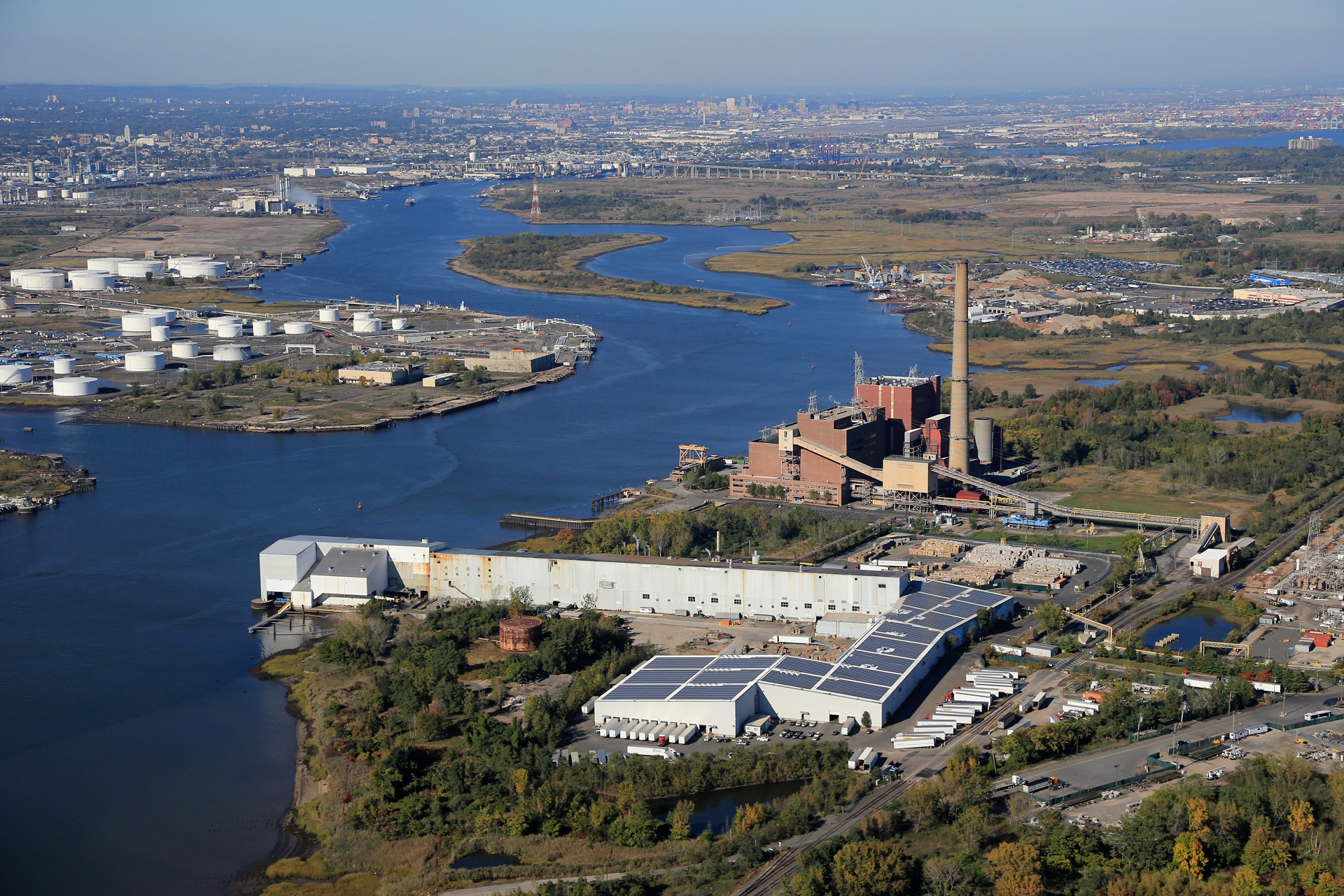
Pratt Industries paper mills on the West Shore of Staten Island.

West Shore refers to the section of the New York City borough of Staten Island that borders the Arthur Kill, between the Staten Island Expressway and the Fresh Kills. The Arthur Kill shoreline north of the expressway—most commonly called Port Ivory—is considered part of the North Shore, while the land along the Arthur Kill south of Fresh Kills is generally included within the South Shore.

While only one residential neighborhood—Travis—can actually be found on the West Shore, other place names are used to identify locations to the north of Travis, chief among them Bloomfield and Chelsea. A study by the New York City Department of City Planning also identified Howland Hook/Arlington, Rossville, Woodrow, Charleston and Tottenville as being part of the West Shore, along with Fresh Kills Park.

The West Shore Expressway, which connects the Staten Island Expressway with the Richmond Parkway at the Staten Island terminus of the Outerbridge Crossing, is the area's principal north-south thoroughfare, while the western end of Victory Boulevard, in Travis, is its main east-west road.

Through the late 20th century, land use in the West Shore was dominated by industrial activities (Travis was once named "Linoleumville" as a consequence of a linoleum factory having once been built there), most notably oil refining and construction; in the latter example, much property in the region is devoted to the storage of heavy equipment, such as cement mixers. These have led to some incidents, such as the 1973 Staten Island gas explosion, which killed 40 people. In addition, a few horse stables and riding academies exist in the area, which is the least densely populated section of Staten Island. Many species of migratory birds can be found in the area, especially on nearby Prall's Island.

In the 1980s, a string of large office complexes were built along South Avenue, which begins in Mariners Harbor on the North Shore, and ends in Travis; other businesses arrived later, including several hotels, Hilton Garden Inn in 2001, Hampton Inn & Suites in 2007, Comfort Inn and Holiday Inn Express in 2010. A large Con Edison electrical plant stands at the site of the former linoleum factory in Travis, which is also the home of the Teleport, a high-tech industrial park built in the early 1980s, mostly to house companies engaged in the communications industry. In Fall of 2018 the Matrix Global Logistics Park opened in Bloomfield, which is distribution center for companies such as Amazon and Ikea, bringing more than 2,000 jobs and development to the West Shore. In January, 2020 Amazon announced it will expand its footprint on Staten Island, leasing a 450,000 square foot warehouse next to its existing 855,000 sq. ft. fulfillment center.

The West Shore's vast expanses of unused land has made it the focus of many ambitious and controversial development proposals at the start of the 21st century. The most prominent of these involves the possible building of a NASCAR racetrack there — a plan that has engendered spirited debate in Staten Island political circles. A 2004 proposal included a 2.5-mile (4.0 km) oval track that would be constructed on a largely unused 440-acre (1.8 km^{2}) site.
