= List of bus routes in Staten Island =

Bus routes in New York City

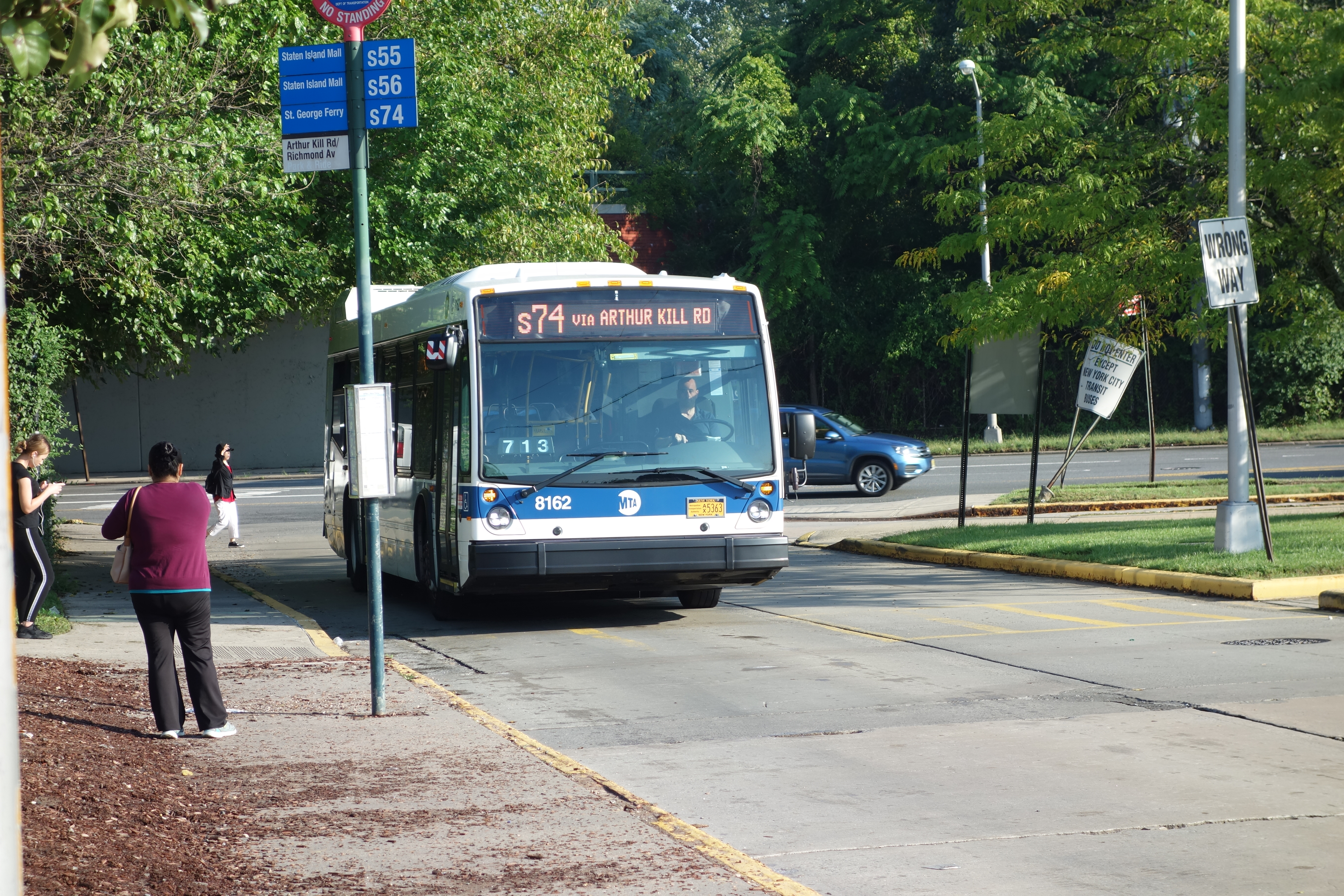
A Nova Bus LFS bus on the St. George-bound S74 at Eltingville Transit Center in September 2018

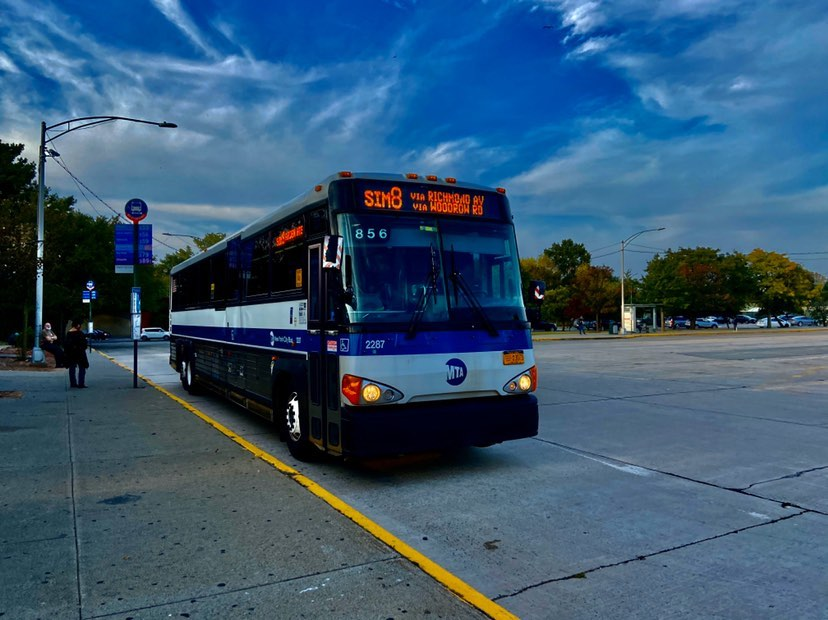
A MCI D4500CT bus on the Arden Heights-bound SIM8 at Eltingville Transit Center

The Metropolitan Transportation Authority (MTA) operates a number of bus routes in Staten Island, New York, United States. Some of them are the direct descendants of streetcar lines (see list of streetcar lines in Staten Island). Many of most routes run to the St. George Terminal, at St. George in northeastern Staten Island, where there are connections to the Staten Island Ferry.

== Routes ==
This table gives details for the routes prefixed with "S" - in other words, those considered to run primarily in Staten Island by the MTA. For details on routes with other prefixes, see the following articles:

- List of express bus routes in New York City: SIM1, SIM1C, SIM2, SIM3, SIM3C, SIM4, SIM4C, SIM5, SIM6, SIM7, SIM8, SIM9, SIM10, SIM11, SIM15, SIM22, SIM23, SIM24, SIM25, SIM26, SIM30, SIM31, SIM32, SIM33, SIM33C, SIM34, SIM35

Routes marked with an asterisk (*) run 24 hours a day. Connections to New York City Subway stations, the Staten Island Ferry, or Hudson–Bergen Light Rail at the bus routes' terminals are also listed where applicable.

=== Local Service ===
Route	Terminals			Major streets traveled	Service notes
S40*	St. George Ferry Terminal; Ramp D	↔	Bloomfield; Matrix Global Logistics Park	Richmond Terrace, South Avenue, Forest Avenue, Gulf Avenue	Peak direction buses start/terminate at South Avenue/Arlington Place when S90 is running.; S40/S90 extended to Matrix Global Logistics Park on September 23, 2018.
S42	St. George Ferry Terminal; Ramp D	↔	New Brighton; Clyde Place and Arnold Street	St. Marks Place, Brighton Avenue	Weekday rush hour and evening service only.
S44	St. George Ferry Terminal; Ramp D	↔	New Springville; Yukon Avenue and Forest Hill Road	Richmond Terrace, Henderson Avenue, Cary Avenue, Post Avenue, Richmond Avenue	No overnight service.; Serves Staten Island Mall.; Some buses start service at Nicholas Av/Charles Av on school days, providing service to Port Richmond High School.
S46*	St. George Ferry Terminal; Ramp C	↔	Chelsea; West Shore Plaza	Castleton Avenue, South Avenue	Fare-free service for six to 12 months started on September 24, 2023, and ended August 31, 2024.; Also serves the Teleport in Bloomfield weekdays only.; When the S96 is running, buses terminate/start in Mariners Harbor.; Some buses start service at Nicholas Av/Charles Av, terminating in Mariners Harbor, on school days, providing service to Port Richmond High School.
S48*	St. George Ferry Terminal; Ramp C	↔	Arlington; Holland Avenue and Richmond Terrace	Victory Boulevard, Forest Avenue	Some buses start/end at Richmond Avenue during rush hours in the peak direction.
S51*	St. George Ferry Terminal; Ramp B	↔	Grant City; Lincoln Avenue and Richmond Road	Bay Street, Father Capodanno Boulevard, Midland Avenue	Some trips run via Fort Wadsworth, 7 days a week.; Some AM rush trips and all PM rush trips start/end at South Beach in the peak direction.
S52	St. George Ferry Terminal; Ramp D	↔	South Beach; Staten Island University Hospital	Jersey Street, Tompkins Avenue, Fingerboard Road, Father Capodanno Boulevard	No overnight service.
S53*	Port Richmond; Richmond Terrace and Park Avenue	↔	Bay Ridge, Brooklyn; 86th Street and 4th Avenue at 86th St ( R train)	Castleton Avenue, Broadway, Clove Road, McClean Avenue, Fort Hamilton Parkway (Brooklyn)	Travels between Staten Island and Brooklyn via the Verrazzano–Narrows Bridge.
S54	West New Brighton; Richmond Terrace and Broadway	↔	Eltingville; Richmond Avenue and Hylan Boulevard	Manor Road, Brielle Avenue, Arthur Kill Road, Giffords Lane, Nelson Avenue	Weekday service only.
S55	New Springville; Ring Road and Marsh Avenue at Staten Island Mall	↔	Rossville; Bloomingdale Road and Veterans Road East	Amboy Road, Annadale Road, Richmond Avenue	Weekday service only.
S56	New Springville; Ring Road and Marsh Avenue at Staten Island Mall	↔	Huguenot; Luten Avenue and Eyelandt Street	Foster Road, Woodrow Road, Arden Avenue, Arthur Kill Road, Richmond Avenue	Weekday service only.; On school days, some PM S56 trips operates from Tottenville High School to Woodrow Road/Foster Road. These trips then become S74 buses to Tottenville or thee Eltingville Transit Center. Passengers are allowed on without paying an additional fare as the bus switches routes. The same happens in the reverse order during AM hours.
S57	Port Richmond; Richmond Terrace and Park Avenue	↔	Oakwood Heights; Hylan Boulevard and Ebbitts Street	Amboy Road, Rockland Avenue, Bradley Avenue, Willowbrook Road	No overnight service.; Some buses run between Port Richmond and Brielle Avenue on school days, providing service to Susan E. Wagner High School.; Some buses run between Lindbergh Avenue/Clawson Street and Port Richmond on school days, providing service to Staten Island Technical High School.
S59	Port Richmond; Richmond Terrace and Park Avenue	↔	Eltingville; Hylan Boulevard and Richmond Avenue	Port Richmond Avenue, Richmond Avenue	No overnight service.; Tottenville served rush hours only.; Some trips serve Tottenville High School at Luten Avenue/Eylandt Street.
S59	Port Richmond; Richmond Terrace and Park Avenue	↔	Tottenville; Main Street and Amboy Road	Port Richmond Avenue, Richmond Avenue, Hylan Boulevard	No overnight service.; Tottenville served rush hours only.; Some trips serve Tottenville High School at Luten Avenue/Eylandt Street.
S61	St. George Ferry Terminal; Ramp A	↔	New Springville; Yukon Avenue and Forest Hill Road	Victory Boulevard, Bradley Avenue, Forest Hill Road	Does not run to St. George during weekday AM rush hours, replaced by S91 bus.; No overnight service.
S62*	St. George Ferry Terminal; Ramp A	↔	Travis; Wild Avenue and Victory Boulevard	Victory Boulevard	Weekdays and Saturdays, short-turns run between St. George and the College of Staten Island. Late nights, buses bypass College of Staten Island loop.
S66	St. George Ferry Terminal; Ramp A	↔	Port Richmond; Richmond Terrace and Park Avenue	Victory Boulevard, Howard Avenue, Jewett Avenue	Weekday service only.; Via Grymes Hill.
S74*	St. George Ferry Terminal; Ramp B	↔	Charleston; Bricktown Centre at Charleston	Van Duzer/Targee Streets, Richmond Road, Arthur Kill Road	Some buses start/terminate at the Eltingville Transit Center during weekday rush hours and throughout the day on weekends.; Some buses run between New Dorp Lane/Mill Road and St. George on school days, providing service to New Dorp High School; On school days, some AM S74 trips operates from Main Street/Craig Avenue in Tottenville or the Eltingville Transit Center to Rossville Avenue/Woodrow Road. These trips then become S56 buses to Tottenville High School. Passengers are allowed on without paying an additional fare as the bus switches routes. The same happens in the reverse order during PM hours.
S76	St. George Ferry Terminal; Ramp B	↔	Oakwood Beach; Mill Road and Delwit Avenue	Bay Street, Vanderbilt Avenue, Richmond Road, New Dorp Lane	Weekend service restored January 2013.; Some buses run between New Dorp Lane/Mill Road and St. George on school days, providing service to New Dorp High School.; Some buses terminate at Clove Road during the PM rush.
S78*	St. George Ferry Terminal; Ramp C	↔	Charleston; Bricktown Centre at Charleston	Tompkins Avenue, Hylan Boulevard, Arthur Kill Road	Route description: The S78 begins at St George Ferry Terminal, then turns left to Bay Street, continues until it turns right to Victory Boulevard, It turns left to Saint Paul's Avenue, continues to Beach Street, then turns right to Canal Street, The bus turns left and continues to Tompkins Avenue and turns right on Hylan Boulevard and continues all the way until it reaches Amboy Road and then turns right and continues until it turns right to Arthur Kill Rd continues all the way until it reaches its destination, Bricktown Mall.: Some buses run between St. George Ferry and Luten Avenue on school days, providing service to Tottenville High School.; Some buses run between New Dorp Lane/Mill Road and St. George Ferry, or Richmond Avenue on school days, providing service to New Dorp High School.; Alternate weekend daytime buses start/end at Richmond Avenue.; Longest local bus route in New York City, spanning 19.7 miles overall.

=== S79 Select Bus Service ===
Operated as a Select Bus Service (SBS) route, the S79 provides service at all times. Originally a local route, the S79 was converted to an SBS route in 2012, with the number of stops cut by about three-quarters. But unlike the SBS buses in the rest of New York City, the S79 has no fare machines at bus stops, so fares are collected onboard the bus and rear-door boarding is prohibited.

Route	Terminals			Streets traveled	History and notes
S79	New Springville; Ring Road and Marsh Avenue at Staten Island Mall	↔	Bay Ridge, Brooklyn; 86th Street and 4th Avenue at 86th Street ( R train)	Staten Island: Richmond Avenue, Hylan Boulevard, Narrows Road; Brooklyn: 92nd Street, 4th Avenue, 86th Street, Fort Hamilton Parkway	Started as a branch of the S78 to the Staten Island Mall in the late 1980s.; Northern terminal moved to Bay Ridge, Brooklyn on September 13, 1992 as part of the MTA's Fare Deal improvements program.; Local service available on the S59 (Richmond Avenue) and S78 (Hylan Boulevard).; Transfers available from the S59 or S78 to the S79 SBS without loss of the transfer.; Travels between Staten Island and Brooklyn via the Verrazzano–Narrows Bridge.; Some buses run between New Dorp Lane/Mill Road and Bay Ridge on school days, providing service to New Dorp High School.; Some buses run between Lindbergh Avenue/Clawson Street and Bay Ridge on school days, providing service to Staten Island Technical High School.

=== Limited-Stop Service ===
All limited-stop services, except for the S89 and S93, duplicate the routes of their respective local services. The S93 runs weekdays from 6:00am to 10:00pm. Other routes run weekday rush hours only.

Route	Terminals			Streets traveled	Limited-stop version of	History and notes
S81	St. George Ferry Terminal; Ramp B	→ PM	Grant City; Lincoln Avenue and Richmond Road	Bay Street, Father Capodanno Boulevard, Midland Avenue	S51	Began service in 2001.; PM service only to Grant City.; All trips operate via Fort Wadsworth.
S84	St. George Ferry Terminal; Ramp B	→ PM	Charleston; Bricktown Centre at Charleston	Van Duzer/Targee Streets, Richmond Road, Arthur Kill Road	S74	In May 2002, the MTA announced plans to create the S84 route as an evening peak period, peak-direction limited-stop variant of the S74. Service would operate between 4:30 p.m. and 6:00 p.m.. During this time period, two S84 buses were scheduled within three minutes of each other to meet each ferry trip to accommodate passenger volumes from each boat. Since the S84 would help 63 percent of evening peak period, peak direction riders south of Richmond Avenue by saving five minutes of travel time, the pair of buses would be more evenly loaded. S84 limited-stop service would not be implemented in the AM rush hour since limited-stop service was only implemented when a route had service running at least every five minutes, and service on the S51 in the morning rush hour ran every eight to ten minutes. Service was going to be implemented in fall 2002.; PM service only to Charleston.
S86	St. George Ferry Terminal; Ramp B	→ PM	Oakwood Beach; Mill Road and Delwit Avenue	Bay Street, Vanderbilt Avenue, Richmond Road, New Dorp Lane	S76	Began service on September 8, 2003 to reduce travel times along the S76. Service would make limited-stops to Narrow Road South and then make local stops to Oakwood. Service would operate between 4:50 and 10 p.m. on weekdays.; PM service only to Oakwood Beach.
S89	Eltingville; Hylan Boulevard and Richmond Avenue	↔	Bayonne, New Jersey; Hudson–Bergen Light Rail at 34th Street	Richmond Avenue, New Jersey Route 440	S59	Began service in September 2007.; No stops between 34th Street HBLR station and Elm Park in Staten Island.; Travels between Staten Island and New Jersey via the Bayonne Bridge.; Rush hour service only.
S90	St. George Ferry Terminal; Ramp D	← AM → PM	Bloomfield; Matrix Global Logistics Park	Richmond Terrace, South Avenue, Forest Avenue, Gulf Avenue	S40	Began service in 1998.; S40/S90 extended to Matrix Global Logistics Park on September 23, 2018.; AM hours to St. George and PM hours to Matrix Global Logistics Park.; Originally ran PM rush hours only.; AM rush hour service introduced in September 2006.
S91	St. George Ferry Terminal; Ramp A	← AM → PM	New Springville; Yukon Avenue and Forest Hill Road	Victory Boulevard, Bradley Avenue, Forest Hill Road	S61	AM hours to St. George and PM hours to New Springville.; In 2007, a stop was added at Forest Avenue and Victory Boulevard.
S92	St. George Ferry Terminal; Ramp A	← AM → PM	Travis; Wild Avenue and Victory Boulevard	Victory Boulevard	S62	AM hours to St. George and PM hours to Travis.; In 2007, a stop was added at Forest Avenue and Victory Boulevard.
S93	Willowbrook; College of Staten Island	↔	Bay Ridge, Brooklyn; 87th Street and 4th Avenue near 86th Street ( R train)	Victory Boulevard, Narrows Road, Fort Hamilton Parkway, 86th Street	Parts of S53 and S62	In July 2001, the MTA announced plans to create the weekday peak period S93 Limited route as a variant of the S53 to provide direct service from Brooklyn to Victory Boulevard and the College of Staten Island. The additional service was expected to cost $112,000 a year. The new route would eliminate double fares and transfers for people transferring to and from the subway in Brooklyn, and save riders up to 15 minutes in each direction. Service, which would start with three trips in each direction, was going to be implemented in September 2001. Trips would leave from Brooklyn at 6:55 a.m., 7:55 a.m., and 8:55 a.m. in the morning, and from Staten Island at 3 p.m., 5 p.m., and 7 p.m.. The service was expected to benefit at least 2,300 students. Service began on August 27, 2001.; Travels between Staten Island and Brooklyn via the Verrazzano–Narrows Bridge.; Reverse-peak service (and additional stops along Narrows Road South/North) added September 2006.; On April 9, 2007, service was added along Narrows Road at Fingerboard Road, Hylan Boulevard, Targee Street, Richmond Road. On May 21, 2007, the route's terminal was moved to the southwestern corner off 87th Street and Fourth Avenue during rush hours to reduce congestion at the intersection of Fourth Avenue and 86th Street.; Extended further into the College of Staten Island campus January 2013.; Midday and evening service was added on September 2, 2014 as part of $4.9 million in service enhancements made to service across the city.
S94	St. George Ferry Terminal; Ramp D	← AM → PM	New Springville; Yukon Avenue and Forest Hill Road	Richmond Terrace, Henderson Avenue, Cary Avenue, Post Avenue, Richmond Avenue	S44	Service began on September 11, 1994, and was implemented as the third limited-stop service on Staten Island, after the S91 and S92, as part of New York City Transit's Fare Deal Ridership Growth Service Initiative. The route was approved at the May 1994 MTA Board meeting.; S94 trips were implemented by converting some existing local trips to provide passengers traveling longer distances with quicker trips to and from St. George.; Service to St. George initially ran between 7:00 a.m. and 8:15 a.m. and service from St. George initially ran between 5:00 p.m. and 6:30 p.m.; AM hours to St. George and PM hours to New Springville.; Buses make all local stops west of Jewett Avenue and Post Avenue.
S96	St. George Ferry Terminal; Ramp C	← AM → PM	Chelsea; West Shore Plaza or Bloomfield; Teleport	Castleton Avenue, South Avenue	S46	Service began in September 1996, operating in the PM rush hour between 4:50 and 6:30 p.m. westbound. Stops chosen for the S96 included high-ridership S46 stops, transfer locations and stops near major destinations. It was implemented to speed up trips for S46 riders traveling the farthest by about five minutes. Service was implemented by converting selected existing S46 trips. S96 service only made limited stops from St. George to Port Richmond Avenue along Castleton Avenue.; AM hours to St. George and PM hours to Chelsea.; AM rush hour service introduced in September 2006.; Fare-free service for six to 12 months started on September 24, 2023, and ended August 31, 2024.
S98	St. George Ferry Terminal; Ramp C	← AM → PM	Arlington; Holland Avenue and Richmond Terrace	Victory Boulevard, Forest Avenue	S48	Service began in March 1995.; Service to St. George initially ran between 7:00 a.m. and 8:30 a.m. and service from St. George initially ran between 5:00 p.m. and 6:30 p.m.; S98 trips were implemented by converting some existing local trips to provide passengers traveling longer distances with quicker trips to and from St. George.; AM hours to St. George and PM hours to Arlington.; Buses make all local stops west of Forest Avenue and Richmond Avenue.

== Bus route history ==
Except for the S61, all current Staten Island bus routes originally had different designations before they were renumbered by service patterns, as follows:

- S4x: North Shore services
- S5x: North-south cross-island services
- S6x: Victory Boulevard services
- S7x: South Shore services
- S8x & S9x: Limited-stop versions of their respective local routes ending in the same number. (Ex: S62/S92, S48/S98). S8x routes provide north-south limited stop service while S9x routes provide east-west limited stop service. The S81, S84, and S86 are limited-stop versions of the S51, S74, and S76 respectively, while the S91, S94, and S96 are limited-stop versions of the S61, S44, and S46 respectively.

On April 2, 1989, routes on the North Shore of Staten Island were renumbered.

The implementation of this numbering scheme was completed on April 15, 1990, when the final eight routes, all from St. George, were renumbered.

Old and new routes are given below, along with discontinued service patterns. In addition, before 1975, routes were designated with R (for Richmond, the borough's official name before 1975) instead of S. The R designation is shown in the "Old Route" section.

Old route	Terminals		Streets traveled	New route	History
R1	St. George Ferry Ramp "A"	Port Ivory	Richmond Terrace	S40	Original western terminal was Port Ivory (Procter & Gamble Plant on Western Avenue); Renumbered the S1, and then the S40 on April 2, 1989. On this date the route's western terminus was swapped with the S107, which was renumbered the S48 at the same time. Free transfers began being offered to the S46 and the S48.; Port Ivory service was later discontinued (resulting in South Avenue receiving service from both routes); In November 1997, the MTA Board voted to approve an extension of the S40 to the newly reopened Howland Hook Container Terminal on Western Avenue. The extension took effect on January 12, 1998. Service to Howland Hook would operate between 5:30 a.m. and midnight. Howland Hook had been served by the S48 until 1995, when that service was cut back since most factories in the area had closed. At the time, NYCT said it would restore service if Howland Hook reopened. NYCT elected to extend the S40 instead of restoring S48 service since the route was closer to the facility. The extension was expected to cost $54,000 a year, and provide $20,000 in additional revenue. A bus shelter would be constructed for the extension by Howland Hook.; When the apartment buildings on Holland Avenue were built, the end of the line was Holland Avenue and Richmond Terrace, with only certain trips to Howland Hook to accommodate the employees' work schedules; A.M. rush hour service was supplemented by service from Andros Ave and Richmond Terrace to the ferry and Park Avenue & Richmond Terrace to the ferry; P.M. rush hour service was also supplemented with the same destinations in reverse
R2	St. George Ferry Ramp "B"	R2MB: Lincoln Avenue & Richmond Road, Grant City.; R2SB: Sand Lane & Seaside (now Father Capodanno) Boulevard, South Beach.	R2MB: Bay Street, Seaside (now Father Capodanno) Boulevard, Lincoln Avenue, Midland Avenue.; R2SB: Bay Street, McClean Avenue, Olympia Boulevard.	S51	R2MB became the S2, and then the S51 on April 15, 1990.; R2MB Summer Service - certain trips were terminated and originated at Midland Beach Bus Loop (Jefferson Avenue & Seaside (now Father Capodanno) Boulevard); Service from Midnight to 5 a.m. was terminated at Midland Avenue and Kiswick Street; R2SB discontinued; Arrochar segment merged into the S104; In January 1990, alternate buses began running through Fort Wadsworth between 6 a.m. and 10 p.m. Around January 12, 1991, the grounds of the United States Naval Station at the Fort were closed to the public due to security concerns due to the beginning of the Gulf War. The restriction became permanent after the war.; On March 27, 1995, alternate S51 buses during weekday rush hours in the off-peak direction, from St. George between 6 a.m. and 9 a.m. and from Grant City between 3 and 5:30 p.m. They began running through Fort Wadsworth at the request of the Defense Logistics Agency, which moved several employees to the Fort. Other alternatives considered included diverting all S51 service between 6 a.m.. and 7 p.m. and diverting the S53 and reverse peak-direction express bus trips.
R3	St. George Ferry Ramp "C"	Walloon Street & Maple Parkway, Mariners' Harbor	Castleton Avenue, Clove Road, Richmond Terrace, Nicholas Avenue, Innis Street, Morningstar Road, Walker Street.	S46	Renumbered the S3, and then the S46 on April 2, 1989.; Extended to Grandview & Forest Avenues, Mariners Harbor and later Chelsea (West Shore Plaza).; Service was extended to West Shore Plaza on June 26, 1994 from Grandview Avenue and Forest Avenue from 8:30 a.m. to 11 p.m. weekdays and Saturdays and from 9 a.m. to 7:30 p.m., corresponding with the shopping center's hours. Service was extended in response to requests for the extension from the office of the Staten Island Borough President, the Staten Island Chamber of Commerce, the owner of the shopping center and other groups. Before the extension, there was no bus service to the Plaza, requiring employees and shoppers to walk a mile from the S62 bus. NYCT studied extensions of the S40, S46, S48 and S62, and decided to extend the S46 because it did not make diversions and did not branch, for its connections to other bus routes and the SIR, because it connected to a large apartment complex, and because it offered good accessibility to residential areas on the North Shore. The extension also provided access to the Teleport, an office park constructed by the Port Authority. The extension was done through an agreement with the developer of the shopping center, and required the elimination of some parking spaces. The extension received more ridership than expected, with an additional 450 riders compared to the projected 200 to 250 riders. In June 1996, the span of service in the peak hour in the off-peak direction was increased in the morning for workers and early morning shoppers, with the first bus leaving St. George at 6 a.m.; The opening of the Teleport, on South Avenue, prompted limited service in conjunction with employee work hours. Service began on August 29, 2011.; A.M. & P.M. rush hour service was supplemented with additional trips to & from Clove Road & Richmond Terrace to the ferry and Park Avenue & Richmond Terrace to the ferry
R4	Park Avenue & Richmond Terrace, Port Richmond	Richmond Road & Rockland Avenue, Richmondtown	Richmond Avenue, Eltingville, Nelson Avenue, Giffords Lane, Arthur Kill Road, Richmond Road.	S59 S54	Originally operated between Park Avenue & Richmond Terrace, Port Richmond, and Donovan Hughes Airport, New Springville (see R114); Renumbered S4.; On September 13, 1987, a new branch of the S4 was created to serve Tottenville High School via Hylan Boulevard.; S59 assumed entire Richmond Avenue service; S54 assumed Nelson Avenue and Giffords Lane service (along with R110 service); On March 15, 1995, NYCT announced plans to discontinue service off-peak between Hylan Boulevard and Richmond Avenue and Tottenville. In addition, service on the branch to Forest Avenue and Willowbrook Road would be discontinued between 1 and 5 a.m. The changes were expected to save $133,000 a year. The nighttime service elimination only affected 45 riders.
R5	St. George Ferry Ramp "E"	Beach Street & Water Street, Stapleton	Jersey Street, Cebra Avenue, Richmond Terrace	S52	Current northern segment of the S52
R6	St. George Ferry Ramp "A"	Charles Avenue & Richmond (Port Richmond) Avenue, Port Richmond	Victory Boulevard, Grymes Hill, Jewett Avenue	S66 S60	Originally a 24 hour through route and a weekday Grymes Hill shuttle (S6S); Through route designated S66, and destination changed to Park Avenue and Richmond Terrace; S6S shuttle re-designated S60; On March 15, 1995, NYCT announced plans to discontinue weekend S60 service, which operated between 10 a.m. and 6 p.m.. There had been a previous plan to eliminate this service a few years earlier that was met with strong opposition. It was also announced that service on the S66 would be eliminated on weekends and between 1 and 5 a.m. weekdays.; The change to the S60 was expected to save $32,000 a year and affect approximately 50 people each weekend, while the S66 change was expected to save $309,000 a year.; On September 10, 1995, S66 service stopped running 24 hours every day of the week. Weekend service was discontinued, and weekday service was cut back to run toward St. George between 4 a.m. and 12:15 a.m. and to Port Richmond between 4:30 a.m. and 1 a.m.. Weekend S60 service, which was proposed for elimination at a May public hearing, was kept.; Grymes Hill shuttle merged into the S66 in 2010
R7	95th Street & 4th Avenue, Bay Ridge, Brooklyn	Richmond Terrace & Park Avenue, Port Richmond	Mclean Avenue, Sand Lane, Hylan Boulevard, Clove Road, Broadway, Castleton Avenue	S53	The route began service on November 21, 1964, running over the Verrazzano–Narrows Bridge, which opened on the same date. The route operated from the 95th Street subway station to Clove Road and Victory Boulevard. Weekend passengers used the route seeking a scenic ride in its first year of operation.; Extended to Port Richmond on November 3, 1965.; Sunnyside short-turn (to Seneca Ave and Victory Boulevard) discontinued. Eventually replaced with the S93 in 2001 after the relocation of the College of Staten Island to Willowbrook (which took place in 2001).; R7 Special - When the Sunnyside campus of the College of Staten Island first opened, heavy ridership demands were met with scheduled "limited stop" service at certain times of the day. The trips originated at 95th Street and 4th Avenue went express, along the Staten Island Expressway to Richmond Road, making a stop there and again at Clove Road then onto the College to coincide with peak class times.; From November 1994 to January 1996 line was rerouted onto Old Town Road between Hylan Boulevard and Richmond Road due to the closing and replacement of the Clove Road-Staten Island Railway Overpass.
R7A	Bay Ridge, Brooklyn	Midland Beach bus loop (Jefferson Avenue and Seaside (Father Capodanno) Boulevard)	Seaside Boulevard	N/A	Discontinued, not renumbered (due to duplication with R7); Summer service only
R8X	Adams Street and Fulton Street, Downtown Brooklyn	Church Street and Richmond (Port Richmond) Avenue, Port Richmond	Clove Road, Broadway	N/A	Began service on November 3, 1965.; Service discontinued in the 1990s; Clove Road serviced today by the SIM35
R101	St. George Ferry Ramp "E"	Havenwood Road and Forest Avenue, Silver Lake: or -; Clyde Place and Arnold Street, New Brighton	Central Avenue, Hyatt Street, St. Marks Place, Jersey Street, Brighton Avenue	S42	Renumbered S101 and then S42 on April 15, 1990.; On September 10, 1995, service began operating every 15 minutes instead of every 12 between 6 a.m. and 10 p.m.; Silver Lake service discontinued in 2010 (except for school trippers) and never replaced.
R102	St. George Ferry Ramp "D"	Park Avenue and Richmond Terrace, Port Richmond	Richmond Terrace, Lafayette Street, Henderson Avenue, Cary Avenue Post Avenue, Richmond (Port Richmond) Avenue.	S44	Rush hour service to and from Post Avenue and Jewett Avenue; Every other trip extended southward to the Staten Island Mall in September 1980.
R103	St. George Ferry Ramp "E"	Craig Avenue and Amboy Road, Tottenville	Tompkins Avenue, Hylan Boulevard	S78 S79	Other Tottenville destination changes: Craig Avenue & Butler Place and Main Street and Amboy Road; Alternate destination: Richmond Ave and Hylan Boulevard; School service to and from Lindberg Avenue & Clawson Street (Old New Dorp High School), Huguenot Avenue and Hylan Boulevard (E. Berstein Intermediate School, Yetman Avenue and Manhattan Street (Old Tottenville High School), Luten Avenue and Eylandt Street (New Tottenville High School), New Dorp Lane and Mill Road (New-New Dorp High School); R103S: A summer only route, the Great Kills Park Shuttle ran from the park entrance at Hylan Boulevard to the main parking lot. The route was discontinued in the late 1980s.; Every other trip rerouted along Richmond Avenue to the Staten Island Mall in September 1980.; Renumbered S103, and on April 15, 1990, Tottenville service was numbered the S78, and Staten Island Mall service was numbered the S79.; Staten Island Mall service rerouted from St. George to Bay Ridge, Brooklyn in 1992 over the Verrazzano–Narrows Bridge.; S78 extended to Bricktown Mall in 2011 with the opening of the Charleston Depot, which is behind the mall
R104	St. George Ferry Ramp "E"	Sand Lane and Seaside (now Father Capodanno Boulevard, South Beach)	Tompkins Avenue, Fingerboard Road.	S52	Merged with R5 and Arrochar segment of R2MB; Renumbered S104, and then S52 on April 15, 1990.; Extended to Staten Island Hospital in Midland Beach
R105	Richmond Terrace and Jewett Avenue	Sand Lane and Seaside (now Father Capodanno Boulevard, South Beach)	Broadway, Clove Road	N/A	Discontinued on November 3, 1965.
R106	Victory Boulevard and Watchogue Road, Castleton Corners	Park Avenue & Richmond Terrace, Port Richmond	Victory Boulevard, Watchogue Road, Willowbrook Road, Decker Avenue	S57 S67	Rush hour service to & from Ramp "A", St. George Ferry to Port Richmond.; Later merged with the R111 and re-numbered S111/106 service between Port Richmond and Eltingville, some rush hour ferry service.; Entire routing became S67 upon renumbering; discontinued 2010; Northern segment (north of Victory Boulevard) became northern segment of extended R111, today's S57
R107	St. George Ferry Ramp "C"	Grandview and Forest Avenues, Mariners Harbor; Port Ivory	Victory Boulevard, Forest Avenue	S48	Renumbered S107, and then the S48 on April 2, 1989. On that date, the hours of service to Holland Avenue and Richmond Terrace were extended, with some trips now running to Howland Hook to serve works in Port Ivory, taking over the western terminal of the S1, then renumbered the S40.; On March 15, 1995, NYCT announced plans to truncate service from Howland Hook to Arlington Place and South Avenue in Mariners Harbor. This change was expected to save $22,000 a year, took effect on September 10, 1995.; Service to Mariners Harbor extended to Holland Avenue & Richmond Terrace, Arlington
R108	St. George Ferry Ramp "B"	Centre Street and St. Patricks Place, Richmondtown	Bay Street, Broad Street, Targee Street, Richmond Road. Mostly a rush hour service.	S74	Mostly a rush hour service; Short-turn of the R113 (see R113 below)
R109	St. George Ferry Ramp "B"	Patterson and Midland Avenues, Midland Beach	Bay Street, Vanderbilt Avenue, Richmond Road, Midland Avenue	S72	Renumbered S109, and then S72 on April 15, 1990.; Discontinued in the early 1990s. S76 rerouted to Vanderbilt Avenue; S51 extended to Midland Avenue and Richmond Road.
R110	Richmond Terrace and Broadway, West New Brighton	Seaview Hospital	Manor Road	S54	School sessions – extra service to/and from Brielle Avenue & Manor Road; Extended to Eltingville via Richmondtown and Great Kills portion of R4 to form the S54
R111	Victory Boulevard and Watchogue Road, Castleton Corners	Adelaide Avenue & Hylan Boulevard, Oakwood	Bradley Avenue, Rockland Avenue, Richmond Road, Amboy Road, Guyon Avenue	S57	Original southern terminus was New Dorp Plaza (see R118 below); Oakwood destination changed to Ebbits Street and Hylan Boulevard, New Dorp in the 1980s; Some rush hour service to and from Ramp "A", Staten Island Ferry; School Service, to and from Msgr. Farrell High School; Predecessor to the S57 was the R111/106 combination; Service to Staten Island Ferry truncated at Victory Boulevard, and extended over the western end of R106 to Port Richmond to form S57; On March 15, 1995, NYCT announced plans to eliminate service between 11 p.m. and 1:30 a.m. The change was expected to save $82,000 a year. On September 10, 1995, the span of service was decreased. Service on weekdays started running between 5:35 a.m. and 11:25 p.m. to Port Richmond, and between 4:50 a.m. and 11:30 p.m. to New Dorp. Weekends, service would operate between 5:25 a.m. and 11:25 p.m. to Port Richmond, and between 4:40 a.m. to 11:10 p.m. to New Dorp.
R112	Victory Boulevard and Watchogue Road, Castleton Corners	End of Victory Boulevard, Travis	Victory Boulevard	S62	Same route, new number; Originally a shuttle from St. George to Victory Boulevard/Jewett Avenue rush hours only, operating between Meiers Corners and Travis other times; Limited weekend special service to Willowbrook State School from Ramp "A" St. George Ferry and return to coincide with visitor hours; When the College of Staten Island campus first opened, limited trips to and from the campus entrance; Extended the full length of Victory Boulevard and S92 implemented in the early 1990s
R113	St. George Ferry Ramp "B"	Craig Avenue & Butler Place, Tottenville	Bay Street, Broad Street, Targee Street, Richmond Road, Arthur Kill Road	S74	Renumbered S113, and then S74 on April 15, 1990.; Originally operated only between Richmondtown Restoration and Tottenville (see R108); Tottenville destination changed to Main Street and Amboy Road; Extended to loop Rossville Avenue, Woodrow Road, and Bloomingdale Road in 1995; Service truncated from Tottenville to Bricktown Mall in 2011 with the opening of the Charleston Depot, which is behind the mall; R108 was a short-turn of the R113
R114	Richmondtown Restoration	Donovan Hughes Airport	—N/a	S59 S54	Later part of R4
R115-116	Princes Bay-Rossville- Arden Heights loop		Rossville Avenue, Foster Road, Amboy Road, Seguine Avenue, Arthur Kill Road, Arden; Avenue, Annadale Road, Huguenot Avenue	S55 S56	The R115 and R116 were merged on February 1, 1948.; Renumbered S115, and on September 13, 1987, the route was split into S55 (clockwise) and S56 (counter-clockwise), as a loop service with layover at Tottenville High School. Service on Seguine Avenue between Hylan Boulevard and Johnson Terrace at Purdy Place was discontinued. Service was rerouted off of Huguenot Avenue to Luten Avenue to serve Tottenville High School. Bus service was scheduled to connect with the SIRT at Annadale.; Route restructured in about 1988 to serve the Staten Island Mall; S55 via Annadale Road; S56 via Foster Road, Rossville Avenue and Arthur Kill Road.; On March 15, 1995, NYCT announced plans to eliminate service between 6 p.m. and 10:30 p.m. The change was expected to save $183,000 a year. The route had the least revenue from fares of any route in the system since about 80 percent of riders were children heading to school. After 6 p.m., only 40 people used the route each day. On September 10, 1995, the span of service was decreased, with service ending at 7 p.m. instead of 10:30 p.m.; On May 23, 2007, the MTA Board approved an extension of the S55 to Arthur Kill Correctional Facility via Amboy Road and Bloomingdale Road to serve the South Shore. Service would run by Luten Avenue, Hylan Boulevard, Seguine Avenue, Amboy Road, Bloomingdale Road, and Arthur Kill Road. The service change took effect on September 4, 2007. Bus service on both of the S55 and S56 also began running more frequently-every 30 minutes instead of every 40 minutes. Service was then cut back to Veterans Road in 2011 with the closing of the facility
R117	St. George Ferry Ramp "B"	Tarlton Street and Foxbeach Avenue, Oakwood Beach	Targee Street, Richmond Road, New Dorp Lane, Cedargrove Avenue, Ebbits Street, Mill Road	S76	Originally operated only between New Dorp Plaza and Oakwood Beach; Renumbered S117, and then S76 on April 15, 1990.; Rerouted in Clifton via Vanderbilt Avenue and Bay Street; On March 15, 1995, NYCT announced plans to cut back service from Fobeach Avenue and Mill Road in Oakwood Beach to Tysens Lane and Mill Road in New Dorp due to budget cuts. This change was expected to save $270,000 a year. The change took effect on September 10, 1995.; In Oakwood, buses no longer travel down Fox Beach Avenue and Tarlton Street due to narrowness of streets; New terminal is located at Delwit Avenue and Mill Road
R118	New Dorp Plaza	Oakwood Beach	New Dorp Lane, Amboy Road, Guyon Avenue, Mill Road	N/A	Discontinued in 1959. Became part of R111 when Monsignor Farrell High School opened at its present location in 1962.
