= Staten Island Mall =

Coordinates: 40°34′54″N 74°9′56″W

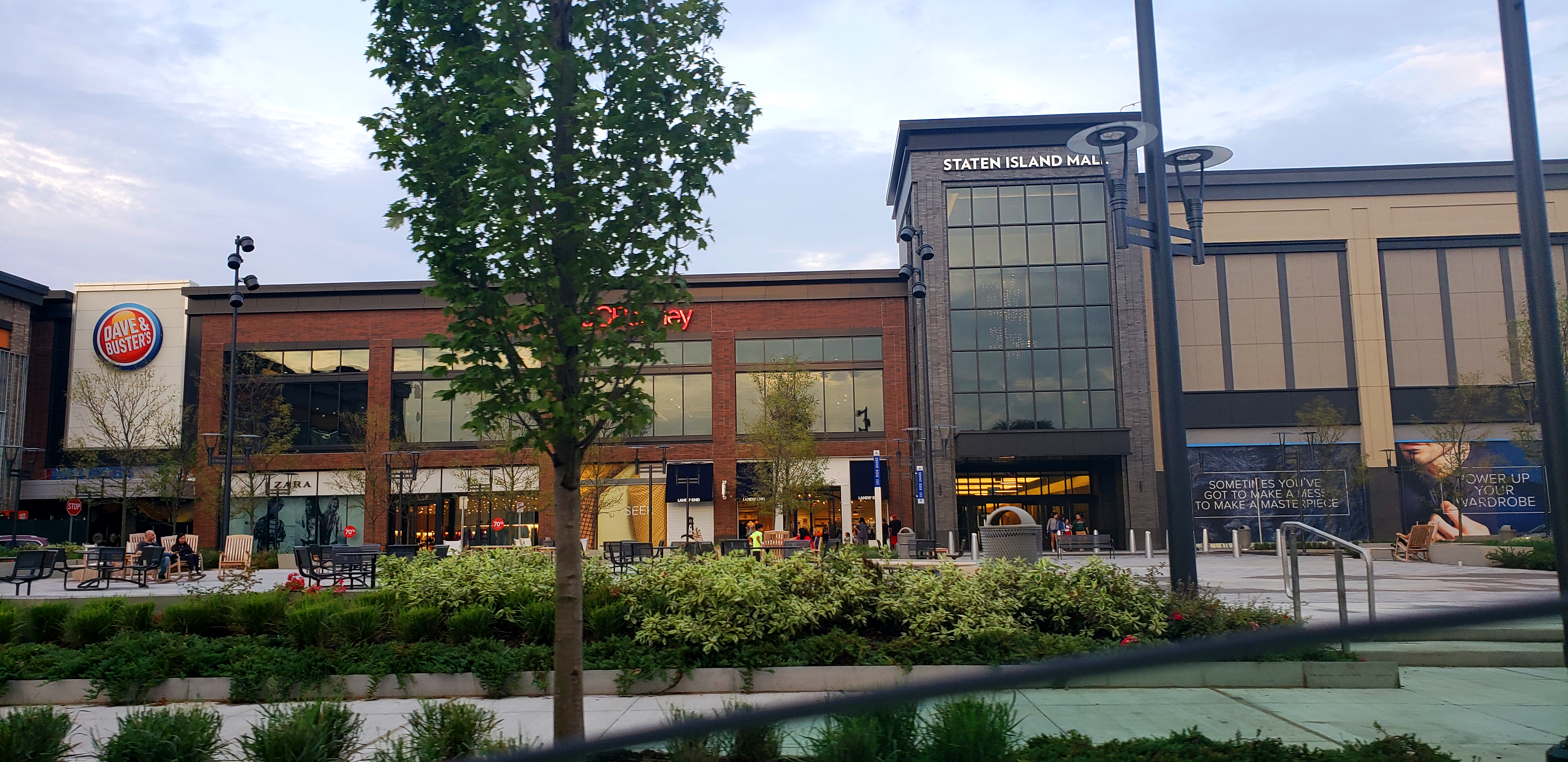
- The mall's new wing, public plaza, and front entrance as a result of the 2015-2019 expansion project
- Location: Staten Island, New York
- Opened: August 9, 1973; 53 years ago
- Renovated: 1993; 2015–2019
- Developer: Feist & Feist Realty Corporation (original); The Rouse Company (1990s renovation); General Growth Properties and Brookfield Properties (2010s renovation/expansion)
- Manager: GGP
- Owner: GGP
- Num. of stores: 220
- Num. of anchor tenants: 10
- Floor area: 1,370,000 square feet (127,000 m^{2})
- Floors: 2 (3 in Macy's)
- Public transit: New York City Transit Authority: S44, S94, S59, S89, S61, S91, S55, S56, S79, SIM4, SIM4C, SIM4X, SIM8, SIM8X, SIM31
- Website: www.statenislandmall.com

Staten Island Mall is a shopping mall in New Springville, Staten Island, New York City, opened in 1973. It is the only indoor shopping mall in the borough. It is the largest retail center on the island and is the site of the island's third-largest public transit hub after the St. George Terminal and Eltingville Transit Center, with numerous bus routes that connect to the periphery of the mall area. It is the second largest shopping center in New York City. The mall features Primark, JCPenney, Lidl, and Macy's, in addition to an 11-screen dine-in AMC Theatres.

== Description ==
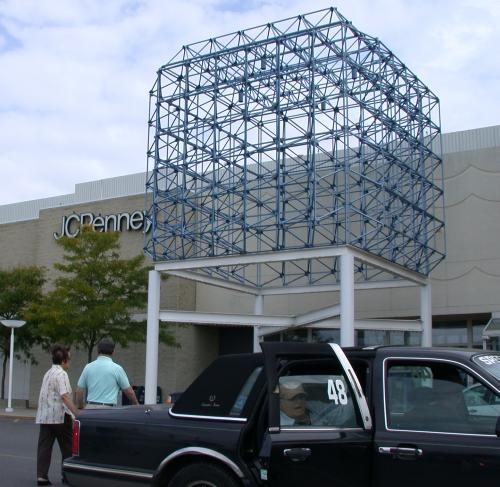
The main entrance to the Staten Island Mall in 2004.

The mall is owned by GGP of Chicago, Illinois, itself a subsidiary of Brookfield Properties, whose U.S. operations are based in New York. The mall has 200 stores employing approximately 3,000 people. Anchor tenants include JCPenney, Macy's, Lidl, and Primark. The Food District also has anchors of Dave and Buster's and an AMC Theatres dine-in cinema. A carnival by Reithoffer Shows was held from 1998 through 2018, bringing rides, games, and food stands into the parking lots of the mall. Amusements of America took the place of Reithoffer starting in 2019. The mall also has a strip mall called The Crossing, which features multiple shops and a restaurants.

== History ==
Prior to the construction of the mall, the land was occupied by the Staten Island Airport, which opened in 1941. The site was sold in 1955 with a shopping and amusement center envisaged, known as the Staten Island Center. In 1964 it was announced that Macy's and Abraham & Straus (A&S) would open stores across from E. J. Korvette. Construction of the mall commenced in 1970 and it opened on August 9, 1973, with Macy's and Sears. The A&S store was not built on the property as announced years earlier. The shopping center was developed by Feist and Feist Realty Corp. and sold to The Rouse Company in 1980. Rouse remodeled the mall by removing the small shops in the center court known as the "Honeycomb", adding escalators to the original six, and installing additional trees and several new fountains throughout the mall.

The mall was renovated and expanded in 1993 when the JCPenney wing was completed. JCPenney relocated to the mall from its longtime occupancy at the Forest Avenue Shoppers Town. The mall was originally a two-story building shaped like a letter "T", with a large outdoor plaza on the Richmond Avenue side, gross leasable area (GLA) of 1,274,000 square feet (118,400 m^{2}) and a tenant GLA of 622,000 square feet (57,800 m^{2}).

By the mid-2010, higher-end shops such as Michael Kors, Pandora, and Armani Exchange opened for business, and by 2011, numerous new brands (Adidas, Love Culture, etc.) were relocating or updating their looks while new tenants continued to revive the mall's image.

The mall was expanded by 242,000 square feet (22,500 m^{2}) between 2016 and 2019, which included the addition of a new retailers including Zara, Ulta Beauty, Dave & Buster's, Barnes & Noble, Lidl, and AMC Theatres. The food court was moved from its former area into the newly expanded area in the mall, renamed the "Food District". On March 15, 2017, Primark opened one of its first American locations. Sears closed, but The Container Store opened on an out parcel. A Krispy Kreme outparcel near the mall's main entrance, the first Krispy Kreme on the island was opened in 2022.

By 2023, Staten Island Mall had announced several additions, among them are Newbury Comics, Miniso, Charlotte Russe, Sugar Bear, Hobby Lobby, and Rainbow. In April 2024, Uniqlo, a Japanese retailer and manufacturer, announced that it would reopen in Staten Island after 10 years. That October, Brookfield Properties announced that it planned to add 41,000 square feet (3,800 m^{2}) to the mall.

== In media ==
Staten Island Mall was used as the music video filming location for the 1998 New Radicals song "You Get What You Give".

== Transportation ==
Several local, select and express New York City Transit Authority buses stop and either travel through or on the perimeter (where park and ride facilities exist) of the mall's campus. They include the S44, S94, S59, S89, S61 and S91 local buses/limited counterparts, the S55 and S56 buses with no corresponding limited buses, the S79 Select Bus Service route, and the SIM4, SIM4C, SIM4X, SIM8, SIM8X and SIM31 express buses.
