= Charleston, Staten Island =

Neighborhood in New York City

Coordinates: 40°32′13″N 74°14′14″W

Kreischerville map, 1913

Charleston is a neighborhood, or section, of New York City's borough of Staten Island. It is located on the island's South Shore, with Tottenville to the south, Pleasant Plains to the East, Rossville to the north, and the Arthur Kill to the west. The neighborhood is represented in the New York City Council by Joe Borelli and in the New York State Senate by Andrew Lanza.

== History ==
Charleston, once a small village settled by the Androvette farming family in 1699, bore their name as Androvetteville or Androvettetown through the 18th century. In approximately 1850, eight of the twenty-nine structures in the village belonged to the Androvette family.

Some longtime locals remember Charleston as Kreischerville. With the arrival of Balthasar Kreischer (1813–1886), a Bavarian immigrant and founder of the Kreischer Brick Manufactory, the area became known as Kreischerville as his business success supported the surrounding area. Balthasar Kreischer had three mansions built on Kreischer Hill, one of which still stands and is designated a historical landmark. This surviving Kreischer House, at 4500 Arthur Kill Road at the intersection of Kreischer Street, was renovated by the Staten Island Land Development LLC. The mansion has a certificate of occupancy for a 70-seat restaurant that will operate at night. The factory, built in 1854, was destroyed by fire in 1877 and rebuilt. The factory finally shut its doors in 1927.

The name Charleston seems to have arisen during World War I, when anti-German sentiment flourished as the United States entered the war. "Charleston" appears to have been chosen so as to name the village after Charles Kreischer, one of Balthasar Kreischer's sons.

Charleston once had its own United States Post Office branch, and mail sent there bore the postal code "Staten Island 13, New York". The post office, located at 28 Androvette Street, was closed in 1949. While neighborhoods on Staten Island do not have universally agreed-upon boundaries, most observers today reckon Charleston as consisting of a triangle-shaped territory enclosed by Bloomingdale Road, the Richmond Parkway, and the Arthur Kill; this gives Charleston a slightly larger area than that which the former post office served. By the current wider definition, Charleston includes portions of Sandy Ground, settled in 1828 by African Americans who had achieved freedom from slavery, most of whom came to the area from Maryland. Remnants of the original settlement still exist.

== Development ==
Charleston is one of the most remote and sparsely populated areas within all of New York City. In addition to the Kreischer mansion and Sandy Ground, the neighborhood is also home to the Clay Pit Ponds State Park Preserve and the Arthur Kill Correctional Facility, a closed state prison property. Even today many Charleston residents still keep horses on their property.

Recent development in the area has spawned a new shopping corridor along Veterans Road West, including Staten Island's first Target and third Home Depot, among many other stores located in Bricktown Centre at Charleston, an open-air lifestyle center. A second shopping center is located along Veterans Road West. Development in that part of Charleston has continued.

The Tides at Charleston, an adult community development of approximately 120 units, broke ground in Summer 2007, with units available for occupancy as of early 2008. A Kresicherville Active Adult community is slated to cost $25 million and will preserve the Kreischer mansion as a central landmark for the development.

In June 2016, a Shoprite opened on Veterans Road. It is the only supermarket located in Charleston as of 2020.

In September 2017, developers announced the construction of Riverside Galleria, a 600,000-square-foot (56,000 m^{2}) shopping mall in the southern part of Charleston designed by Studio V Architecture. The mall would include amenities such as a waterfront park, elevated walkways, and green roofs, as well as a variety of shops that included restaurants, a "dine-in cinema", and a supermarket. However, plans for the mall were canceled in January 2019 due to community opposition.

On March 17, 2022, the New York Public Library opened its first net-zero energy library in New York City, located in the Bricktown Commons shopping center on the South Shore. Designed by Ikon 5 Architects, nearly 100 percent of the building's energy will be derived from solar panels. The Charleston Library features "dedicated spaces for adults, teens, and children and flexible multi-purpose rooms for programs and classes."

== Transportation ==
MTA Regional Bus Operations' Charleston Depot, off Arthur Kill Road, opened in January 2011. Charleston is served by the S74, S84 and S78 local buses along Arthur Kill Road, all of which terminate at Bricktown Mall. Charleston is also served by the S55 local bus on Bloomingdale Road. The SIM26, an express bus to Manhattan, also runs along Bloomingdale Road. New York State Route 440 and Korean War Veterans Parkway pass through Charleston.

== Cityscape ==
In 2002, Allen Alishahi, a broker at Sun Properties of New York Inc., estimated that one third of Charleston was residential, one third had commercial and industrial properties, and one third was parkland. The majority of houses were single-family homes, including ranch houses, Victorian houses, detached Colonial houses, and French mansard houses. A significant number of houses in Charleston date from the early 1900s. Newer homes tend to be semi-detached houses grouped in enclaves, or large custom detached houses.

== Demographics ==
For census purposes, the New York City Department of City Planning classifies Charlestown as part of a larger Neighborhood Tabulation Area called Tottenville-Charleston SI0305. This neighborhood had 16,089 inhabitants based on data from the 2020 United States Census. This was an decrease of 771 persons (-4.6%) from the 16,860 counted in 2010. The neighborhood had a population density of 5.8 inhabitants per acre (14,500/sq mi; 5,600/km2).

The racial makeup of the neighborhood was 82.0% (13,186) White (Non-Hispanic), 0.8% (136) Black (Non-Hispanic), 2.7% (439) Asian, 0.7% (109) from some other race, and 2.0% (328) from two or more races. Hispanic or Latino of any race were 11.8% (1,891) of the population.

According to the 2020 United States Census, this area has many cultural communities of over 1,000 inhabitants. These groups are residents who identify as German, Irish, and Italian.

Most inhabitants are higher-aged adults: 29.9% are between 49-64 years old. 71.0% of the households had at least one family present. Out of the 5,818 households, 54.8% had a married couple (22.9% with a child under 18), 4.0% had a cohabiting couple (1.3% with a child under 18), 16.1% had a single male (0.9% with a child under 18), and 25.1% had a single female (3.5% with a child under 18). 31.7% of households had children. In this neighborhood, 29.4% of non-vacant housing units are renter-occupied.

The entirety of Community District 3, which comprises Tottenville and other South Shore neighborhoods, had 159,132 inhabitants as of NYC Health's 2018 Community Health Profile, with an average life expectancy of 81.3 years. This is about the same as the median life expectancy of 81.2 for all New York City neighborhoods. Most inhabitants are youth and middle-aged adults: 21% are between the ages of between 0–17, 26% between 25 and 44, and 29% between 45 and 64. The ratio of college-aged and elderly residents was lower, at 8% and 16% respectively.

As of 2017, the median household income in Community District 3 was $96,796, though the median income in Tottenville individually was $81,478. In 2018, an estimated 11% of Tottenville and the South Shore residents lived in poverty, compared to 17% in all of Staten Island and 20% in all of New York City. One in sixteen residents (6%) were unemployed, compared to 6% in Staten Island and 9% in New York City. Rent burden, or the percentage of residents who have difficulty paying their rent, is 42% in Tottenville and the South Shore, compared to the boroughwide and citywide rates of 49% and 51% respectively. Based on this calculation, as of 2018, Tottenville and the South Shore are considered high-income relative to the rest of the city and not gentrifying.

== Crime ==
Despite having a very low crime rate along with the rest of the South Shore, Charleston was nonetheless home to two notable crime-related figures, one a perpetrator and the other a victim. Serial killer Richard Biegenwald, who murdered at least six people during 1958–1983, was born and raised there. In 1990, the neighborhood attracted more media attention when an anti-gay hate crime was committed there: James Zappalorti, a 45-year-old disabled veteran of the Vietnam War, was stabbed to death by two assailants, one of whom also resided in Charleston at the time. The Zappalorti murder sparked New York State to adopt enhanced penalties for crimes motivated by bias.

== Education ==
The New York City Department of Education serves Charleston. As of 2002, the majority of Charleston elementary-school students attend P.S. 56; others attend P.S. 6 or P.S. 62. For grades six through eight, the majority attend Totten Intermediate School (I.S. 34) or Paulo Intermediate School (I.S. 75). Tottenville High School is the area high school.

The sole school facility within Charleston itself is an annex to P.S./I.S. 25R South Richmond High School, a special education school with its main campus in Pleasant Plains. The annex was previously P.S. 4, a stand-alone school.
