= Arthur Kill Road =

Avenue in Staten Island, New York

Coordinates: 40°33′21.16″N 74°12′8″W

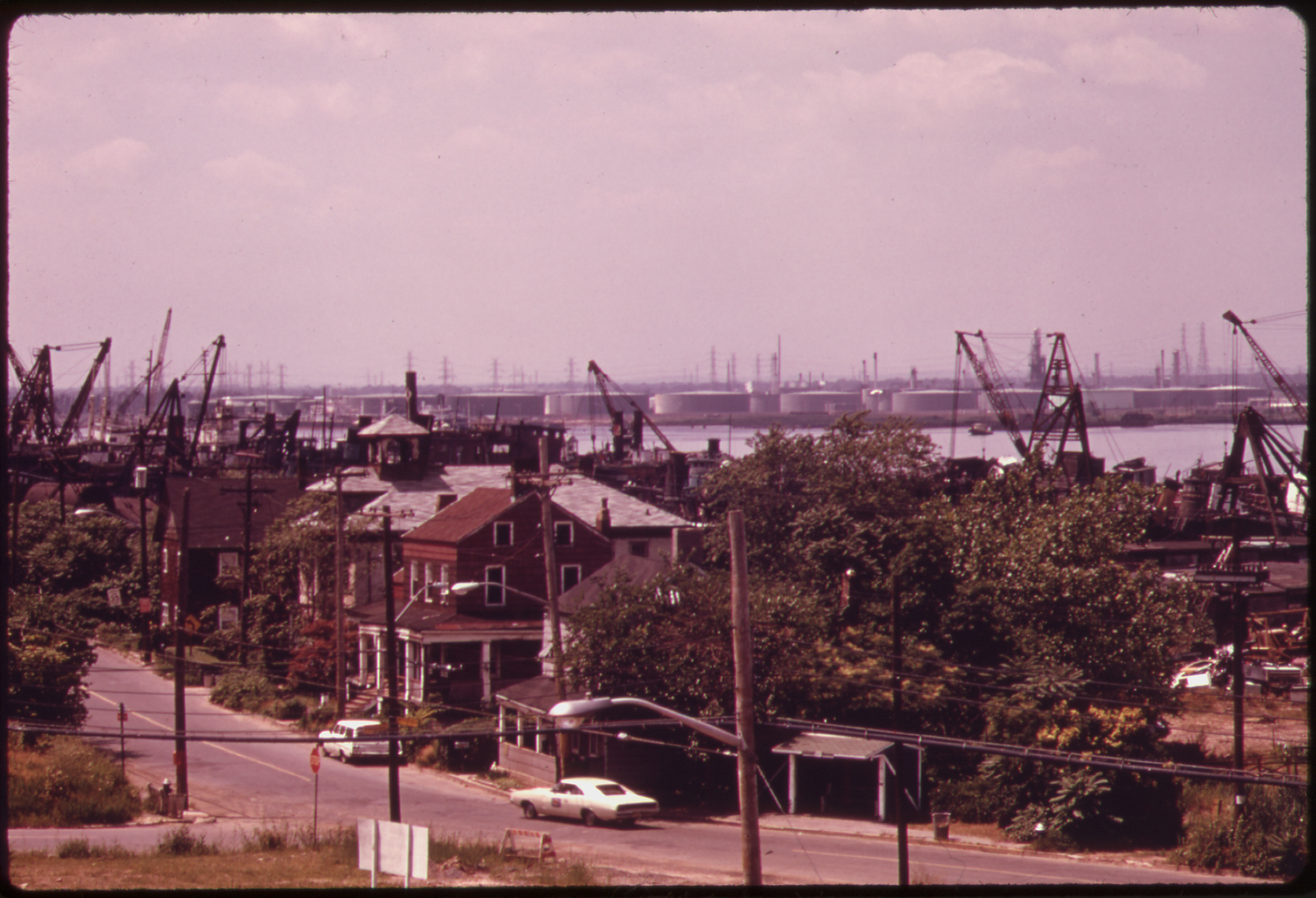
- Looking south in 1973, with Arthur Kill and the New Jersey shore in the background
- Former names: Fresh Kills Road, Shore Road, Riverside Avenue
- Namesake: Arthur Kill
- Owner: City of New York
- Maintained by: NYCDOT
- Length: 8.54 mi (13.74 km)
- Location: Staten Island, New York
- South end: Dead end in Tottenville
- Major junctions: NY 440 in Rossville
- North end: Richmond Road / Richmond Hill Road in Richmondtown

Arthur Kill Road is a major northeast-southwest artery along the South-West Shore of the New York City borough of Staten Island. It is 8.54 miles (13.74 km) long, and runs through the neighborhoods of Tottenville, Richmond Valley, Charleston, Rossville, Woodrow, Huguenot, Arden Heights, Annadale, Eltingville, Greenridge, Great Kills, and Richmondtown.

Arthur Kill Road is named for the waterway to its west, the Arthur Kill, which separates Staten Island from Union County and Middlesex County, New Jersey. It was known by other names in the 19th century, including Fresh Kills Road, Shore Road and Riverside Avenue.

Landmarks include the Blazing Star Burial Ground, the Arthur Kill Correctional Facility, the unused LNG tanks east of Chemical Lane, the Kreischer House as well as the Outerbridge Crossing which Arthur Kill Road passes underneath.

== Transportation ==
Local service is provided by the following:

- The S74 and S84 are the primary routes of Arthur Kill Road, serving it east of Veterans Road West, near Bricktown Mall. There is no service between Bloomingdale Road and Rossville Avenue.
- All S78 buses that run the full route serve between the Veterans Road West for Bricktown Mall, and either Main Street (St. George Ferry) or Johnson Avenue (mall).
- Additional weekday service is provided by the following:
  - The S54 runs east of Giffords Lane.
  - West of Richmond Avenue, the S55 runs to Annadale Road, and the S56 runs to Arden Avenue.

Express service is provided by the following:

- The SIM2 and SIM22 run to Arden Avenue, the SIM23 runs to Richmond Avenue and heads south, the SIM24 runs non-stop to Huguenot Avenue, and the SIM25 runs to Rossville Avenue.
- The Manhattan-bound SIM4 runs non-stop from Annadale Road to Richmond Avenue, heading north. Buses labeled “SIM4c” are extended in both directions to Arden Avenue, west of Annadale.
- The SIM8 runs non-stop between Richmond Avenue and Woodrow Road.
- The SIM15 serves Arthur Kill east of the Eltingville Transit Center, running with the non-stop SIM5 and SIM6 until Armstrong Avenue.

Train service is provided by the following:

- The Staten Island Railway (SIR) runs adjacent to Arthur Kill Road from Arthur Kill to Tottenville.

== Major intersections ==
The entire route is in the New York City borough of Staten Island.

Location	mi	km	Destinations	Notes
Tottenville	0.00	0.00	Dead end	Southern terminus
Charleston	1.3	2.1	To NY 440 north (Korean War Veterans Parkway) – West Shore Expressway	Access via Bridge Street
Charleston	1.6	2.6	To NY 440 south (Outerbridge Crossing)	Access via Veterans Road West
Rossville	3.8	6.1	NY 440 (West Shore Expressway) – Outerbridge Crossing	Exit 4 on NY 440
Arden Heights	6.87	11.06	To Korean War Veterans Parkway south – Outerbridge Crossing	Access via Drumgoole Road West
Arden Heights–Eltingville line	6.92	11.14	Richmond Avenue	
Richmondtown	8.54	13.74	Richmond Road / Richmond Hill Road	Northern terminus
1.000 mi = 1.609 km; 1.000 km = 0.621 mi
