= Greenridge, Staten Island =

Neighborhood in New York City

Coordinates: 40°33′40″N 74°10′11″W

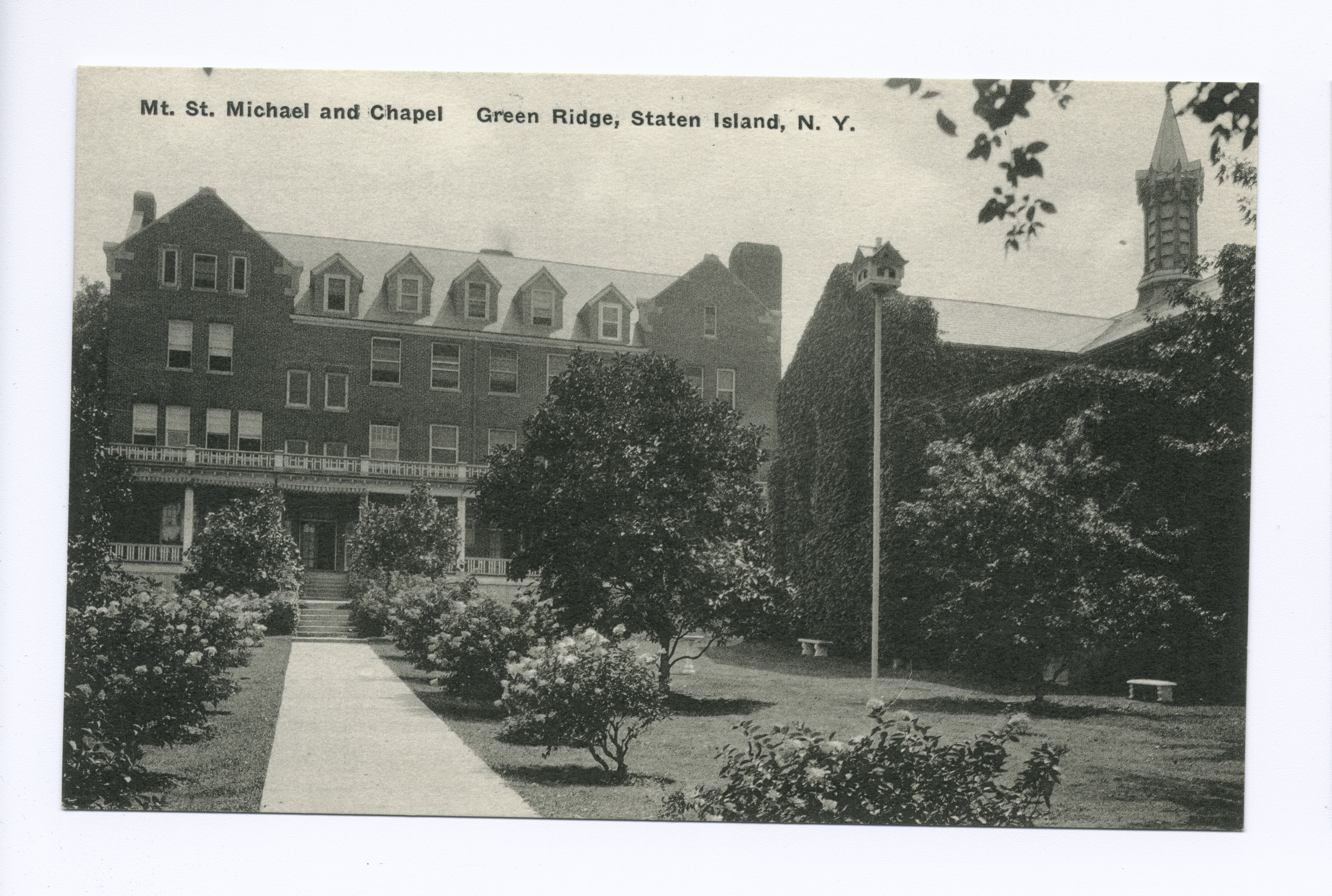
Mt. St. Michael orphanage and Chapel on Arthur Kill Road, early 20th century

Greenridge or Marshland is a name sometimes used to denote the western part of Eltingville, a neighborhood on Staten Island's South Shore.

The area's earliest settlers were French Huguenots, who are also responsible for a nearby South Shore neighborhood being named Huguenot. The Dutch called it Kleine Kill, or Little Creek, and the British called it Fresh Kills, into which Richmond Creek, which forms its western boundary, empties. The area appears to have received its present name (sometimes spelled Green Ridge) about 1876.

In 1921, a highly popular restaurant and amusement place resembling today's Chuck E. Cheese's opened at the northwest corner of Arthur Kill Road and Richmond Avenue. Known as Al Deppe's, it was forced out of business in the late 1960s when its property was condemned to make way for the proposed Richmond Parkway. However, due to intense opposition — much of it from environmental activists — the parkway section that would have passed over Deppe's location was never built. Only the section south and west of this point was constructed. It opened in the autumn of 1972, overlaying a pre-existing thoroughfare named Drumgoole Boulevard, in honor of the Roman Catholic priest John C. Drumgoole who founded an orphanage in Pleasant Plains.

Greenridge has seen much development — a great deal of it commercial — in recent decades, including the construction of a public transit center, the Eltingville Transit Center, in the early 2000s. Many passengers wait there each weekday morning for express buses that take them to their jobs in downtown or Midtown Manhattan.
