= Murder of James Zappalorti =

Disabled Vietnam War veteran (1945–1990)

James "Jimmy" Patrick Zappalorti (September 29, 1945 – January 22, 1990), a disabled veteran of the Vietnam War, was the victim of a highly publicized, fatal gay-bashing attack on Staten Island, New York. The murder led to increased efforts to pass a statewide hate crime law, which was ultimately enacted in 2000.

== Biography ==
Born in Brooklyn, Zappalorti moved to Staten Island in 1950, his family settling in the Charleston neighborhood. The family ran a stained-glass business whose clients included approximately 30 churches on the island and others as far away as the West Coast and Canada.

After attending Our Lady Help of Christians School in Tottenville, Zappalorti attended Tottenville High School, but dropped out before graduating in order to enlist in the United States Navy on November 27, 1962. His mother signed the parental consent form (necessary because he was not yet 18 years old), after his father refused to do so.

Zappalorti served as a seaman aboard the USS Henrico, which saw action in the Vietnam War. He was placed on disabled status and honorably discharged on April 5, 1965, after a nervous breakdown from a traumatic incident in which he was assaulted by some shipmates and his partner was killed.

== Murder ==
Upon his return to Staten Island, Zappalorti did not hold down a formal job but was frequently seen in the neighborhood planting trees and clearing away debris. His life came to an abrupt end on the evening of January 22, 1990, after Zappalorti bought beer and invited a neighborhood resident and his companion to a small hut he had built on the beach beyond the woods across the street from his family's home. Once there, the duo demanded Zappalorti's wallet. After he tossed it away, the neighbor, Michael Taylor, 20 years old, pulled out a hunting knife and stabbed him three times in the chest and abdomen, causing his death. The duo then attempted to rob Zappalorti's house using his keys, but were discovered by his mother. Zappalorti's brother, Michael Zappalorti Jr., discovered the body the following day. A subsequent autopsy showed four stab wounds, and authorities speculate that the fourth wound was inflicted by Taylor's accomplice, identified as 26-year-old Phillip Sarlo.

Taylor was taken into custody at 2:30 A.M. on January 24 as he stepped outside a bar in the South Beach section of Staten Island, but Sarlo fled the area and was not apprehended until February 18, after he was found in Ocala, Florida. Gay rights activists asked New York State Governor Mario Cuomo to appoint a special prosecutor to the case, citing the fact that Staten Island District Attorney William L. Murphy had been the only one of the city's five district attorneys to oppose the city's anti-gay-discrimination law when it was passed in 1986. Also, in that same year, Murphy had prosecuted a carjacking case that resulted in Taylor, then 16 years old, being adjudicated a juvenile offender when he could have been tried as an adult, and Sarlo receiving a sentence of 1½ to 4½ years, the minimum then possible on the charges for which he had been indicted.

In both the 1986 carjacking case and the Zappalorti murder, Taylor, in statements he made to the police, cited animosity toward homosexuals as a motive for the crime. (The victim in the 1986 case was attacked near a boardwalk in the South Beach area reportedly frequented by homosexuals, and Zappalorti's sexual orientation was common knowledge in the neighborhood where both he and Taylor resided.) Sarlo, however, denied harboring such sentiments.

== Verdict ==
The Zappalorti case never went to trial, because on December 5, 1990, after extensive "plea-bargaining" negotiations, both Taylor and Sarlo plead guilty to charges of second-degree murder. (In New York State at the time, first-degree murder applied only if the victim was a law-enforcement officer or the killer was already serving a life sentence for a previous murder.) It is reported that the district attorney's office was reluctant to go to trial because of fears the defendants might have attempted to use the gay panic defense, and may have garnered considerable sympathy from a potential jury in culturally conservative, heavily Roman Catholic Staten Island.

Pursuant to the plea agreement, Taylor received a prison sentence of 23 years to life while Sarlo was sentenced to 18 years to life. On May 30, 1997, Sarlo killed himself at the maximum-security Wende Correctional Facility outside Buffalo. Taylor was also incarcerated at a maximum-security institution, and was denied parole in 2012, 2014, 2016, 2018, and 2020.

== Aftermath ==
The 1990 murder of James Zappalorti was recognized as the first anti-gay hate crime in New York City since police began categorizing such crimes in 1980. One of Zappalorti's nephews was hospitalized for his own gay-bashing in 1993 at age 22, in nearby Rossville, Staten Island. The murder and subsequent attacks led to increased efforts to pass a statewide hate crime law, which was supported by Mayor David Dinkins and John Cardinal O'Connor and ultimately enacted in 2000. On May 29, 2015, a street in Charleston, Staten Island, was renamed in honor of Zappalorti.

== See also ==
- History of violence against LGBT people in the United States
