= South Richmond =

South Richmond may refer to:

- Delta—South Richmond, a former federal electoral district in British Columbia, Canada
- South Richmond High School, a high school in Staten Island, New York
- South Richmond, Virginia, part of the city of Richmond
- South Richmond (ward), London, UK
