= Korean War Veterans Parkway =

Parkway in Staten Island, New York

Korean War Veterans Parkway
- Korean War Veterans Parkway highlighted in red

Route information
- Maintained by NYSDOT
- Length: 4.28 mi (6.89 km)
- Existed: 1972–present
- History: Named Richmond Parkway from 1972–1997
- Component highways: NY 909C (unsigned) entire length NY 440 in Charleston
- Restrictions: No commercial vehicles north of Maguire Avenue

Major junctions
- South end: NY 440 in Charleston
- NY 440 in Charleston
- North end: Drumgoole Road West in Arden Heights

Location
- Country: United States
- State: New York
- Counties: Richmond

Highway system
- New York Highways; Interstate; US; State; Reference; Parkways

The Korean War Veterans Parkway is a controlled-access parkway that traverses the South Shore of Staten Island, New York, in the United States. It begins at the Outerbridge Crossing toll gantry and runs from southwest to northeast to a merge with Drumgoole Road West in the island's Arden Heights section. The parkway is designated New York State Route 909C (NY 909C), an unsigned reference route, which continues northeast along Drumgoole Road West for a short distance to its end at an intersection with Richmond Avenue. The westernmost 0.38 miles (0.61 km) of the parkway overlaps with NY 440.

The parkway opened in 1972 as the Richmond Parkway. It was renamed the Korean War Veterans Parkway in 1997; however, the highway is still widely known as the Richmond Parkway.

As originally planned, the parkway would have continued northeast to an interchange with Interstate 278 (I-278) in Sunnyside, and would have also connected to Wolfe's Pond Park on Staten Island's South Shore by way of a spur known as Wolfe's Pond Parkway. The section of the Richmond Parkway east of Richmond Avenue was canceled sometime after the 1960s as a result of community opposition; likewise, Wolfe's Pond Parkway was canceled in the 1970s. Today, the part of the Staten Island Greenbelt where the parkway would have run is still known as Richmond Parkway.

== Route description ==
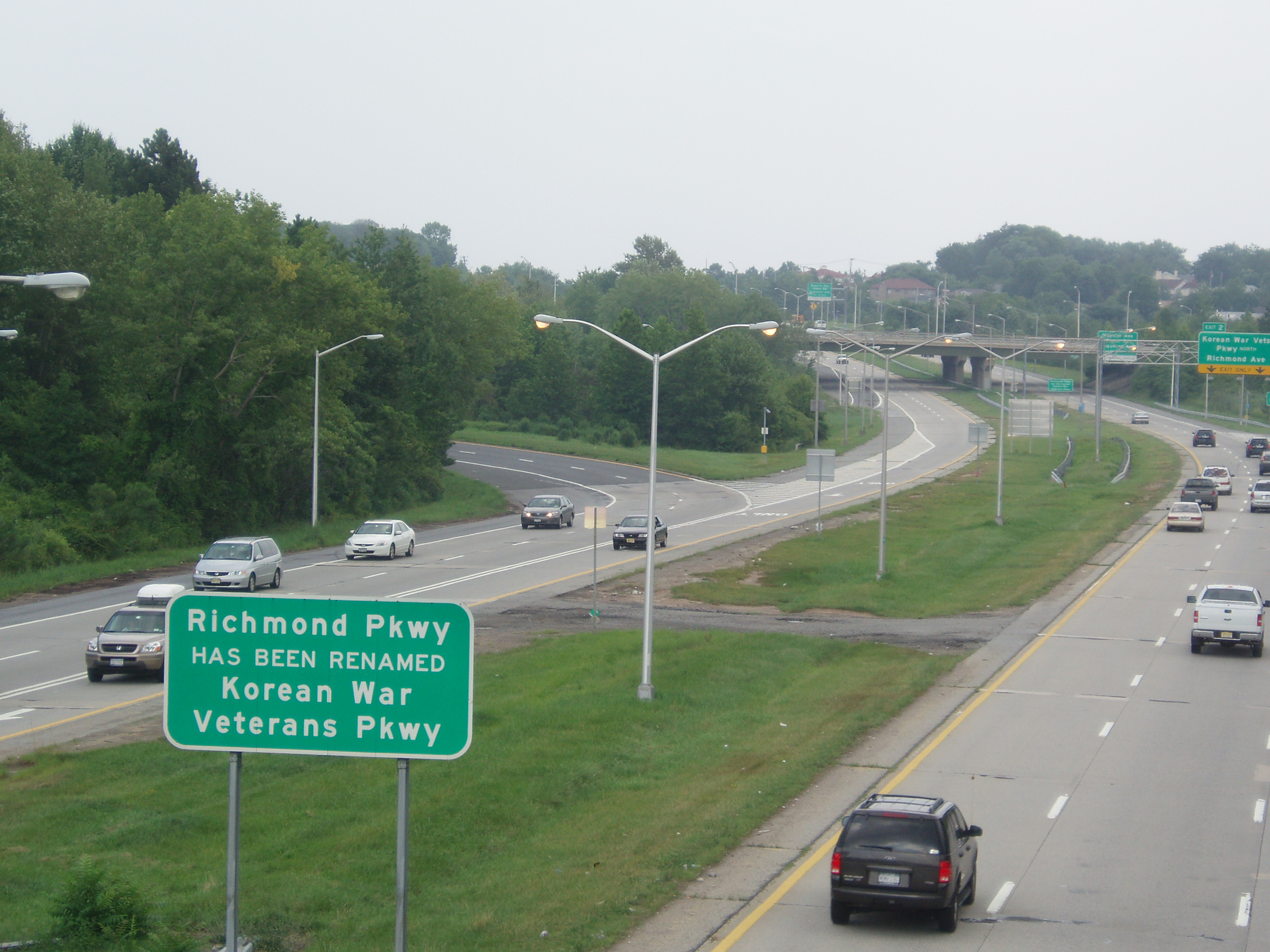
The Korean War Veterans Parkway, facing northeast from Tyrellan Avenue

The Korean War Veterans Parkway begins concurrent with NY 440 at the Outerbridge Crossing toll gantry east of the New Jersey state line on Staten Island. NY 440 and the parkway remain overlapped in Charleston to exit 2, where NY 440 splits from the parkway and heads north on the West Shore Expressway. Past NY 440, the four-lane parkway heads northeast, gaining frontage roads as Drumgoole Road begins to run along both sides of the highway. Not far to the east, the parkway runs along the southern edge of Bloomingdale Park and connects to Maguire Avenue by way of ramps leading to and from Drumgoole Road. The parkway continues slightly northeastward along the Prince's Bay–Woodrow line, serving Huguenot Avenue with southbound exit and northbound entrance ramps.

From Huguenot Avenue, the highway takes a more pronounced northeasterly track through the neighborhood of Woodrow, meeting Arden Avenue by way of an interchange in the latter community. The parkway continues as a four-lane freeway to Arden Heights, where the road merges with the northern half of Drumgoole Road to create a four-lane, two-way surface street with a Jersey barrier in the median. The Korean War Veterans Parkway ends at the merge; however, NY 909C, the unsigned reference route designation for the parkway, continues to follow Drumgoole Road to its end a short distance later at an intersection with Richmond Avenue. Stubs intended to continue both directions of the parkway past Greenridge are present at the merge with Drumgoole Road. The unused highways roughly parallel Drumgoole Road, crossing over Richmond Avenue before abruptly becoming a small two-lane road just east of the overpasses. The road continues as a non-public asphalt roadway used for construction vehicles.

== History ==
Unbuilt portion of the Richmond Parkway

The parkway that exists today represents less than half of the highway that was originally planned. From Richmond Avenue, the parkway would have continued northeast to Staten Island's Sunnyside neighborhood, where it would connect to the Staten Island Expressway. The 4.5-mile (7.2 km) section west of Richmond Avenue was constructed along Drumgoole Road from 1966 to 1972 and opened to traffic in late 1972. As a result, the parkway's one-way service roads were named Drumgoole Road East and Drumgoole Road West. Drumgoole Road itself was named for Father John Drumgoole, the Irish-born founder of the Mission of the Immaculate Virgin, a Roman Catholic orphanage better known today as Mount Loretto.

In the late 1960s, intense community opposition erupted over the portion east of Richmond Avenue—much of it from environmentalists—because the parkway's planned route would have bisected the Staten Island Greenbelt and would have required the condemnation and razing of miles of private property. The 4.8-mile (7.7 km) section of the parkway between Richmond Avenue and the proposed Staten Island Expressway interchange ended up never being built, and the route was subsequently demapped. From time to time, proposals have been made to revive the aborted section of the parkway in response to steadily increasing traffic congestion on Staten Island. However, none of these proposals have received significant support from the island's elected officials or residents.

Robert Moses had an interchange built at the junction with the Staten Island Expressway (I-278) in Todt Hill, with the intention of using it for the terminus of the Richmond Parkway. However, this never came to be finished and the interchange was demolished in 2012 as part of a project to widen the Staten Island Expressway.

Wolfe's Pond Parkway, a spur route connecting Richmond Parkway to Wolfe's Pond Park on Staten Island's South Shore, was proposed by Robert Moses in 1941. The highway never advanced past the planning stage, and it was ultimately cancelled in the 1970s.

In 1997, the Richmond Parkway was renamed the Korean War Veterans Memorial Parkway; however, when signs announcing the change were erected, the word "Memorial" was inadvertently omitted.

== Exit list ==
The entire route is in the New York City borough of Staten Island.

Location	mi	km	Exit	Destinations	Notes
Charleston	0.00	0.00	–	NY 440 south (Outerbridge Crossing) – New Jersey	Continuation south; southern end of NY 440 concurrency
Charleston	0.00	0.00	1	To Arthur Kill Road	Southbound entrance only; access via Veterans Road West
Charleston	0.00	0.00	1	Page Avenue to Hylan Boulevard	Northbound exit and entrance; access via Boscombe Avenue
Charleston	0.20– 0.38	0.32– 0.61	–	Park & Ride	No southbound entrance
Charleston	0.20– 0.38	0.32– 0.61	2	NY 440 north (West Shore Expressway) to I-278 (Staten Island Expressway)	Northern end of NY 440 concurrency; I-278 not signed southbound; exit number not signed southbound
Prince's Bay–Woodrow line	0.79	1.27	–	Maguire Avenue to Foster Road / Huguenot Avenue	Northbound exit and southbound entrance; all trucks must exit
Prince's Bay–Woodrow line			–	Wolfe's Pond Parkway / Wolfe's Pond Park	Formerly proposed trumpet interchange
Prince's Bay–Woodrow line	0.98	1.58	–	Maguire Avenue to Bloomingdale Road / Arthur Kill Road	Southbound exit and northbound entrance
Prince's Bay–Woodrow line	2.1	3.4	–	Huguenot Avenue to Foster Road	Southbound exit and northbound entrance
Woodrow	3.10	4.99	–	Arden Avenue to Albee Avenue / Annadale Road	Signed for Albee Avenue southbound, Annadale Road northbound
Arden Heights	4.00	6.44	–	To Richmond Avenue south	Northbound exit only; access via Drumgoole Road East
Arden Heights	4.28	6.89	–	To Richmond Avenue north	Northern terminus; at-grade intersection; access via Drumgoole Road West
1.000 mi = 1.609 km; 1.000 km = 0.621 mi: Incomplete access; Proposed
