= USS PC-1217 =

1943 PC-461-class submarine chaser

History

United States
- Name: USS PC-1217
- Builder: Luders Marine Construction Co., Stamford, Connecticut
- Laid down: 26 May 1943
- Launched: 26 September 1943
- Commissioned: 27 April 1944
- Fate: Sold for scrap, 1948

General characteristics
- Class & type: PC-461-class submarine chaser
- Displacement: 280 Tons light; 450 Tons full
- Length: 173 ft 8 in (52.93 m)
- Beam: 23 ft (7.0 m)
- Draft: 10 ft 10 in (3.30 m)
- Propulsion: 2 × Hooven-Owens-Rentschler RB-99DA diesel engines (Serial No. 7317 & 7318), two shafts
- Speed: 22 knots (41 km/h)
- Complement: 65
- Armament: 1 × 3"/50 gun, 1 × 40 mm gun, 2 × 20 mm guns; 4 × depth charge projectors, 2 × depth charge tracks, 2 × rocket launchers

USS PC-1217 was a PC-461-class submarine chaser built for the United States Navy during World War II. PC-1217 had been decommissioned by 1948, and although sold for scrapping at that time, she remains at the former Donjon Marine Yard in Rossville, Staten Island.

== Career ==
PC-1217 was laid down on 26 May 1943 by the Luders Marine Construction Co. of Stamford, Connecticut. She was launched on 26 September 1943, and commissioned on 27 April 1944 with Lieutenant Burt D. Reedy commanding and Lt(jg) Robert S. Bolles Exec. Lt(jg) Louis B. Pieper #3, Ensigns: William C. Graham and Robert K. McConnell.

PC-1217's shakedown cruise was out of Stamford, and then the U.S. Naval Frontier Base, Tompkinsville, Staten Island along the Atlantic coast. The ship's crew attended SCTC in Miami, Florida from 1 February 1944 through 20 April 1944. The crew traveled north by rail to Stamford, and moved aboard the ship on 22 April 1944. During the late spring and summer of 1944, the 1217 (call sign NQXG) was assigned to convoy escort, anti-buzz-bomb and anti-submarine patrol duty with the Eastern Sea Frontier (the east coast from Canada down to Cuba). The 1217 made numerous voyages escorting convoys from New York City to Guantanamo Bay Naval Base, Cuba and from Argentia, Newfoundland to New York City.

PC-1217 was on convoy duty escorting convoy NG 458 to Guantanamo Bay when it encountered the Great Atlantic Hurricane of 1944 on 12–14 September. This was one of the largest Atlantic hurricanes ever recorded (Category 4) with estimated 140 mph (220 km/h) winds and a barometric low pressure of 27.75" (705 mmHg). The storm had a devastating effect on ships in its path; five U.S. Navy ships were sunk and 344 sailors were killed in the storm. PC-1217 was severely damaged and put into Jacksonville, Florida for emergency repairs.

Successfully repaired, PC-1217 remained in service through World War II. She was sold to the Maritime Commission in early 1948.

The remains of PC-1217 are at a marine scrapyard at Rossville, Staten Island in New York.
