= Sandy Ground Historical Museum =

Museum in Staten Island, New York

Coordinates: 40.540982°N 74.216508°W

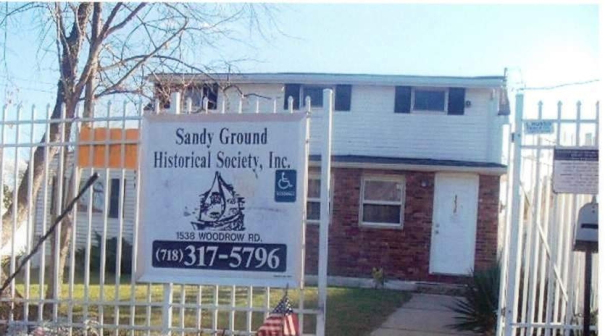
- Location: 1538 Woodrow Rd; Staten Island, New York City
- Website: https://www.nyc-arts.org/organizations/341/sandy-ground-historical-society

The Sandy Ground Historical Museum, located within the Sandy Ground community of Rossville in Staten Island, New York City, is dedicated to the oldest continuously inhabited free black settlement in the United States. The museum is home to the largest documentary collection of Staten Island's African-American culture and history and it may also be home to the only intact 18th -century African cemetery in America. As of February 2023, it is temporarily closed due to maintenance and operational issues . The Historical Society has plans to complete a restoration, expand their oral history projects, and develop new exhibits in 2026.

The museum is operated by the Sandy Ground Historical Society and its annual festival is a celebration of black history, culture and freedom. The museum is also chartered by the New York State Department of Education to bring education and awareness of Sandy Ground to adults and children alike through guided tours, exhibits, interactive activities including arts and crafts, and lectures. Sandy Ground reaches about 10,000 people a year in these education initiatives (about 4,000 children and about 6,000 adults.) The museum also preserves artifacts from the early years of the town such as art, quilts, letters, photographs, film and rare books.

== Town history ==
Within Rossville is Sandy Ground, among the oldest surviving communities in the United States, which was founded by free African Americans prior to the American Civil War, with the first documented land purchase by an African American named Captain John Jackson on February 23, 1828, just months after the abolition of slavery in New York. Sandy Ground was originally called Harrisville, soon being changed to Little Africa before receiving its current name of Sandy Ground for the infertility of the land Several of the community's historic structures are still extant, including five that have been designated as New York City landmarks, including a church, a cemetery, and three homes. Some residents also live in the original community.

After slavery in New York was abolished in 1827, freedmen settled in the area known since colonial times as Sandy Ground, which was located in the area around what is now the intersection of Bloomingdale and Woodrow Roads in Rossville. These early settlers were skilled in the oyster trade, and brought this knowledge with them to Staten Island. MAAP (Mapping the African American Past ) talks about the link from the Maryland Oyster Workers in the 1800s and Sandy Ground. Oyster harvesting Staten Island was mainly conducted on the island's south shore. Prince's Bay was the main hub and was within walking distance from Sandy Ground. Sandy Ground also served as an important stop on the Underground Railroad, and is the oldest continuously settled free black community in the United States. Oyster farming ended around 1916 due to water pollution in the harbor.

The records of the Sandy Ground African Methodist Church go back to 1850.

== See also ==
- List of museums focused on African Americans
- List of historical societies in New York (state)
