= Aspen Knolls =

Development in New York City

Coordinates: 40°33′43″N 74°11′07″W

Aspen Knolls Estates is a private community in Staten Island, New York City. It contains 944 single-family town homes and is located in the neighborhood of Arden Heights on the island's south shore, near the intersection of Arthur Kill and Woodrow Road. The development of the community was originally for Navy Housing.

Plans for this community began in the mid-1980s following the closing of the Saint Michael's orphanage (1982) with some of the land set aside for a church. The church also maintained a convent for the Presentation Sisters on the east side of the property. The church, now closed, and its grounds are surrounded on three sides by the Aspen Knolls Estates community, and by Arthur Kill Rd. on its fourth side. The Aspen Knolls Estates community was originally meant for housing of Navy families. However, due to Base Realignment and Closure, the housing contract was terminated in November 1994 after the closure of the Staten Island Homeport in Stapleton. With the community already planned, its builders decided to go through with construction and sell the homes to regular citizens. Construction began in 1995 and was finished in early 2006. During this time period, people moved into the community as each house was finished being built.

The community today has over 4,000 residents. It is known for taxing its residents unfairly through fines and violations, with many being suspicious as to where the money is funneled to. Notably, fines can be upwards of three hundred dollars for a parking infraction. Comparably, the City of New York would allot a fine of sixty-five dollars for a similar violation.

Surrounding two sides of this development (alongside the rear of homes lining Ilyssa Way from Arthur Kill Road to Woodrow Avenue.) is Arden Woods, with almost 200 undeveloped acres of forest and wetland, including some hiking trails.
