= Rossville, Staten Island =

Neighborhood in New York City

Rossville
- Neighborhood of Staten Island
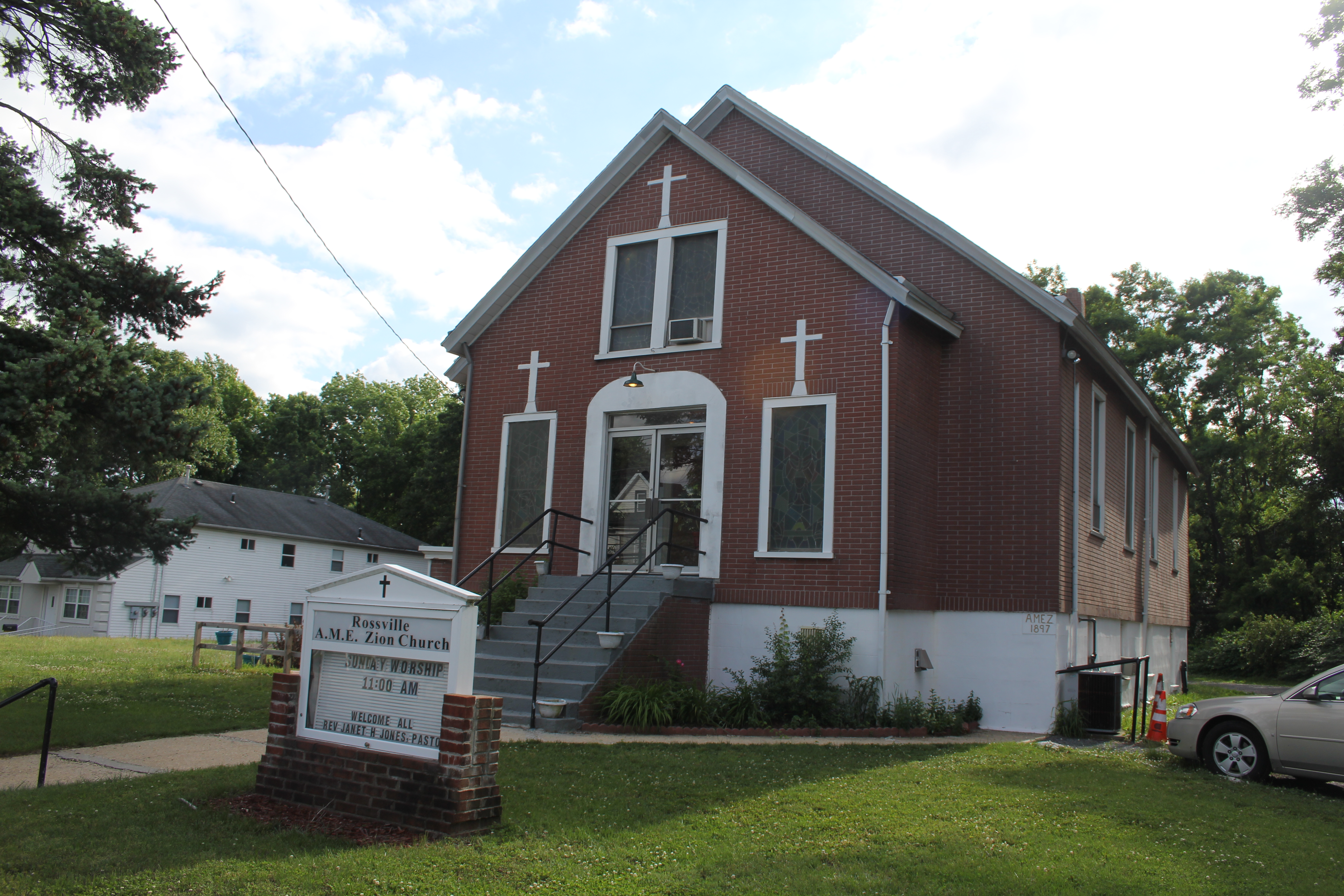
- Rossville A.M.E. Zion Church

- Location within New York City
- Coordinates: 40.541°N 74.217°W
- Country: United States
- State: New York
- City: New York City
- Borough: Staten Island
- Established: 1684

Rossville is a neighborhood of Staten Island, New York, on the island's South Shore. It is located to the north of Woodrow, to the west of Arden Heights, and to the south and east of the Arthur Kill. Rossville is located within Staten Island Community Board 3.

== History ==
=== Early history ===
Originally inhabited by the Raritan Indians, the area that eventually became known as Rossville remained largely free of European settlers until 1684 when the first land survey of the area was made by the British, who obtained Staten Island from the Dutch in the Treaty of Breda, which ended the Second Anglo-Dutch War. In 1692, Daniel Perrin, a Huguenot originally from Jersey, was granted 80 acres (320,000 m^{2}) of land in the area (then known as Smoking Point) by Governor Benjamin Fletcher. The earliest known permanent settlement of the area is thought to be around the early 1700s by Peter Winant (1654–1758), son of Pieterse Wynant, one of the earliest known permanent settlers of Staten Island, who arrived from Holland in 1661.

During the mid 18th century, the area was known as Old Blazing Star, and later simply Blazing Star, for a tavern located there. The Blazing Star Burial Ground, an abandoned cemetery dating from the mid-1750s, can be found just off Arthur Kill Road, north of Rossville Avenue (40.5568°N 74.2118°W). Also known as the Rossville (Blazing Star) Burial Ground or Sleight Family Graveyard became one of the first community burial grounds in Staten Island.

=== 19th century ===
The Blazing Star Ferry, which crossed the Arthur Kill to Woodbridge Township, New Jersey, was established in the years before the American Revolution. When the Richmond Turnpike (known today as Victory Boulevard) was built across Richmond County in 1816, it improved connections to the western parts of the island and to the competing New Blazing Star Ferry in Long Neck (known today as Travis), which had steamboat and stagecoach connections to Philadelphia.

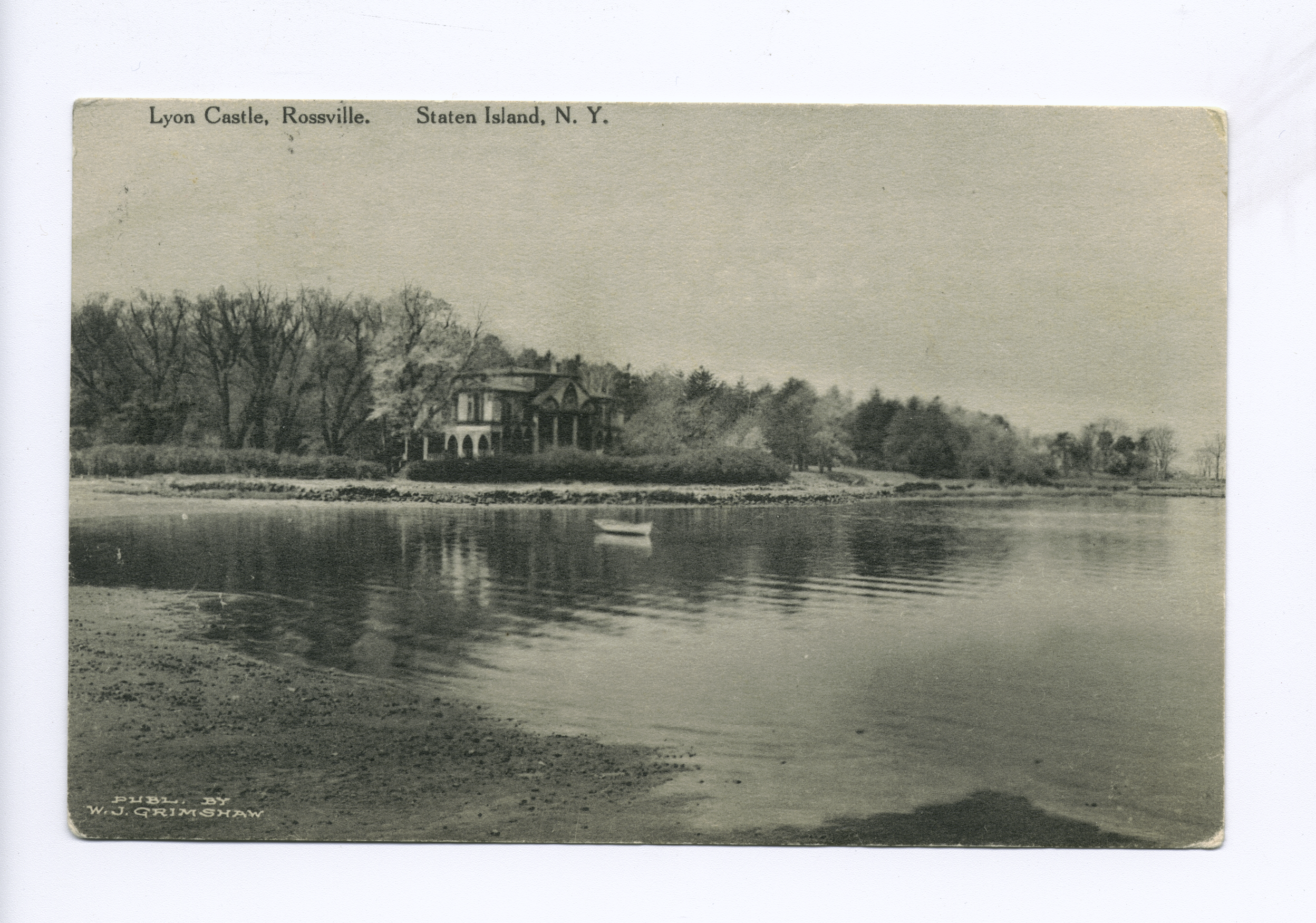
Lyon Castle, Rossville, early 20th century

By the 1830s the area was renamed Rossville after Colonel William E. Ross, who had built a replica of Windsor Castle (originally known as Ross Castle, later known as Lyon Castle) on a bluff overlooking the landing of the Blazing Star Ferry.

By the mid 19th century, Rossville was a thriving farm community and the village grew around it. However, when the Staten Island Railroad, which bypassed Rossville, opened in 1860, most Staten Islanders began referring to neighborhoods along its route by the name of the nearest station; hence Rossville became colloquially part of Prince's Bay.

Poor transportation caused the town's decline until the completion of the West Shore Expressway in 1976. The resulting residential building boom encouraged longtime farmers to sell their land to developers which fueled rapid growth in the area, continuing to this day.

==== Sandy Ground ====
Within Rossville is Sandy Ground, among the oldest surviving communities in the United States founded by free African Americans prior to the American Civil War, with the first documented land purchase by an African American in the area dating to 1828, just months after the abolition of slavery in New York State. Several of the community's historic structures are still extant, including five that have been designated as New York City landmarks, including a church, a cemetery, and three homes. Some residents also live in the original community.

After slavery in New York was abolished in 1827, freedmen settled in the area known since colonial times as Sandy Ground, which was located in the area around what is now the intersection of Bloomingdale and Woodrow Roads in Rossville. These early settlers were skilled in the oyster trade, and brought this knowledge with them to Staten Island. The island's main hub for oyster harvesting was Prince's Bay, within walking distance from the Sandy Ground community. Sandy Ground also served as an important stop on the Underground Railroad, and is the oldest continuously settled free black community in the United States. Oyster farming ended around 1916 due to water pollution in the harbor.

=== Fire of 1963 ===
On April 20, 1963, Rossville was the scene of the worst of three devastating brush fires to strike Staten Island; the three fires collectively destroyed more than 100 homes, rendering over 500 persons homeless and causing in excess of $2 million in damage. Although remnants of the original Sandy Ground settlement still exist, most of the original houses were destroyed in the fire.

Rossville's character was transformed permanently by the fire. Once the Verrazzano–Narrows Bridge was opened 19 months later, it and many other Staten Island neighborhoods saw massive new home construction. Many of the homes in Rossville which had been spared by the fire were demolished to make way for new, often larger ones.

=== Today ===
The Sandy Ground Historical Society, was organized on February 28, 1980 at 1538 Woodrow Road. It preserves the history and physical surroundings of the Sandy Ground community and maintains the Sandy Ground Historical Museum.

Although originally mostly farmland, Rossville has become largely suburban in nature—a fact lamented by its original residents, nearly all of whom have since moved away, in many cases after having been bought out under pressure from aggressive developers who have torn down most of the original homes and replaced them with condominium developments and semi-detached homes. Ten families descended from the original settlers, however, still lived in the area as of 2008.

== Demographics ==
For census purposes, the New York City Department of City Planning classifies Rossville as part of a larger Neighborhood Tabulation Area called Arden Heights-Rossville SI0303. This designated neighborhood had 30,683 inhabitants based on data from the 2020 United States Census. This was an increase of 767 persons (2.6%) from the 29,916 counted in 2010. The neighborhood had a population density of 19.8 inhabitants per acre (14,500/sq mi; 5,600/km^{2}).

The racial makeup of the neighborhood was 73.7% (22,611) White (Non-Hispanic), 1.5% (457) Black (Non-Hispanic), 9.6% (2,934) Asian, and 1.9% (587) from two or more races. Hispanic or Latino of any race were 12.9% (3,945) of the population.

According to the 2020 United States Census, this area has many cultural communities of over 1,000 inhabitants. This include residents who identify as Puerto Rican, German, Irish, Italian, Russian, Egyptian, and Chinese. 15.3% of the residents were foreign born.

Most inhabitants are higher-aged adults: 40.7% are between 40–64 years old. 75.2% of the households had at least one family present. Out of the 10,773 households, 56.2% had a married couple (24.0% with a child under 18), 4.2% had a cohabiting couple (1.4% with a child under 18), 14.0% had a single male (1.2% with a child under 18), and 25.6% had a single female (4.1% with a child under 18). 34.3% of households had children. In this neighborhood, 18.6% of non-vacant housing units are renter-occupied.

== Landmarks ==
=== Older structures ===
==== St. Joseph's Church and Cemetery ====
St. Joseph's Church, the oldest Roman Catholic church still standing on Staten Island, is located on Poplar Avenue in Rossville. St. Joseph's was founded on July 2, 1848, by Father Mark Murphy, pastor of St. Peter's Church, when he celebrated Mass for 58 Catholics in a house on Rossville Avenue as a mission of St. Peter's parish. In 1851, a small chapel dedicated to St. Joseph was completed on Poplar Avenue. When Father Francis DeCaro, O.F.M., was appointed as first pastor in 1855, St. Joseph's became an official parish — the third oldest of Staten Island's 36 parishes after St. Peter's and St. Mary's.

St. Joseph's Cemetery (located at the end of Barry Street), which dates from the early 1850s, is the second oldest Catholic cemetery on the island.

==== Rossville African Methodist Episcopal Zion Church ====
The Zion African Methodist Episcopal Church was formed on Dec. 5, 1850. William H. Pitts, was the first minister, and the founding members were Caesar Jackson, Francis Williams, William Webb, William H. Stevens, John J. Henry, Moses K. Harris, Israel Pitts, Isaac Purnell, Ishmael Robins, Henry Jackson, Elizabeth Titus, Sarah J. Landin, Esther V. S. Purnell, Ann M. Bishop, Grace Williams and Louisa Harris.

The current building is one of four African American churches on Staten Island which predate the 20th century. It is also one of two churches affiliated with African Methodism on the Island which predate the Civil War. Recently examination of the adjacent burial ground revealed the remains of over 500 interments (versus the 97 extant headstones), representing one of the larger collection of 19th Century African American burials in New York City.

==== Harris Home ====
One of the more prominent families to live there was the Harris family. The circa 1906 home of Isaac Harris still stands at 444 Bloomingdale Road. He was the son of Silas Harris, one of two brothers who settled in Sandy Ground with their families early in its history. The Isaac Harris house was designed by architect Stanford White of the firm of McKim, Meade and White, who drew up the plans as a gift after Harris' years of service on his household staff. The house boasts a gambrel roof and front bay. Harris' home is one of only about 12 of the original old homes still standing in the community.

Many families still live in the community that was founded by their ancestors.

==== Landmark properties ====
Five properties have been designated as New York City landmarks.

Landmark Name	Address	When Built	Image	Date Designated
Reverend Isaac Coleman and Rebecca Gray Coleman House	1482 Woodrow Road	before 1859		February 1, 2011
Rossville A.M.E. Zion Church	584 Bloomingdale Road	1897		February 1, 2011
Rossville A.M.E. Zion Church Cemetery	124 Crabtree Avenue	circa 1852		April 9, 1985
Baymen's cottages	565 and 569 Bloomingdale Road	1887–1898		February 1, 2011

=== Newer structures ===
==== Witte Marine Scrapyard ====
One of the largest marine scrapyards on the East Coast, the Witte Marine Scrapyard, known as the Staten Island boat graveyard, is located at 2453 Arthur Kill Road. Now officially known as the Donjon Iron and Metal Scrap Processing Facility, the scrapyard was opened in 1964 by J. Arnold Witte, Sr. The scrapyard is known for its large assortment of obsolete steam tugs, ferries, carfloats, and other craft. Witte acquired them faster than he could break them up; the end result is dozens of vessels slowly rotting in the muck of the Arthur Kill. A number of noteworthy vessels, including the New York City Fire Department fireboat Abram S. Hewitt, which was involved in the rescue of survivors of the 1904 General Slocum tragedy and was the last coal-burning fireboat in operation in the FDNY's fleet, can be found here. Scenes from the 2010 thriller Salt, starring Angelina Jolie, were filmed on location at the Witte Marine Scrapyard.

==== Woodbrooke Estates and Fawn Ridge ====
There are two large condominium developments in Rossville. One is known as Woodbrooke Estates, which is a 629-unit development with 2-, 3-, and 4-bedroom condominiums. This development was completed in phases between 1981 and 1987. Woodbrooke Estates is surrounded by Barry Street to the north, Rossville Avenue to the east, Winant Avenue to the west, and Gervil Street (between Balsam Place and Correll Avenue) to the south. The other, slightly smaller condominium development in Rossville is Fawn Ridge, a 521-unit development which borders Woodbrooke Estates to the south. Fawn Ridge, which was constructed by Muss Development Company (the same developer that built Woodbrooke Estates), was built between 1987 and 1990, and is located along Correll Avenue, between Rossville Avenue to the east, and Winant Avenue to the west. A 26,000-square-foot (2,400 m^{2}) shopping center, located at the corner of Rossville Avenue and Grafe Street, was opened in 1992.

== Fire safety ==
Rossville is home to the city's first new fire company in over a decade, FDNY Engine Company 168, which was organized in June 2005. Engine 168 operates out of a brand new firehouse located at the corner of Rossville Avenue and Veterans Road East, which was built in 2004, and is staffed with an FDNY EMS Battalion.

== Education ==
Rossville is served by the New York City Department of Education and is located in Region 7, Community School District 31.

Elementary school students are zoned to PS 56 Louis DeSario School, and middle school students are zoned to either IS 75 Frank D. Paulo School or IS 34 Totten School. For children with learning and emotional disabilities, there is a K-12 special education school called South Richmond High School PS/IS 25.

The Roman Catholic elementary school in the area is the St. Joseph - St. Thomas School.

Nearby high schools include Tottenville High School and St. Joseph by the Sea High School.

== Huguenot Park Library (upcoming) ==
The New York Public Library (NYPL) operates the Huguenot Park branch, currently located at 830 Huguenot Avenue near the intersection with Drumgoole Road East. Opened on January 2, 1985, the branch has served residents of the surrounding area, including Huguenot, Woodrow, Arden Heights, Annadale, Eltingville, and Prince’s Bay, providing access to books, educational programs, and community resources.

As part of broader efforts to modernize library infrastructure and expand services on Staten Island, the Huguenot Park branch is in the process of relocating to a new facility at 1231 Woodrow Road within the neighborhood. The planned building is expected to span approximately 7,500 square feet and will include dedicated spaces for adults, children, and teens, expanded technology, outdoor programming space, and community event areas.

Construction of the new facility was celebrated with a groundbreaking event in November 2024, and the project is anticipated to be completed by summer 2026. In preparation for the transition, the current Huguenot Park branch is scheduled to close on May 2, 2026 ahead of the move to the new location. The relocation is expected to enhance accessibility for residents and contribute to the continued development and identity of the neighborhood.

== Transportation ==
Rossville is served by the S74/S84 local buses on Bloomingdale Road and Rossville Avenue, and the S55 on Bloomingdale Road. It is also served by the SIM25 Manhattan express bus on Rossville Avenue, and the SIM26 on Bloomingdale Road. Some parts of Rossville are also within walking distance to the Pleasant Plains station on the Staten Island Railway. New York State Route 440 passes through Rossville.

== Notable residents ==
- James A. Bradley (1830–1921) – brush maker, New Jersey politician, founder of Asbury Park and Bradley Beach
- Jasper Francis Cropsey (1823–1900) – landscape artist of the Hudson River School, born on his family's farm in Rossville
- Caleb Lyon (1822–1875) – New York politician, later Governor of the Territory of Idaho
- Daniel Rodriguez (born 1964) – operatic tenor known as "The Singing Policeman" for his former work in NYPD's Ceremonial Unit
