= Bloomingdale Park =

Public park in Staten Island, New York

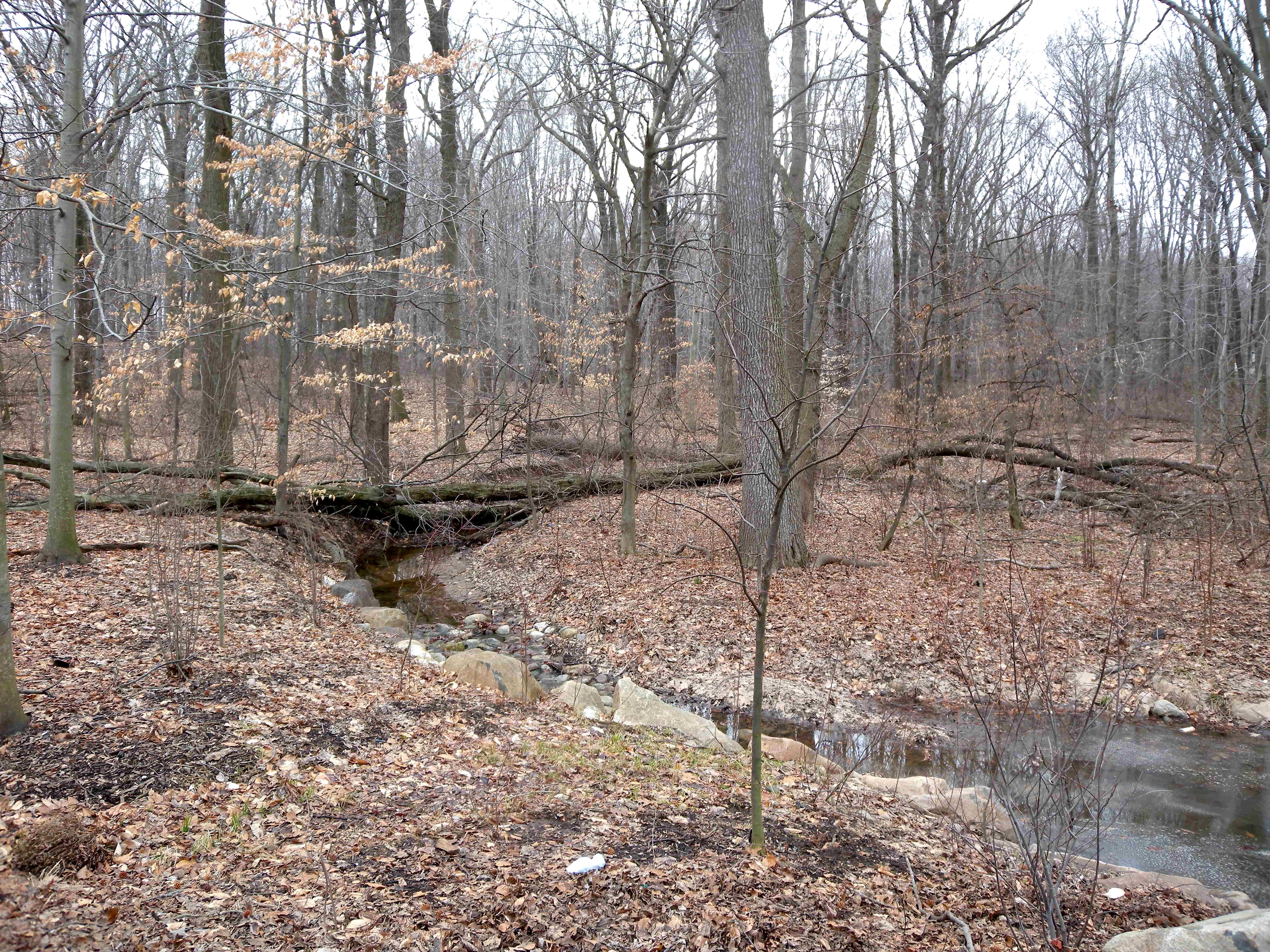
Sandy Brook flows southward from Drumgoole Road

Bloomingdale Park is a 138-acre (56 ha) park on the South Shore of Staten Island. It is located in the Prince's Bay neighborhood, and is bounded on the north by Ramona Avenue, on the west by Bloomingdale Road, on the east by Lenevar Avenue, and on the south by Drumgoole Road West and the Korean War Veterans Parkway. It is nearly bisected by Maguire Avenue, but the avenue's two spurs into the park from the north and south do not meet in the middle.

Beginning in February 2003 15 acres (6.1 ha) of park were renovated and upgraded with the addition of sports fields, walking and biking paths, a playground and rest center at the corner of Ramona and Lenevar Avenues which serves residents in the western portion of Woodrow. On the corner of Maguire Avenue and Drumgoole Road West, there is also a small pond habitat which was made accessible by a footpath. All the recent renovations took place to east of Maguire Avenue, and west of there remains untouched woodlands.

Bloomingdale Park was also the name of a public park in Manhattan in the 1800s. It was located in the Kips Bay neighborhood, at 31st Street and First Avenue, on land now occupied by the New York University Medical Center (close to 40.7419°N 73.9748°W). It was on that site that the first international cricket match was held, between teams representing the United States and Canada, in the early fall of 1844.

== See also ==
- Canadian cricket team in the United States in 1844
