= Everett E. Hatcher =

American Special Agent of the Drug Enforcement Administration

Everett E. Hatcher (October 9, 1942 – February 28, 1989) was an American Special Agent of the Drug Enforcement Administration who was shot and killed during a 1989 undercover operation in Staten Island. The Murder of DEA Agent Hatcher by Costabile Farace was the first murder of a DEA agent in New York City since 1972.

Hatcher was educated at PS 134 in Queens and De Witt Clinton High School in the Bronx. He obtained a bachelor's degree from Hampton Institute and a master's degree from Boston University. He served in the US Army as a Deputy Provost Marshal in Germany, and after the military, worked as a teacher in New York City schools and then as an investigator for the New York County District Attorney. Hatcher joined the DEA in 1977 serving for 12 years ending in his death on the job.

In 1996, New York City Mayor Rudolph W. Giuliani unveiled a street sign on West 17th Street and 10th Avenue honorarily naming the street, the location of the DEA's New York Regional office, as "Special Agent Everett E. Hatcher Place".
