= Kreischer House =

Historic house in Staten Island, New York

- Kreischer Mansion
- U.S. National Register of Historic Places
- New York City Landmark
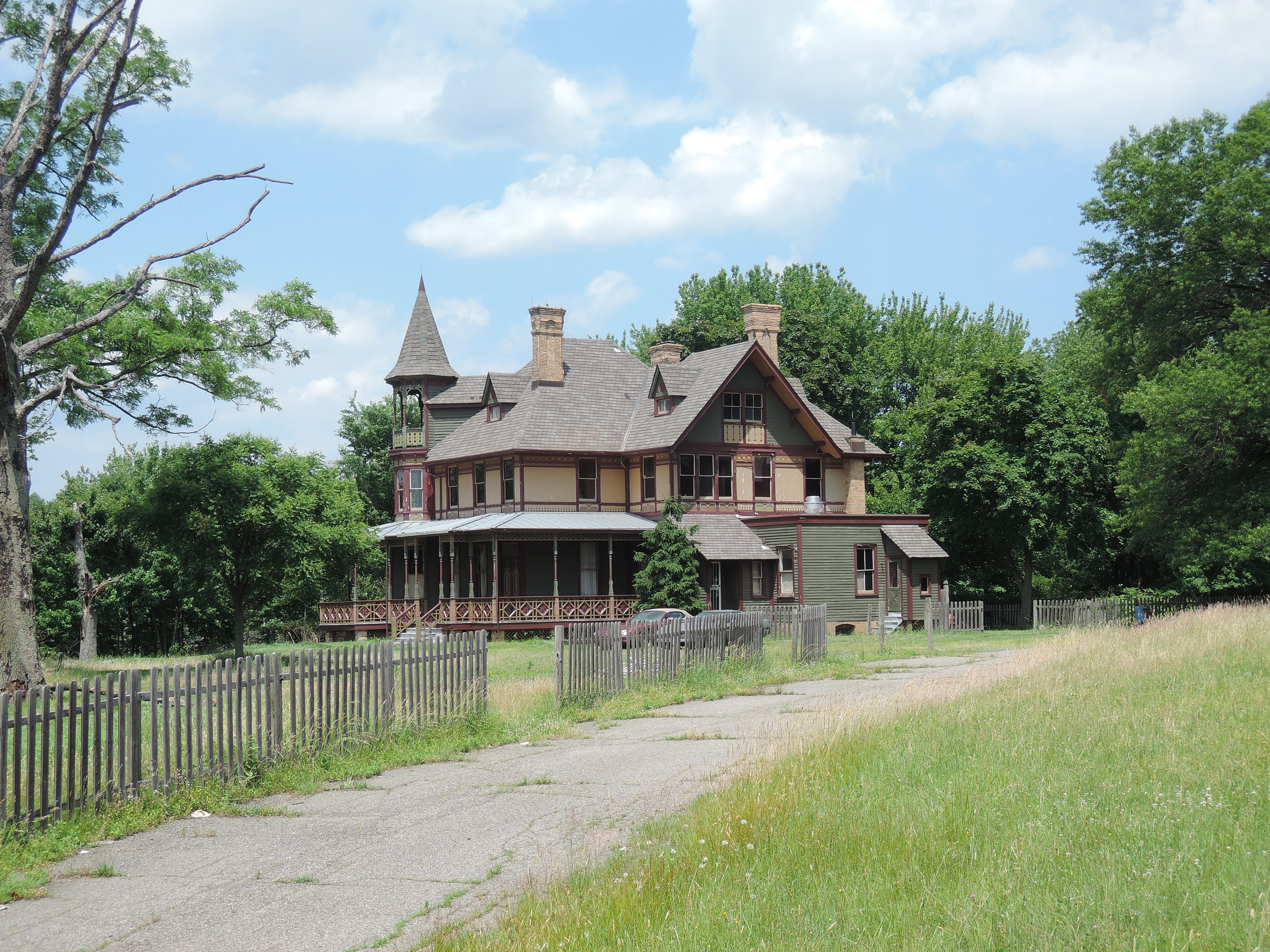

- Location within New York City Location within New York Location within the United States
- Location: 4500 Arthur Kill Rd., Staten Island, New York
- Coordinates: 40°31′57″N 74°14′18″W
- Area: 1 acre (0.40 ha)
- Built: ca. 1885
- Architectural style: American Queen Anne
- NRHP reference No.: 82001199
- NYCL No.: 0391

Significant dates
- Added to NRHP: October 29, 1982
- Designated NYCL: February 20, 1968

Kreischer House, also known as Kreischer Mansion, is a historic home located in Charleston, Staten Island. Built by German immigrant Balthasar Kreischer about 1885, it is a large, asymmetrically massed 2 1/2-story, wood-frame house in the American Queen Anne style. The rectangular house features spacious verandas, gables with jigsaw bargeboards, decorative railings, posts and brackets, tall chimneys, and a corner tower. It was one of two mansions built by Kreischer for his sons. The surviving house belonged to son Edward Kreischer; the other, to his brother Charles. It was added to the National Register of Historic Places in 1982.

== History ==
On June 8, 1894, Edward B. Kreischer allegedly committed suicide by shooting himself in the right temple near his place of business, although murder is an ongoing theory. (Reportedly, his wife had an affair with a doctor, Kreischer found out, and his wife was poisoning him with the doctor's help.) Since then, there have been claims that Kreischer has haunted the property. Along with other local stories of the house's violent history, this has given the house a supernatural reputation, leading it to be used as a location on television shows including Boardwalk Empire.

In 1998, the Kreischer Mansion was bought with the intention of restoration and eventual sale by Isaac Yomtovian. In 2008, then caretaker Joseph "Joe Black" Young was revealed to be a hitman for the Bonanno crime family, more specifically serving under Bonanno soldier Gino Galestro. He was convicted of the murder of rival mob associate Robert McKelvey, committed three years earlier on the property. The house was sold in 2024 to Eric Bischoff and Julia Mackie, who restored it; the project received $445,000 in state funding.

== See also ==
- List of New York City Designated Landmarks in Staten Island
- National Register of Historic Places listings in Richmond County, New York
