= Wolfe's Pond Park =

Public park in Staten Island, New York

Coordinates: 40°31′18″N 74°11′35″W

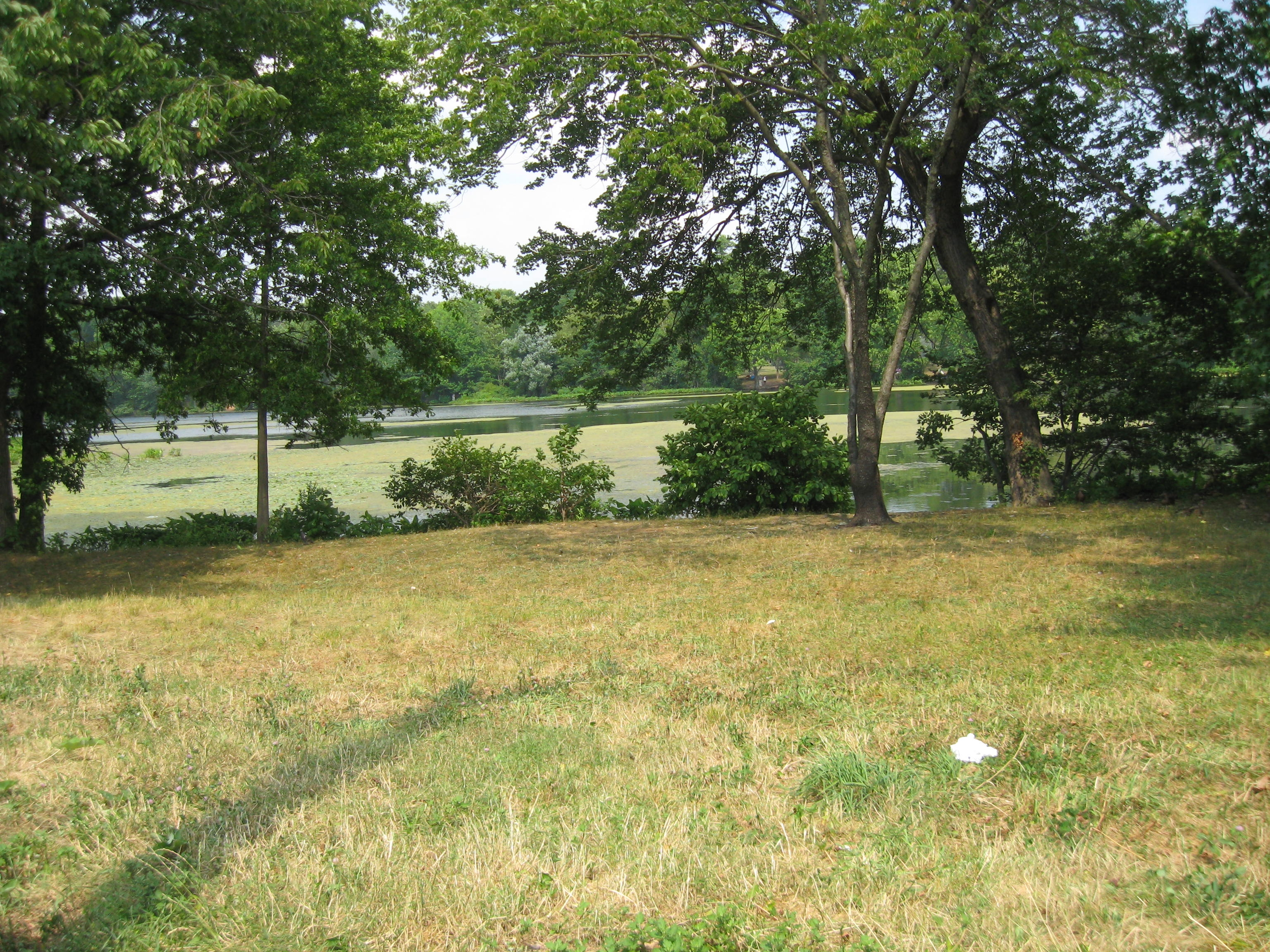
Pond

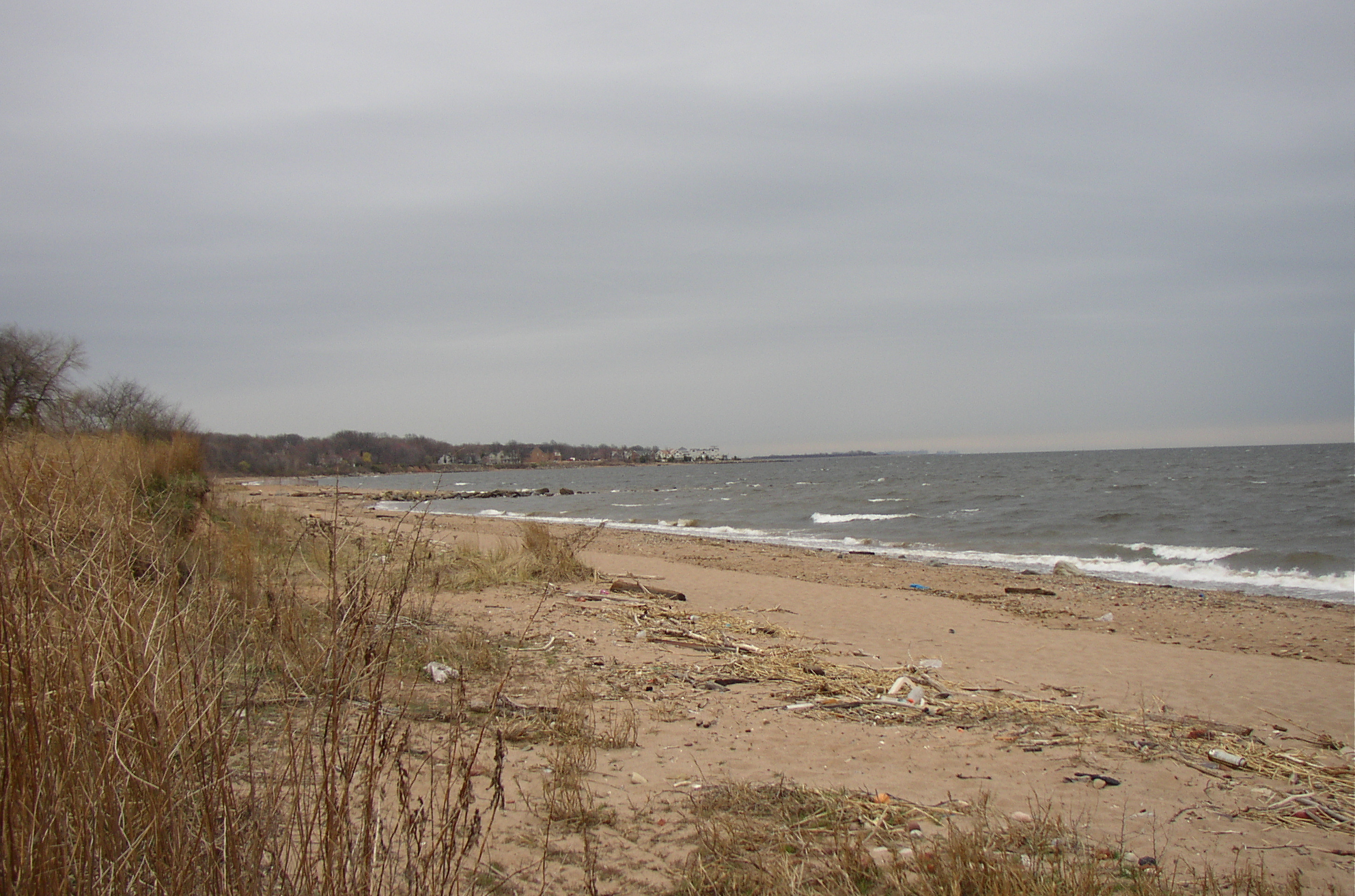
Beach in the park

Wolfe's Pond Park is a large public park located on Staten Island's South Shore. It is bounded on the west by Holton Avenue, on the south by Raritan Bay, on the northwest by the Staten Island Railway, and on the north & east by Chisholm Street, Luten Avenue, and Cornelia Avenue, which is also the main entry into the park's public areas. Hylan Boulevard bisects the park, and most visitors only visit the eastern half of the park, where Wolfes Pond (for which the park is named), two playgrounds, and basketball and tennis courts are located, as well as numerous walking and biking paths, open fields, and a small beach on Raritan Bay. The northern, inland half consists mostly of ponds and woodlands, and the northeastern corner hugs Tottenville High School.

In 1991 and again in 2011 the dam between the beach and the pond broke, draining the pond of freshwater and flooding it with saltwater. In both cases, this killed the freshwater fish and many of the red-eared slider turtles. Repairs to the dam were completed in November, 2019.

From 1941 to the 1970s Robert Moses had planned to build the Wolfe's Pond Parkway into the park from Richmond Parkway. Between 1995 and 1998, the park was upgraded, and public areas were expanded. With this came the addition of the second playground on the east side of the park, as well as the sports areas, a new entrance to the beach, and a new monument to the Battle of the Bulge. Every 4th of July, the park holds a fireworks show, with live entertainment and food venues. This popular show draws hundreds of Staten Island residents from the South Shore and elsewhere every year.
