= Woodrow, Staten Island =

Neighborhood in New York City

Coordinates: 40°32′36″N 74°11′50″W

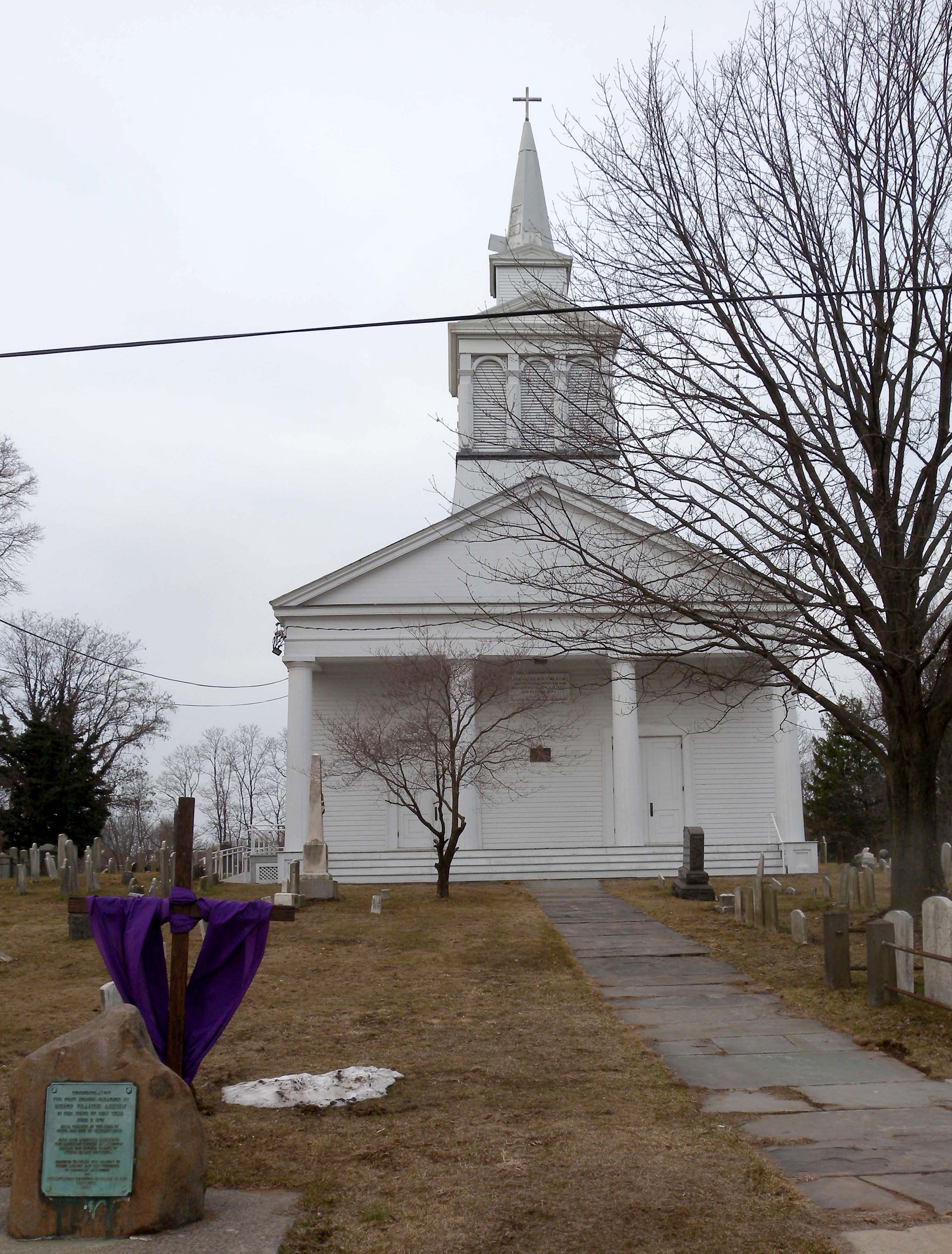
Woodrow United Methodist Church

Woodrow is a neighborhood located on the South Shore of Staten Island, New York, United States. The neighborhood is represented in the New York State Senate by Andrew Lanza, in the New York State Assembly by Michael Reilly, and in the New York City Council by Joe Borelli.

The first Methodist church in the immediate New York City area opened in the neighborhood in 1771. Known today as the Woodrow United Methodist Church, its original congregants included some of the island's earliest well-known families. It was listed on the National Register of Historic Places in 1982.

Long regarded as the western part of Huguenot, pursuant to the custom of old-time Staten Islanders of naming a particular East Shore or South Shore neighborhood after the nearest station on the Staten Island Railway. The Prince's Bay post office is actually located in Woodrow, as well as I.S. 75.

Woodrow is part of Staten Island Community District 3 and its ZIP Code is 10312. Woodrow is patrolled by the 123rd Precinct of the New York City Police Department.

== Demographics ==
For census purposes, the New York City Department of City Planning classifies Woodrow as part of a larger Neighborhood Tabulation Area called Annadale-Huguenot-Prince's Bay-Woodrow SI0304. This designated neighborhood had 40,534 inhabitants based on data from the 2020 United States Census. This was an increase of 2,374 persons (6.2%) from the 38,160 counted in 2010. The neighborhood had a population density of 9.9 inhabitants per acre (14,500/sq mi; 5,600/km2).

The racial makeup of the neighborhood was 82.1% (33,263) White (Non-Hispanic), 0.7% (299) Black (Non-Hispanic), 5.9% (2,372) Asian, 2.3% (945) from some other race or from two or more races. Hispanic or Latino of any race were 9.0% (3,655) of the population.

According to the 2020 United States Census, this area has many cultural communities of over 1,000 inhabitants. These groups are residents who identify as Puerto Rican, English, Polish, Russian, Chinese, German, Irish, and Italian.

Most inhabitants are higher-aged adults: 28.5% are between 45-64 years old. 74.1% of the households had at least one family present. Out of the 14,464 households, 58.0% had a married couple (23.3% with a child under 18), 3.9% had a cohabiting couple (1.2% with a child under 18), 14.8% had a single male (1.4% with a child under 18), and 23.2% had a single female (3.5% with a child under 18). 32.5% of households had children. In this neighborhood, 26.3% of non-vacant housing units are renter-occupied.

== Education ==
=== Schools ===
P.S 62 and P.S 56 are located in Woodrow. P.S 3 and P.S 6 are also located near Woodrow. I.S 75, an intermediate school is located in Woodrow. Some intermediate school students living in Woodrow are zoned for I.S 34. St. Thomas-St. Joseph School is a Private Catholic school located near Woodrow. It serves grades Pre-K3-8. The local public High School is Tottenville High School which is located in the Huguenot section of Staten Island. St. Joseph by the Sea High School, a Catholic High School, is located near the neighborhood as well.

=== Library ===
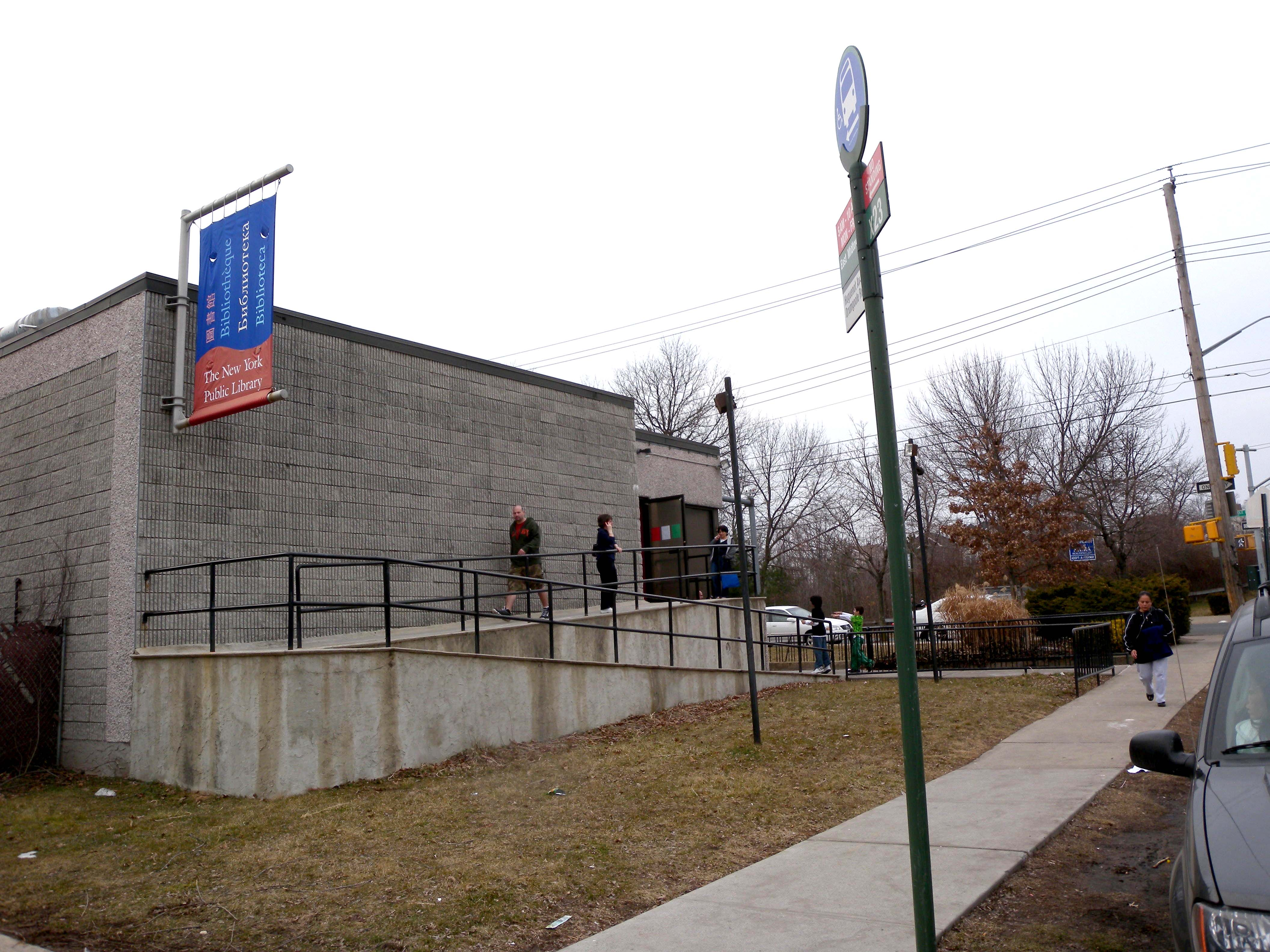
New York Public Library, Huguenot Park branch

The New York Public Library (NYPL) operates the Huguenot Park branch at 830 Huguenot Avenue, near the intersection with Drumgoole Road East. The branch opened in January 1985, replacing what was once the smallest New York Public Library building just east of the station (still standing). The Huguenot Park branch was possibly named in honor of the nearby Staten Island Railway station's former name.

== Transportation ==
Woodrow is served by the S56 local bus on Woodrow and Foster Roads; the S55 bus on Bloomingdale Road; and the S74 and S84 on Woodrow Road, Bloomingdale Road, and Rossville Avenue. Express bus service to Manhattan is provided by the SIM25 along Rossville Avenue and Foster Road and the SIM26 along Bloomingdale Road.

The Korean War Veterans Parkway and New York State Route 440 both pass through the neighborhood.
