= New York State Route 440 =

State highway in Staten Island, New York, US

New York State Route 440
- Map of Staten Island in New York City with NY 440 highlighted in red

Route information
- Maintained by NYSDOT and PANYNJ
- Length: 12.7 mi (20.4 km)
- Existed: 1949–present

Major junctions
- South end: Route 440 at the New Jersey state line near Tottenville
- Korean War Veterans Parkway in Charleston; I-278 from Bloomfield to Bulls Head/Graniteville
- North end: Route 440 at the New Jersey state line in Port Richmond

Location
- Country: United States
- State: New York
- Counties: Richmond

Highway system
- New York Highways; Interstate; US; State; Reference; Parkways
← NY 439A	→ NY 441

New York State Route 440 (NY 440) is a freeway located entirely on Staten Island in New York City. The route acts as a connector between the two segments of New Jersey Route 440, running from the Staten Island neighborhood of Charleston in the south to Port Richmond in the north. NY 440 is connected to the two New Jersey segments by the Outerbridge Crossing to the south and the Bayonne Bridge to the north. It is one of several signed New York State routes that are not connected to any others in the state, and one of only two New York State routes (NY 426 being the other) that is the middle section of another state's highway bearing the same number. From the Korean War Veterans Parkway to I-278, it is known as the West Shore Expressway. North of I-278, it is named the Dr. Martin Luther King Jr. Expressway (also known as the Willowbrook Expressway). NY 440 is the southernmost state route in the state of New York.

== Route description ==
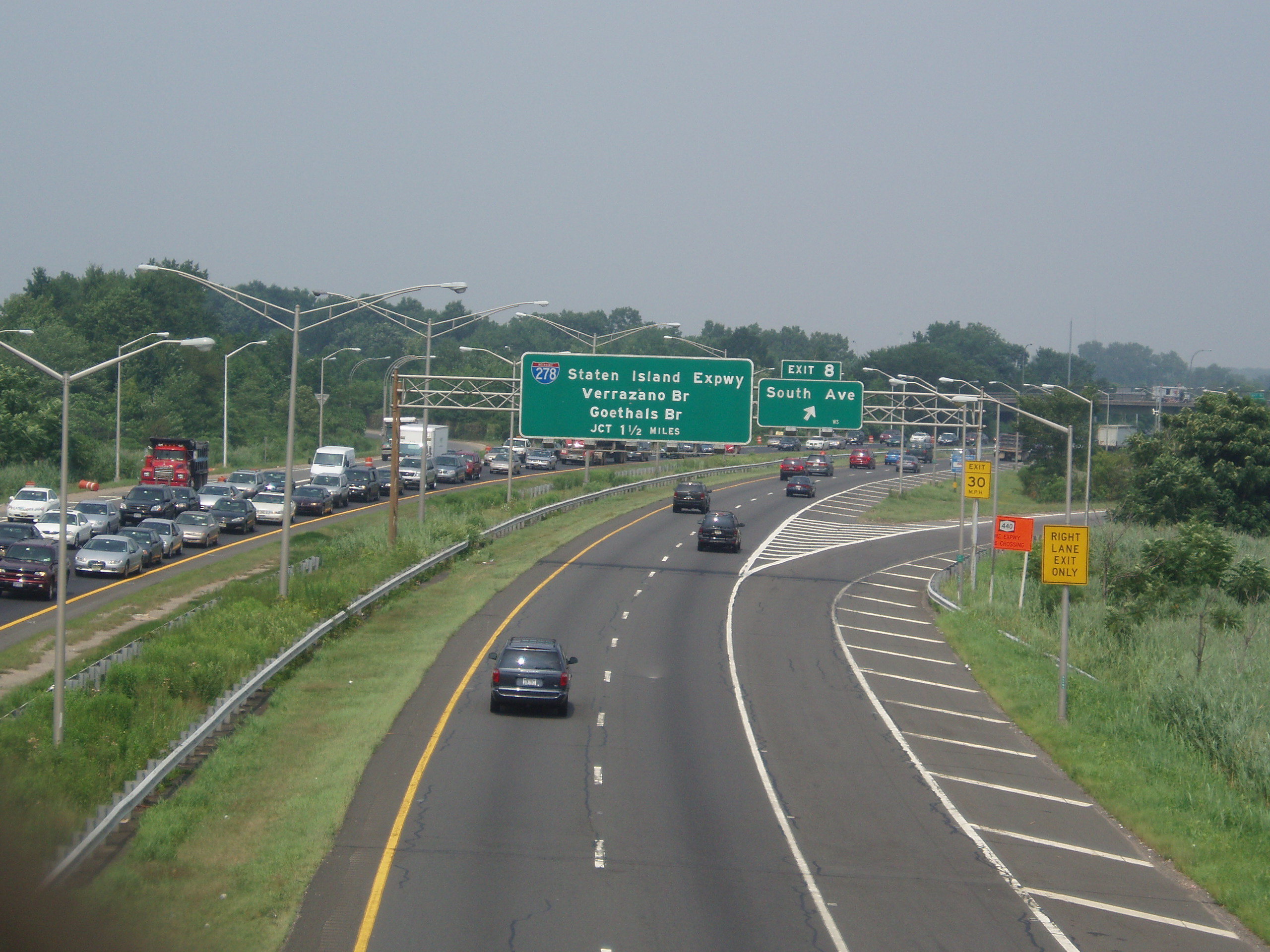
The West Shore Expressway northbound as seen from Meredith Avenue

NY 440 begins at the New York–New Jersey state line, mid-span on the east-west Outerbridge Crossing over the Arthur Kill in the Charleston neighborhood of Staten Island. The four-lane bridge crosses east through Charleston and over Arthur Kill Road.

After entering Staten Island, NY 440 passes through a toll barrier for eastbound traffic entering the city. Immediately following the toll barrier is a ramp to Page Avenue, the eastbound exit 1. In the westbound direction, the ramp to Arthur Kill Road is exit 1.

After Page Avenue, NY 440 enters a partial cloverleaf interchange with the Korean War Veterans Parkway (though often referred to as the Richmond Parkway, its name until 1997) and a nearby park and ride. At exit 2 in Charleston, NY 440 exits the right-of-way it entered on, which becomes the Korean War Veterans Parkway, while NY 440 proceeds north as the co-signed West Shore Expressway.

The West Shore Expressway continues north as a four-lane expressway, entering exit 3, a ramp to Woodrow Road going northbound. Crossing into the Rossville neighborhood, the expressway enters exit 3 southbound, connecting to Bloomingdale Road, and parallels a section of the Arthur Kill. Crossing north of South Shore Golf Course, the West Shore enters exit 4, an interchange with Huguenot Avenue. Continuing northeast, NY 440 is routed parallel with the eastern side of the former Fresh Kills Landfill, with exit 5 providing access to Arden Avenue. Bending northward once again, the West Shore crosses over Fresh Kills creek, and passes through a portion of the William T. Davis Wildlife Refuge. West Shore continues through the Chelsea-Travis neighborhood, accessible at exit 7 through a service road interchange with Victory Boulevard (itself previously designated as NY 439A, until c. 1968).

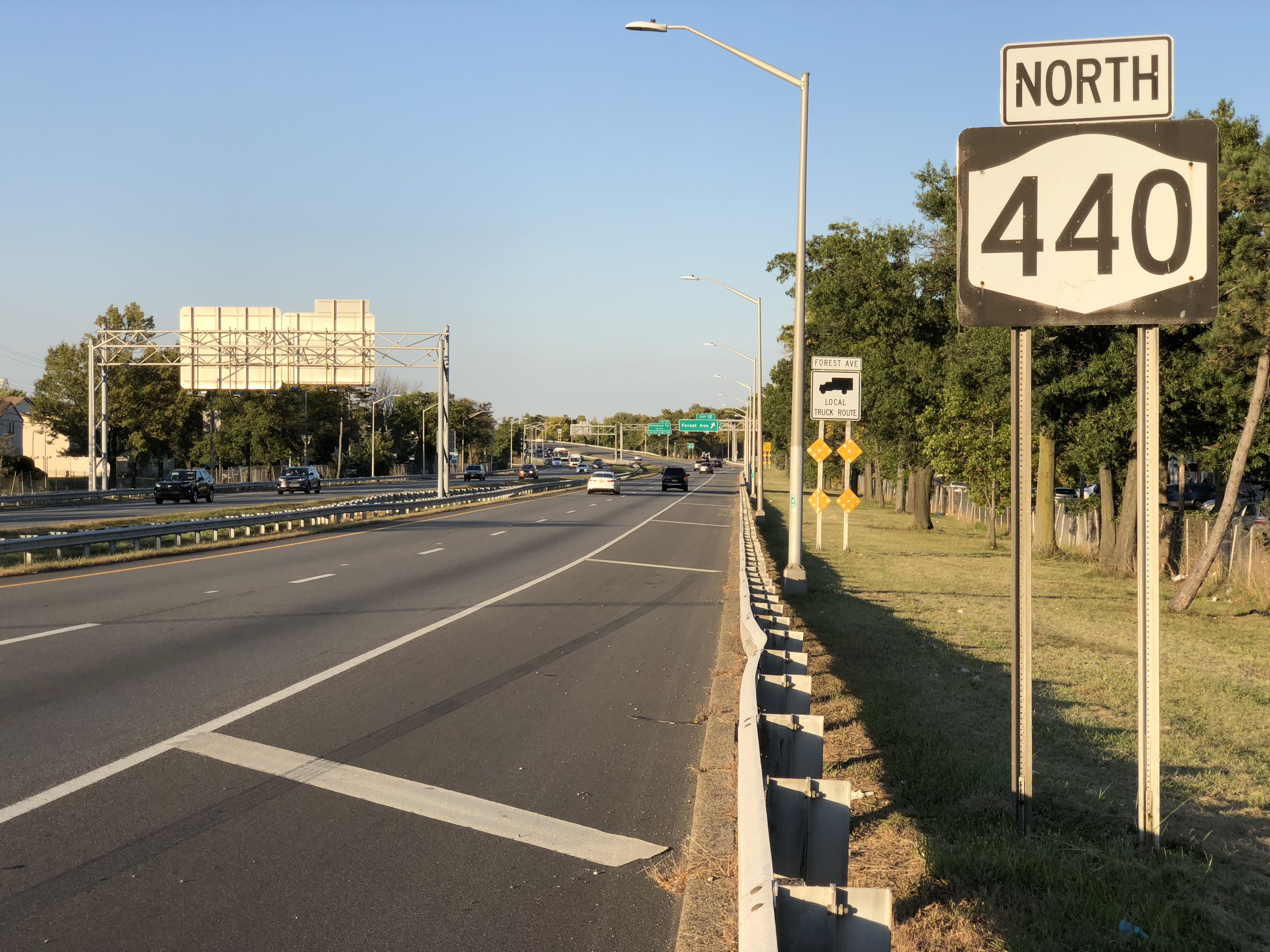
NY 440 northbound past I-278 in Staten Island

Running along the northern end of Travis, the West Shore Expressway parallels nearby railroad tracks before entering exit 8, a ramp to South Avenue and the Bloomfield neighborhood. Just a bit further north, the expressway enters exit 9 northbound, a single ramp to Glen Street. Just north of Glen Street, the West Shore Expressway enters a semi-directional T interchange with the northwest-southeast Staten Island Expressway portion of I-278. At this interchange, NY 440 and I-278 become concurrent for a short distance on the Staten Island Expressway, a four-lane expressway along the northern tier of Staten Island. Along this stretch, NY 440 and I-278 meet Richmond Avenue at exit 7. Just to the east, the expressway enters exit 9, which serves as a junction with the Dr. Martin Luther King Jr. Expressway (the Dr. MLK Jr., also known, for its initial portion, as the Willowbrook Expressway).

NY 440 turns north off I-278 and continues as the Dr. MLK Jr. Expressway, just north of an interchange with Victory Boulevard. The Dr. MLK Jr. Expressway crosses north through Staten Island, with the neighborhoods of Graniteville then Mariners Harbor on the west side, while Westerleigh then Elm Park (technically a portion of the Port Richmond neighborhood) are on the east side. Dr. MLK Jr. enters exit 12, a junction with Forest Avenue (the portion used by the previously designated, until 1968, NY 439), forming a "four corners" of the neighborhoods just mentioned. Continuing north, Dr. MLK Jr. enters exit 13, which connects to Walker Street in Port Richmond. Just north of exit 13, NY 440 passes through an electronic toll collection gantry (for traffic crossing from New Jersey over the Bergen Point Reach to enter onto the northside of Staten Island), then slopes onto the abutments of the Bayonne Bridge, condensing to four lanes. A short distance to the north, NY 440 crosses the state line back into New Jersey, continuing north as Route 440 into the city of Bayonne.

== History ==
The Willowbrook Parkway as originally planned

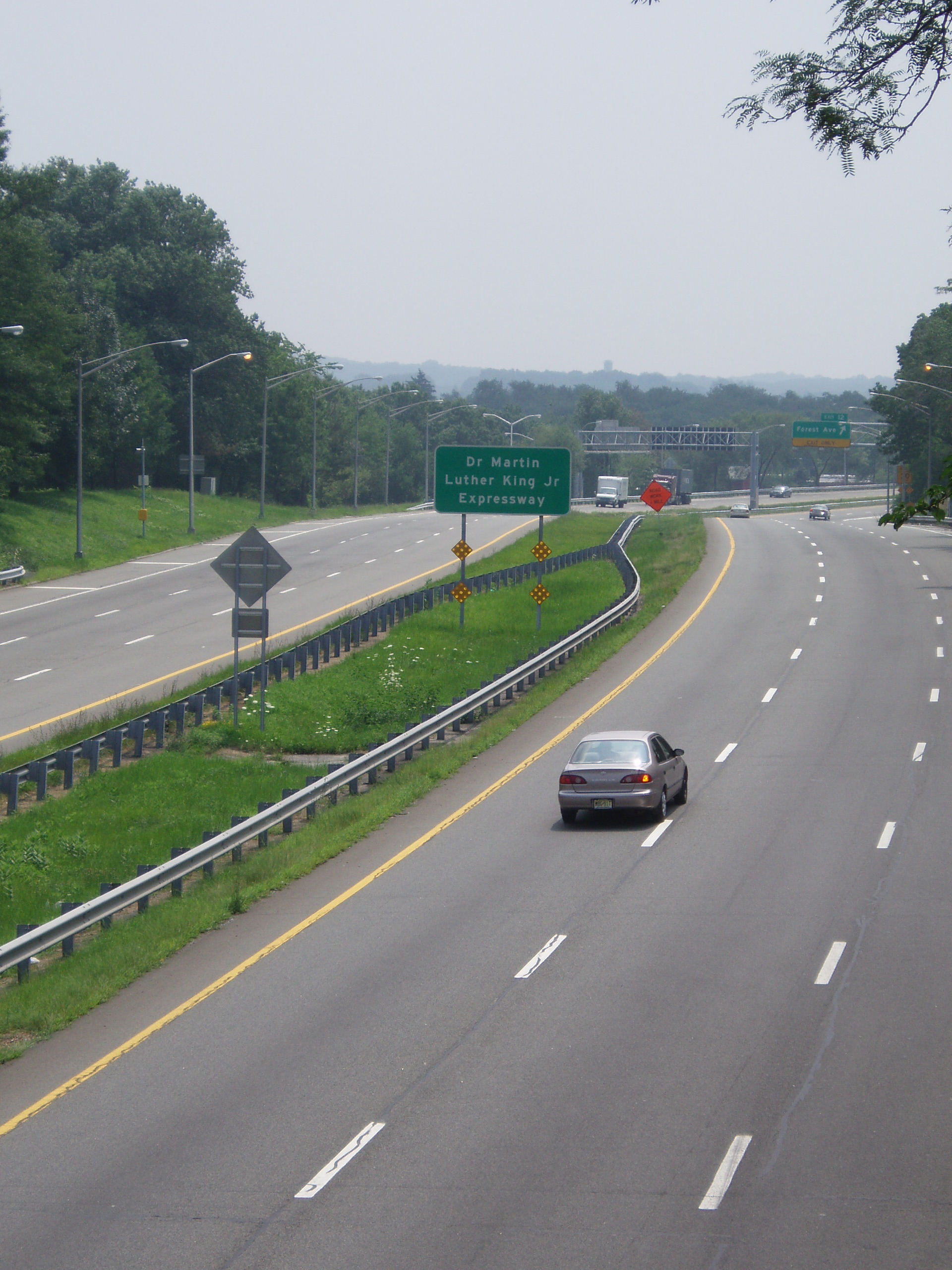
The Dr. Martin Luther King Jr. Expressway, southbound, from Walker Street.

NY 440 was initially designated in 1949, beginning at the Outerbridge Crossing and ending at the Bayonne Bridge, as it does today; however, the route was originally routed on Drumgoole Boulevard and Richmond Avenue in between the two bridges. In the early 1950s, proposals surfaced for the Willowbrook Parkway, which would extend from Staten Island Marine Park (later Great Kills Park and now part of the Gateway National Recreation Area) on the island's East Shore to the Bayonne Bridge via Egbertville and Bulls Head. A second highway, the West Shore Expressway, was proposed c. 1961. As proposed, it would begin at the Outerbridge Crossing and run along the west shore of Staten Island to meet the Clove Lakes Expressway (I-278) near the Goethals Bridge. The first section of the Willowbrook Parkway—from I-278 north to modern exit 13—was completed by 1965. A short extension south to Victory Boulevard was opened to traffic by 1968. The highway was also renamed the Willowbrook Expressway by this time. It was never extended past Victory Boulevard as opposition from both local property owners and environmental activists prevented construction of the rest of the highway. Its original route has never been formally demapped, however. NY 440 was realigned to follow the Willowbrook Expressway by 1970.

Drumgoole Boulevard was transformed into a freeway in the late 1960s and early 1970s and renamed the Richmond Parkway (now the Korean War Veterans Parkway) c. 1973; however, NY 440 initially continued to follow the parkway. The segment of the West Shore Expressway southwest of Huguenot Avenue was opened c. 1973 and became part of a realigned NY 440 on July 1, 1977. NY 440 left the expressway at Huguenot Avenue and followed Arthur Kill Road east to Richmond Avenue, where it continued north on its original alignment. The former alignment of NY 440 on the Richmond Parkway was redesignated as Temporary NY 440. When the West Shore Expressway was completed in 1976, the Temporary NY 440 designation was eliminated while NY 440 was shifted westward to follow the West Shore and Clove Lakes Expressways between Huguenot Avenue and the Willowbrook Expressway.

In the mid-1960s, officials in New Jersey and New York considered extending the I-287 designation eastward from its current terminus at the New Jersey Turnpike (I-95) to Staten Island via New Jersey Route 440 and the Richmond Parkway. The idea was eventually halted soon afterward. However, it is possible that the New York State Department of Transportation may reconsider these plans in the future. In 1990, the Willowbrook Expressway was renamed the Dr. Martin Luther King Jr. Expressway in honor of Martin Luther King Jr., the famous civil rights leader. However, it is sometimes still called the Willowbrook Expressway by many locals today. The West Shore Expressway was ceremonially designated the Pearl Harbor Veterans Expressway by New York Governor George Pataki in 1999. However, the expressway's official name did not change.

== Exit list ==
The entire route is in the New York City borough of Staten Island.

Location	mi	km	Exit	Destinations	Notes
Arthur Kill	0.0	0.0		Route 440 south to G.S. Parkway – New Jersey	Continuation into New Jersey
Arthur Kill	0.0	0.0	Outerbridge Crossing (northbound toll; E-ZPass or pay-by-plate)		
Charleston	0.6	0.97	1	Arthur Kill Rd	Southbound exit and entrance; access via Veterans Road West
Charleston	0.6	0.97	1	Page Ave TO Hylan Blvd Korean War Veterans Parkway begins	Northbound exit and entrance; access via Boscombe Avenue; southern terminus of Korean War Veterans Parkway
Charleston	1.1	1.8	2	Korean War Veterans Parkway north to Richmond Ave – Park & Ride	Northern end of the concurrency with Korean War Veterans Parkway; former routing of NY 440
Charleston	2.0	3.2	3A	Englewood Ave	Southbound exit and northbound entrance; opened September 30, 2014; serves Clay Pit Ponds State Park
Charleston	2.0	3.2	3	To Woodrow Rd	Northbound exit only; access via Clay Pit Road
Charleston–Rossville line			3B	Bloomingdale Rd	No northbound exit
Rossville	3.7	6.0	4 (SB) 6 (NB)	Arthur Kill Rd / Huguenot Ave	
Greenridge	5.0	8.0	5	Muldoon Ave / Arden Ave	Southbound exit only
Fresh Kills	5.4	8.7	Bridge		
Travis	6.2	10.0	7	Victory Blvd	
Chelsea	7.1	11.4	8	South Ave	
Bloomfield	7.8	12.6	9	Glen St	Northbound exit only; opened in 2001
Bloomfield	9.2	14.8	10	I-278 west – Goethals Br, Newark Airport	Southern end of the concurrency with I-278; exit number not signed northbound; serves Howland Hook Marine Terminal
Bloomfield	9.22	14.84	6	South Ave	Southbound exit only
Bulls Head–Graniteville line	9.5	15.3	7	Richmond Ave	
Bulls Head–Graniteville line	10.1– 10.3	16.3– 16.6	8 (NB) 11 (SB)	Victory Blvd	Former NY 439A
Bulls Head–Graniteville line	10.1– 10.3	16.3– 16.6	10E	I-278 east – Verrazzano Br, Brooklyn	Northern end of the concurrency with I-278
Mariners Harbor–Port Richmond line	11.3	18.2	12	Forest Ave	Former NY 439
Mariners Harbor–Port Richmond line	12.0	19.3	13	Richmond Ter (NB) Morningstar Rd / Richmond Ter (SB)	Morningstar Road not signed northbound
Kill Van Kull	12.7	20.4	Bayonne Bridge (southbound toll; E-ZPass or pay-by-plate)		
Kill Van Kull	12.7	20.4		Route 440 north – Jersey City	Continuation into New Jersey
1.000 mi = 1.609 km; 1.000 km = 0.621 mi: Concurrency terminus; Electronic toll collection; Incomplete access
