= South Richmond High School =

Public school in New York City

Coordinates: 40°30′38″N 74°13′4″W

Address
- 6581 Hylan Boulevard, Staten Island, New York, 11223; United States

Information
- Type: Public high school
- Established: 1958
- School district: 75
- Principal: Anthony Casella
- Grades: kindergarten-12
- Website: p25r.org

South Richmond High School is a public special education school located in Staten Island, New York, USA, under the jurisdiction of the New York City Department of Education. The school serves students ages 10-21. The current principal is Anthony Casella. The main school location is in Pleasant Plains, while an annex is located in the former P.S. 4 building in Charleston. The school operates 22 sites throughout Staten Island.

The school, a part of NYCDOE District 75, has nine classes of students. Its curriculum includes education subjects and subjects on daily life skills. Activities in the daily life skills coursework include cleaning, cooking, visiting libraries, and shopping.
