= Arden Heights, Staten Island =

Neighborhood in New York City

Coordinates: 40°33′17″N 74°10′48″W

Arden Heights is a name increasingly applied to the western part of Annadale, a neighborhood located on the South Shore of Staten Island, New York City, US. The name "Arden Heights" is found on most maps of New York City, including Hagstrom's.

Arden Heights is bordered by Annadale to the east, Huguenot to the south, the Arthur Kill to the west, and the Fresh Kills to the north.

== History ==
Erastus Wiman, a noted Staten Island real estate developer, coined the name "Arden Heights" in 1886; the neighborhood's name probably refers to the hill that currently looms above the Village Greens shopping center and housing development. (The moniker does not refer to the now-shuttered Fresh Kills Landfill, at the western end of Arden Avenue. The landfill did not exist until the mid-20th century.)

Long noted for being the site of St. Michael's Home For Children, a Roman Catholic orphanage, Arden Heights underwent a serious transformation when the aforementioned Village Greens, New York City's first planned urban development, opened there in 1971. Ground was broken for the project by Mayor John V. Lindsay, who in the late 1960s proudly announced that travel time from the Greens to Lower Manhattan would average one hour 15 minutes – just about the same when taking a bus in 2007.

In 1982, the Saint Michael's orphanage, situated off Arthur Kill Road, closed, with some land on which it stood being sold to developers (who have since built the Aspen Knolls development) and the remainder set aside for use as a church, named for the recently canonized St. John Neumann. The church also maintains a convent for the Presentation Sisters on the east side of the property; in 2005 a section of this land was sold off, with new home construction to follow here too — still another sign of the continuing housing boom on Staten Island, which has gone on virtually uninterrupted since the Verrazzano–Narrows Bridge opened in 1964.

== Demographics ==
For census purposes, the New York City Department of City Planning classifies Arden Heights as part of a larger Neighborhood Tabulation Area called Arden Heights-Rossville SI0303. This designated neighborhood had 30,683 inhabitants based on data from the 2020 United States Census. This was an increase of 767 persons (2.6%) from the 29,916 counted in 2010. The neighborhood had a population density of 19.8 inhabitants per acre (14,500/sq mi; 5,600/km^{2}).

The racial makeup of the neighborhood was 73.7% (22,611) White (Non-Hispanic), 1.5% (457) Black (Non-Hispanic), 9.6% (2,934) Asian, and 1.9% (587) from two or more races. Hispanic or Latino of any race were 12.9% (3,945) of the population.

According to the 2020 United States Census, this area has many cultural communities of over 1,000 inhabitants. This include residents who identify as Puerto Rican, German, Irish, Italian, Russian, Egyptian, and Chinese. 15.3% of the residents were foreign born.

Most inhabitants are higher-aged adults: 40.7% are between 40-64 years old. 75.2% of the households had at least one family present. Out of the 10,773 households, 56.2% had a married couple (24.0% with a child under 18), 4.2% had a cohabiting couple (1.4% with a child under 18), 14.0% had a single male (1.2% with a child under 18), and 25.6% had a single female (4.1% with a child under 18). 34.3% of households had children. In this neighborhood, 18.6% of non-vacant housing units are renter-occupied.

== Village Greens ==
The Greens feature clustered townhomes built around looped streets – one way in, one way out. Off the main thoroughfares of Arden Avenue and Arthur Kill Road, these streets – Hampton Green, Forest Green, Dover Green, Avon Green, and Carlyle Green – provides a relatively traffic-free environment, making Village Greens a unique place to live in an otherwise overdeveloped Staten Island. (Some Greens feature detached homes, which naturally fetch a higher market price than the townhomes, which are often clustered eight apiece.) Architectural guidelines and exterior home inspections by the Village Greens Homeowners Association have helped the community maintain its appearance.

Another "Green" – namely Rolling Hill Green – was built on land intended for the Village Greens but, for reasons unknown (some conjecture that the developers ran out of cash and construction workers) were never built. These "Greens" have their own recreational facilities.

A shopping center was simultaneously developed to serve the residents of Village Greens, as well as a New York City public elementary school; Village Greens also features a 16-acre (65,000 m^{2}) common park, featuring expanses of green grass, trees and – most astonishingly – two Olympic-sized swimming pools; all maintained through Village Greens Homeowners Association's relatively low common charges. Today, the project stands at the center of a community bearing its own identity, separate from that of Annadale.

A large percentage of the residents of the development — and the many single-family homes that have since been built around it — are Jewish and Italian, giving Arden Heights more common ground with such Mid-Island neighborhoods as Willowbrook than with Annadale and other South Shore communities. The area also has a small Asian & Hispanic population that is more similar to Mid-Island neighborhoods than other South Shore neighborhoods.

About a mile north of the "Greens" is the Aspen Knolls development, located off Arthur Kill Road, next to the St. John Neumann Church. Plans for this development began in the early 1990s and were originally meant for housing of Navy families. However, due to Base Realignment and Closure, the housing contract was terminated in November 1994 after the closure of the Staten Island Homeport in Stapleton. With the development already planned, the developer opted to market the one, two, and three bedroom homes to the public. Construction began in 1995 and was finished in early 2006. During this time period, people moved into the community as each house was finished being built. The complex includes playing fields and a community center.

== Transportation ==
Arden Heights is served by the S74 and S84 local buses along Arthur Kill Road, the S56 along Arden Avenue and Arthur Kill Road, and the S55 along Annadale Road. It is also served by express buses to Manhattan, including the SIM2 and SIM23 along Arden Avenue and Arthur Kill Road, the SIM22 along Arthur Kill Road, and the SIM8 along Woodrow Road and Arthur Kill Road.

Arden Heights does not have a station on the Staten Island Railway, but it can be reached at the Annadale station via the S55 bus.

== Education ==
Arden Heights is served by the I.S.75 intermediate school. www.IS75.org

== Public libraries ==
New York Public Library operates the Huguenot Park Branch, which serves Arden Heights and other neighborhoods, at 830 Huguenot Avenue at Drumgoole Road East. The branch opened in January 1985.

== Notable residents ==
- Jason Marquis – Washington Nationals All Star starting pitcher; though born in Manhasset, New York, he was raised in Arden Heights and attended Tottenville High School, whose baseball team he pitched to two New York City championships.
