= Pleasant Plains, Staten Island =

Neighborhood in New York City

Coordinates: 40°31′26″N 74°12′56″W

Pleasant Plains is a neighborhood located on Staten Island, New York City, New York. It is bordered by Woodrow to the north, the Lower New York Bay to the south, Richmond Valley to the west, and Prince's Bay to the east. The neighborhood is represented in the New York City Council by Joe Borelli.

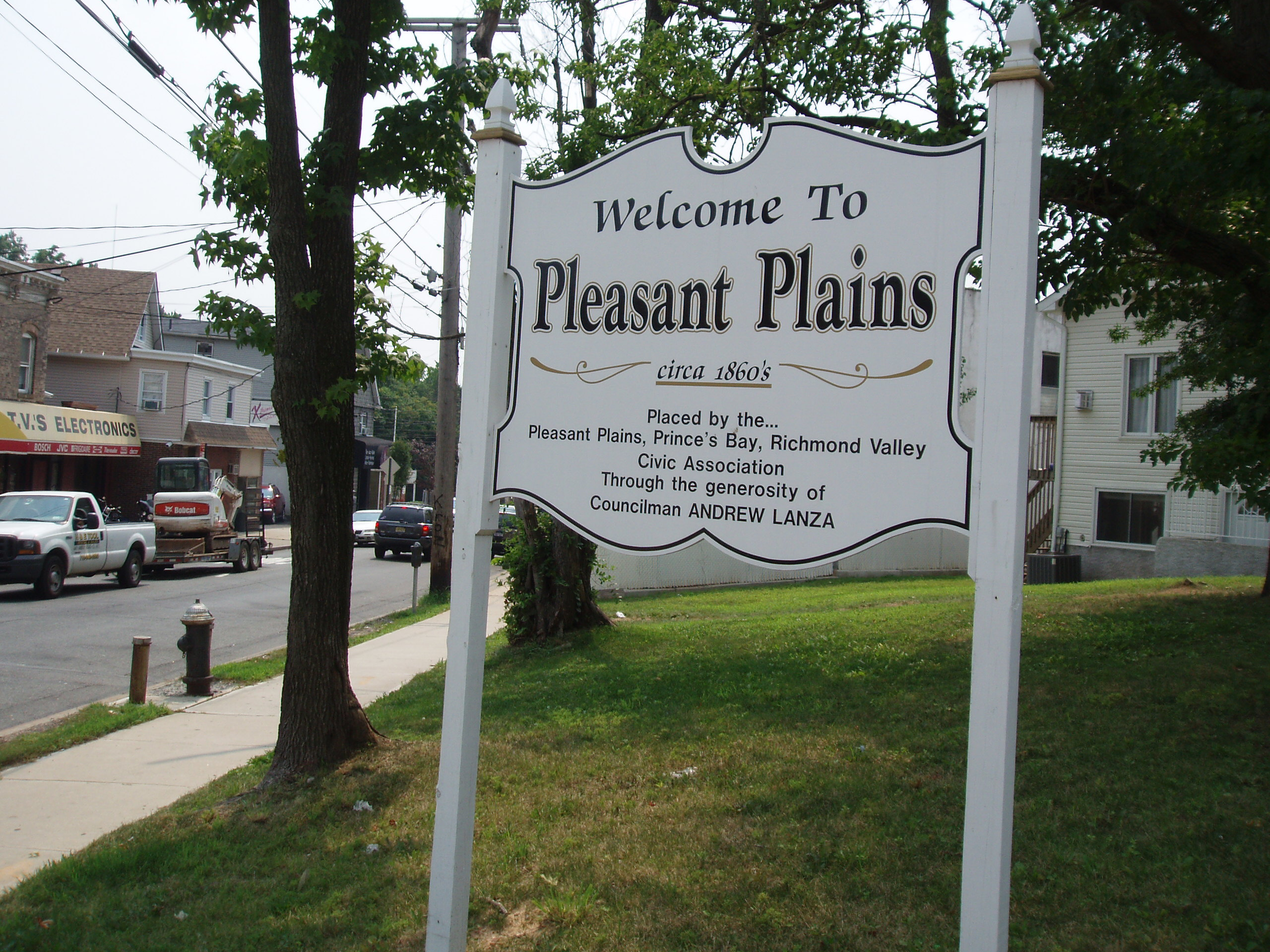
"Welcome To Pleasant Plains" sign (Amboy Rd. Facing south, corner of Pleasant Plains Ave.; August 2007).

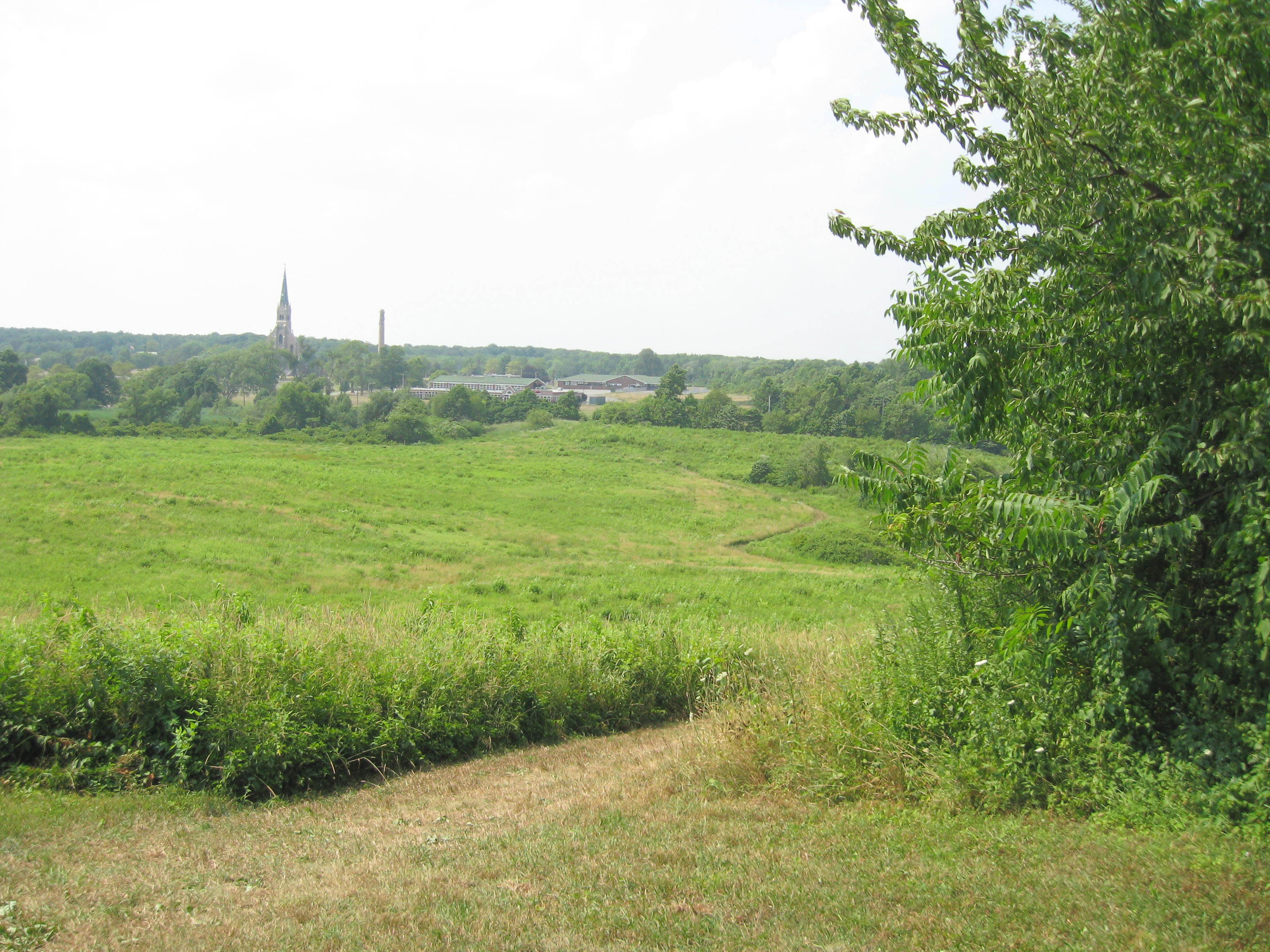
View looking north across Mount Loretto Unique Area with church in distance (July 2008).

Situated on the island's South Shore, Pleasant Plains has a population of 5,000 according to the 2000 census. It was named by officials of the Staten Island Railroad Corporation, the original owners of what is now known as the MTA Staten Island Railway. When the railroad line was extended to Tottenville in 1860, a station crossing Amboy Road approximately two miles north of Tottenville was named Pleasant Plains. Eventually, the name "Pleasant Plains" was applied to the community which soon sprung up around the station.

== History ==
In 1882, a 120-acre (0.49 km^{2}) farm southeast of the railroad station was purchased from the Bennett family by the Reverend John Christopher Drumgoole, founder of the Mission of the Immaculate Virgin. He started the mission in Manhattan in 1871 originally to aid homeless newsboys. Subsequent parcels were added for a combined area of 400 acres (1.6 km^{2}). The formal name became The Mission of The Immaculate Virgin at Mount Loretto but was and still is referred to solely as "Mt. Loretto". An orphanage for boys and a working farm was established on the site. At one time it was the largest farm in New York State. In 1888, Father Drumgooles successor began construction on St. Elizabeth's Building, a six-story Georgian Style building to be used as a girls' orphanage with a capacity of 350 children. It was destroyed by fire in March 2000 as a result of arson. The building had been abandoned and neglected for a number of years.

A 194-acre (0.79 km^{2}) parcel of land south of Hylan Blvd. was sold to The State of New York. The park named, "The Mount Loretto Unique Area" is maintained by the New York State Dept. of Environmental Conservation. The state park adjoins Lemon Creek Park, which is partially in Pleasant Plains. The Pleasant Plains' portion includes a fishing pier at the foot of Sharrotts Ave.

The park contains 85 ft (26 m). high red clay bluffs overlooking Prince’s Bay, part Outer New York Harbor, they are part of the terminal moraine the southern terminus of the Wisconsin Glacier which receded 10,000 yrs. ago. They are the tallest ocean-facing bluffs in New York State. On the highest section of these bluffs The Prince's Bay Lighthouse was built in 1864. The lighthouse has attached living quarters.

In 1978, 126 acres (510,000 m^{2}) on the north side of the property were converted into the Cemetery of the Resurrection by the church's Archdiocese of New York, which needed to open a new cemetery on Staten Island as most of the burial plots at the island's existing Catholic cemeteries had already been used.

In 1973, the Church of St. Joachim and St. Anne was destroyed by fire. The exterior of this church was used in the baptism scene from The Godfather the year before.

In 2004 a 12-acre (49,000 m^{2}) tract at the northeastern corner of the mission's property, which had been the site of a convent maintained by the Handmaids of the Most Pure Heart of Mary, a Franciscan order of nuns, was sold to residential developers for US$19 million, despite steadfast opposition from local conservation activists. Part of the mission property became the Mount Loretto Unique Area.

The commercial core of this community centers around the intersection of Bloomingdale Road, Amboy Road and Pleasant Plains Avenue. Like many of the South Shore's old commercial cores, it is experiencing a mild, yet noticeable rebirth.

== Transportation ==
Pleasant Plains is served by the Staten Island Railway station of the same name near Amboy Road/Bloomingdale Road. It is served by the S55 local bus on Amboy Road and Bloomingdale Road. Express bus service to and from Manhattan is provided by the SIM26 on Amboy Road and Bloomingdale Road.

== Education ==
The New York City Department of Education operates public schools.

Public school students living in Pleasant Plains are zoned for Tottenville High School, which is located in the Huguenot neighborhood of Staten Island. Private school options include Staten Island Academy, a non-religious private school serving grades pre-k3 to 12th grade. Additionally there are numerous Catholic school options such as Saint Joseph By the Sea High School, a co-educational school, Monsignor Farrell High School, an all-boys school, and Notre Dame Academy, which is an all-girls school with an elementary school and High school.

The main campus of South Richmond High School, a special education school, is in Pleasant Plains.
