= Totten Intermediate School 34 =

School in New York, United States

Coordinates: 40.508079°N 74.243322°W

Totten Intermediate School 34, also known as I.S.34, is a Junior High School located in Tottenville, Staten Island, New York. This school serves grades 6–8. This school's building was formerly Tottenville High School from 1936 until 1972 when Tottenville High School was relocated to Huguenot, Staten Island. The building has been renamed "Totten" and has three floors and a basement. The school has a library, two STEM labs, a boys' gym, a girls' gym, and various classrooms. The school also has an honors program. Totten Intermediate School 34 is located in New York City Public School District 31.

== Administration ==
- John Boyle, principal, all grades (2013–present)
- Gary Tames, assistant principal, 8th grade (2022–present)
- Amy Janicke, assistant principal, 7th grade (2022–present)
- Tammy Stancavage, assistant principal, 6th grade (2022–present)
- Ashley Bulko, assistant principal, special education (2013–present)
- Michelle Van Pelt, Christopher Mancusi, deans, 8th grade (2022–present)
- Christopher Mancusi, dean, 7th grade (2022–present)
- Michelle Van Pelt, dean, 6th grade (2022–present)

== Learning standards ==
ELA: Totten Intermediate School 34 follows the ELA Common Core Learning Standards

MATH: Totten Intermediate School 34 follows the Math Common Core Learning Standards

== Extracurricular activities ==
Student government: Consists of class representatives, 6th grade president, 7th grade president, 8th grade president

Student advisory committee: ELA and Math representatives gather to discuss Common Core Learning

Roundabout Theater: After-School Drama Program
