= Sie =

Sie or SIE may refer to:

== People ==
- Donald-Olivier Sié (born 1970), footballer
- James Sie (born 1962), voice actor
- John J. Sie, businessman
- Trish Sie, choreographer and director

== Language ==
- Sie language, spoken in Vanuatu
- Simaa language, spoken in Zambia
- "Sie", proposed gender-neutral pronoun
- "Sie", one of the pronouns in German

== Military and government ==
- Army Intelligence Service (Spanish: Servicio de Inteligencia del Ejército), Argentina
- Foreign Intelligence Service (Romania) (Romanian: Serviciul de Informaţii Externe)
- Special Intervention Squadron (Dutch Speciaal Interventie Eskadron), now the Belgian Federal Police Special Units

== Transportation ==
- Sherburn-in-Elmet railway station, in England
- Staten Island Expressway, in Staten Island, New York City, US

== Video gaming ==
- Sie Kensou, a character in The King of Fighters
- Sony Interactive Entertainment, multinational video game and digital entertainment company

== Other uses ==
- SIE (file format), for accounting data
- Society of Industrial Engineering, a student society
- Specific ion electrode

== See also ==
- Sia (disambiguation)
- Xie (disambiguation)
