= Brighton Heights =

Brighton Heights may refer to either of two neighborhoods in the United States:

- Brighton Heights (Pittsburgh), Pittsburgh, Pennsylvania
- Brighton Heights, Staten Island, Staten Island, New York
