= Xié River =

The Xié River may refer to either:

- Xie River (Brazil)
- Xie River (Chinese: 斜川, Xié Chuān) in China

== See also ==
- Xie (disambiguation)
