= Brighton Heights, Staten Island =

Neighborhood in New York City

Coordinates: 40.641°N 74.080°W

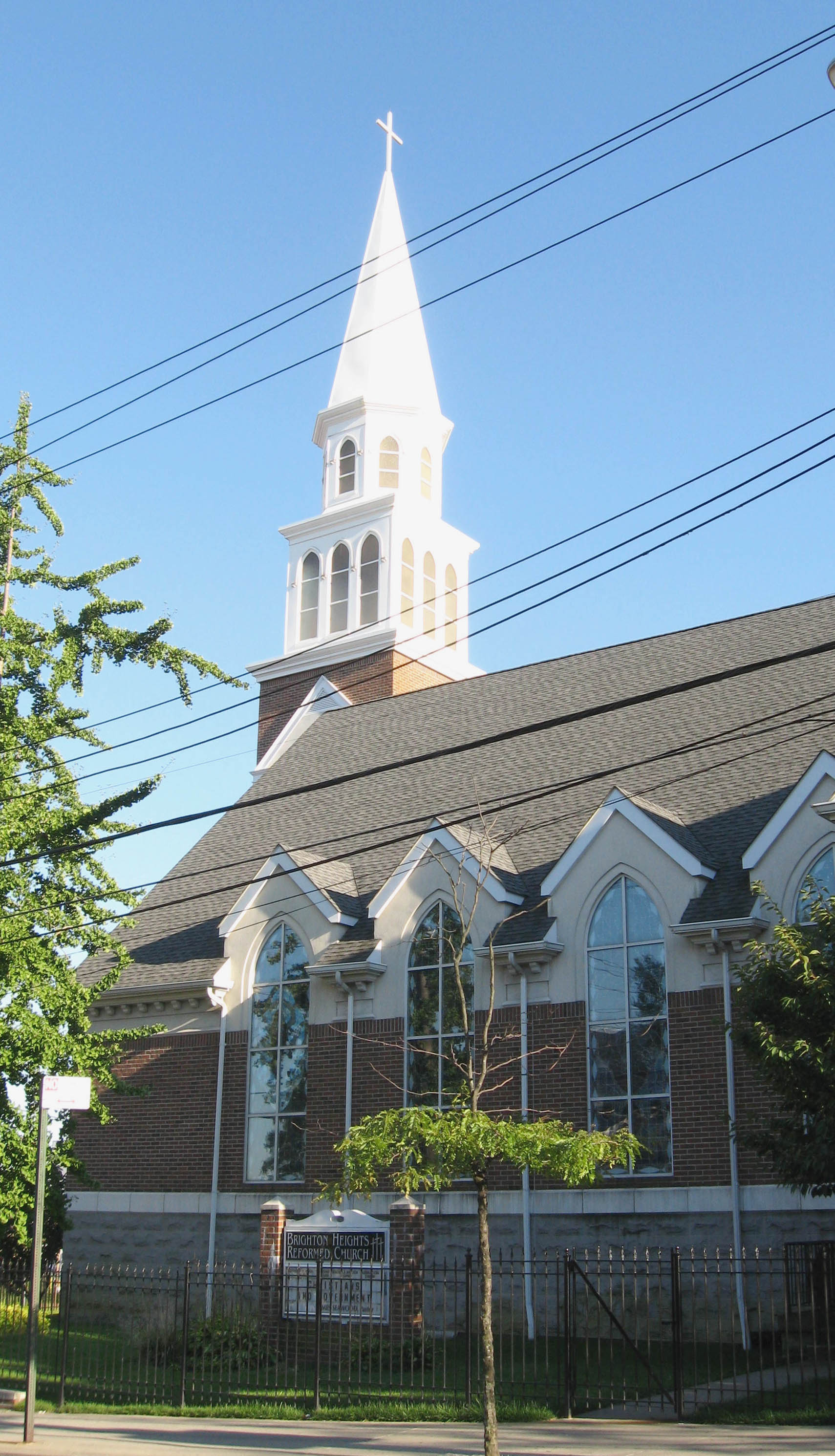
Brighton Heights Reformed Church

Brighton Heights is a neighborhood in New York City's borough of Staten Island.

Silver Lake borders Brighton Heights on the south; however the name "Silver Lake" is applied to the community on the other side of the lake, which is actually a reservoir created in 1917. The word "Heights" denotes the steep hill that rises from Tompkinsville to the east. Victory Boulevard climbs this hill, and as a result the hill itself is often called Victory Hill. Stapleton Heights is on the other side of Victory Hill from Brighton Heights, and north of Brighton Heights is St. George, the island's "downtown" section.

The northern section of Brighton Heights is sometimes referred to as Fort Hill, after a street located therein named Fort Hill Circle. There is also a Fort Hill Park.

Brighton Heights is part of Staten Island Community District 1 and has many large, older homes.

== Demographics ==
For census purposes, the New York City Department of City Planning classifies Brighton Heights as part of a larger Neighborhood Tabulation Area called St. George-New Brighton SI0101. This designated neighborhood had 20,549 inhabitants based on data from the 2020 United States Census. This was an increase of 1,775 persons (9.5%) from the 18,774 counted in 2010. The neighborhood had a population density of 33.0 inhabitants per acre (14,500/sq mi; 5,600/km^{2}).

The racial makeup of the neighborhood was 21.4% (4,394) White (Non-Hispanic), 31.9% (6,561) Black (Non-Hispanic), 7.2% (1,471) Asian, and 5.3% (1,074) from two or more races. Hispanic or Latino of any race were 34.3% (7,049) of the population.

According to the 2020 United States Census, this area has many cultural communities of over 1,000 inhabitants. This include residents who identify as Mexican, Puerto Rican, Irish, Italian, and African-American.

The largest age group was people 25-39 years old, which made up 22% of the residents. 59.6% of the households had at least one family present. Out of the 7,732 households, 27.8% had a married couple (10.8% with a child under 18), 6.6% had a cohabiting couple (2.3% with a child under 18), 24.7% had a single male (2% with a child under 18), and 40.9% had a single female (11.3% with a child under 18). 31.1% of households had children under 18. In this neighborhood, 70.2% of non-vacant housing units are renter-occupied.

The entirety of Community District 1, which comprises Brighton Heights and other neighborhoods on the North Shore, had 181,484 inhabitants as of NYC Health's 2018 Community Health Profile, with an average life expectancy of 79.0 years. This is lower than the median life expectancy of 81.2 for all New York City neighborhoods. Most inhabitants are youth and middle-aged adults: 24% are between the ages of between 0–17, 27% between 25 and 44, and 26% between 45 and 64. The ratio of college-aged and elderly residents was lower, at 10% and 13% respectively.

As of 2017, the median household income in Community District 1 was $48,018, though the median income in Brighton Heights individually was $49,807. In 2018, an estimated 21% of Brighton Heights and the North Shore residents lived in poverty, compared to 17% in all of Staten Island and 20% in all of New York City. One in fourteen residents (7%) were unemployed, compared to 6% in Staten Island and 9% in New York City. Rent burden, or the percentage of residents who have difficulty paying their rent, is 51% in New Brighton and the North Shore, compared to the boroughwide and citywide rates of 49% and 51% respectively. Based on this calculation, as of 2018, Brighton Heights and the North Shore are considered high-income relative to the rest of the city and not gentrifying.

== Points of interest ==
Points of interest include a Jewish Community Center and the Brighton Heights Reformed Church (NRHP).

== Transportation ==
Brighton Heights is served by S42, S46, S48, S96 and S98 local bus routes and the SIM30 express bus.

== Sources ==
- "2016-2018 Community Health Assessment and Community Health Improvement Plan: Take Care New York 2020" (PDF). New York City Department of Health and Mental Hygiene. n.d. Archived from the original (PDF) on September 9, 2017.
- "St. George and Stapleton (Including Grymes Hill, Mariner's Harbor, Port Richmond, Stapleton, St. George, West Brighton and Westerleigh)" (PDF). Community Health Profiles. New York City Department of Health and Mental Hygiene. 2018.
