= S48 and S98 buses =

Bus routes in Staten Island, New York

s48 s98
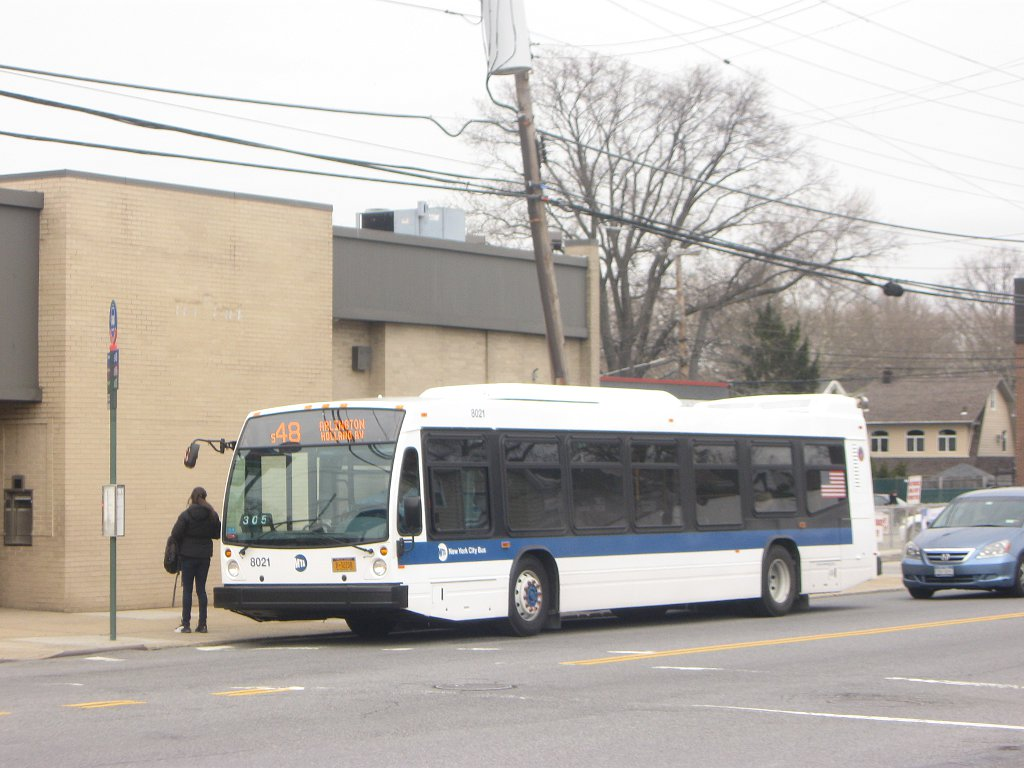
- A 2011 Nova Bus LFS (8021) on the Arlington-bound S48 at Bard Avenue.

Overview
- System: MTA Regional Bus Operations
- Operator: New York City Transit Authority
- Garage: Castleton Depot
- Vehicle: Orion VII EPA10; Nova Bus LFS
- Began service: April 2, 1989 (S48); March 15, 1995 (S98)

Route
- Locale: Staten Island
- Communities served: St. George, Tompkinsville, New Brighton, West New Brighton, Port Richmond, Mariners Harbor, Arlington
- Start: St. George Ferry Terminal
- Via: Victory Boulevard, Forest Avenue
- End: Arlington – Holland Avenue and Richmond Terrace
- Length: 6.8 miles (10.9 km)
- Other routes: SIM30 Sunnyside/Rosebank/Forest Avenue/Midtown

Service
- Operates: 24 hours (S48); Rush hours (S98)
- Annual patronage: 940,978 (2025)
- Transfers: Yes
- Timetable: S48 S98

The S48 and S98 constitutes two bus routes in Staten Island, New York, running primarily on Victory Boulevard and Forest Avenue, between St. George Ferry Terminal and Arlington. It is operated by the New York City Transit Authority.

The S48 was originally the R107 bus route, and was renumbered to S107, then the S48 in 1989. The S98 was created in 1995 as a limited stop variant of the S48.

== Route description and service ==
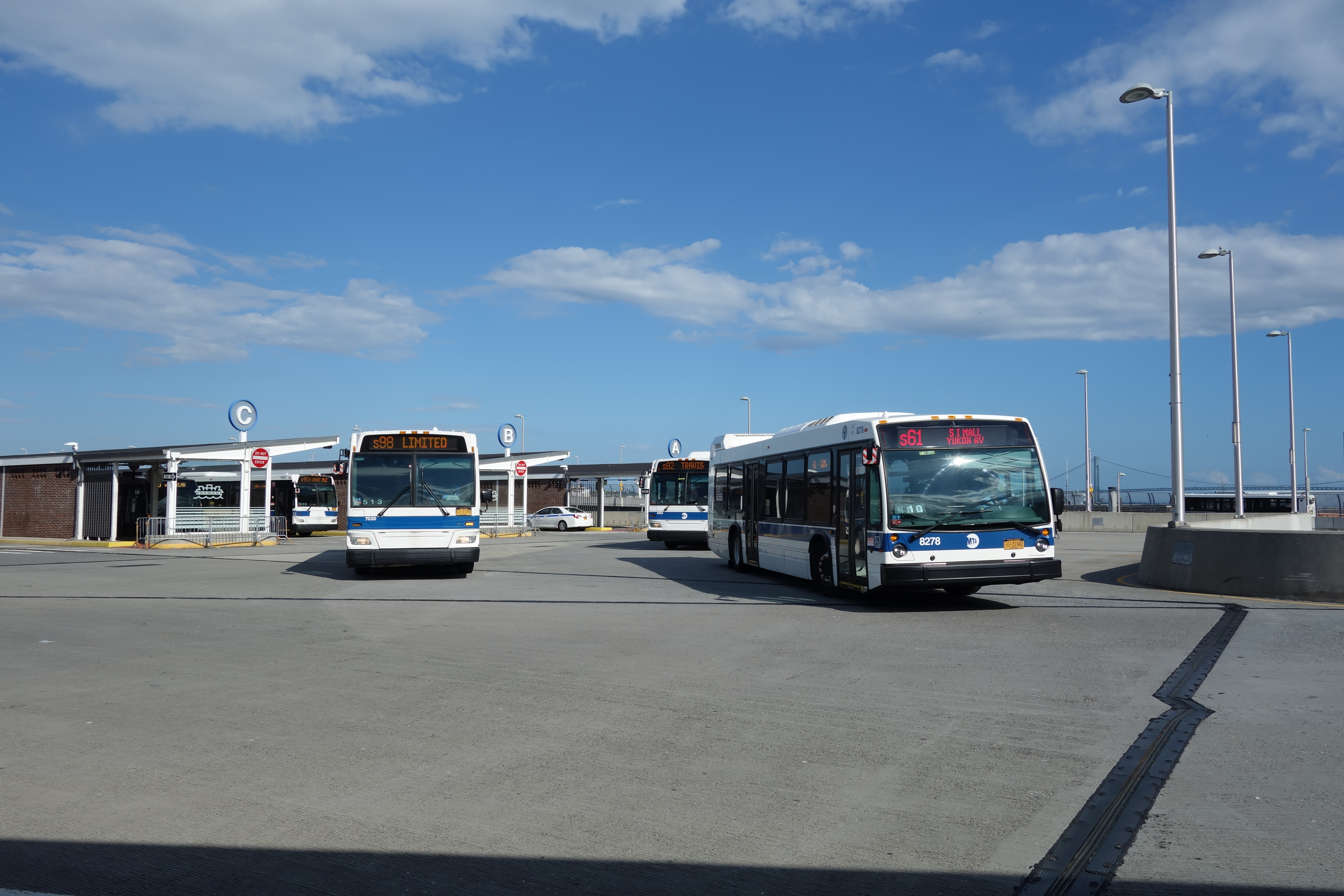
A 2011 Orion VII EPA10 “3G” (7020) on the Arlington-bound S98 Limited leaving St. George Ferry Terminal, alongside other buses

The S48 begins at the St. George Ferry Terminal at Ramp C, and continues along Bay Street until it goes on Victory Boulevard. It goes on the boulevard for a length until it turns to Forest Avenue. It then continues on Forest Avenue until it turns to South Avenue, and uses Arlington Place to access the terminus. Buses heading eastbound use Holland Avenue and Richmond Terrance to access South Avenue. Some buses terminate or start at Richmond Avenue during rush hours in the peak direction.

During rush hours, the S98 replicates the S48, running to St. George Ferry Terminal during AM rush hours and Arlington during PM rush hours. Buses make all local stops west of Richmond Avenue.

=== School trippers ===
When school is in session, two buses to Arlington depart I.S. 051 Edwin Markham at 2:35pm, heading to Forest Avenue via Houston Street and Willow Road. An extra 2pm trip to Arlington originates at Broadway near Anning S. Prall I.S. 27. One westbound trip also originates at Oxford Place near Notre Dame Academy at 2:55pm, but terminates at Forest Promenade Shopping Plaza at Richmond Avenue.

== History ==
The S48 was originally the R107 route, which ran between St. George Ferry Ramp "C", and Mariner's Harbor or Port Ivory. It was initially operated by the Staten Island Coach Company, then the Isle Transportation Company.

In 1947, Isle Transportation went bankrupt, and the New York City Board of Transportation took over its routes, including the R107, on February 23 of the same year.

The R107 was renumbered the S107, then the S48 on April 2, 1989. On that date, the hours of service to Holland Avenue and Richmond Terrace were extended, with some trips now running to Howland Hook to serve works in Port Ivory, taking over the western terminal of the S1, then renumbered the S40.

On March 15, 1995, NYCT announced plans to truncate service from Howland Hook to Arlington Place and South Avenue in Mariners Harbor. On the same day, the S98 service began as a limited stop variant of the S48. Service to St. George initially ran between 7:00 a.m. and 8:30 a.m. and service from St. George initially ran between 5:00 p.m. and 6:30 p.m.. S98 trips were implemented by converting some existing local trips to provide passengers traveling longer distances with quicker trips to and from St. George.
