= Major's =

Former department store in New York City, United States

Major's was a large-format discount department store at Forest and Grandview avenues on Staten Island. Its logo featured a distinctive drum major.
