= New York State Route 439 =

Former state highway in New York State

New York State Route 439
- Map of Staten Island with NY 439 highlighted in red

Route information
- Maintained by NYSDOT
- Length: 7.44 mi (11.97 km)
- Existed: 1949–c. 1968

Major junctions
- West end: Route 439 at the New Jersey state line
- East end: Staten Island Ferry landing in St. George

Location
- Country: United States
- State: New York
- Counties: Richmond

Highway system
- New York Highways; Interstate; US; State; Reference; Parkways
← NY 438	→ NY 439A

New York State Route 439 (NY 439) was an east–west state highway on Staten Island in New York in the United States. The western terminus of the route was at the Goethals Bridge, where it continued into New Jersey as its Route 439. Its eastern terminus was at the Staten Island Ferry terminal in the St. George neighborhood. In between, NY 439 followed the Staten Island Expressway, Forest Avenue, Victory Boulevard, and Bay Street.

When NY 439 was assigned in 1949, it extended eastward into Brooklyn by way of the Bay Ridge Ferry. In Brooklyn, the NY 439 designation continued along Bay Ridge Avenue (69th Street), 4th Avenue and Shore Road Drive to exit 1 of the Belt Parkway, where it ended. In 1964, the Verrazzano–Narrows Bridge between Brooklyn and Staten Island was completed, resulting in the deactivation of the Bay Ridge Ferry and the truncation of NY 439 to the St. George ferry terminal. NY 439 ceased to exist entirely c. 1968. Although the number was removed in New York, it had carried over to New Jersey and still exists today in Elizabeth, New Jersey, as Route 439.

== Route description ==
NY 439 began at the Goethals Bridge on Staten Island, where it continued into New Jersey as its Route 439. It headed southeast on what is now the Staten Island Expressway, passing through a largely undeveloped area of the island. At Forest Avenue, NY 439 turned to follow Forest Avenue eastward toward the neighborhood of Graniteville. In Graniteville, the route intersected Richmond Avenue, at the time part of NY 440.

The route continued on, passing through densely populated areas of northern Staten Island as it proceeded eastward. In Silver Lake, NY 439 intersected Victory Boulevard, here designated as NY 439A. At this point, NY 439A ended and NY 439 turned northeastward onto Victory Boulevard. The route remained on the roadway up to a junction with Bay Street near St. George. Here, NY 439 curved northward to follow Bay Street north to St. George. The route ended at the Staten Island Ferry terminal connecting Staten Island to Manhattan.

== History ==
NY 439 was assigned in 1949 as an eastward continuation of New Jersey Route 28 (later Route 439) across the Goethals Bridge and Staten Island. The route began at the Goethals Bridge and, as it did for the entirety of its existence, followed Forest Avenue, Victory Boulevard, and Bay Street to the Staten Island Ferry terminal in St. George. At the time, it continued across The Narrows to Brooklyn by way of the Bay Ridge Ferry. Once in Brooklyn, it was routed on Bay Ridge Avenue (69th Street), 4th Avenue, and Shore Road Drive. The designation ended at exit 1 of the Belt Parkway. NY 439 was also the planned number for the proposed North Shore Expressway across Staten Island's North Shore; however, the highway was never constructed.

In 1964, the Verrazzano–Narrows Bridge linking Staten Island to Brooklyn was completed. As a result, the Bay Ridge Ferry was shut down and NY 439 was truncated to the St. George ferry terminal. The NY 439 designation was removed entirely c. 1968. It was physically replaced by Interstate 278 in the vicinity of the Goethals Bridge and replaced in purpose by I-278 across the remainder of the island. Some signage for NY 439 remained posted on the road until the late 1970s.

== NY 439A ==

NY 439A was a spur of NY 439 on Staten Island that connected NY 440 to NY 439 by way of Victory Boulevard. It was assigned in 1949 and removed c. 1968.

== Major intersections ==
The entire route was in the New York City borough of Staten Island.

Location	mi	km	Destinations	Notes
Port Ivory	0.00	0.00	Route 439 north	Continuation into New Jersey
Port Ivory	1.30	2.09	I-278 east	Temporary western terminus of I-278
Graniteville	2.62	4.22	NY 440 (Richmond Avenue)	
Silver Lake	6.20	9.98	NY 439A west (Victory Boulevard)	Eastern terminus of NY 439A
St. George	7.44	11.97	Staten Island Ferry landing	Eastern terminus; connection to Manhattan
1.000 mi = 1.609 km; 1.000 km = 0.621 mi

== See also ==
- Major's
