= Society of Industrial Engineering =

Academic organization in the Philippines

Junior Philippine Institute of Industrial Engineers - UPHSD Calamba
- Abbreviation: JPIIE
- Successor: Junior Philippine Institute of Industrial Engineers
- Formation: August 2002
- Type: academic organization
- Legal status: Organization
- Headquarters: UPHSD - Calamba
- Location: Paciano Rizal, Calamba, Laguna, Philippines
- Members: Bachelor of Science in Industrial engineering students of UPHSD - Calamba
- Current President: Jemma Clarisse Gavino
- Affiliations: Philippine Institute of Industrial Engineers

Junior Philippine Institute of Industrial Engineers or JPIIE (former name: Society of Industrial Engineering) is an academic organization based in University of Perpetual Help System DALTA - Calamba Campus exclusive for BS Industrial Engineering students, faculty and alumni of the said university. It is one of the seven student organizations under the College of Engineering of the university which includes MES (Mechanical Engineering Society) for BS Mechanical Engineering students and ACES (Association of Civil Engineering Students) for BS Civil Engineering among others. The organization is also a member of PIIE (Philippine Institute of Industrial Engineers), a premier organization of BS Industrial Engineering graduates and students, and IE professionals in the Philippines. Engr. Philip Ermita, PIE, ASEAN Engr. is the organization's adviser aside from being the Dean of College of Engineering in the university.

== History ==
The society was first recognized by the University and its former school director Mr. Rey Dalde in August 2002 with the efforts of its first student officers for AY 2002-2003 being headed by the former president, Ms. Maria Fe dela Cruz. The society's by-laws was written by Ms. Cherryl C. Marudo. According to the by-laws, the name of the organization is Society of Industrial Engineering Students (or SIES). But, for some reasons, it became locally known as SIE (without the second S which means Students) probably because its name structure has been compared to the university's College of Engineering. By the year 2016, the SIE renamed as the Junior Philippine Institute of Industrial Engineers or JPIIE.

== List of presidents of SIE ==
Academic year	Name
2002–03	Maria Fe Dela Cruz
2003–04	-
2004–05	-
2005–06	-
2006–07	-
2007–08	Mabel Opeña
2008–09	Abegail Silva
2009–10	Xella Marie Rañada
2010–11	Jonathan Ladra
2011–12	Karen Manahan
2012–13	Marga Ocampo
2013–14	Jhem Ray Virgo
2014–15	Phoebe Ann Joy Garcia
2015–16	Caroline Chamorro
2016–17	Jezza Cahende
2017–18	Harry Fabros
2018-19	Dannshynne Galang
2018-19	Jemma Clarisse Gavino
