= Victory Boulevard (Staten Island) =

Boulevard in Staten Island, New York

- Map of Staten Island with Victory Boulevard highlighted in red

Route information
- Maintained by NYCDOT
- Length: 8.06 mi (12.97 km) Former NY 439A: 4.42 miles (7.11 km)
- Existed: 1816–present

Major junctions
- West end: Arthur Kill shore in Travis
- NY 440 in Travis; I-278 / NY 440 in Willowbrook
- East end: Bay Street Landing in St. George

Location
- Country: United States
- State: New York
- Counties: Richmond

Highway system
- New York Highways; Interstate; US; State; Reference; Parkways
← NY 439	NY 439A	→ NY 440

Victory Boulevard is a major thoroughfare on Staten Island, New York City, measuring approximately 8.0 miles (12.87 km). It stretches from the West Shore community of Travis to the upper East Shore communities of St. George and Tompkinsville. In the late 1940s, the portion of Victory Boulevard between Richmond Avenue and Forest Avenue was designated as New York State Route 439A (NY 439A). The section between Forest Avenue and Bay Street became part of NY 439 at the same time. Both designations were removed in c. 1968.

== Route description ==
The street follows a path similar to the Staten Island Expressway, an integral Staten Island traffic route. Both roadways intersect Clove Road, Slosson Avenue, Todt Hill Road, Bradley Avenue, the Dr. Martin Luther King Jr. Expressway, Richmond Avenue and the West Shore Expressway, as well as each other. Forest Avenue, too, is intersected by both roads; however, these two intersections are on opposite sides of the island.

Victory Boulevard is the only street on Staten Island that meets three different expressways by way of interchanges. It is exit 7 for the West Shore Expressway, exit 10 for the Staten Island Expressway westbound (exit 8 eastbound), and exit 11 for the Dr. Martin Luther King Jr. Expressway.

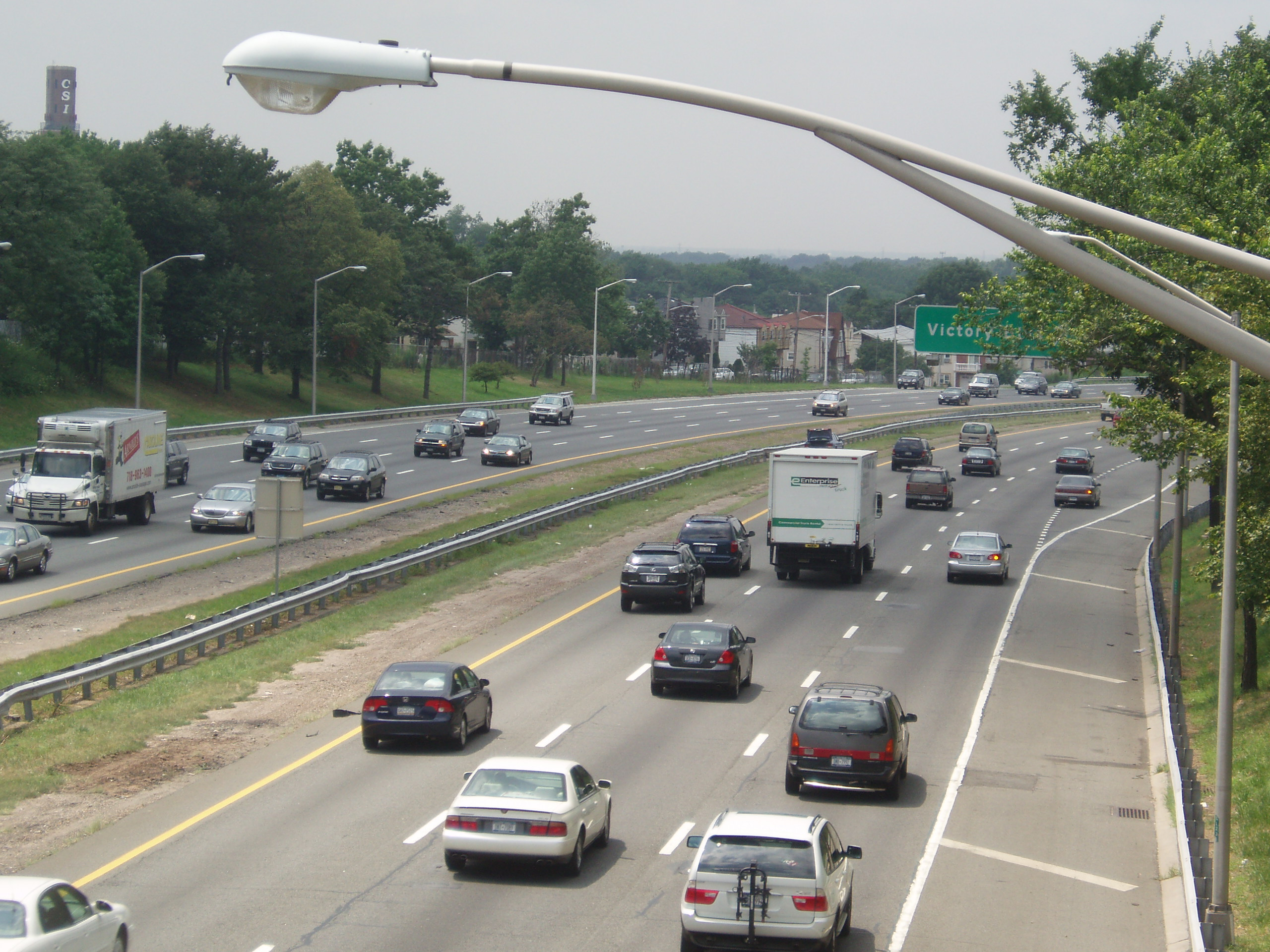
Victory Boulevard exit on the Staten Island Expressway

A number of prominent Staten Island sites and events are located along Victory Boulevard. Among these are the Travis Independence Day Parade, the Sylvan Grove Cemetery, the Mid-Island Little League field, and the College of Staten Island (CSI, formerly the Willowbrook State School). The Bulls' Head Tavern, a pub known for its Tory meetings during the American Revolution, also stood on Victory Boulevard, on the corner with Richmond Avenue. East of the Staten Island Railway mainline, the dead end at the eastern end of Victory Boulevard contains the Lyons Pool Recreation Center.

== History ==
Victory Boulevard was established in 1816 by the Richmond Turnpike Company as the Richmond Turnpike. The toll road was owned by Daniel D. Tompkins, a prominent Staten Islander who, a year later, became Vice President of the United States. The route was "promoted as the fastest...from New York to Philadelphia." Ferries from Manhattan and Brooklyn would dock at the eastern end of the turnpike, at Bay Street. Horse-drawn carriages would carry passengers to Travis, known at the time as Long Neck or the New Blazing Star Ferry, whence a ferry would carry people over the Arthur Kill to Woodbridge Township, New Jersey. From the 1860s to 1930, Travis was known as Linoleumville, the home of America's first Linoleum factory.

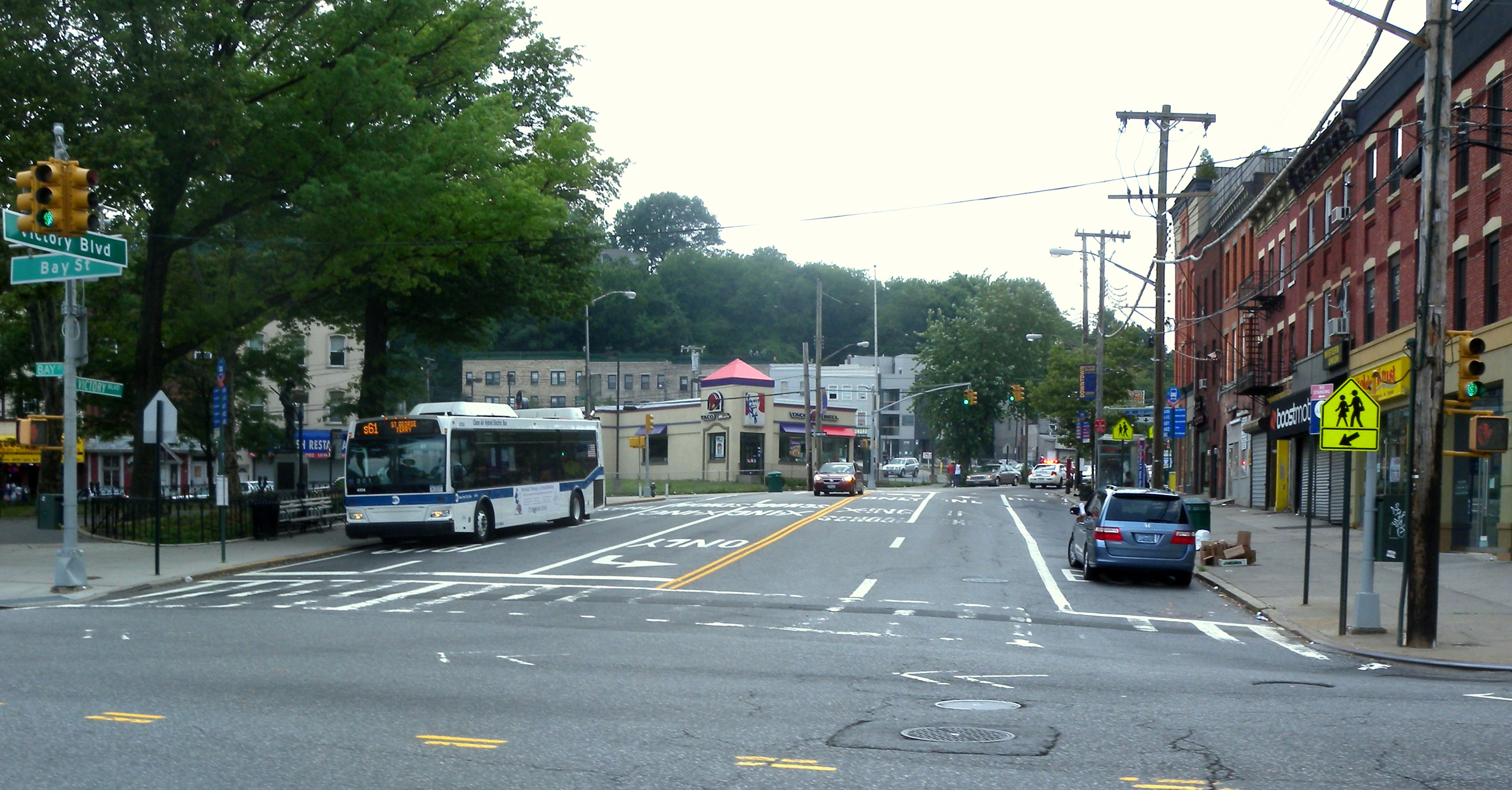
East end

After World War I, the Richmond Turnpike was renamed Victory Boulevard in honor of the allied victory. The segment of Victory Boulevard from Richmond Avenue (then-NY 440) in Bulls Head to Forest Avenue (then-NY 439) in Silver Lake was designated as NY 439A in the late 1940s. East of Forest Avenue, Victory Boulevard was designated as part of NY 439 down to Bay Street. Both designations were removed from Victory Boulevard c. 1968.

== Transportation ==
Victory Boulevard is served by the following bus routes:

- The S62 and S92 LTD are the primary servers, running alone the entire road west of Bay Street.
  - Additional buses running west of Bay include the Bricktown Mall-bound S78 until Saint Paul’s Avenue, the S46 and S96 until Jersey Street (West Shore Plaza) or Cebra Avenue (St. George Ferry), the S48 and S98 until Forest Avenue, and the S61 and S91 until Bradley Avenue.
- The S66 runs on two portions: between Bay Street and Highland Avenue, and between Clove Road and Jewett Avenue.
- The SIM32 express bus runs west of Gannon Avenue South (Manhattan) or Willowbrook Road (Travis), along with the SIM33 until Richmond Avenue, which goes to Mariners Harbor.
- From Forest Avenue, the SIM30 runs north to Cebra Avenue to serve Rosebank, or south to Clove Road where its Sunnyside terminal is.
- The S93 runs between Clove and Loop Roads.
- The SIM3 and SIM34 run between Slosson Avenue and either Bradley Avenue (Manhattan), or Watchogue Road (opposite terminals).

The Staten Island Railway has a station at the eastern end of the road.

== Major intersections ==
The entire route is in the New York City borough of Staten Island.

Location	mi	km	Destinations	Notes
Travis	0.00	0.00	Arthur Kill shore	Southern terminus
Travis	0.58	0.93	NY 440 (West Shore Expressway) – Outerbridge Crossing, Perth Amboy	Exit 7 on NY 440
Willowbrook	2.66	4.28	Richmond Avenue	Former NY 440
Willowbrook	3.31	5.33	I-278 (Staten Island Expressway) / NY 440 (Dr. Martin Luther King Jr. Expressway) – Goethals Bridge, Verrazano Bridge, Bayonne Bridge	Exits 8-10 on I-278; exit 11 on NY 440
Tompkinsville	7.08	11.39	Forest Avenue	Former NY 439
St. George	8.06	12.97	Bay Street	Northern terminus
1.000 mi = 1.609 km; 1.000 km = 0.621 mi
