= Interstate 278 =

Highway in New York City metropolitan area

Interstate 278
- Map of New York City with I-278 highlighted in red

Route information
- Auxiliary route of I-78
- Maintained by NJDOT, PANYNJ, NYSDOT, NYCDOT, and MTAB&T
- Length: 35.63 mi (57.34 km)
- Existed: 1961–present
- NHS: Entire route
- Restrictions: No drivers with learner's permits on Verrazzano & Triborough Bridges

Major junctions
- West end: US 1-9 in Linden, New Jersey
- I-95 Toll / N.J. Turnpike / Route 439 in Elizabeth, New Jersey; NY 440 from Bloomfield, New York to Bulls Head/Graniteville, New York; Belt Parkway in Bay Ridge, New York and Sunset Park, New York; NY 27 in Greenwood Heights, New York; I-478 Toll in Red Hook, New York; I-495 in Long Island City, New York; Grand Central Parkway in Astoria, New York; I-87 in Port Morris, New York; Bronx River Parkway in Soundview, New York
- East end: I-95 / I-295 / I-678 / Hutchinson River Parkway in Throggs Neck, New York

Location
- Country: United States
- States: New Jersey, New York
- Counties: New Jersey: Union; New York: Richmond, Kings, Queens, Manhattan, Bronx

Highway system
- Interstate Highway System; Main; Auxiliary; Suffixed; Business; Future
- New Jersey State Highway Routes; Interstate; US; State; Scenic Byways
- New York Highways; Interstate; US; State; Reference; Parkways
← Route 208	New Jersey	→ I-280
← NY 277	New York	→ NY 278

Interstate 278 (I-278) is an auxiliary Interstate Highway in New Jersey and New York in the United States. The road runs 35.62 miles (57.32 km) from US Route 1/9 (US 1/9) in Linden, New Jersey, northeast to the Bruckner Interchange in the New York City borough of the Bronx. The majority of I-278 is in New York City, where it serves as a partial beltway and passes through all five of the city's boroughs. (Note: It does not go through the island of Manhattan but does pass through Randalls and Wards Islands, which are part of the borough of Manhattan.) I-278 follows several freeways, including the Union Freeway in Union County, New Jersey; the Staten Island Expressway (SIE) across Staten Island; the Gowanus Expressway in southern Brooklyn; the Brooklyn–Queens Expressway (BQE) across Northern Brooklyn and Queens; a small part of the Grand Central Parkway in Queens; and a part of the Bruckner Expressway in the Bronx. I-278 also crosses multiple bridges, including the Goethals, Verrazzano–Narrows, Kosciuszko, and Robert F. Kennedy bridges.

I-278 was opened in pieces from the 1930s through the 1960s. Some of its completed segments predated the Interstate Highway System and are thus not up to standards, and portions of I-278 have been upgraded over the years. In New York, the various parts of I-278 were planned by Robert Moses, an urban planner in New York City. The segments proposed tore through many New York City neighborhoods, causing controversy. Despite its number, I-278 does not connect to I-78. There were once plans to extend I-278 west to I-78 east of the Route 24 interchange in Springfield, New Jersey. This was canceled because of opposition from the communities along the route. The segment that does exist in New Jersey was opened in 1969. There were also plans to extend I-78 east across Manhattan and into Brooklyn via the Williamsburg Bridge; this would have been a second interchange between I-278 and its parent highway, but these plans were also thwarted. I-78 was also planned to extend east beyond I-278 to John F. Kennedy International Airport, and then curve northward on the Clearview Expressway, ending at the Bruckner Interchange in the Bronx. If these plans were fully completed, I-78 and I-278 would have met at three interchanges.

Two segments of I-278 have had different route number designations formerly planned or designated for it. I-87 was once planned to follow the segment of I-278 between the Williamsburg Bridge and the Major Deegan Expressway, but this ultimately became a part of I-278. Additionally, the Bruckner Expressway portion of I-278 had been designated with different route numbers. At first, it was to be I-895 between I-87 and the Sheridan Expressway and I-678 past there. Later, I-278 was planned to follow the Bruckner Expressway and the Sheridan Expressway to I-95 (with no route number for the Bruckner Expressway past there) before the current numbering took place by 1970, with I-895 designated onto the Sheridan Expressway (which was subsequently downgraded to a state highway in 2017).

== Route description ==
Lengths
	mi	km
NJ	2.00	3.22
NY	33.62	54.11
Total	35.62	57.32

=== New Jersey ===
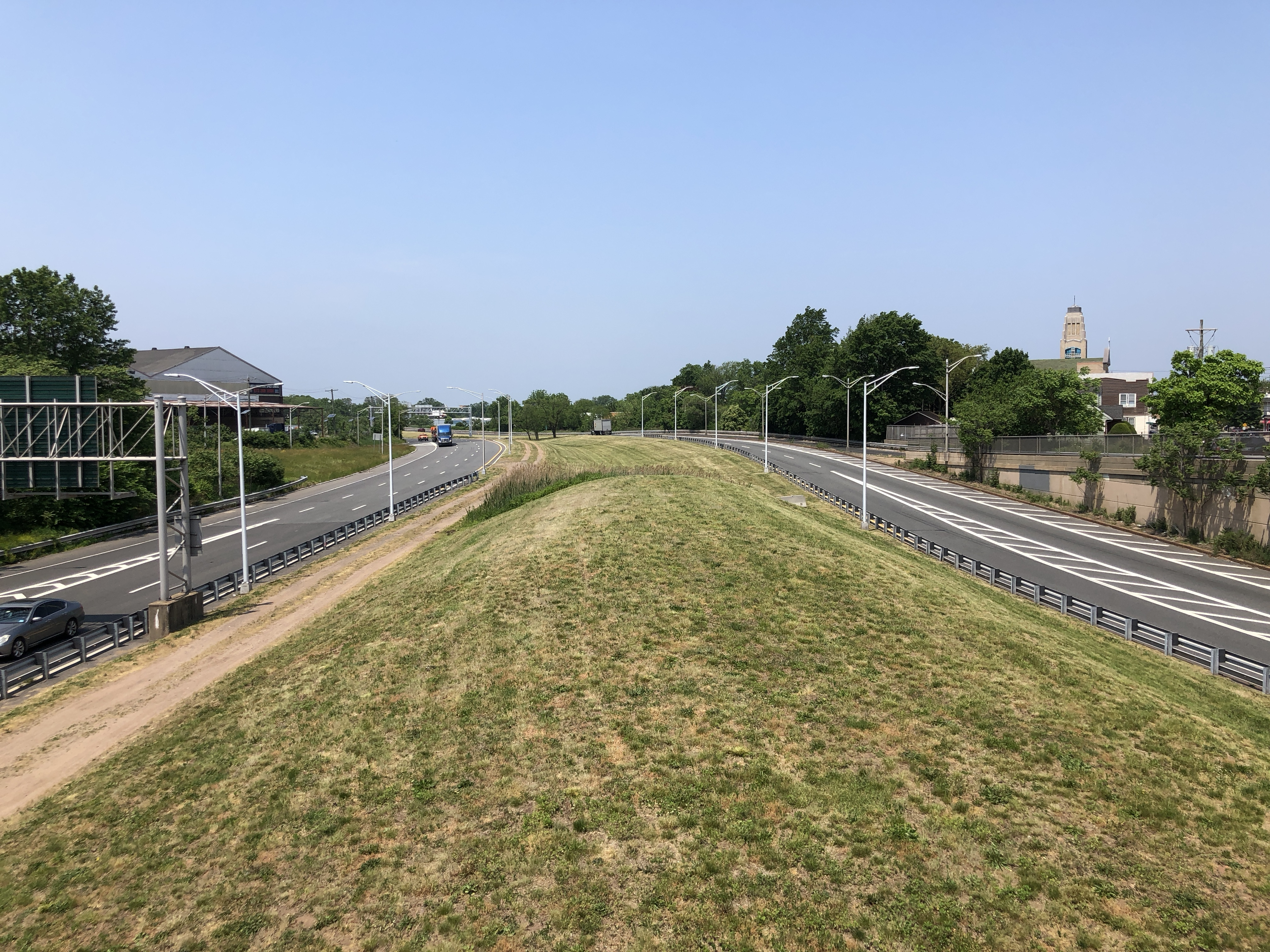
View west along I-278 between the New Jersey Turnpike and US 1/9 in Elizabeth. The wide median provided room for an intended expansion and extension of the road which never occurred.

The New Jersey segment of I-278 begins in Linden, Union County, at the junction with US 1 and US 9 (US 1/9), where it merges into the southbound direction of that road. The freeway heads east and carries two lanes in each direction, with the eastbound direction widening to three lanes. I-278 runs between urban residential areas to the north and Phillips 66's Bayway Refinery to the south as it continues into Elizabeth. In this area, the road meets Route 439 and the New Jersey Turnpike (I-95) at the only intermediate interchange that I-278 has in New Jersey. This short length is sometimes called the Union Freeway. After this interchange, I-278 turns southeast and crosses the New Jersey Turnpike, Conrail Shared Assets Operations' (CSAO) Chemical Coast Secondary line, a Staten Island Railway freight line that is used by CSAO, industrial areas, CSAO's Bayway Industrial Track line, and finally Arthur Kill on the six-lane Goethals Bridge into Staten Island, a borough of New York City. This bridge is maintained by the Port Authority of New York and New Jersey (PANYNJ).

=== Staten Island Expressway ===
Time-lapse video of a westbound trip on I-278

Upon coming onto Staten Island, I-278 becomes the SIE. After the Goethals Bridge, the highway passes under the Travis Branch railroad line that is owned by the Staten Island Railway and operated by CSAO and has a toll gantry serving the bridge. At this point, the freeway becomes eight lanes and maintained by the New York State Department of Transportation (NYSDOT), coming to an exit for Western and Forest avenues before reaching a directional interchange with the West Shore Expressway (New York State Route 440 (NY 440)). NY 440 forms a concurrency with I-278, and the road heads into residential neighborhoods. The road carries four lanes eastbound and three lanes westbound as it comes to the exit serving Richmond Avenue. Immediately after, NY 440 splits from the SIE at a large interchange, heading north on the Dr. Martin Luther King Jr. Expressway. This interchange also provides access to Victory Boulevard. East of this point, the expressway gains a bus lane in each direction. The six-lane I-278 turns to the east past this point, with Gannon Avenue South and Gannon Avenue North serving as frontage roads, and reaches the Bradley Avenue exit.

The next interchange the SIE is with Todt Hill Road and Slosson Avenue. This exchange was the original terminal of the bus lane in each direction that also serves as a high-occupancy vehicle lane (HOV lane) that was built in 2005. After Todt Hill Road and Slosson Avenue, I-278 runs through a wooded area where it comes to an incomplete interchange that was to be the northern terminus of the Richmond Parkway. The road continues back into residential areas and comes to an interchange serving Clove Road and Richmond Road. Past this, I-278 passes over the Staten Island Railway rapid transit line. The next interchange the freeway has is with Hylan Boulevard. A short distance later, the SIE comes to a large interchange that serves Lily Pond Avenue and Bay Street. Immediately after, I-278 reaches the former toll plaza for the Verrazzano–Narrows Bridge, where electronic toll collection is in effect. I-278 goes onto the Verrazzano Bridge linking to Brooklyn over The Narrows. This bridge, which is maintained by the Triborough Bridge and Tunnel Authority (TBTA), has six lanes on the lower level and seven lanes on the upper level which includes one HOV lane. In addition to local traffic on Staten Island, the expressway provides the most direct route from Brooklyn and Long Island to New Jersey. It is widely known throughout the New York City area as one of the most congested roads in the city.

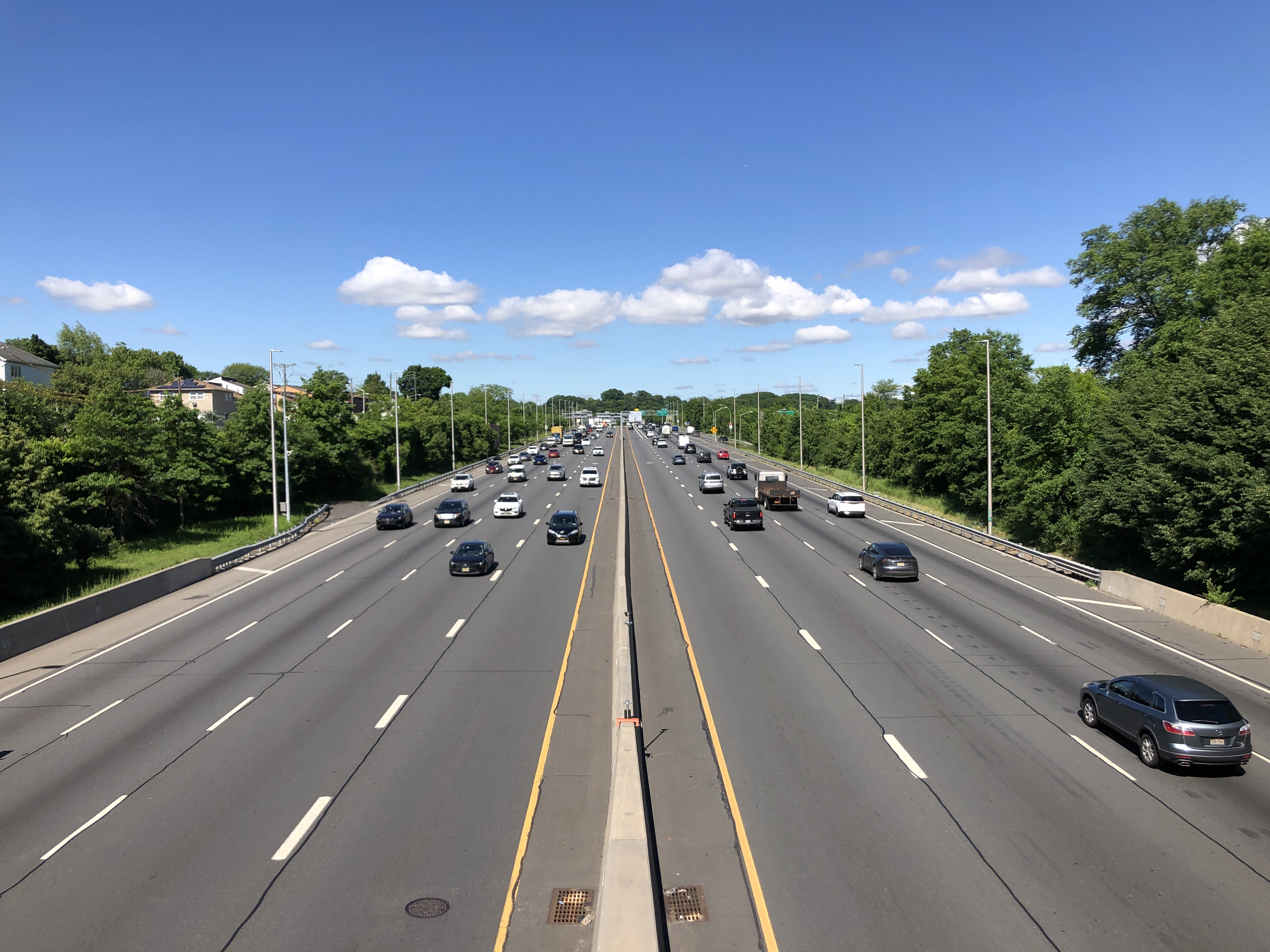
I-278 (Staten Island Expressway) westbound at Clove Road

=== Gowanus Expressway ===
After the Verrazzano–Narrows Bridge, I-278 continues into Brooklyn on the Gowanus Expressway. Immediately after the bridge, the freeway comes to an eastbound exit and westbound entrance for the Belt Parkway. After this, a full interchange serves 92nd Street at which point I-278 becomes a single-level six-lane freeway. Soon after, one of the eastbound lanes becomes an HOV lane, continuing east to the Brooklyn-Battery Tunnel. restricted to buses, carpools, and vehicles with three or more occupants. On weekdays, this HOV lane carries eastbound traffic in the morning and westbound traffic in the afternoon. The lane is closed at other times, including certain New York City government holidays.

The Gowanus Expressway continues northeast into urban residential neighborhoods and reaches an eastbound interchange at Fort Hamilton Parkway and a westbound interchange at 86th Street. Turning more to the north, I-278 comes to a partial interchange at 65th Street, with an exit eastbound and entrance eastbound. The road curves northwest at this point and comes to a directional interchange providing access to 3rd Avenue and the Belt Parkway. The Gowanus Expressway turns northeast again at the interchange with Belt Parkway, and it continues along an elevated alignment above Third Avenue, running through urban residential and commercial areas. Along this viaduct, I-278 has interchanges with 38th Street/39th Street and the Prospect Expressway (NY 27).

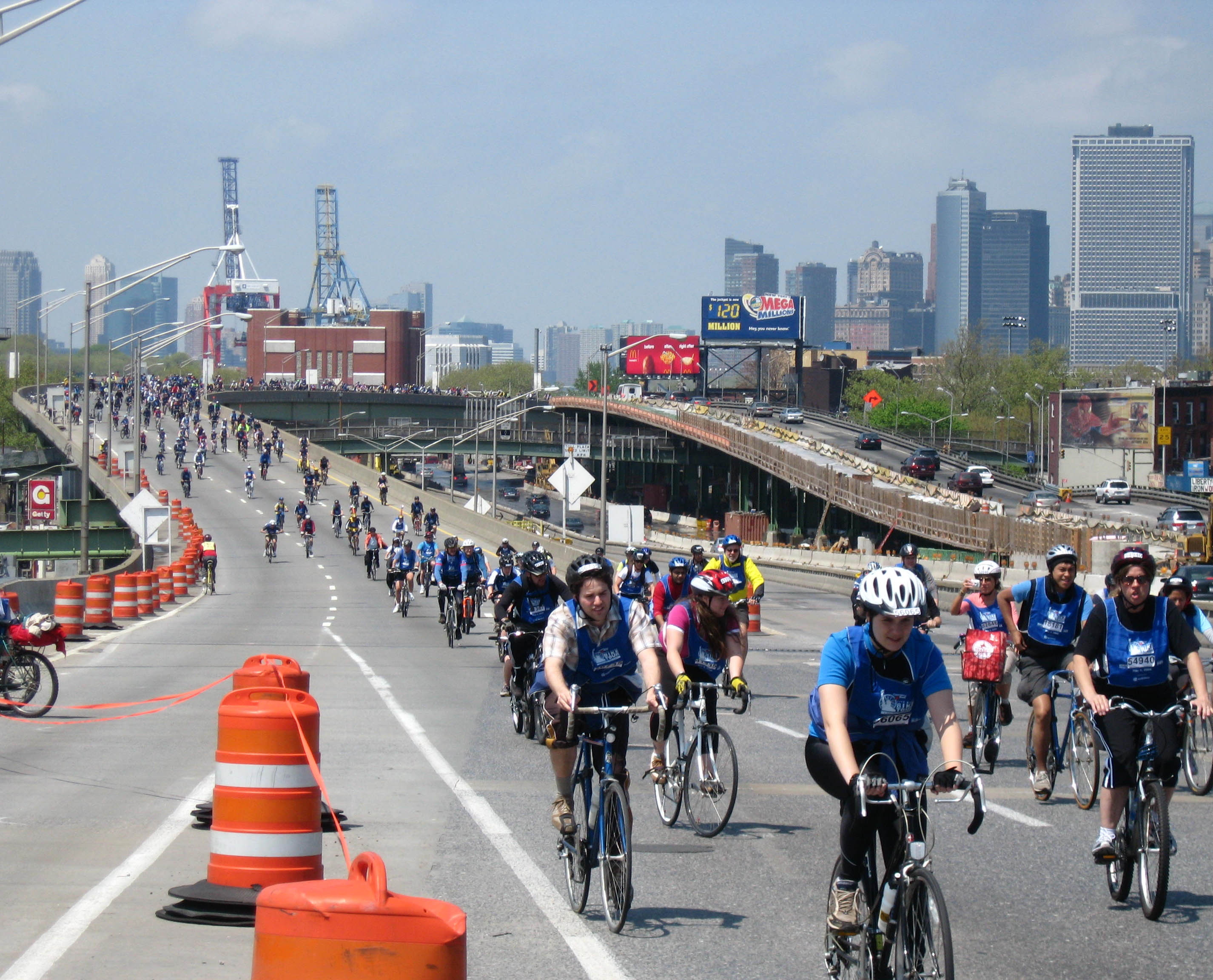
The Gowanus Expressway during the 2008 Five Boro Bike Tour

After the interchange with the Prospect Expressway (NY 27), the freeway widens to eight lanes and heads north, coming to an interchange with the Brooklyn–Battery Tunnel approach (officially the Hugh L. Carey Tunnel, I-478), with the exit ramps splitting from the median of I-278. Westbound access to the tunnel is provided by the Hamilton Avenue exit. In this area, the freeway passes over the Gowanus Canal, an extremely polluted canal that was once used for shipping. The site has been designated a Superfund site by the Environmental Protection Agency.

=== Brooklyn–Queens Expressway ===
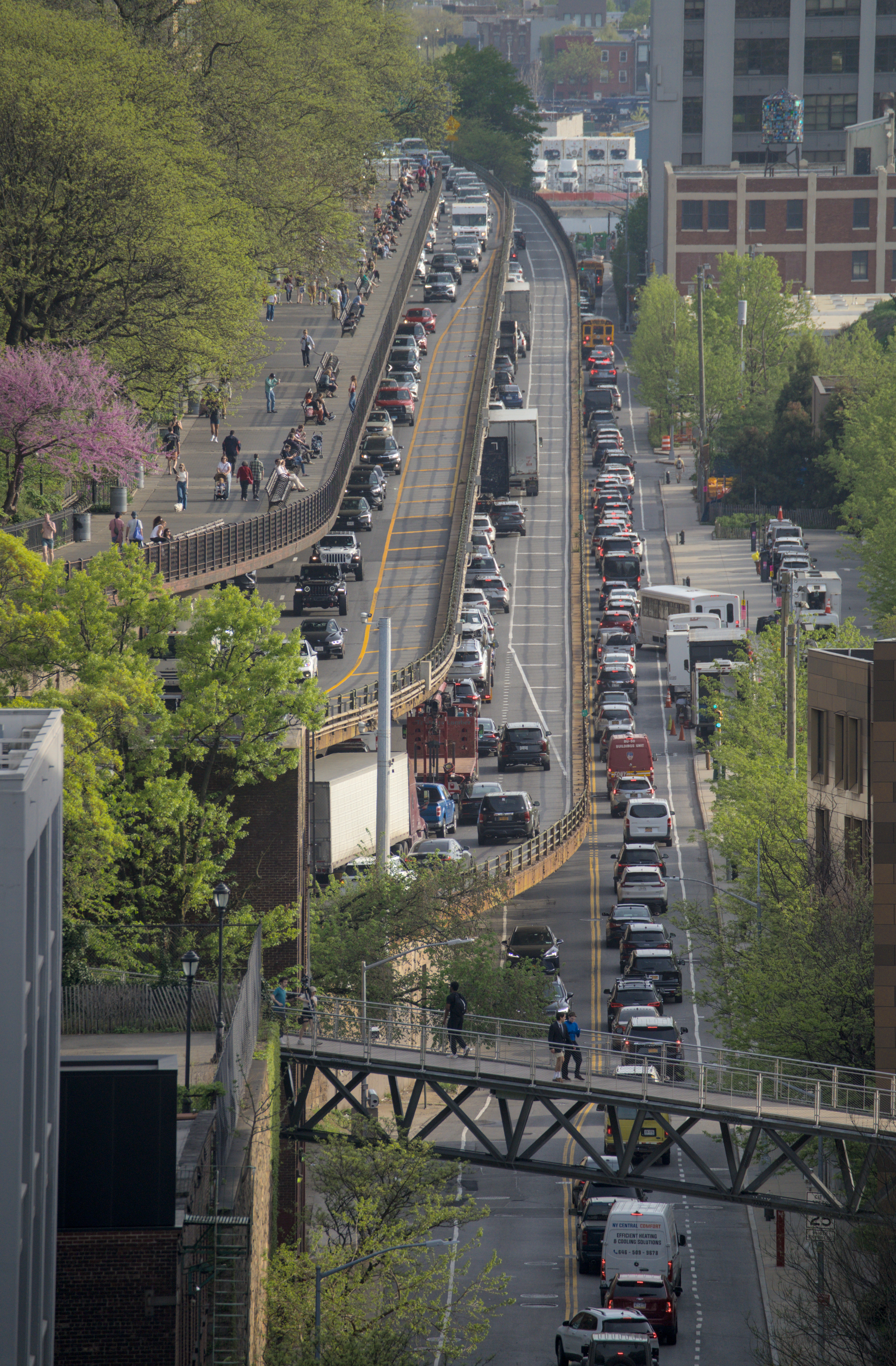
The BQE under Brooklyn Heights Promenade as seen from the Brooklyn Bridge.

After the exit for the Brooklyn–Battery Tunnel, I-278 heads north onto the six-lane BQE, passing through urban neighborhoods near Downtown Brooklyn on a depressed alignment. The next interchange the highway reaches serves Atlantic Avenue. After Atlantic Avenue, the road runs along the East River harbor in Downtown Brooklyn/Brooklyn Heights and is partially covered to create the Brooklyn Heights Promenade. As of October 2021, the roadway has been reduced to two lanes in each direction between Atlantic Avenue and the Brooklyn Bridge as part of efforts to extend the life of the roadway and meet modern safety standards for lane width and shoulders. I-278, at this point maintained by the New York City Department of Transportation, makes a sharp turn to the east away from the East River and comes to an interchange serving the Brooklyn Bridge and Cadman Plaza. The freeway continues on an elevated alignment and makes a turn southeast as it comes to ramps accessing the Manhattan Bridge. As of 2022, the city portion is planned to be rebuilt.

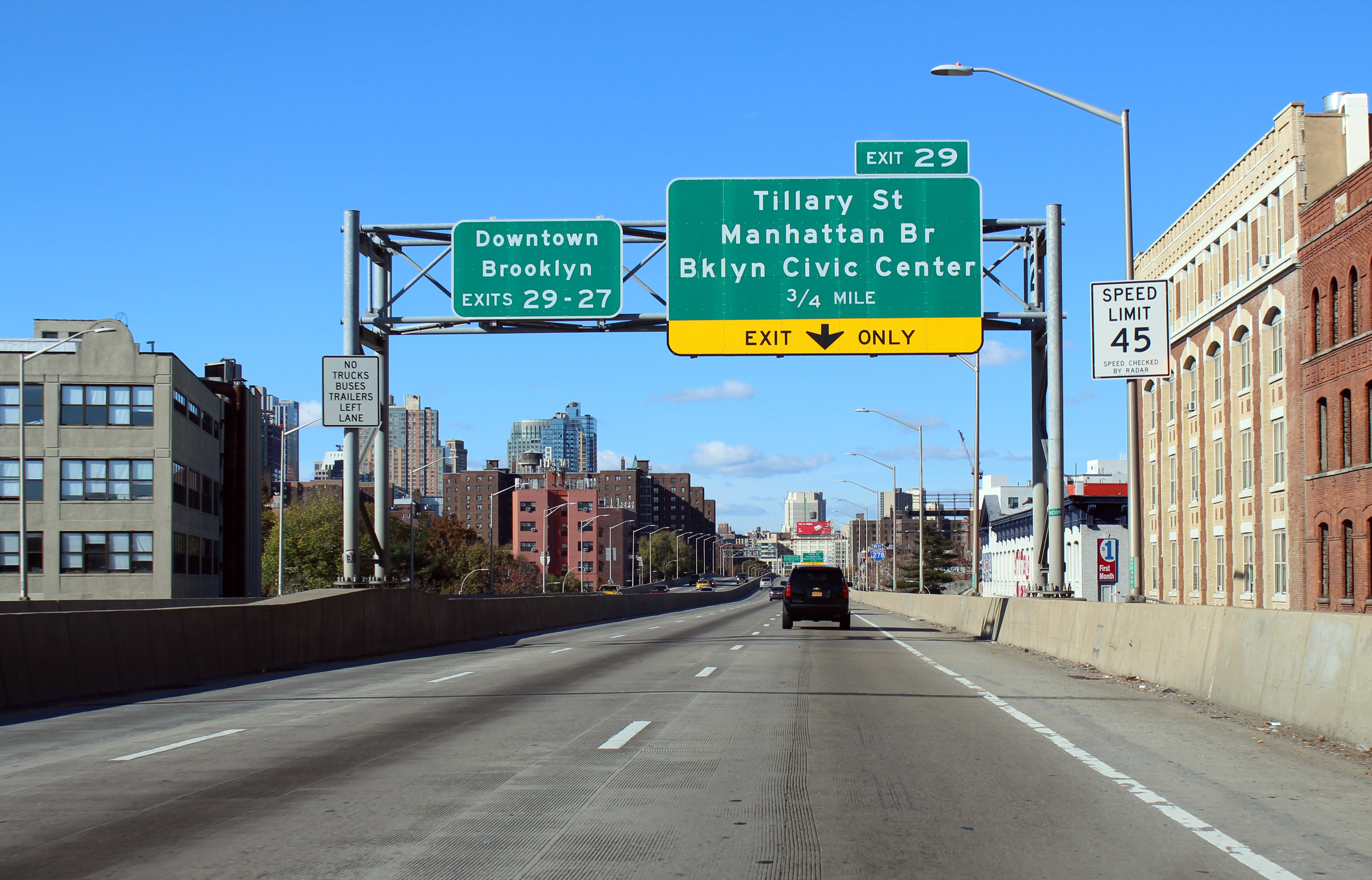
I-278 westbound approaching Downtown Brooklyn

North of the bridges, the highway becomes state-maintained again and reaches at an exit serving Tillary Street and Flushing Avenue. At this point, the BQE continues east through residential areas and turns northeast upon coming to the Wythe Avenue/Kent Avenue exit. The road passes through the Williamsburg neighborhood on a depressed alignment, reaching an interchange that serves the Williamsburg Bridge, with an exit at Metropolitan Avenue a short distance later. I-278 becomes elevated again as it passes through more neighborhoods and comes to the interchange with Humboldt Street/McGuinness Boulevard. The BQE enters more industrial areas as it comes to the Meeker Avenue/Morgan Avenue exit.

I-278 crosses the Newtown Creek into Queens on the Kosciuszko Bridge. Upon entering Queens, the BQE runs north between residential neighborhoods to the east and Calvary Cemetery to the west before coming to an interchange with the LIE (I-495). After I-495, the freeway makes a turn to the east, passing over a residential street before crossing over New Calvary Cemetery. The road turns northeast through more urban neighborhoods and reaches an interchange at Queens Boulevard (NY 25). At this point, I-278 becomes city-maintained again and passes under the Long Island Rail Road's Main Line as it continues into a depressed alignment. The BQE turns north as it approaches the exit for Broadway and Roosevelt Avenue. I-278 heads back onto a viaduct and comes to a single-point urban interchange at Northern Boulevard (NY 25A). A short distance past Northern Boulevard (NY 25A), the freeway splits into east and west segments with four lanes each that respectively merge into the Grand Central Parkway east- and westbound. Astoria Boulevard is accessible from either leg. Both legs receive Interstate funding, though only the western leg is signed as part of I-278.

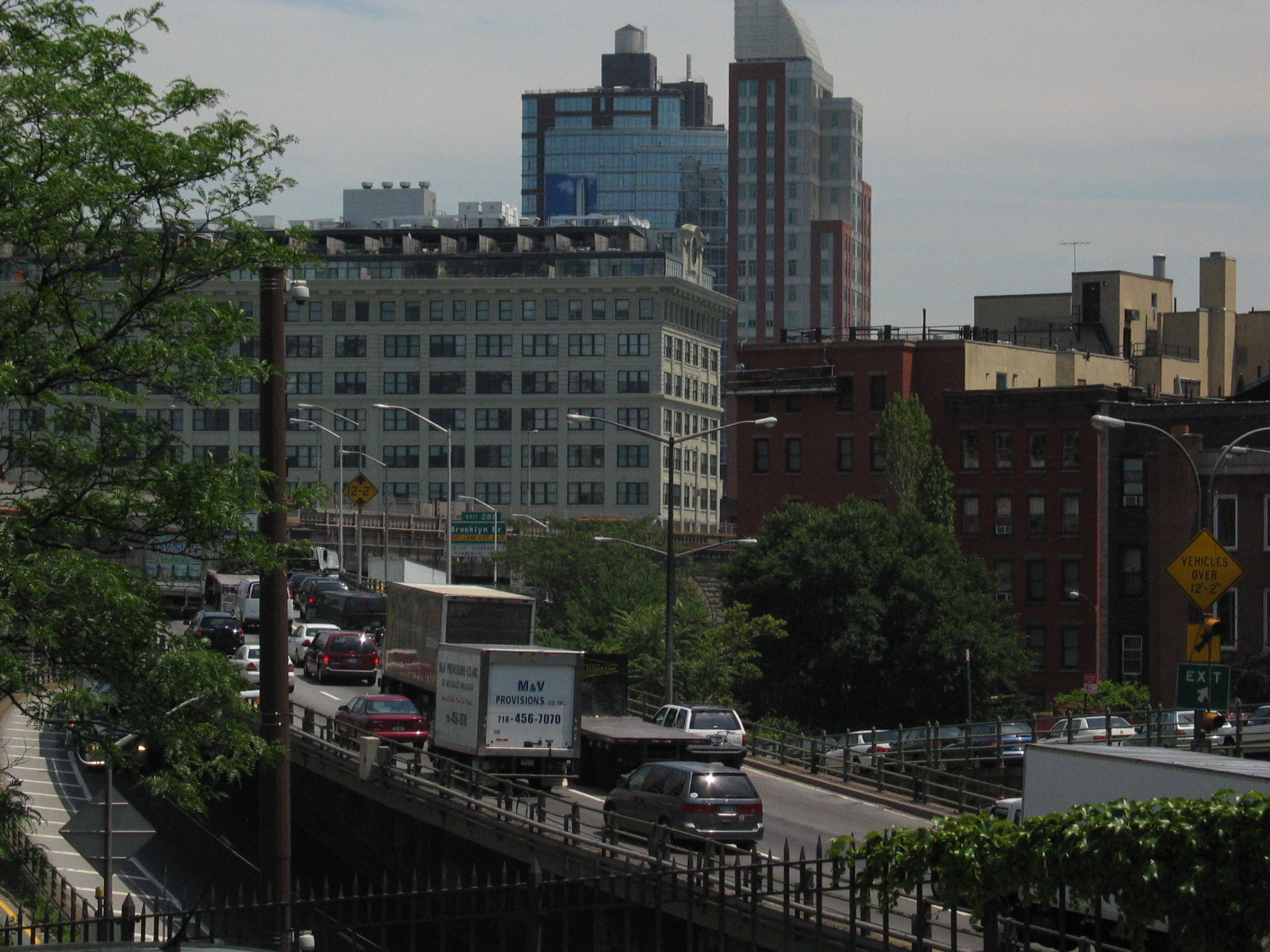
The expressway rising to its elevated section in Brooklyn

=== Grand Central Parkway and Robert F. Kennedy Bridge ===
I-278 turns west to run along the eight-lane state-maintained Grand Central Parkway, with Astoria Boulevard (and Hoyt Avenue later on) serving as a frontage road. The road runs along a depressed alignment, passing under Amtrak's Northeast Corridor, then the New York City Subway's BMT Astoria Line at 31st Street. The Grand Central Parkway overlap ends at the interchange with 31st Street, and I-278 continues northwest along the tolled, eight-lane Robert F. Kennedy Bridge, which passes over Astoria. Eastbound tolls are collected electronically at this point.

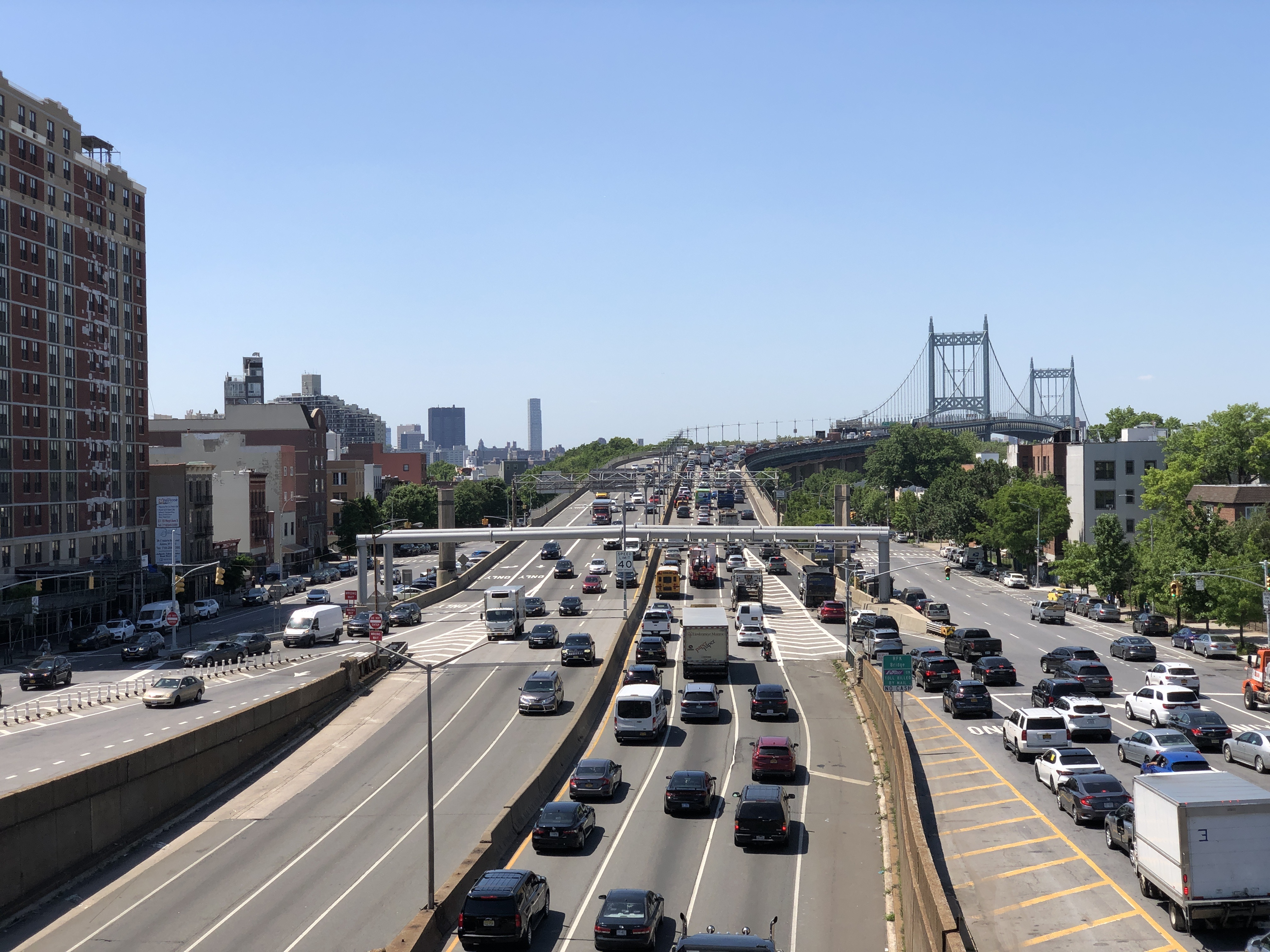
Approach to the Robert F. Kennedy (Triborough) Bridge in Astoria, with Hoyt Avenue on either side

I-278 crosses the East River on the Robert F. Kennedy Bridge, which is maintained by the TBTA. It then enters Wards Island, which is a part of the borough of Manhattan. On Wards Island, the highway heads north through Wards Island Park and passes to the east of Manhattan Psychiatric Center as it passes over the border onto Randalls Island, which is connected to Wards Island by land. I-278 passes through the bridge's former toll plaza before an interchange that provides access to FDR Drive by way of another segment of the Robert F. Kennedy Bridge over the Harlem River. After this interchange, the Robert F. Kennedy Bridge carries the route over the Bronx Kill into the Bronx, where westbound tolls are collected electronically.

=== Bruckner Expressway ===
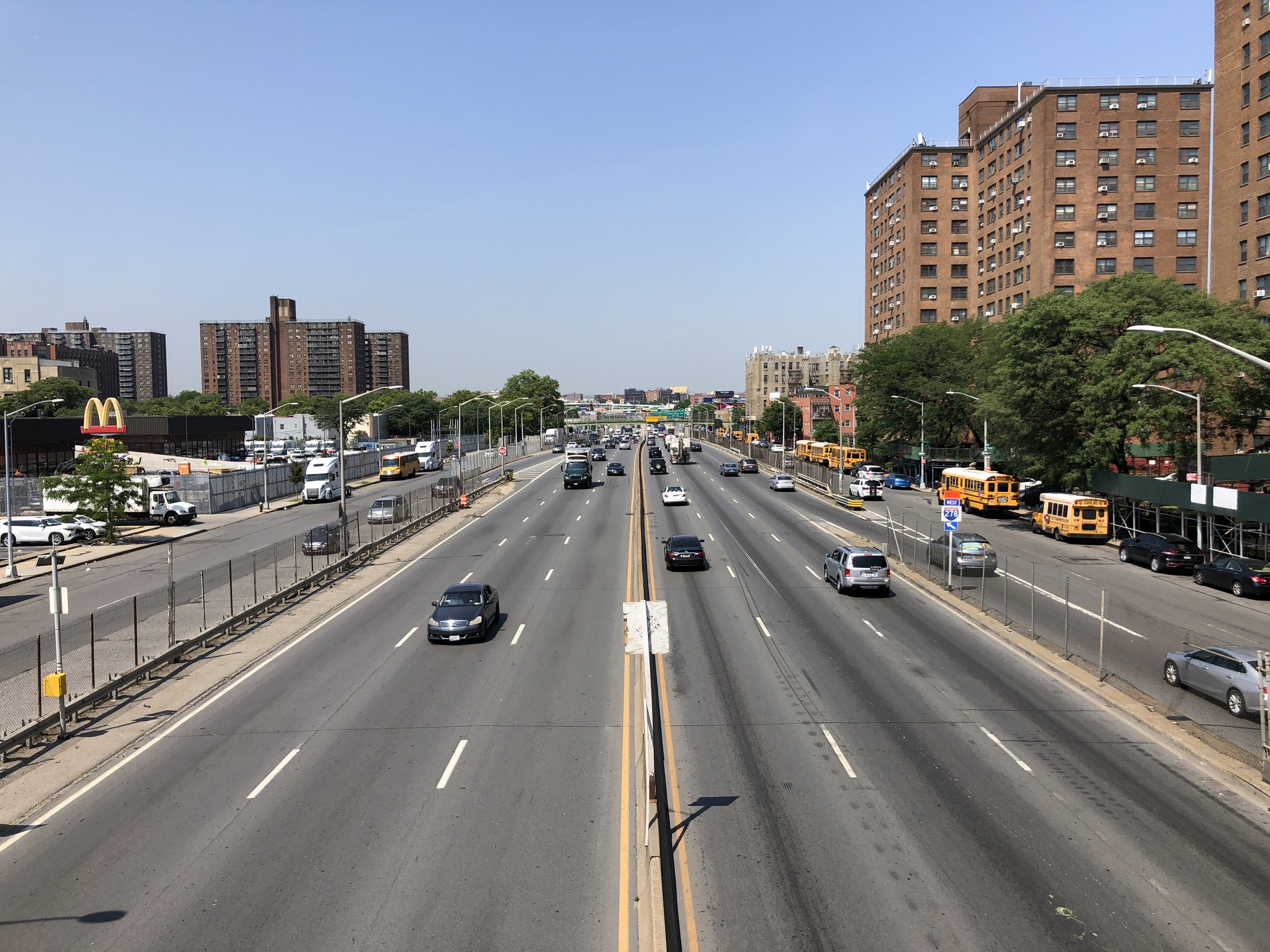
Westbound I-278 (Bruckner Expressway) at Stratford Avenue in the Bronx

In the Bronx, I-278 becomes the Bruckner Expressway and reaches an interchange with the Major Deegan Expressway (I-87). At this point, the Bruckner Expressway heads northeast on a six-lane elevated alignment through industrial areas with some residences, paralleling the Northeast Corridor. Along this section, there is a westbound exit and eastbound entrance for East 138th Street. Sheridan Boulevard (NY 895) splits from the eastbound direction of I-278 as the Bruckner Expressway makes a turn to the east into residential and commercial neighborhoods on a surface alignment, crossing the Bronx River on a drawbridge. The road has an interchange at Hunts Point Avenue before coming to the Bronx River Parkway. Continuing east, the road has an exit serving White Plains Road and Castle Hill Avenue.

I-278's eastern terminus is at the Bruckner Interchange further to the east. Here, the Bruckner Expressway becomes I-95 and continues towards the New England Thruway. At this interchange, I-278 also has access to the Clearview Expressway (I-295), the Hutchinson River Expressway (I-678), and the Hutchinson River Parkway itself. Legally, the New York section of I-278 is defined as part of Interstate Route Connector 512 and all of Interstate Route Connector 518 in New York Highway Law § 340-a.

== History ==
=== New Jersey ===
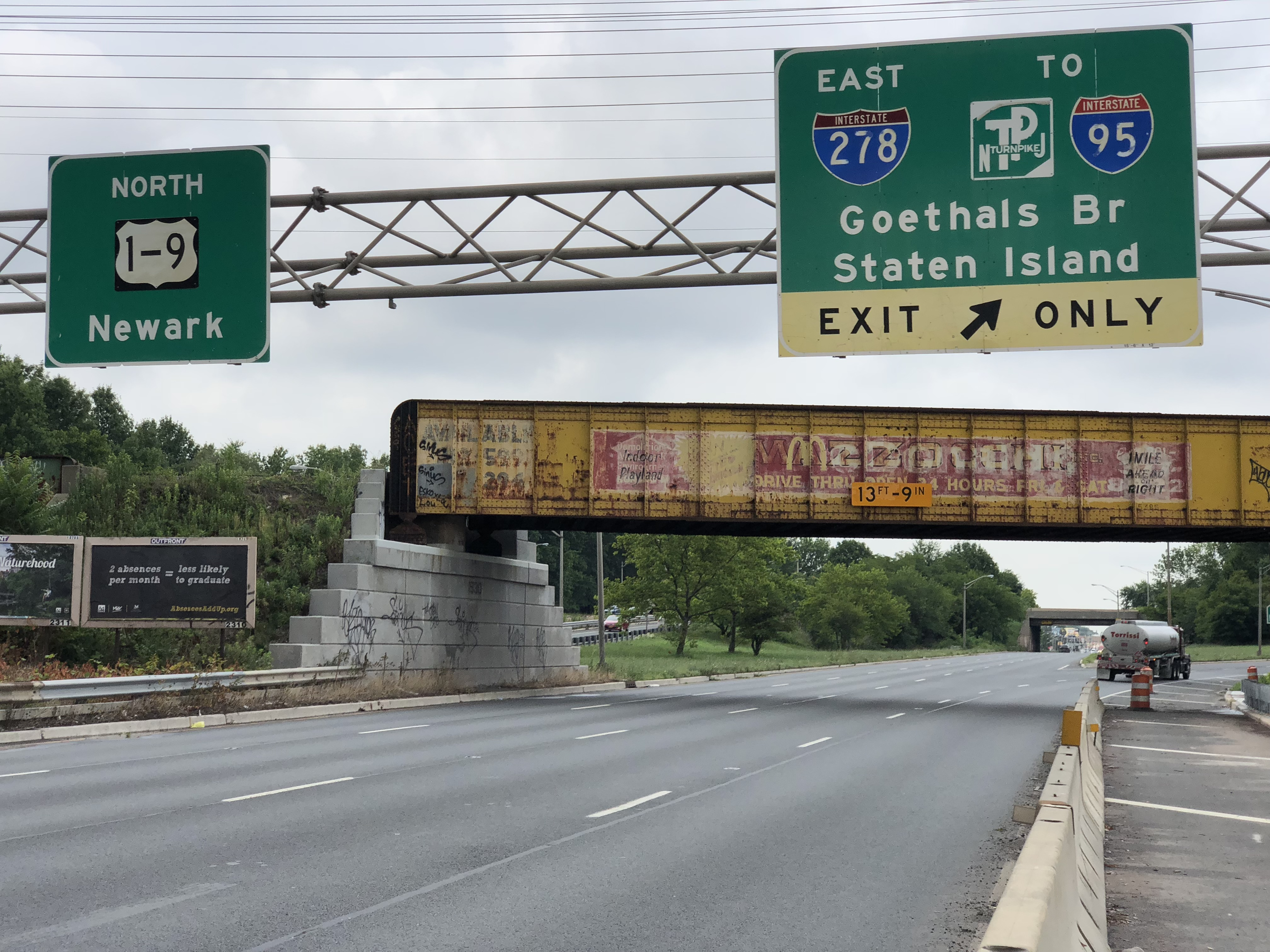
The start of I-278 in New Jersey

The New Jersey portion of freeway was planned in 1955 as the Union Freeway and designated as I-278 in 1958. It was to connect the Goethals Bridge west to I-78 at the tripoint of Springfield, Union Township, and Millburn. The western part of this planned freeway faced strong opposition. Even though it was to run along an abandoned railroad right-of-way, it would traverse through dense development in Roselle Park, Kenilworth, and Union Township, thereby making the project further disliked. By 1967, state officials decided not to pursue the continuation of I-278 and used the funds for I-278 to build I-195 across Central Jersey instead. The only section of I-278 in New Jersey was built between US 1/9 in Linden and the Goethals Bridge, opening to traffic in 1969 at a cost of $11.5 million (equivalent to $77.3 million in 2025).

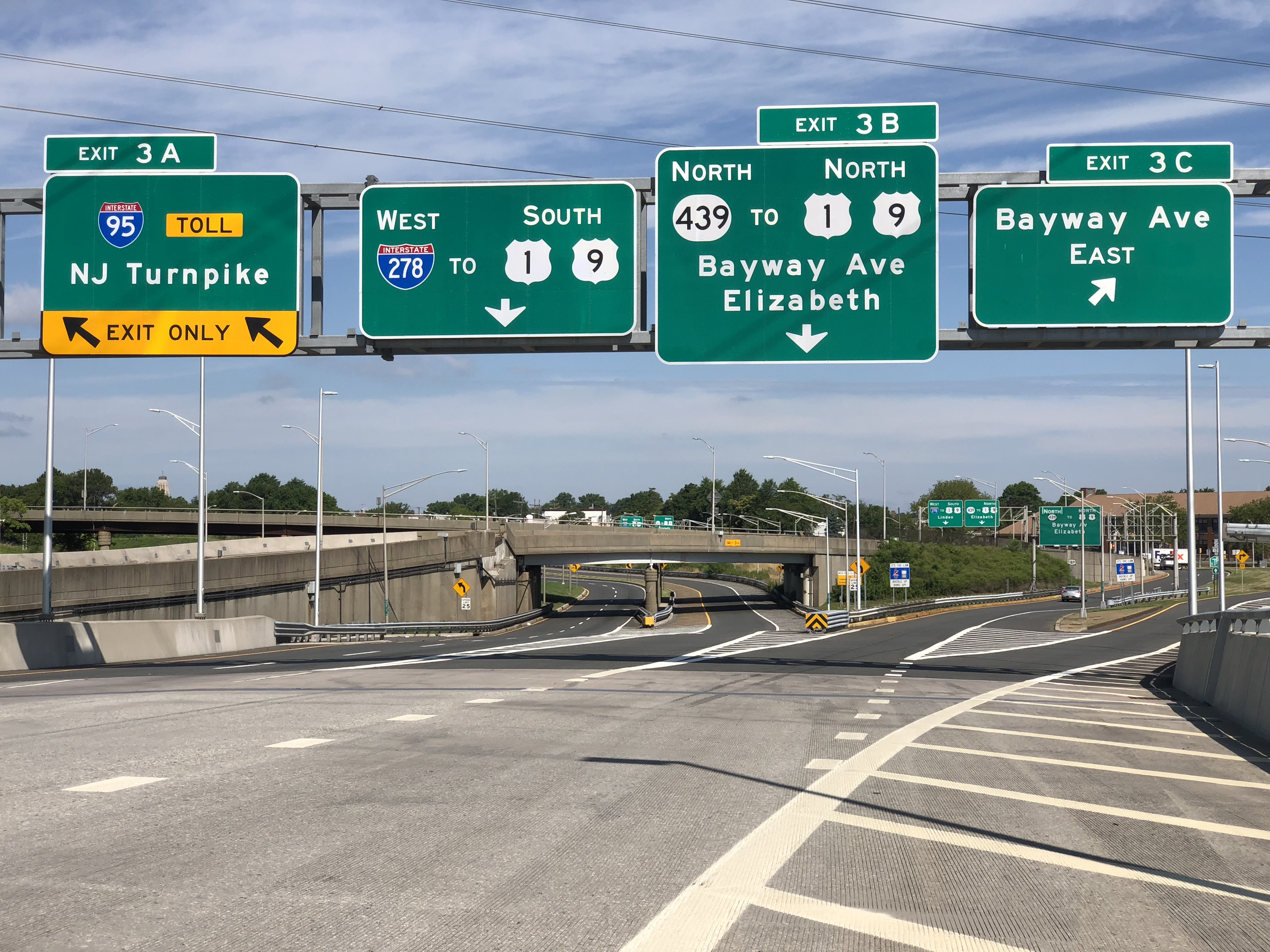
I-278 westbound entering New Jersey

The Union Freeway Extension was revived in the late 1960s and was to start at US 1/9 but end at I-287 in Hanover Township, following Route 24 between I-78 and I-287. However, the Federal Highway Administration (FHWA) rejected the proposal in 1970, thus ending the I-278 project.

The original four-lane Goethals Bridge, which predated the I-278 designation, was replaced with two new three-lane cable-stayed bridges, each carrying traffic in one direction. The new eastbound bridge opened to both directions of traffic in June 2017, and westbound traffic was shifted to the new westbound bridge in May 2018.

=== Staten Island Expressway ===
The SIE was first planned in 1941 as the Cross-Richmond Express Highway, a freeway connecting the Goethals and Verrazzano–Narrows bridges that was a part of a comprehensive system of freeways and parkways for the borough of Staten Island. In 1945, Robert Moses took over planning for the freeway and called it the Clove Lakes Expressway. The plan received approval in stages through the mid-1950s, and construction on the expressway began in 1959. By this time, the SIE had received the I-278 designation.

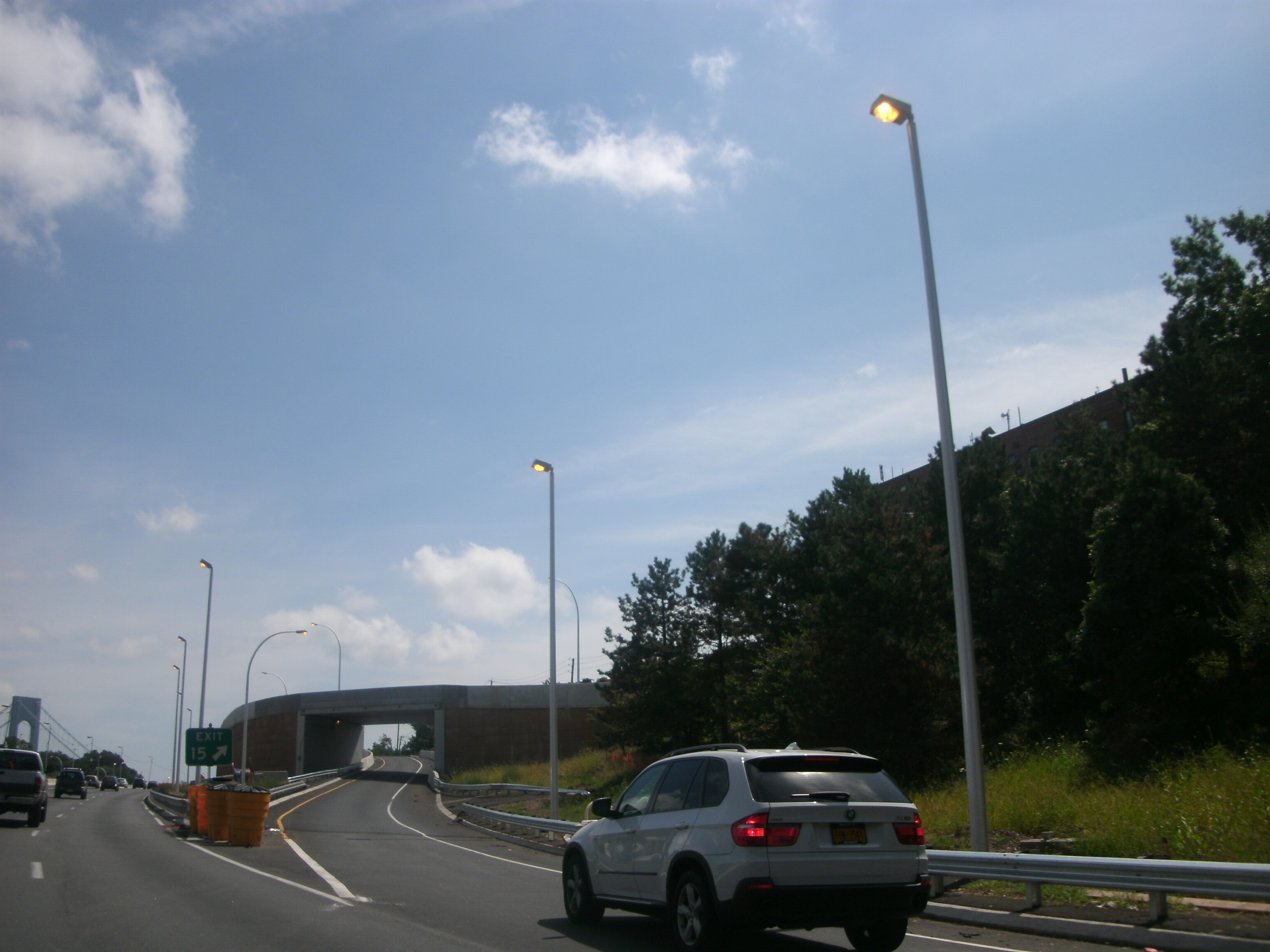
The new exit 15 on the SIE eastbound, opened on July 9, 2012

The construction of the SIE was particularly noted for the massive movement of earth required to build the section of the highway between Clove Road and Price Street (now Narrows Road North, a service road of the expressway) between Grymes Hill and Emerson Hill. The earth removed from the cut in the hill was placed in a remote section of central Staten Island adjacent to Sea View Hospital and has since been nicknamed "Moses Mountain". Originally, Moses intended for a spur of the expressway, the Richmond Parkway, to follow the central ridge of the island, connecting with the Outerbridge Crossing in the southwestern part of the island. However, there was massive local opposition to this spur, and, unlike previous projects by Moses, the northern half of the spur was canceled when Mayor John Lindsay took office in 1966. The southern half of this proposed spur was built, however. The aborted section, from the expressway to Richmond Avenue, has become a part of the Staten Island Greenbelt, one of New York City's public parks. A ramp stub of an interchange on the expressway, cut into the hills of Todt Hill, still exists. Part of the trail system of the greenbelt was using the abandoned overpass bridge as pedestrian crossing of the expressway up until 2013, when it was dismantled for lane widening improvements.

The first link of the SIE opened in January 1964, from the Goethals Bridge to Victory Boulevard. The remainder opened later that year. The freeway had a total cost of $47 million (equivalent to $372 million in 2025). In 1998, bus lanes were created on the eastern part of the SIE near the Verrazzano–Narrows Bridge; they were extended west to Todt Hill Road/Slosson Avenue in 2005. In 2008, the bus lanes were opened to high-occupancy vehicles during rush hours.

In July 2008, officials announced a $50-million (equivalent to $73.3 million in 2025) project to improve the severe traffic conditions on a 1.8-mile (2.9 km) stretch of the expressway. Included in the project is the construction of six new on- and offramps, improvements to and relocations of existing on- and offramps, and other improvements to surrounding roads. This followed numerous minor alterations to alleviate traffic, such as time/distance displays and the designated bus lanes. Construction started in November 2010, with the project then expected to cost $75 million (equivalent to $108 million in 2025). A new exit 15, which served Lily Pond Avenue and Bay Street on the eastern end of Staten Island, opened to traffic on July 9, 2012, replacing a former exit further to the east. Signage was also changed to display Fingerboard Road and Lily Pond Avenue as the outlet for the new exit, rather than Lily Pond Avenue and Bay Street. On January 17, 2013, westbound exit 13 was permanently closed in favor of a new interchange setup, which involved two new ramps: exit 13B for Richmond Road and Targee Street and exit 13A for Clove Road.

=== Gowanus Expressway ===
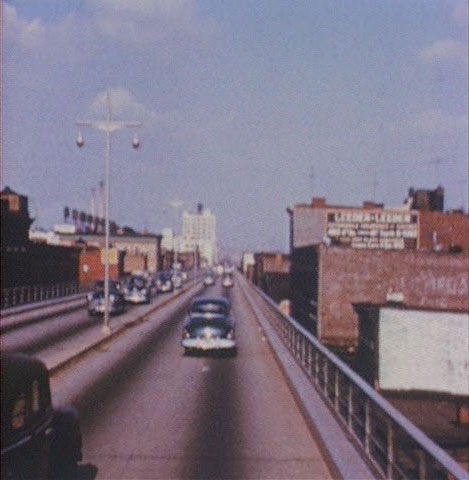
The original Gowanus Expressway in 1954, before widening. This part was built on the BMT Third Avenue Elevated

The Gowanus Expressway was initially the Gowanus Parkway, first planned in the 1930s. Construction of the road, overseen by Robert Moses, started in 1939, with the parkway being built on top of the BMT Third Avenue Line. The parkway was completed in 1941 and became part of the Belt Parkway that received the NY 27A designation. The Gowanus Parkway was to be reconstructed into the Gowanus Expressway in the 1950s to connect the Verrazzano–Narrows Bridge to the Brooklyn–Battery Tunnel. The first segment of the Gowanus Expressway, from the Brooklyn–Battery Tunnel to the Prospect Expressway (NY 27), was opened in May 1950. The freeway was initially planned to be twelve lanes, with two three-lane roadways in each direction, but it was ultimately reduced to a six-lane highway to reduce disruption to the Bay Ridge neighborhood. The Gowanus Expressway was incorporated into the Interstate Highway System and became a component of I-278. The conversion of Gowanus Expressway to a six-lane freeway configuration was completed in 1964 at a cost of $100 million (equivalent to $792 million in 2025). The NY 27A designation was removed from the Gowanus Expressway by 1970.

By 2000, an HOV lane was added to the eastbound Gowanus Expressway to serve traffic heading toward Manhattan. Over the years, the viaduct structure of the Gowanus Expressway has deteriorated. In 1998, a $16-million (equivalent to $29.4 million in 2025) feasibility study for a tunnel for the Gowanus Expressway was awarded. NYSDOT was considering putting the road in a tunnel, but, in November 2011, the FHWA canceled the project. The viaduct's vertical steel supports show material missing due to rust, but the federal government has stated that it is not in danger of collapse. In 2019, the New York City Department of Transportation (NYCDOT) took over maintenance of the Gowanus Expressway from the New York State Department of Transportation (NYSDOT).

=== Brooklyn–Queens Expressway and Grand Central Parkway ===
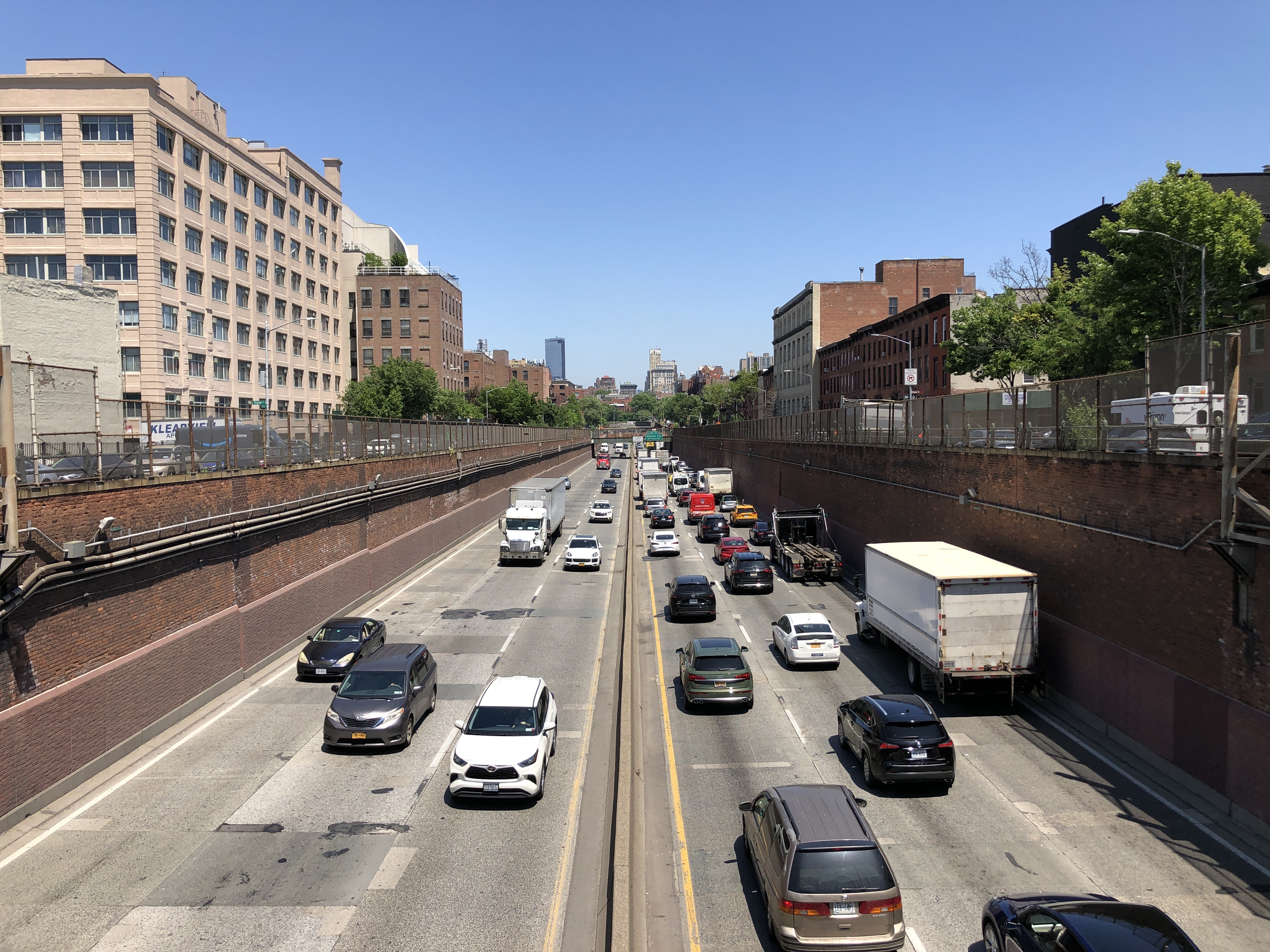
The Brooklyn-Queens Expressway looking eastbound from the overpass for Sackett Street in Brooklyn

The BQE was initially planned in 1936 as the Brooklyn–Queens Connecting Highway, a link between the Gowanus Parkway and the Robert F. Kennedy Bridge. The brief portion of I-278 on the Grand Central Parkway, connecting the BQE and the Robert F. Kennedy Bridge, had opened in the 1930s. A part of the Brooklyn–Queens Connecting Highway, namely the Kosciuszko Bridge and the viaducts leading to the bridge, opened in 1939 between Meeker Avenue/Morgan Avenue and Queens Boulevard (NY 25).

In 1940, Moses proposed an expressway between Queens and Brooklyn to relieve local streets of congestion from the Manhattan and Williamsburg bridges. The section between the Kosciuszko and Williamsburg bridges opened on May 25, 1950. A further extension between the Brooklyn–Battery Tunnel and the Brooklyn Bridge, which included the Brooklyn Heights Promenade, was opened on June 23, 1954, connecting to the Gowanus Expressway. This was followed by a mile-long (1.6 km) section between the Williamsburg Bridge and Flushing Avenue on September 1, 1958. Two sections of the expressway opened on August 26, 1959: a segment between the Brooklyn Bridge and Tillary Street in Brooklyn and between the Grand Central Parkway and Roosevelt Avenue in Queens. The expressway between Tillary Street and Flushing Avenue, around the Brooklyn Navy Yard, was opened shortly thereafter on January 6, 1960. The road in its entirety was completed on December 23, 1964 at a cost of $137 million (equivalent to $1.09 billion in 2025), with the opening of a mile-long (1.6 km) underpass connecting Queens Boulevard with Roosevelt Avenue. The major interchange with the Long Island Expressway was rebuilt in 1966 for $32.7 million (equivalent to $248 million in 2025).

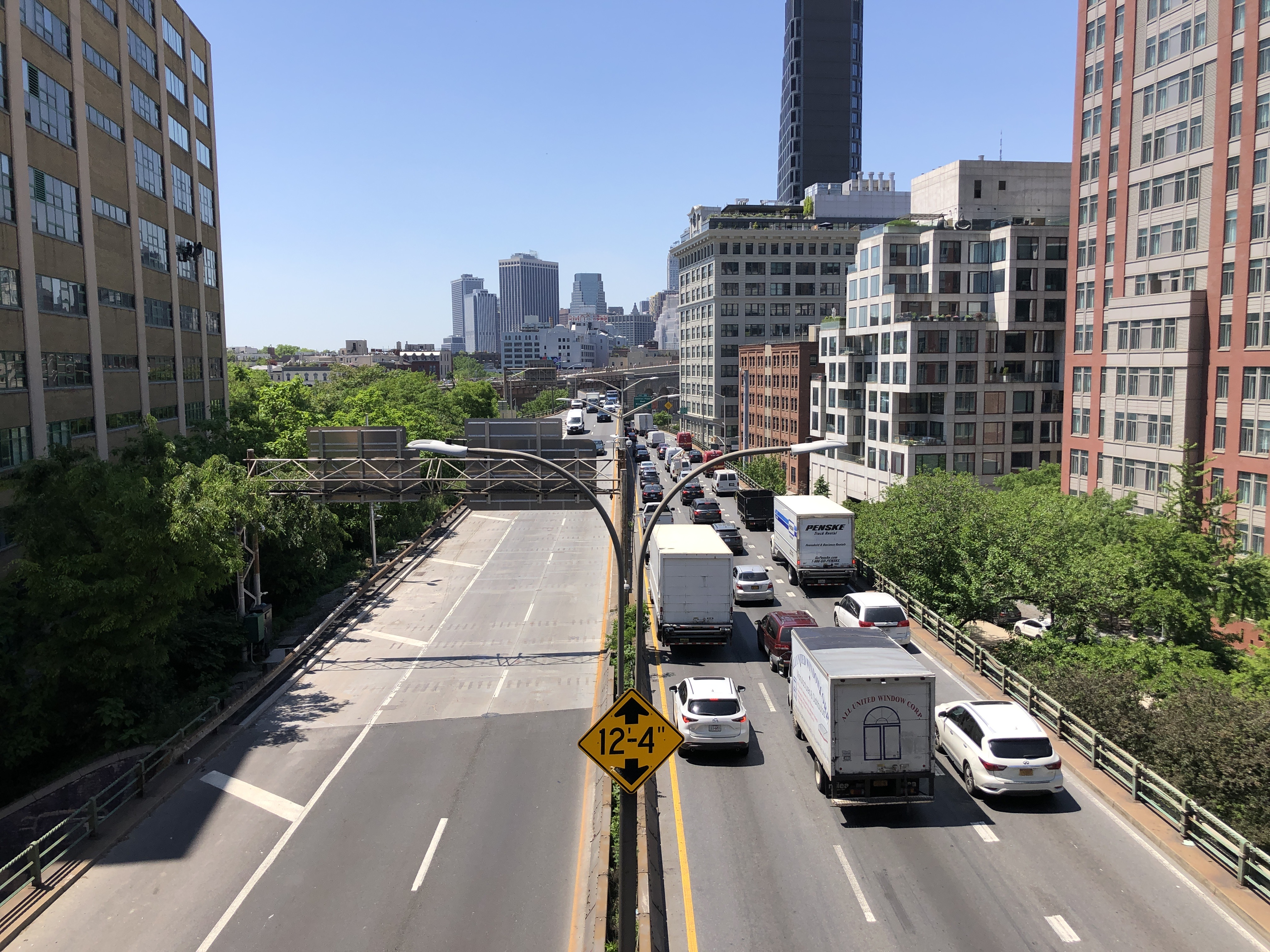
The westbound BQE through downtown Brooklyn

The construction of the BQE, overseen by Moses, tore through many residential neighborhoods in Brooklyn and Queens instead of following the East River. One portion of the expressway, the two-tiered promenade section in Brooklyn Heights that was designed by Moses, was originally planned to go straight through Hicks Street, then connect to the Brooklyn Bridge at Adams Street. Another route that was proposed by Moses would have continued up Hicks Street past Atlantic Avenue, removing all the buildings on one side of Court Street, then curving east into Tillary Street (at Cadman Plaza). The Brooklyn Heights Association was able to fight these proposed routes, which created the two-tiered section above Furman Street with the promenade over it. Several tunnels were later proposed to replace the promenade, but none of the tunnel proposals were supported or funded.

In 1958, existing segments of the expressway were eligible for Interstate Highway funding. For a short time, the segment of highway between the Robert F. Kennedy and Williamsburg bridges was to be designated I-87 and continue north as the Major Deegan Expressway. By 1959, the I-278 designation was given to the entire length of the highway. Since the roadway was constructed prior to modern expressway standards, the road needed to be upgraded to meet these standards. By the 1990s, a major multiyear project beginning in the 1980s brought upgrades to the BQE.

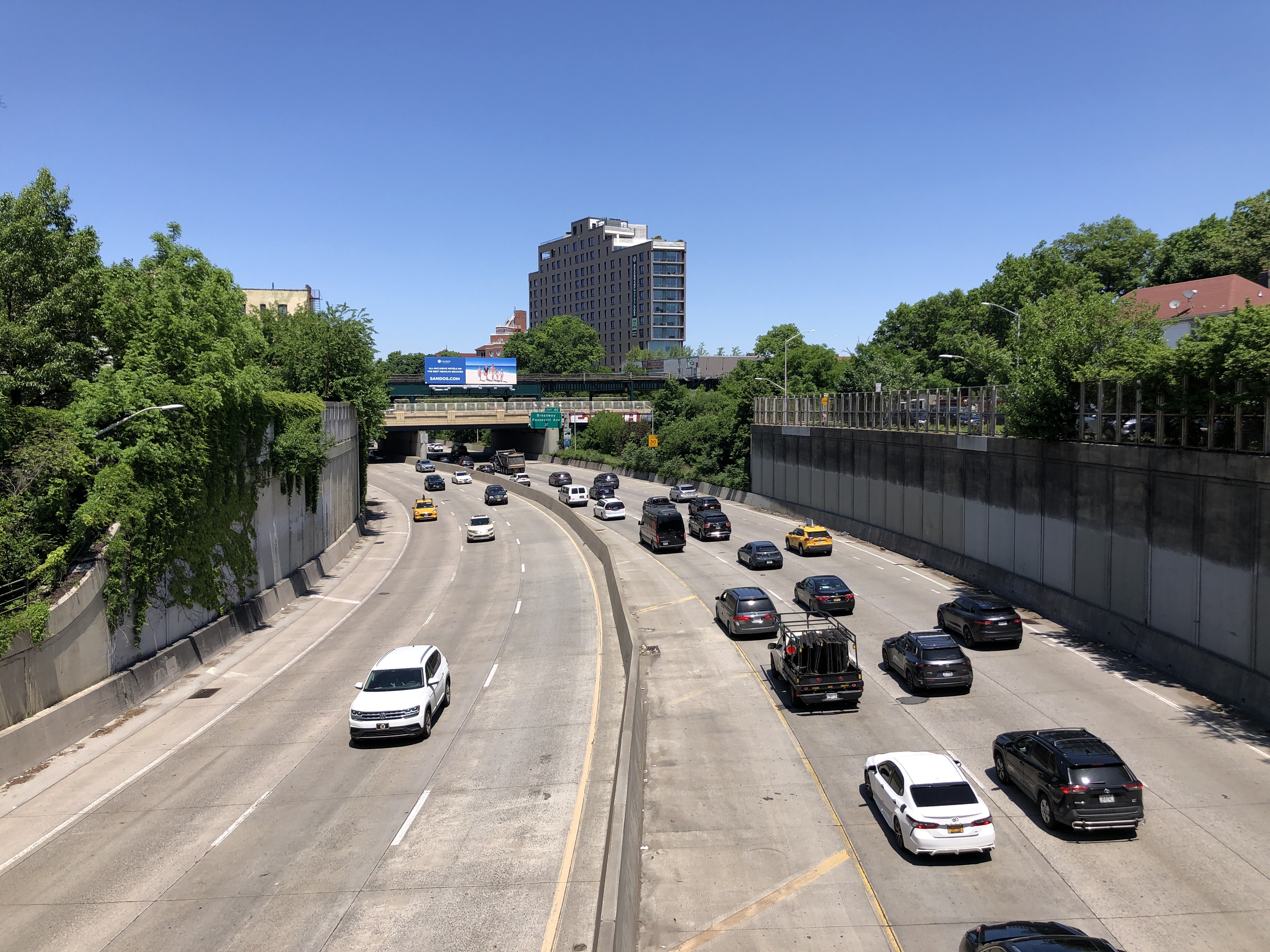
The BQE passing through a depressed section in Woodside, Queens

In the early 2000s, the expressway underwent another upgrade project that replaced the viaduct within Downtown Brooklyn and Fort Greene. Simultaneously, the Queens section of the BQE between Queens Boulevard and 25th Avenue was also renovated. The Koscisuzko Bridge was replaced from 2014 to 2017 with a new eastbound span that temporarily served both directions of traffic. A second span of the Kosciuszko Bridge opened in 2019 for westbound traffic, adding more lanes to the BQE across the bridge.

Formerly, the frontage road of the Grand Central Parkway between the BQE and the Robert F. Kennedy Bridge served as a truck route, since large trucks are not permitted on the parkway. Exemptions are provided for smaller trucks that conform with strict regulations, but only on the section of the Grand Central Parkway that overlaps with I-278. In December 2017, the state concluded a $2.5-million (equivalent to $3.22 million in 2025) project that lowered the roadbed of the section of the parkway that is concurrent with I-278. This section of I-278 now has a 14-foot (4.3 m) vertical clearance, which allows most trucks to stay on I-278. In late 2024, the NYCDOT began considering a plan to construct freeway caps above parts of the Brooklyn–Queens Expressway, as well as converting the spaces under the expressway into public plazas.

==== Proposed reconstruction in Brooklyn Heights ====
===== Early proposals =====
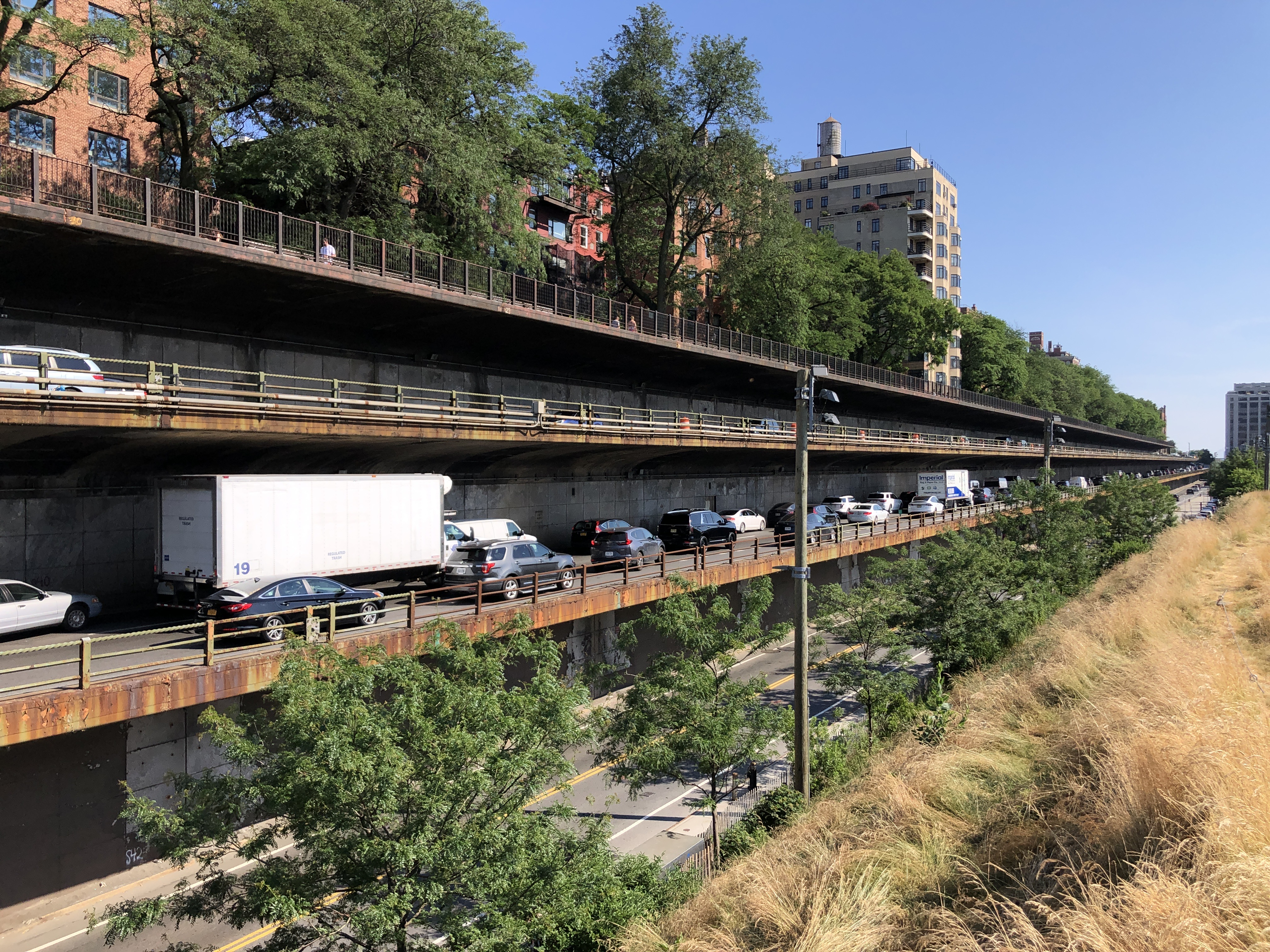
View southwest along the Brooklyn Heights Promenade section of the BQE, viewed from Brooklyn Bridge Park

In 1999, the think tank Reason Foundation proposed placing the BQE within Brooklyn Heights in a tunnel. However, NYCDOT did not seriously consider this suggestion until 2016 when it studied six possible tunnel configurations. NYCDOT found that only the tunnel option starting at 21st Street on Third Avenue and ending near Kent Avenue in Williamsburg would be feasible. This option would have served as a bypass, with vehicles heading to Downtown Brooklyn, or the Manhattan and Williamsburg bridges using the triple cantilever structure, which would be tolled. At the same time, the Brooklyn Heights Promenade was deteriorating significantly and was set to undergo renovations starting 2020. The structure is supported by steel rods inside rebar, which is corroding due to the seeping of road salt into widening cracks. If nothing was done on the roadway by 2026, weight restrictions would have to be implemented, with trucks diverted to local roads, and, by 2036, the city would have to shut down this section of the BQE.

In late 2018, NYSDOT proposed rebuilding the double-decker, 1.5-mile (2.4 km) section of I-278 running under the Brooklyn Heights Promenade, which had deteriorated severely over the years. Two options were proposed. The cheaper option, which would cost $3.3 billion to $3.6 billion (equivalent to $4.16 billion to $4.54 billion in 2025) and take six years, entailed building a temporary six-lane highway in the location of the promenade while they repaired the underlying structure. Under this option, lanes would be widened, and shoulders would have been added. In conjunction with the project, NYCDOT hoped to unify Van Voorhees Park, improve safety at the interchange with Atlantic Avenue, and possibly build a pedestrian bridge from Brooklyn Bridge Park to the promenade. The other, more expensive option, which would cost $3.4 billion to $4 billion (equivalent to $4.29 billion to $5.04 billion in 2025) and take over eight years, was to repair the existing six-lane highway one lane at a time. The promenade walkway would be closed for up to six years under the first option and for two years under the second option, with periodic closures for construction use. The NYCDOT commissioner, Polly Trottenberg, called the project "the most challenging project not only in New York City, but arguably in the United States right now". For the project, $1.7 billion in city funding was allocated, with the remainder to be footed from the state and federal governments.

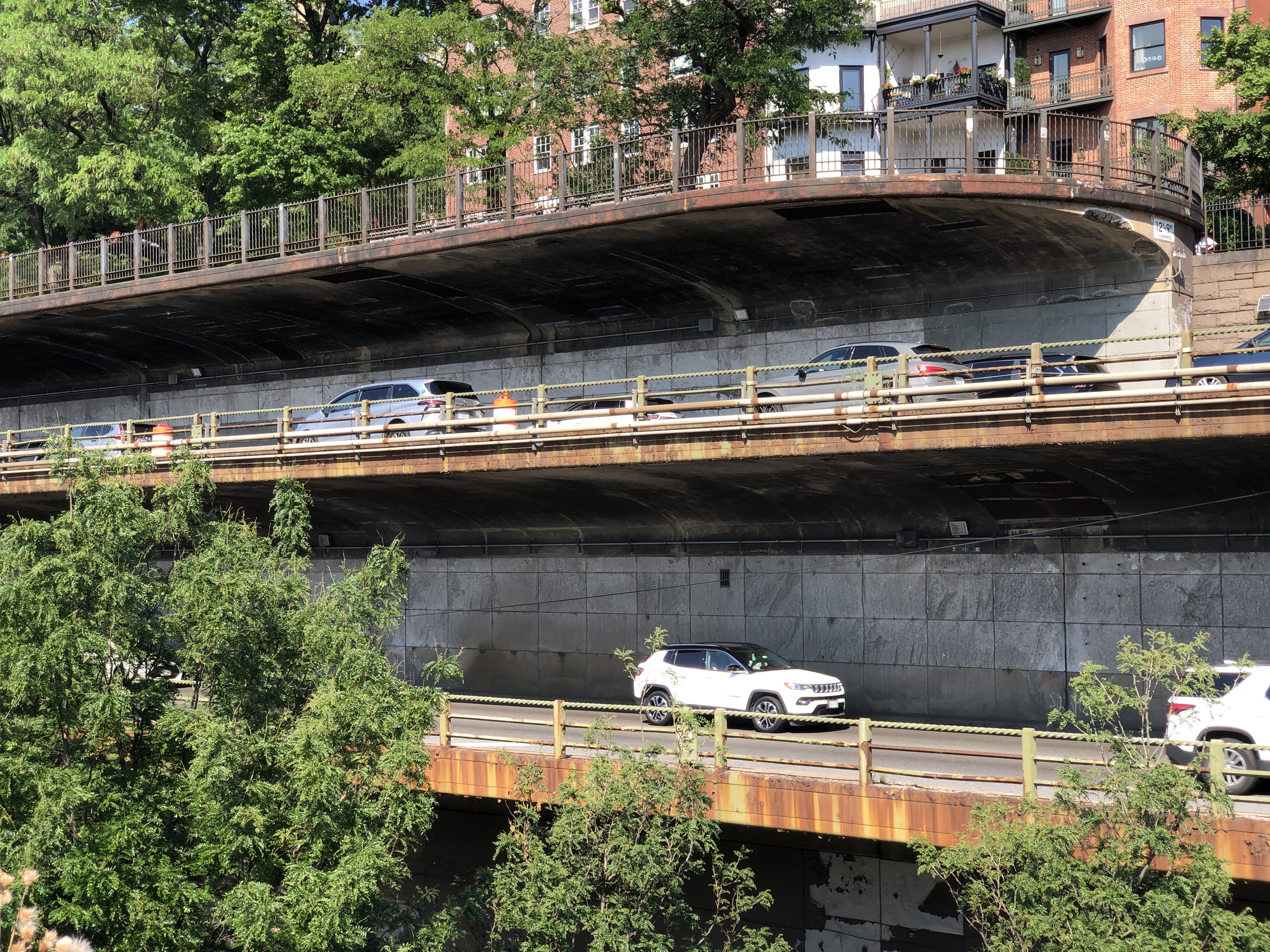
The southwest end of the Promenade, viewed from Brooklyn Bridge Park

Because of sizable opposition to demolishing the promenade, mayor Bill de Blasio later stated that his administration was open to considering other ideas, including routing the expressway over Brooklyn Bridge Park. Hundreds of people, including Brooklyn Borough President Eric Adams and City Comptroller Scott Stringer, rallied on the promenade, calling for more public review. Local residents are strongly opposed to the construction of the temporary six-lane highway as it would run right up against their homes. In response, the Brooklyn Heights Association came up with an alternate plan, which called for the construction of a temporary bilevel roadway running besides the promenade on land including a parking lot.

Support for reducing the size of or tearing down the BQE increased, with articles in New York and The Wall Street Journal calling for the removal of the highway. They noted how the removal of highways in other cities improved local neighborhoods and led to economic development. Commissioner Trottenberg had dismissed calls to tear down the highway saying that the city got most of its freight by truck and that "For better or for worse, these Moses-built highways [...] now the city has grown around them and it's not an option to just say we can't deal with that traffic." City Council Speaker Corey Johnson called for the city to study alternatives, including the removal of the BQE in its entirety, in his State of the City address. On March 13, 2019, Stringer issued a plan calling for converting the triple cantilever structure and the open cut in Cobble Hill into a truck-only highway between Hamilton Avenue in Carroll Gardens and the Brooklyn Bridge. Under the plan, only the bottom level would be rebuilt and then be decked over by a linear park and boulevard. The report expected passenger vehicles to be diverted into the underused Brooklyn–Battery Tunnel, whose tolls might be lowered when congestion pricing in New York City was implemented. In early April, de Blasio announced that he would create a panel to formally evaluate each alternative and that the panel's evaluations would end by mid-2019. In February 2020, officials proposed a three-mile (4.8 km) tunnel from the Gowanus Expressway to Flushing Avenue. The proposal was expected to cost $11 billion, to be paid by tolls.

===== 2020s work =====
In late 2021, the section between Atlantic Avenue and the Brooklyn Bridge was reduced from three to two lanes per direction, a move that city officials said could prolong the viaduct's life by 20 years. The city also planned to ticket overweight vehicles. There was still no long-term plan for the viaduct by mid-2022, but three preliminary plans for the highway's reconstruction were announced in December 2022. NYCDOT formally presented the three plans to the public in February 2023, and city officials began issuing summonses to overweight vehicles in August of that year. In February 2024, the Federal Highway Administration rejected the city's request for $800 million to redesign and rebuild the cantilever. By the next month, no design had been finalized, and the start date for the triple cantilever's reconstruction had been postponed to 2028. The vehicle restrictions had reduced the number of overweight vehicles on the cantilever by 60% by early 2025.

The city government announced a proposal in August 2026 to spend $4 billion repairing the existing cantilever over a ten-year period, which involved rebuilding existing bypass roads above Furman Street. The city also proposed rerouting the eastbound roadway onto a temporary bypass ramp over the Brooklyn Bridge while work was underway.

=== Bruckner Expressway ===
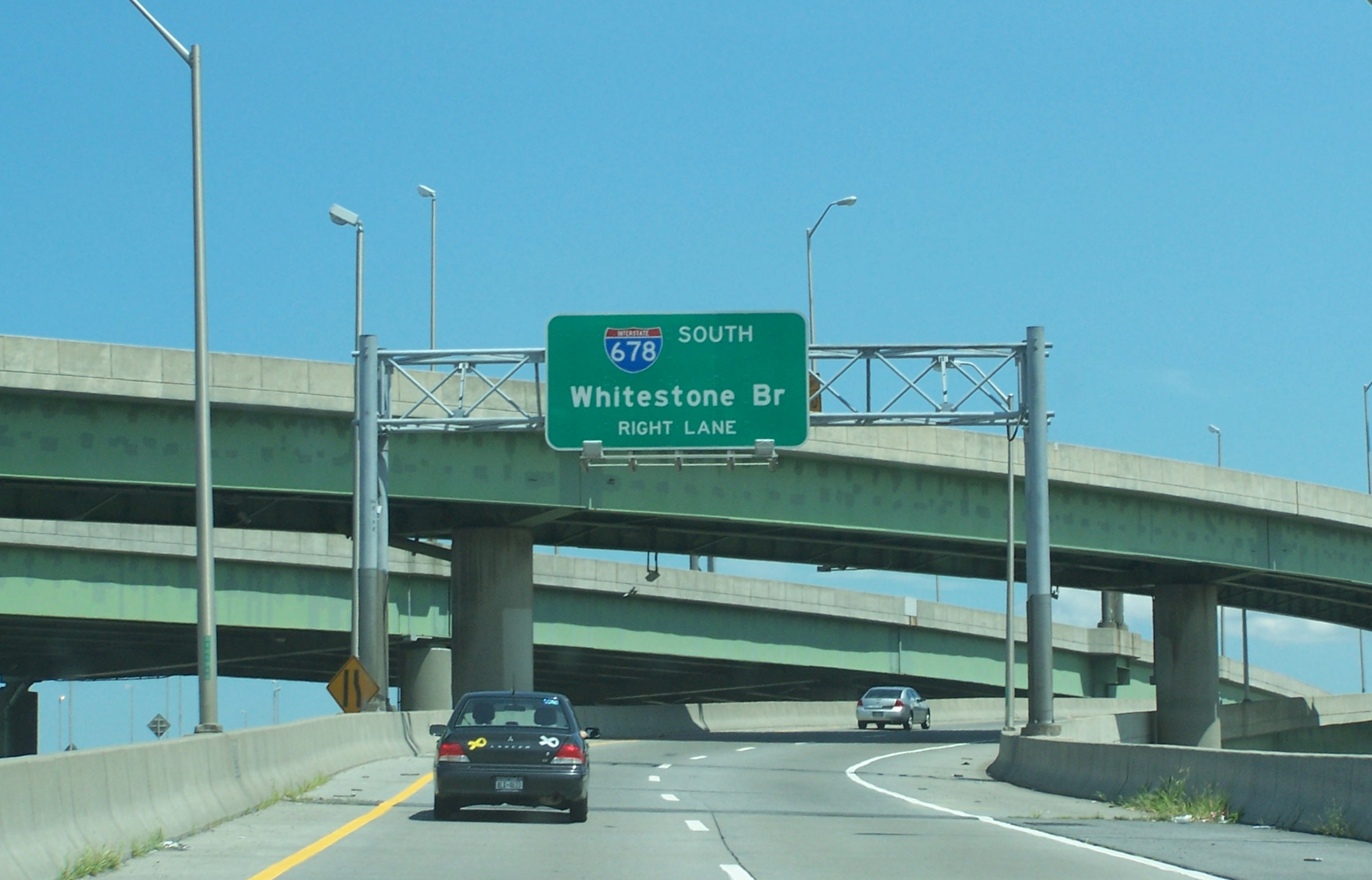
The eastern end of I-278, at the Bruckner Interchange

The Bruckner Expressway was originally Bruckner Boulevard, designated as part of NY 1A. In the 1930s, a freeway was planned on the Bruckner Boulevard alignment in order to provide a connection between the Robert F. Kennedy Bridge and a freeway leading north into Westchester County. Moses took over planning for the road in 1951 and called for an elevated freeway between the Robert F. Kennedy Bridge and the Bronx River and a depressed freeway east of there. Construction on the elevated segment of the Bruckner Expressway began in 1957 and on the depressed segment in 1959. The depressed portion was opened in 1961 while the elevated portion of the Bruckner Expressway was opened in 1962. In 1972, the large Bruckner Interchange was finished, completing the route.

Over the years, the I-278 portion of the Bruckner Expressway has had different designations. When the Interstate Highway System was first created, the road was to be part of I-895 from I-87 to the Sheridan Expressway and I-678 from there to I-95. Later, I-278 was planned to follow the Bruckner Expressway from I-87 to the Sheridan Expressway, where it would continue on that freeway to I-95, while the Bruckner Expressway was not designated an Interstate north of there. By 1970, I-278 was routed onto its current alignment, with I-895 (now NY 895) created along the Sheridan Expressway.

== Public transportation ==
Multiple express buses operated by the Metropolitan Transportation Authority operate along I-278:

- The SIM1, SIM1C, SIM2, SIM3, SIM3C, SIM4, SIM4C, SIM5, SIM6, SIM7, SIM9, SIM10, SIM11, SIM15, SIM31, SIM32, SIM33, SIM33C, SIM34 and SIM35 Staten Island express routes operate on the Staten Island Expressway, Verrazano-Narrows Bridge, and Gowanus Expressway.
- The SIM8, SIM25, SIM26 and SIM30 Staten Island express routes operate over the Goethals Bridge.
- The BM1, BM2, BM3, BM4, X27, X28, X37 and X38 Brooklyn express routes operate on the Gowanus Expressway.
- The BxM6, BxM7, BxM8, BxM9, BxM10 and BxM11 Bronx express routes operate on the Bruckner Expressway.

The S79 SBS, S53 and S93 local routes operate over the Verrazano-Narrows Bridge. In addition, the B24 local bus operates on the Kosciuszko Bridge; the Q70 SBS operates over a small section of the Brooklyn–Queens Expressway; and the M60 SBS operates on the Robert F. Kennedy Bridge.

== Exit list ==
State	County	Location	mi	km	Old exit	New exit	Destinations	Notes
New Jersey	Union	Linden	0.00	0.00			US 1-9 south	Western terminus
New Jersey	Union	Elizabeth	0.87	1.40			Brunswick Avenue – Elizabeth, Linden	Eastbound exit and westbound entrance; last eastbound exit before toll
New Jersey	Union	Elizabeth	0.99– 1.31	1.59– 2.11			I-95 Toll / N.J. Turnpike	Exit 13 on I-95 / Turnpike
New Jersey	Union	Elizabeth	0.99– 1.31	1.59– 2.11		3	Route 439 north (Bayway Avenue) to US 1-9 north – Elizabeth	Westbound exit and eastbound left entrance; signed as exits 3B (north) and 3C (east); southern terminus of Route 439; former Route 28
Arthur Kill			2.00 0.00	3.22 0.00	Goethals Bridge (eastbound toll; E-ZPass or toll-by-plate)			
New York	Staten Island	Bloomfield	1.60	2.57		4	Western Avenue	Westbound exit and eastbound entrance
New York	Staten Island	Bloomfield	1.70	2.74		4	Forest Avenue	Eastbound exit and westbound entrance; former NY 439
New York	Staten Island	Bloomfield	1.83	2.95		5	NY 440 south (West Shore Expressway) – Outerbridge Crossing	Western end of NY 440 concurrency
New York	Staten Island	Bloomfield	1.90	3.06		6	South Avenue	Westbound exit only
New York	Staten Island	Bulls Head–Graniteville line	2.04	3.28		7	Richmond Avenue	
New York	Staten Island	Bulls Head–Graniteville line	2.74– 2.93	4.41– 4.72		8 (EB); 10 (WB)	Victory Boulevard	Former NY 439A
New York	Staten Island	Bulls Head–Graniteville line	2.74– 2.93	4.41– 4.72		9	NY 440 north (Dr. Martin Luther King, Jr. Expressway) – Bayonne Bridge	Eastern end of NY 440 concurrency; exit 10E on NY 440; to Cape Liberty Cruise Port
New York	Staten Island	Manor Heights–Castleton Corners line	3.44	5.54		11	Bradley Avenue	
New York	Staten Island	Manor Heights–Castleton Corners line	4.78	7.69		12	Todt Hill Road / Slosson Avenue	
New York	Staten Island	Manor Heights–Castleton Corners line	5.00	8.05			Richmond Parkway	Unbuilt semi-directional T interchange; proposed northern terminus of Richmond Parkway
New York	Staten Island	Emerson Hill–Sunnyside line	5.73	9.22		13	Clove Road / Richmond Road / Targee Street	Signed as exits 13A (Clove Road) and 13B (Richmond/Targee) westbound
New York	Staten Island	Grasmere–Park Hill line	7.34	11.81		14	Hylan Boulevard	
New York	Staten Island	Grasmere–Rosebank line	7.58	12.20		15W	Narrows Road west to Fingerboard Road	Lower level only; westbound exit and eastbound entrance
New York	Staten Island	Grasmere–Rosebank line	7.58	12.20		15S	Lily Pond Avenue south to Father Capodanno Boulevard	Lower level only; signed as exit 15 eastbound; last eastbound exit before toll
New York	Staten Island	Grasmere–Rosebank line	7.58	12.20		15N	Bay Street – Fort Wadsworth	Lower level only; eastbound exit is via exit 15
New York	The Narrows		8.88	14.29	Verrazzano–Narrows Bridge (toll; E-ZPass or toll-by-plate)			
New York	Brooklyn	Bay Ridge	8.64	13.90		16	Belt Parkway east – John F. Kennedy International Airport	Eastbound left exit and westbound left entrance; exit 3 on Belt Parkway
New York	Brooklyn	Bay Ridge	9.84	15.84		17	92nd Street	Last westbound exit before toll
New York	Brooklyn	Bay Ridge	10.47	16.85		18	Fort Hamilton Parkway	Eastbound exit and westbound entrance
New York	Brooklyn	Bay Ridge	10.89	17.53		19	86th Street	Westbound exit and eastbound entrance
New York	Brooklyn	Sunset Park	11.18	17.99		20	6th Avenue / 7th Avenue / 65th Street	Signed for 6th Avenue westbound, 7th Avenue eastbound
New York	Brooklyn	Sunset Park	11.93	19.20		21	3rd Avenue	No westbound exit
New York	Brooklyn	Sunset Park	12.65	20.36		22	Belt Parkway east – Queens	Westbound left exit and eastbound entrance; western terminus of Belt Parkway
New York	Brooklyn	Greenwood Heights	13.92	22.40		23	38th Street / 39th Street	No entrance ramps; signed for 38th Street eastbound, 39th Street westbound
New York	Brooklyn	Greenwood Heights	14.29	23.00		24	NY 27 east (Prospect Expressway)	No westbound entrance; western terminus of NY 27
New York	Brooklyn	Red Hook	15.06	24.24	26A	25	To Hugh L. Carey Tunnel – Manhattan	No westbound exit; access via I-478
New York	Brooklyn	Red Hook	15.14	24.37	26B	26	Hamilton Avenue to Hugh L. Carey Tunnel	Access to Hugh L. Carey Tunnel via I-478; no eastbound access to Hugh L. Carey Tunnel
New York	Brooklyn	Brooklyn Heights	16.12	25.94		27	Atlantic Avenue	
New York	Brooklyn	Brooklyn Heights	16.74	26.94		28A	Cadman Plaza West	No eastbound entrance; signed as exit 28 westbound
New York	Brooklyn	Downtown Brooklyn	17.20	27.68		28B	Brooklyn Bridge	Eastbound exit only
New York	Brooklyn	Downtown Brooklyn	17.47	28.12		29A	Manhattan Bridge	No westbound exit
New York	Brooklyn	Downtown Brooklyn	18.10	29.13		29	Tillary Street – Brooklyn Civic Center, Manhattan Bridge, Holland Tunnel	No westbound entrance
New York	Brooklyn	Clinton Hill	18.68	30.06		30	Flushing Avenue	Eastbound exit and westbound entrance
New York	Brooklyn	Williamsburg	19.32	31.09		31	Wythe Avenue / Kent Avenue	Westbound exit and eastbound entrance
New York	Brooklyn	Williamsburg	19.85	31.95		32A	Williamsburg Bridge – Manhattan	Westbound left exit and eastbound left entrance
New York	Brooklyn	Williamsburg	20.41	32.85		32B	Metropolitan Avenue	No eastbound entrance; signed as exit 32 eastbound
New York	Brooklyn	Greenpoint	20.60	33.15		33	Humboldt Street / McGuinness Boulevard	Eastbound exit and westbound entrance
New York	Brooklyn	Greenpoint	21.80	35.08		34	Meeker Avenue / Morgan Avenue	Westbound exit and eastbound entrance
New York	Newtown Creek		22.10	35.57	Kosciuszko Bridge			
New York	Queens	Long Island City	21.80– 22.90	35.08– 36.85		35	I-495 (Long Island Expressway) / 48th Street / Greenpoint Avenue – Queens-Midtown Tunnel, Eastern Long Island	Signed as exits 35A (west) and 35B (east); exits 17W and 17E on I-495
New York	Queens	Woodside	23.30	37.50	36	39	NY 25 (Queens Boulevard) / 65th Place / 58th Street	Signed as exits 39E (east) and 39W (west) westbound
New York	Queens	Woodside	23.87	38.42	37	40	Broadway / Roosevelt Avenue	
New York	Queens	Jackson Heights	24.48	39.40	38	41	NY 25A (Northern Boulevard)	
New York	Queens	East Elmhurst	24.66	39.69	39	42	To Grand Central Parkway east – LaGuardia Airport	Eastbound exit and westbound entrance
New York	Queens	East Elmhurst	25.30	40.72	40	43	30th Avenue	Eastbound exit and westbound entrance
New York	Queens	Astoria	25.57	41.15	41	44	Astoria Boulevard west	Eastbound exit and westbound entrance
New York	Queens	Astoria	25.57	41.15		4	Grand Central Parkway east – LaGuardia Airport	Westbound exit and eastbound entrance; western end of Grand Central Parkway concurrency; exit number not signed
New York	Queens	Astoria	26.37	42.44	3	45	31st Street / Astoria Boulevard Grand Central Parkway ends	No eastbound access to Astoria Boulevard; western terminus of Grand Central Parkway; last eastbound exit before toll
New York	East River		27.11	43.63	Robert F. Kennedy Bridge suspension span (eastbound toll; E-ZPass or toll-by-plate)			
New York	Manhattan	Randalls Island	27.58	44.39		46A	Randalls Island, Icahn Stadium	Westbound exit only; access via Hell Gate Circle
New York	Manhattan	Randalls Island	28.18	45.35		46	Manhattan, Randalls Island	Access to Manhattan via NY 900G; access to Randalls Island via Central Road; no westbound access to Randalls Island
New York	Hell Gate		28.60	46.03	Robert F. Kennedy Bridge truss span (westbound toll; E-ZPass or toll-by-plate)			
New York	The Bronx	Port Morris	28.89	46.49	44	47	I-87 north (Major Deegan Expressway) – Albany	Southern terminus of I-87; former NY 1B; last westbound exit before toll
New York	The Bronx	Port Morris	29.49	47.46	45	48	East 138th Street	Eastbound exit and entrance
New York	The Bronx	Hunts Point				48	Leggett Avenue – Hunts Point Market	Westbound exit and entrance
New York	The Bronx	Hunts Point	30.78	49.54	46	49	NY 895 north (Sheridan Boulevard) to East 177th Street	Eastbound exit and westbound entrance; southern terminus of NY 895; former I-895
New York	The Bronx	Hunts Point	31.18	50.18		50	Tiffany Street	Westbound exit and eastbound entrance
New York	The Bronx	Soundview	31.48	50.66		51	Bronx River Avenue	Westbound exit only
New York	The Bronx	Soundview	31.58	50.82	51	52	Bronx River Parkway north – White Plains	No westbound exit; exits 2E and 2W on Bronx River Parkway
New York	The Bronx	Unionport	32.35	52.06	52	53	White Plains Road / Castle Hill Avenue	
New York	The Bronx	Throggs Neck (Bruckner Interchange)				54	I-295 south / I-678 south / Hutchinson River Parkway north / Zerega Avenue – Throgs Neck Bridge, Whitestone Bridge	Eastbound exit and westbound entrance; exit 12 on I-295; exit 19W on I-678; exit 1A on Hutchinson Parkway
New York	The Bronx	Throggs Neck (Bruckner Interchange)	33.62	54.11			I-95 north (Bruckner Expressway) – New Haven, CT	Eastern terminus; exit 6B on I-95
1.000 mi = 1.609 km; 1.000 km = 0.621 mi: Concurrency terminus; Incomplete access; Tolled; Unopened
