= Xie =

Xie may refer to:

== People ==
- Xie of Xia (泄), legendary king of the Xia Dynasty
- Xie of Shang (契), legendary nobleman
- Xie, Marquis of Jin (燮; c. 11th century BC), ruler of the State of Jin
- King Xie of Zhou (攜; c. 770 BC)
- Alexandra Kitchin (1864–1925), Lewis Carroll's friend and photo model nicknamed "Xie"
- Xie (surname) (謝), derived from the state
- Xie (surname 解)

== Places ==
- Xie (state) (謝), a state during the Zhou dynasty in modern Henan
- Xi'e (西鄂, Xī'è), a region during the Qin, Han, and Jin dynasties in modern Hubei
- Xie River (Brazil) in Amazonas
- Xie River (渫水, Xiè Shuǐ) in Shimen County, Hunan, in China
- Xie River (斜川, Xié Chuān) in ancient China, near Shaanxi's Baoxie Plank Road
- Xie River (泄水, Xiè Shuǐ) in China
- Xie River (㳦, Xiè) in China

== XIE ==
- Xavier Institute of Engineering, in Mumbai
- X Image Extension
