= Dunga (disambiguation) =

Dunga is the nickname of Carlos Caetano Bledorn Verri (born 1963), a Brazilian football player and coach.

Dunga may also refer to:

- Dunga (Catholic singer), a musician
- Dunga (name), a surname and given name
- Dunga, a synonym for Eubranchus, a genus of aeolid nudibranch molluscs

== See also ==
- Dungal (disambiguation)
- Dungan (disambiguation)
- Dungannon, a town in County Tyrone, Northern Ireland
- Dungarvan, a town in County Waterford, Ireland
