= Dongan (disambiguation) =

Dongan may refer to:

== People ==
- Donegan, an Irish surname, sometimes spelled Dongan
- Dongan Baronets, in the Baronetage of Ireland
- Dungan people, a Muslim population of Chinese origin living in central Asia

== Places ==
- Yunfu City (云浮市), Guangdong, China. From 1578 to 1913, known as Dong'an (东安县, formerly romanized as Tong On)
- Dong'an County (东安县), Yongzhou, Hunan, China
- Dong'an District (东安区), Mudanjiang, Heilongjiang, China
- Dong'an, Chongqing (东安镇), town in Chengkou County, Chongqing, China
- Dong'an, Zhucheng (东安社区), in Zhucheng Subdistrict, Xinzhou District, Wuhan, Hubei, China
- Dongan, Iran, a village in North Khroasan Province, Iran
- Dongan Hills, Staten Island, U.S.
  - Dongan Hills station
- Dongan-gu, Anyang, South Korea
- Dong'an Road station, a station on the Shanghai Metro, China

== Other uses ==
- Dong'an chicken, a Chinese cuisine cold parboiled chicken dish
- Dongan Engine Manufacturing Company, a Chinese engine manufacturer

== See also ==
- Dungan (disambiguation)
