= Grant City =

Grant City may refer to:

- Grant City, Indiana
- Grant City, Missouri
- Grant City, Staten Island, New York
  - Grant City (Staten Island Railway station)
- Grant City, the discount department store division of American retail chain W.T. Grant
