= Donegan =

Family name

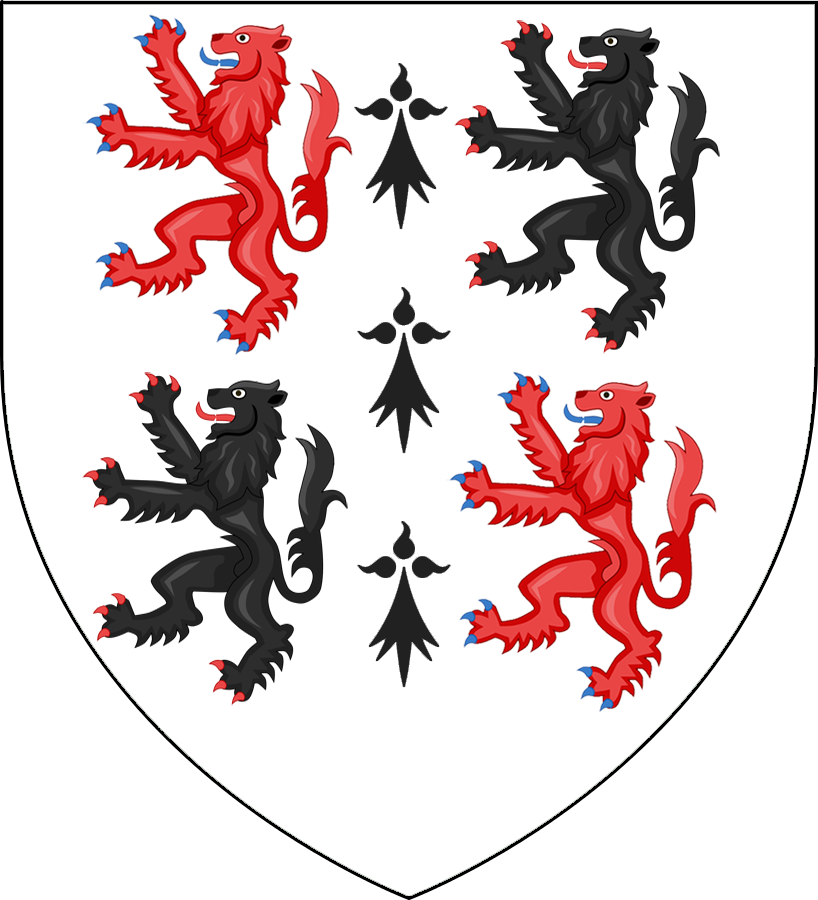
Ó Donnagáin.

Donegan (Irish: Ó Donnagáin), most commonly refers to a Gaelic Irish clan from Munster. The name is diminutive of Donn which means, "the Dark One", or in modern Irish, "brown", referring to hair colour. The most prominent dynasty were an Érainn people of the Múscraige and provided a King of Munster in the 10th century in the form of Flaithbertach mac Inmainén. Much later, the family provided the Dungan Baronets and two Earls of Limerick, the most notable of which Thomas Dongan, 2nd Earl of Limerick was a Governor of New York.

== Naming conventions ==
Numerous spelling variations of the surname Donegan exist in Anglicised form. Different spellings include Donegan, Donnegan, Doneghan, Donneghan, Donagan, Donnagan, Donnaghan, Dunegan, Dunnegan, O'Donegan, O'Dunnegan, O'Donnaghan, Dongan, Donegin, Donnegin, Donnagen, Donagen, Donnegen, Donegen, Donnigan, Donigan, Dunnican, Dunican, Dunigan, Dunnigan, Dunnagan, McDunnigan, McDonegan, Dongane, Dongan, Dongen, Dungan, and many more.

| Male | Daughter | Wife (Long) | Wife (Short) |
|---|---|---|---|
| Ó Donnagáin | Ní Dhonnagáin | Bean Uí Dhonnagáin | Uí Dhonnagáin |

== History ==
It was first found simultaneously in County Monaghan where they were anciently seated at Farney (Irish: Fearnaigh) and in County Cork where they were anciently seated at Muskerry, later moving to Limerick, Kildare, and Dublin. It is also the name of a townland in Ballyloughloe civil parish, barony of Clonlonan, County Westmeath.

According to Patrick Woulfe's Irish Names and Surnames

"The name of several distinct families in Ireland. They were chiefs of the extensive district of Ara, now the barony of Ara (or Duhara) in the north-west of County Tipperary, and of Ui Cuanach, now the barony of Coonagh in County Limerick. They are frequently mentioned in the Annals during the 11th and 12th century, but after the Anglo-Norman invasion they began to decline and soon disappeared from history. Their territory in later times was occupied by a branch of the O'Briens, the chief of which was styled Mac I Brien Ara. The O'Donegans of Cork were anciently chiefs of the Three Plains, now the barony of Orrery in the neighborhood of Rathluirc. Their patrimony was granted by King John of England to William de Barry, under the name of Muskerry-Donegan. There were in ancient times, three distinct families of O'Donegans in Ulster, and the name is still extant in that province. The O'Donegans were numerous at the end of the 16th century in the midlands and in North Connacht; and though by no means common, the name is at the present found in all provinces."

Variations of the spelling, including Duigenan, Duignan, Dignan, Dignam, and Degnan, may derive from another Irish family, the Clan Ó Duibhgeannáin of County Roscommon and County Leitrim.

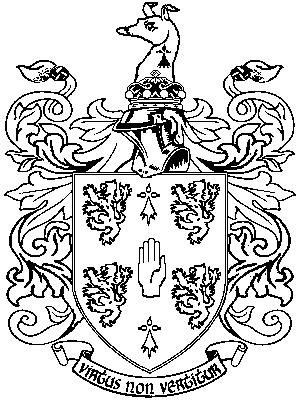
The coat of arms of the Dunnigan's of Ulster in given by TMH Lt Col John Dunnigan to genealogist William Fraser in 1717. The family crest is the Ermine in its animal form with an embedded heraldic ermine within. The shield contains four lions rampant with an ermine atop and below the red right hand of Ulster with the family motto "Virtus non vertitur" (Valour does not turn) beneath.

Dinnegan is an anglicized form of the Gaelic Irish surname Ó Duinnegáin which itself is a variant of Ó Donnagáin. As Dinnegan it is found almost exclusively in County Longford especially Ballymahon where the family is a branch of Ó Donnagáin of Westmeath, where the name is usually anglicized as (O')Donegan and Dongan.

The "census" of 1659 and the Fiants of 1540 to 1601 show that in the seventeenth century the name was numerous in the barony of Rathconrath, County Westmeath and in the barony of Athlone. There were a good number in County Sligo also, whereas two or three generations earlier O'Donegans were found not only in west Leinster but also to an equal extent in County Cork and adjacent parts of Munster.

The Ó Donnagáin's of Ulster ruled in the Kingdom of Fernmhagh/Fernmag (meaning "plain of alders") as far back as records go. The Barony of Farney, County Monaghan developed from the remnant of and derives its name from the medieval kingdom. The Annals of Loch Cé record the death in 1029 of "Donnchadh Ó Donnagáin King of Fermanagh, son of Iáin Ó Donnagáin, King of Oriel and Bréifne"; and in 1113 of "Ó Donnagáin royal heir" thereof.

Notable after the loss of Fermanagh and the clan's relocation to their Castletown property was Chief John Donegan (died 1413), a medieval Manx prelate who provided for the clan through his large ecclesiastical estates. After holding the position of Archdeacon of Down, he held three successive bishoprics, Mann and the Isles (Sodor) where the Castletown branch of the family and their Manx variation of the surname, "Dunnigan", is common to this day. His son, Jon Dunnigan (died 1435) notable in his own right only as the commander of a company of Mercenaries from Mann and the Isles in Italy. Since the birth of his son, John Dunnigan (Born 1416) John/Jon has been the name of the eldest son of the family.

Another distinguished member of the Castletown family was Thomas Dongan (1595–1663), younger brother to The Much Honored Sir John Dunnigan (1590–1669), Laird of Drumbreddan. And therefore uncle to the TMH Sir John Dunnigan who fought under William III in the battle of the Boyne as an officer in the Ulster Protestant "skirmishers", with whom he had partaken in holding Derry the previous year. Thomas was himself a lawyer who, after being reduced to dire poverty and disowned by his family by the aftermath of the Rising of 1641, became a Baron of the Exchequer at the Restoration. Thomas' branch of the family would hold Dunegan Castle in County Westmeath is a few miles northeast of Athlone.

The Westmeath O'Donegans, who held the manor of Kildrought, County Kildare, from the Earls of Kildare, were also established in Leix and Offaly, where their territory was formerly known as Críoch Dungan (i.e. Dungan's or O'Donegan's country). Of this family was Thomas Donegan or Dongan Earl of Limerick, framer of the celebrated New York Dongan Charter of 1686. His elder brother the first Earl was attainted as a Jacobite in 1691. Their father was Sir John Dunnigan, Bart., of Castletown, County Kildare.

== List of people ==
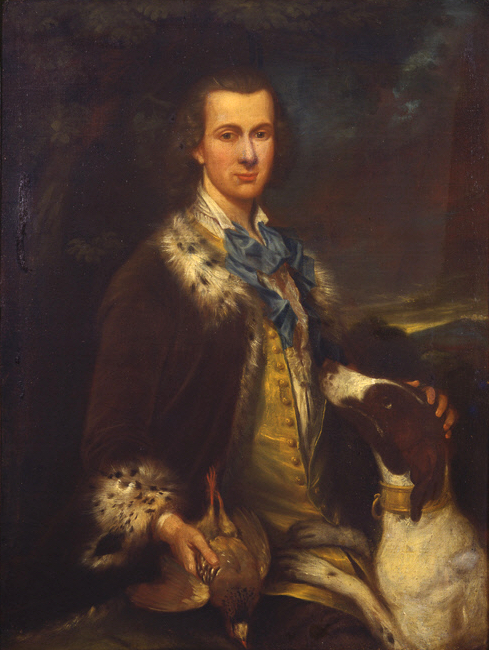
Thomas Dongan, 2nd Earl of Limerick.

=== Donegan ===
- Amy Donegan (born 1999), English artist
- Barry Donegan (born 1978), American singer and songwriter
- Batt Donegan (1910–1978), Irish politician
- Cheryl Donegan (born 1962), American artist
- Dan Donegan (born 1968), American musician
- Dorothy Donegan (1922–1998), jazz pianist
- Edward Donegan, American bootlegger
- Horace William Baden Donegan (1900–1991), English prelate
- John Donegan (born 1960), Irish physicist
- Lawrence Donegan (born 1961), musician and journalist
- Lonnie Donegan (1931–2002), skiffle musician
- Maurice Donegan (Irish republican) (1899–1974)
- Maurice F. Donegan (1875–1950), American judge
- Paddy Donegan (1923–2000), Irish politician

=== Dongan ===
- John Dongan (fl. 1368–1413), Manx prelate
- Thomas Dongan (judge) (1590–1663), Irish judge, great-uncle of Thomas Dongan, 2nd Earl of Limerick
- Thomas Dongan, 2nd Earl of Limerick (1634–1715), member of Irish Parliament and Governor of New York State

=== Dungan ===
- David Laird Dungan (1936–2008), American biblical scholar
- Ellis R. Dungan (1909–2001), American film director
- George Dungan III (born 1988), American politician from Nebraska
- James I. Dungan (1844–1931), American politician from Ohio
- Myles Dungan (born 1954), Irish broadcaster
- Sam Dungan (1866–1939), American baseball player
- Sebastian Dungan, 21st-century American film producer
- Troy Dungan (born 1936), American weatherman
- Warren S. Dungan (1822–1913), American politician and lawyer from Iowa

=== Dunigan ===
- Matt Dunigan (born 1960), quarterback
- Michael Dunigan (born 1989), basketball player
- Tim Dunigan (born 1955), actor
- Ricky Dunigan, known as Lord Infamous, co-founder of Three 6 Mafia

=== Dunnigan ===
- Alice Allison Dunnigan (1906–1983), civil rights activist
- Jim Dunnigan (born 1943), author and wargame designer
- JJ Dunnigan (born 2008), American football player
- John J. Dunnigan (1883–1965), President pro tempore of the NY State Senate 1933–1938
- Kyle Dunnigan (born 1971), comedian
- Pat Dunnigan (1894–1937), All-American and professional football player

== Places ==
- Dunnegan, Missouri
- Dongan Hills, Staten Island, neighborhood located within New York City, USA's borough of Staten Island
- Dongan Hills (Staten Island Railway station), railway station at Dongan Hills
- Dunnigan, California, a small town in the United States
- Dunnigan Hills, a mountain range in Yolo County, California
  - Dunnigan Hills AVA, California wine region in Yolo County

== Other ==
- Ó Duibhgeannáin
