= Dangal =

Dangal may refer to:

- Dangal, a type of Indian pehlwani wrestling competition usually held in an akhara
- Dangal (2016 film), a Hindi-language Indian film
  - Dangal (soundtrack)
- Dangal (1977 film), an Indian Bhojpuri-language film
- Dangal (TV channel), an Indian TV channel
- Dangal (TV series), Philippine television drama
- Dangal language, a language of Chad
- Dangal dialect (Austronesian), a variety within the Watut language complex of Papua New Guinea
- Dangal, Iran, a village in Iran

== See also ==
- Danggal language, of Papua New Guinea
- Dangle (disambiguation)
- Dungal (disambiguation)
- Dagnall (disambiguation)
