= Dungan =

Dungan may refer to:

- Dungan people, a group of Muslim people of Hui origin
  - Dungan language
  - Dungan, sometimes used to refer to Hui people generally
- Dungan Mountains in Sibi District, Pakistan
- Donegan, an Irish surname, sometimes spelled Dungan

== See also ==
- Dongan (disambiguation)
- Dungan revolt (disambiguation)
- Battle of Dungan's Hill, Ireland, 1647
