= Dunga (name) =

Dunga is a surname and given name. Notable people with the name include:

== Surname ==
- Ismael Dunga (born 1993), Kenyan footballer

== Nickname ==
- Dunga (born 1963), Brazilian football player and manager
- Dunga (Catholic singer) (born 1964), Brazilian singer, songwriter, preacher, writer, radio broadcaster and television presenter
- Dunga Ram Rajoria (fl. 1962–1980), Indian politician
- Dunga Rodrigues (1908–2001), Brazilian teacher, musician, memoirist and author
