= Old Town station (Staten Island Railway) =

Staten Island Railway station

Old Town
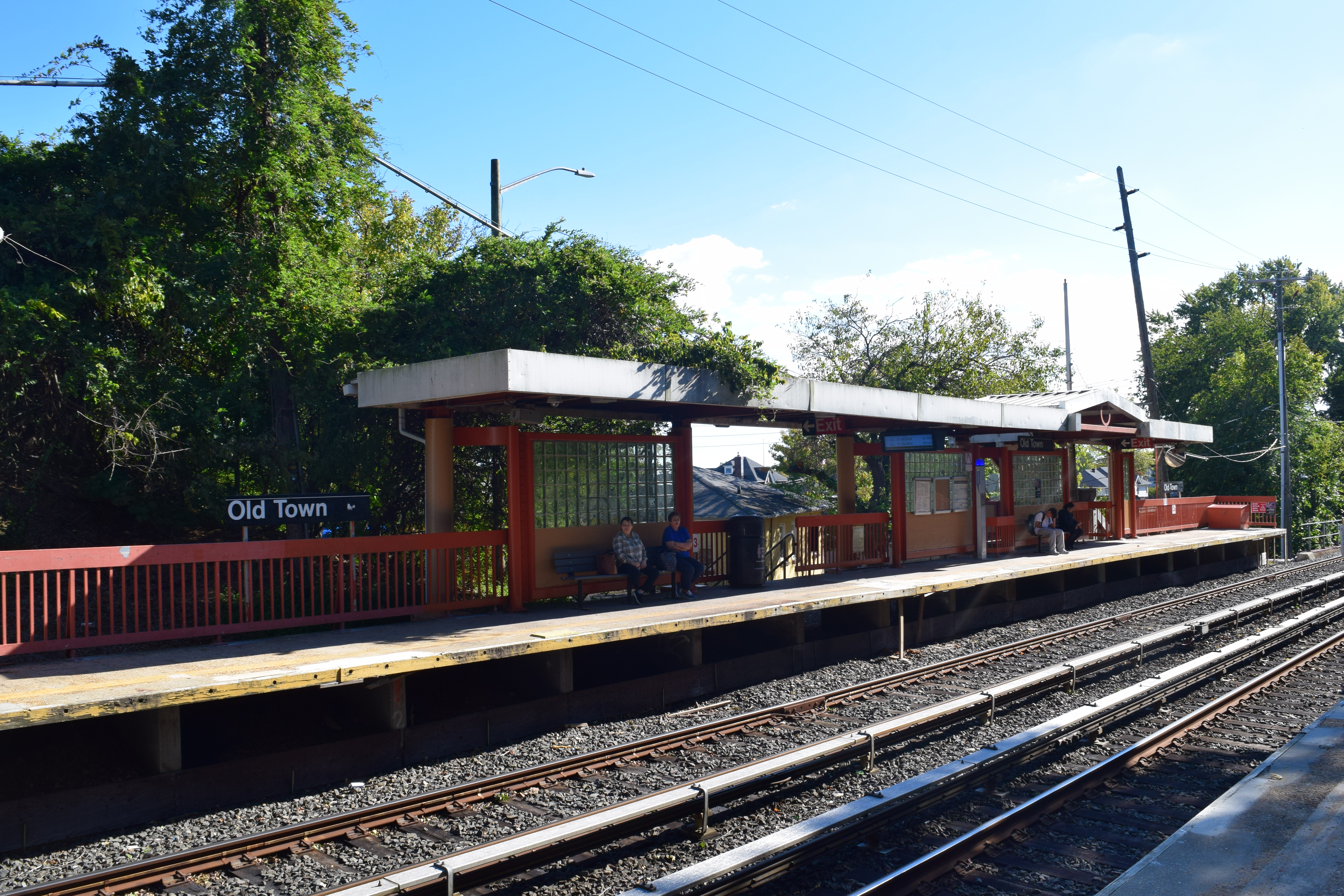
- Northbound platform

General information
- Location: Old Town Road and North Railroad Avenue; Old Town, Staten Island
- Coordinates: 40.5964°N 74.0875°W
- Platforms: 2 side platforms
- Tracks: 2
- Connections: NYCT Bus: S78, S79 SBS, SIM1, SIM7, SIM10, SIM11

Construction
- Structure type: Embankment

Other information
- Station code: 506

History
- Opened: 1937; 89 years ago (Note: The opening date for this station can be approximated using contemporaneous maps and tikets. This ticket from 1935 shows that the Old Town station has not yet opened. A map of the Staten Island Rapid Transit Railway Company dated to January 11, 1937 shown here: does not show the Old Town, Jefferson Avenue or Lake Avenue stations. However, another map with the same date shows these stations with a few additional modifications. It seems that the second map was a revised version of the first one. Presumably it was printed to correct the old information, which did not show these stations. Finally, this ticket from 1938: does show the station.)
- Former names: Old Town Road

Services
Preceding station	Staten Island Railway	Following station
Grasmere toward St. George	Staten Island Railway	Dongan Hills toward Tottenville
Track layout
Location

The Old Town station is a Staten Island Railway station in the neighborhood of Old Town, Staten Island, New York.

== History ==
The station opened toward the beginning of 1937, likely during a grade crossing elimination project. The original name of the station was "Old Town Road"; the "Road" was dropped soon after the Metropolitan Transportation Authority assumed control of the Staten Island Railway from the Baltimore and Ohio Railroad in 1971 (the MTA concurrently shortened the name of the Huguenot Park station to simply "Huguenot").

== Station layout ==
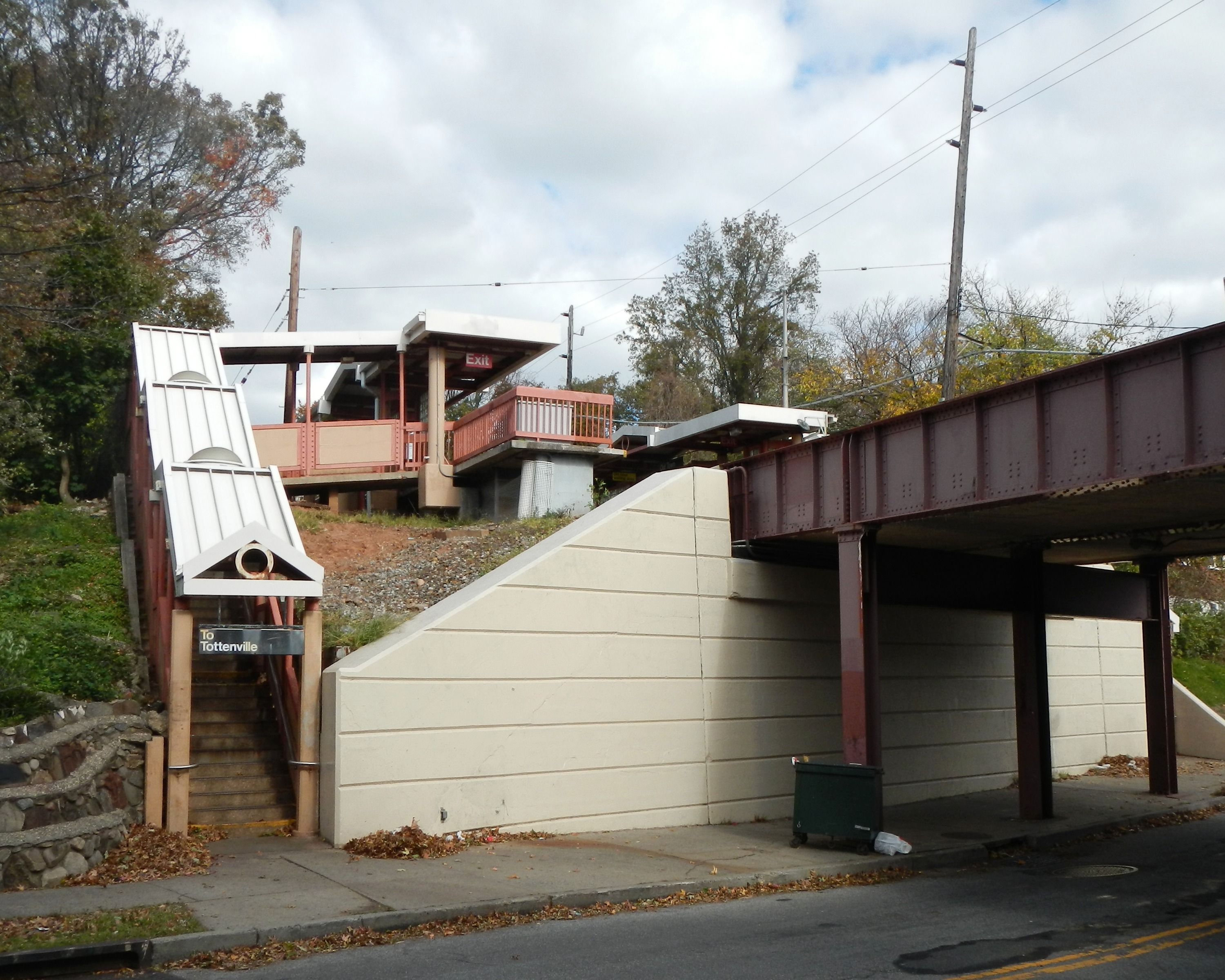
Southbound stair

The station is located on an embankment at Railroad Avenue on the main line. It has two side platforms, and metal orange canopies and walls. Just north of this station, a spur that had multiple purposes and served the press building of the Staten Island Advance newspaper is nowadays used as a storage spur for ballast cars.

Platform level	Side platform
Platform level	Southbound	← toward Tottenville (Dongan Hills) ← rush hour express does not stop here
Platform level	Northbound	toward St. George (Grasmere) → AM rush express does not stop here →
Platform level	Side platform
Ground	Street level	Exit/entrance, buses

=== Exits ===
The exit at the south end leads to Old Town Road. An additional staircase at the north end of the northbound platform leads to a roadway to Dawson Place and Oregon Road.
