= Jefferson Avenue station =

Staten Island Railway station

Jefferson Avenue
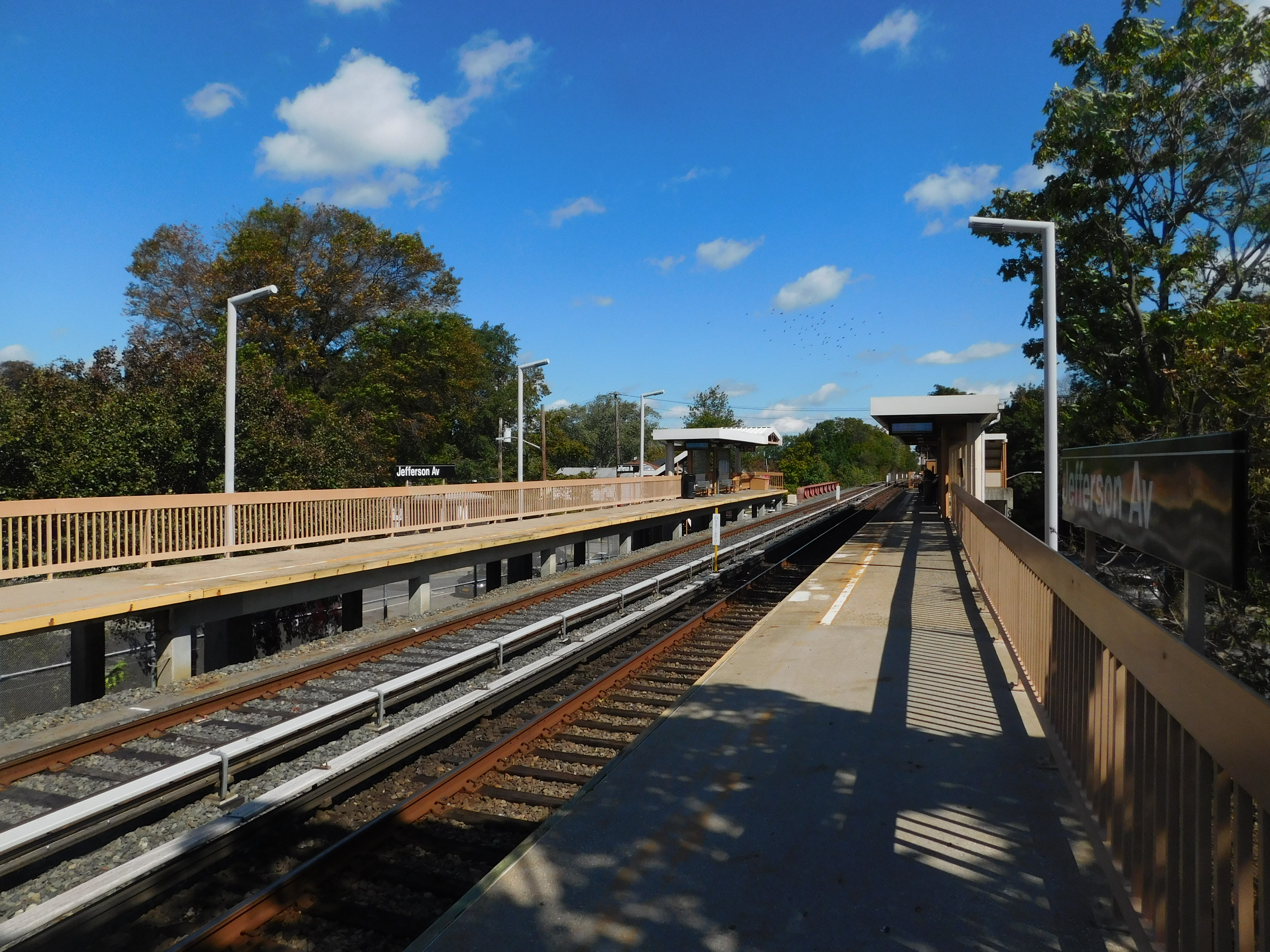
- Jefferson Avenue station in September 2020

General information
- Location: Jefferson Avenue and North Railroad Avenue; Midland Beach, Staten Island
- Coordinates: 40.5838°N 74.1030°W
- Platforms: 2 side platforms
- Tracks: 2

Construction
- Structure type: Embankment

Other information
- Station code: 508

History
- Opened: 1937; 89 years ago (Note: The opening date for this station can be approximated using contemporaneous maps and tickets. This ticket from 1935 shows that the Jefferson Avenue station has not yet opened. A map of the Staten Island Rapid Transit Railway Company dated to January 11, 1937 shown here: does not show the Old Town, Jefferson Avenue or Lake Avenue stations. However, another map with the same date shows these stations with a few additional modifications. It seems that the second map was a revised version of the first one. Presumably it was printed to correct the old information, which did not show these stations. Finally, this ticket from 1938: does show the station.)
- Rebuilt: 1965–1968

Services
Preceding station	Staten Island Railway	Following station
Dongan Hills toward St. George	Staten Island Railway	Grant City toward Tottenville
Track layout
Location

The Jefferson Avenue station is a Staten Island Railway station between the neighborhoods of Grant City and Dongan Hills, in Staten Island, New York.

== Station layout ==
The station opened in 1937. Prior to 1965, the Jefferson Avenue crossing was at grade level. It only had a single warning bell for approaching trains. In the mid-1960's, construction began on eliminating the crossings from Jefferson Avenue to New Dorp. The track was displaced onto South Railroad Avenue and the station as well as the crossing were temporarily relocated to Adams Avenue. Jefferson Avenue and the adjacent intersections were dropped below grade and the current station was built.

Currently, the station is located on an embankment at Jefferson Avenue and Railroad Avenue on the main line. This station has two side platforms. From north to south, Jefferson Avenue station begins the descent from the embankment to the open cut.

This is the only station on the Staten Island Railway that is named for the street it serves rather than the neighborhood.

Platform level	Side platform
Platform level	Southbound	← toward Tottenville (Grant City) ← rush hour express does not stop here
Platform level	Northbound	toward St. George (Dongan Hills) → AM rush express does not stop here →
Platform level	Side platform
Ground	Street level	Exit/entrance, buses

=== Exit ===
The only exit is at the northeast end, which leads to Jefferson Avenue. There is no station house.
