= Dagnall (disambiguation) =

Dagnall is a village in England, UK.

The name may also refer to:

- Bob Dagnall
- Charles Dagnall
- Chris Dagnall
- Harry Dagnall
- Ken Dagnall
- Thompson Dagnall

== See also ==
- Dangal (disambiguation)
