= Dangle =

Dangle, dangler or dangling may refer to:

- Dangler (plot device), an unresolved plot line in a story
- Dangle (espionage), an agent of one side who pretends to be interested in defecting to another side
- Dangle, a type of earring
- Dangle, in ice hockey, a variety of moves where a player dekes (fakes) out a goalie or player (it originally meant to skate fast with the puck)
- Dangle, in lacrosse, a complete defeat of a defender or goalie achieved by performing complex stick moves and tricks
- Dangle (surname)
- Dangle®️ an industrial training and rope access services company based in Belfast, Northern Ireland

== See also ==
- Dangling bond, an unsatisfied valence on an immobilized atom
- Dangling else, a problem in the programming of parser generators
- Dangling modifier (or dangling participle), a type of misplaced grammatical phrase
- Dangling pointer (computing), a pointer not pointing to a valid object
