= Dungal (disambiguation) =

Dungal may also refer to:

== People ==
- Dungal of Bobbio
- Dungal MacDouall
- Dúngal Eilni mac Scandail
- Dúngal mac Amalgado
- Dúngal mac Cellaig
- Dúngal mac Fergaile
- Dúngal mac Selbaig, also known as Dungal of Dalriada
- Dubgall mac Somairle, also known as Dungal, Dúngal, and Dùnghal
- Dúngal mac Flainn, king of Fir Chúl, slain at the battle of Daim Deirg with Indrechtach mac Dungalaig in 743

== Places ==
- Dungal, Guinea-Bissau, near Badancar
- Reyhan Shahr, formerly Dungal, a city in Iran

== See also ==
- Dangal (disambiguation)
