= Grant City, Staten Island =

Neighborhood in New York City

Coordinates: 40°34′45″N 74°06′29″W

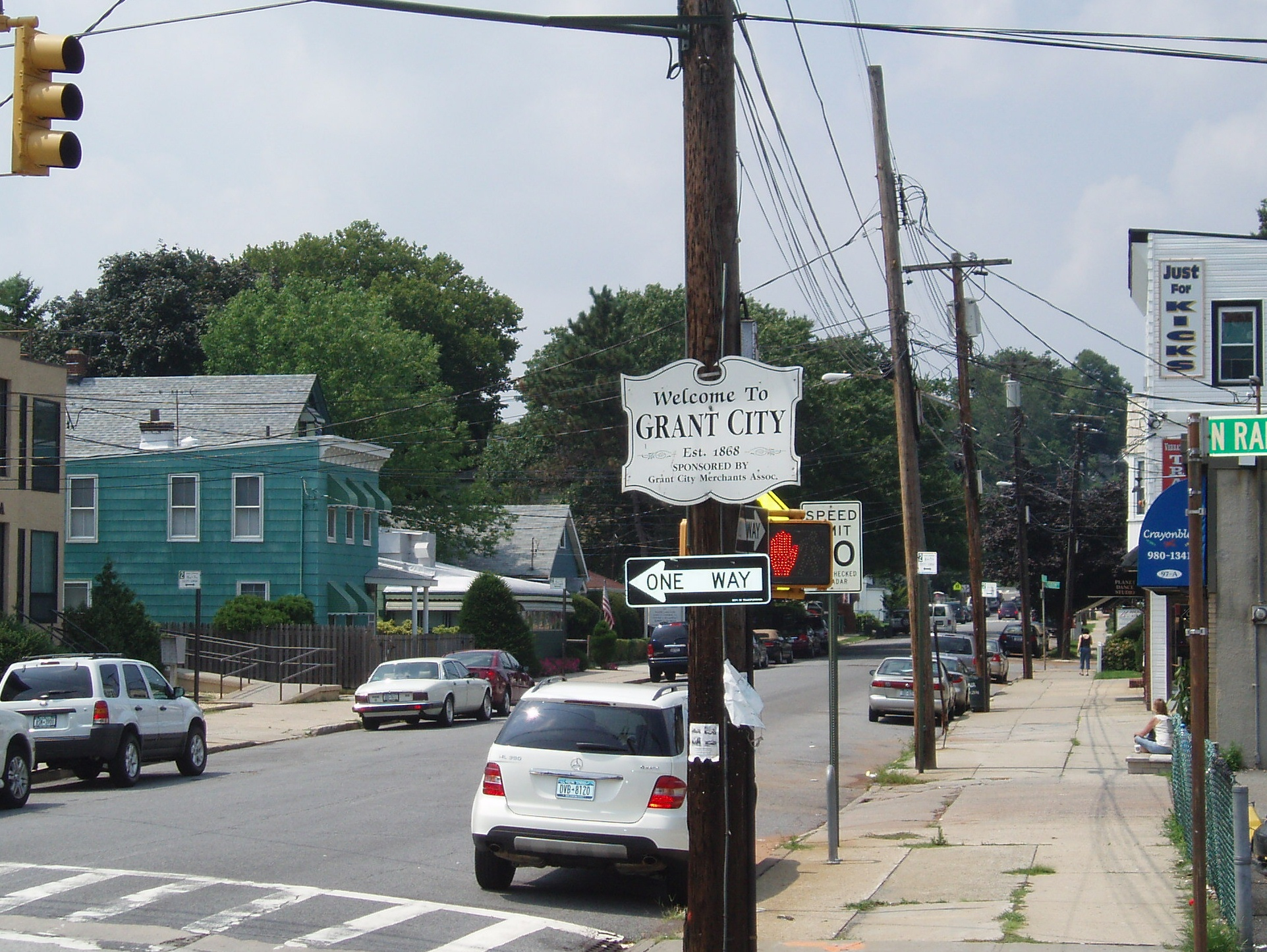
Welcome sign at Lincoln and North Railroad Avenues

Grant City is a neighborhood located on the East Shore of Staten Island, New York City.

To the east of Grant City lies Midland Beach, and a high cliff to the west of Richmond Road separates Grant City from Todt Hill. New Dorp is situated immediately south of Grant City. Dongan Hills is situated to the north.

== History ==
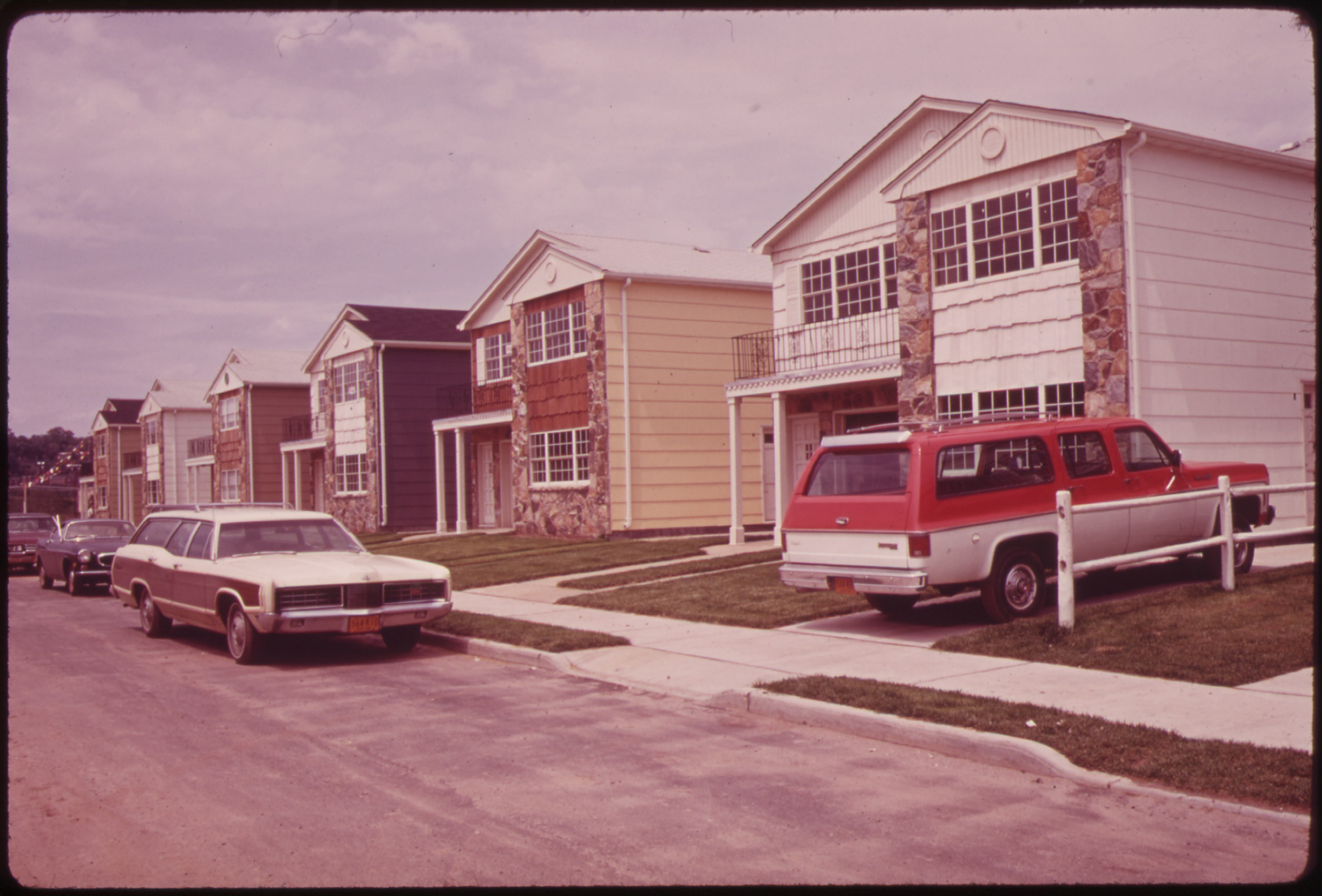
New housing in Grant City, 1973. Photo by Arthur Tress.

Originally known as Frenchtown, the community was renamed in honor of Civil War General Ulysses S. Grant soon after the conflict began, despite the fact that the war itself was so unpopular on Staten Island that the island was the scene of anti-draft riots in July 1863. The area is also referred to as just "Grant" [sic] in the official New York State Gazetteer, maintained and published by the New York State Department of Health, which includes numerous defunct hamlets and towns, some with alternate or archaic spellings.

Many of the streets are named after historical figures such as Lincoln Avenue (after President Abraham Lincoln), Fremont Avenue (after General John C. Fremont who was the first Republican candidate for president, as well as a Staten Island resident, in 1856), Adams Avenue (after President John Adams), Colfax Avenue (after Vice President Schuyler Colfax) and Greeley Avenue (after newspaper editor Horace Greeley). Many other streets were originally named after historical figures but those streets have been renamed.

Many small, one-family homes were built in Grant City in the 1950s, with a stronger growth spurt occurring after the opening of the Verrazzano–Narrows Bridge in November 1964 made access to the island from Brooklyn much easier. There was a heavy population of Irish Americans, especially in the 1990s. Grant City and the neighborhoods surrounding it are also very conservative politically, with Republican Party candidates for most elected offices.

== Notable events ==
In August 1990 an F0 tornado made its way north along Fremont Ave. in Grant City, toppling 100-plus year old trees and causing widespread damage.

== Transportation ==
Grant City is served by the S51 and S81 along Midland Avenue and Lincoln Avenue, the S74, S76, S84, S86 and SIM15 along Richmond Road, and the S78 and S79 SBS along Hylan Blvd. It is also served by express buses SIM1, SIM1C, SIM5, SIM6, SIM7 and SIM10 along Hylan Boulevard.

The Grant City station on the Staten Island Railway serves the community. The station immediately to the north is located at Jefferson Avenue, near the boundary between Grant City and neighboring Dongan Hills.
