= Grasmere station =

Staten Island Railway station

Grasmere
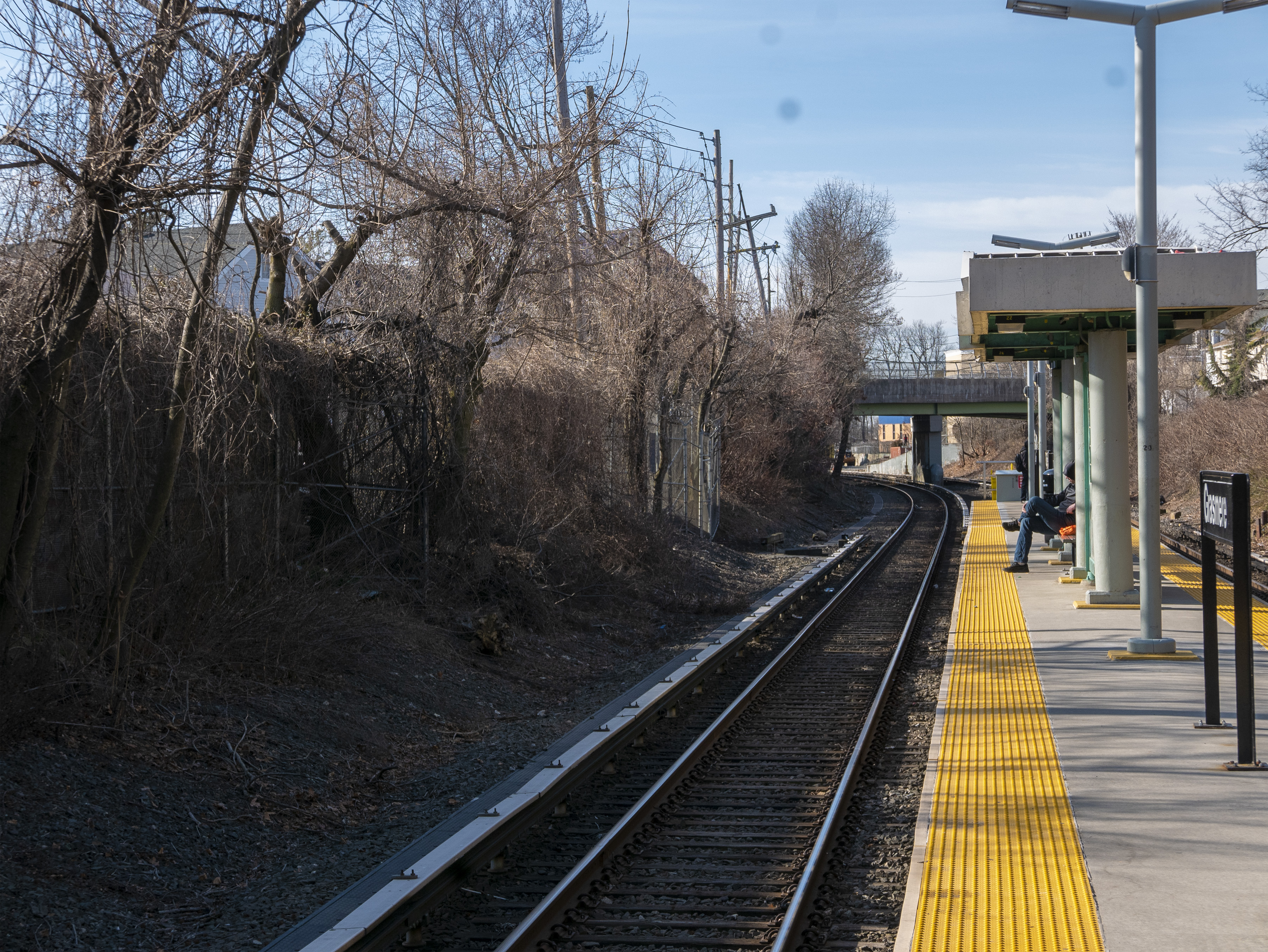
- Platform and northbound track

General information
- Location: Clove Road and Giles Place; Grasmere, Staten Island
- Coordinates: 40.60347°N 74.08378°W
- Platforms: 1 island platform
- Tracks: 2
- Connections: NYCT Bus: S53

Construction
- Structure type: Open-cut

Other information
- Station code: 505

History
- Opened: c. 1886; 140 years ago

Services
Preceding station	Staten Island Railway	Following station
Clifton toward St. George	Staten Island Railway	Old Town toward Tottenville
Track layout
Location

The Grasmere station is a Staten Island Railway station in the neighborhood of Grasmere, Staten Island, New York. It is located at Clove Road on the Main Line.

== History ==
The station opened in 1886 for a cost of $555.35.

Rehabilitation of Grasmere station began on May 21, 2012. The construction included demolition and rebuilding of the station platform and station house. A temporary platform and entrance were built north of the main station. Construction was finished in April 2014.

== Station layout ==
The platform is located in an open cut and has glass block and concrete windscreens attached to the canopy supports.

The Grasmere crossover, consisting of two manual switches, was located just past the Fingerboard Road overpass north of the station, but has since been removed. North of this station, the line merges with the abandoned South Beach Branch. The branch was closed on March 31, 1953 due to poor ridership and the SIRT's financial issues.

G	Street level	Exit/entrance, parking, buses
P Platform level	Southbound	← toward Great Kills or Tottenville (Old Town) ← rush hour express does not stop here
P Platform level	Island platform
P Platform level	Northbound	toward St. George (Clifton) → AM rush express does not stop here →

=== Exit ===
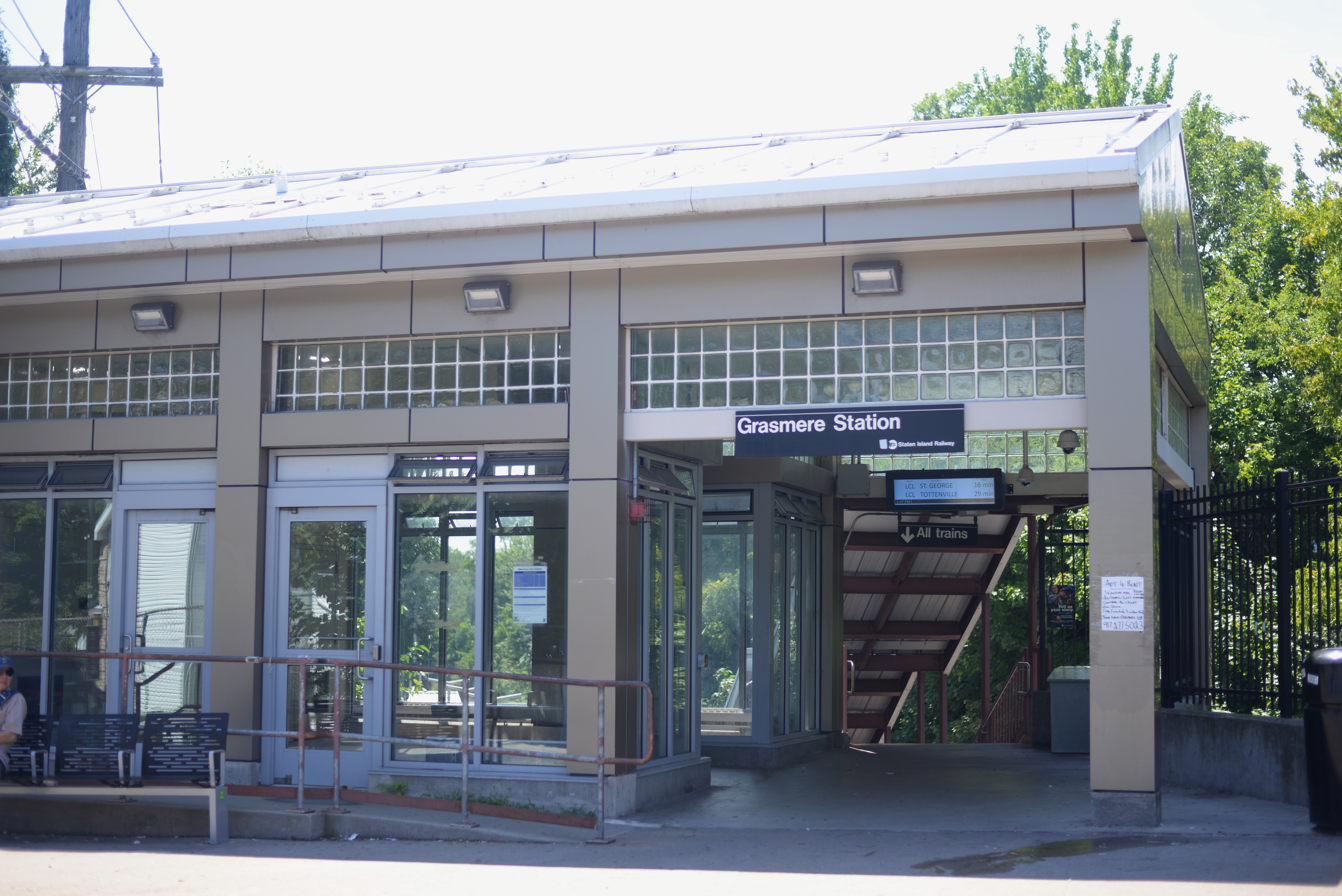
The station's exit and headhouse

The Grasmere station's only exit is at the north end of the station, and leads to the southern side of Clove Road. This station had the original brick station house from the 1933 grade separation project, located over the Tottenville-bound track at the south end of the line, however it was demolished and replaced with a modern headhouse in the 2010s. The building is open only during the morning rush hour.
