= Harry Dagnall =

British philatelist

Radford Henry (Harry) Dagnall MA, AKC, FRPSL, (23 October 1914 – 9 March 2012) was a British philatelist and fellow of The Royal Philatelic Society London who made a lifetime's study of some of the by-ways of philately with a special interest in revenue philately.

He was educated at The King's School, Canterbury and King's College London. Dagnall's heyday as a philatelic writer was in the 1970s and 80's and his work was mostly in the form of pamphlets and short monographs on diverse subjects which caught his attention. His history of the British government Stamp Office, however, Creating a Good Impression, was a longer work published by H.M. Stationery Office in 1994 to coincide with their 300th anniversary. In 1991, Dagnall's sight began to seriously fail and he gave up active philately at that time, though he continued to write as much as he could. A bibliography of his work was prepared during his lifetime by Ian D. Crane for private circulation and a bound copy was placed in the library of the Royal Philatelic Society.

Outside philately, Dagnall was a technical writer in the patent department of the British Tabulating Machine Company which became ICT and ICL. He made frequent contributions to The Communicator, the journal of the Institute of Scientific and Technical Communications and also wrote on architecture, Biblical history and xerographic printing. He was a regular contributor to The Quarterly, the journal of The British Association of Paper Historians, with whom one of his works was jointly published in 1998 and he also contributed to journals as diverse as The Thai Times and The Wallpaper History Review.

== Selected publications ==
- John Dickinson and his Silk Thread Paper. Harry Dagnall, 1975.
- Postman's Park & its Memorials. Harry Dagnall, Edgware, 1987.
- Paper Duty Labels: their history, background and use. Harry Dagnall, Edgware, 1988.
- Post Horse Tickets: their historical background, purpose & use. Harry Dagnall, Edgware, 1988. (With John H. Chandler)
- Creating a Good Impression: three hundred years of The Stamp Office and stamp duties. HMSO, London, 1994. ISBN 0116414189
- The Taxation of Paper in Great Britain 1643-1861: A history and documentation. Harry Dagnall & The British Association of Paper Historians, Edgware, 1998. ISBN 0951549774
- Taxation of the Printed Word: The introduction of stamp duty on almanacs and newspapers 1711 and 1712. Harry Dagnall, Edgware, 1999. ISBN 0951549782
