= Badancar =

- Village
- Location in Guinea-Bissau
- Coordinates: 12°34′0″N 15°20′0″W
- Country: Guinea-Bissau
- Region: Oio Region
- Sector: Farim
- Time zone: UTC+0 (GMT)

Badancar is a village in the Oio Region of northern Guinea-Bissau. It is located to the south of Dungal, Guinea-Bissau.
