= Dungan revolt =

Dungan revolt may refer to:

- Dungan Revolt (1862–1877), rebellion of various Muslim ethnic groups in Shaanxi and Gansu, China
- Dungan Revolt (1895–1896), rebellion of various Muslim ethnic groups in Qinghai and Gansu, China
