= Grant City station =

Staten Island Railway station

Grant City
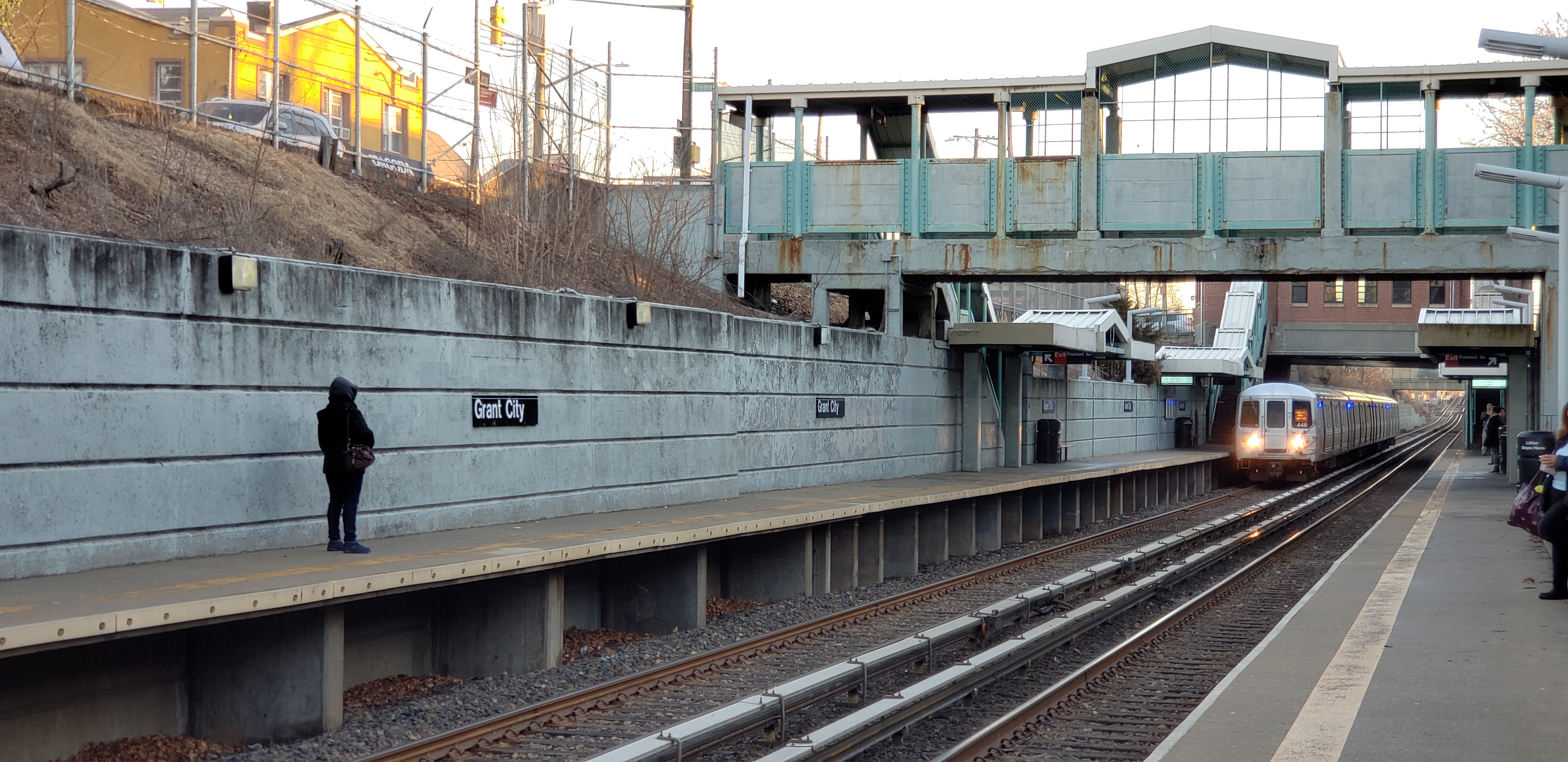
- Station platforms, pedestrian crossover, and stationhouse

General information
- Location: Lincoln Avenue and North Railroad Avenue; Grant City, Staten Island
- Coordinates: 40.5793°N 74.1093°W
- Platforms: 2 side platforms
- Tracks: 2
- Connections: NYCT Bus: S51

Construction
- Structure type: Open-cut

Other information
- Station code: 509

History
- Opened: April 23, 1860; 166 years ago
- Rebuilt: 1965–1968

Services
Preceding station	Staten Island Railway	Following station
Jefferson Avenue toward St. George	Staten Island Railway	New Dorp toward Tottenville
Track layout
Location

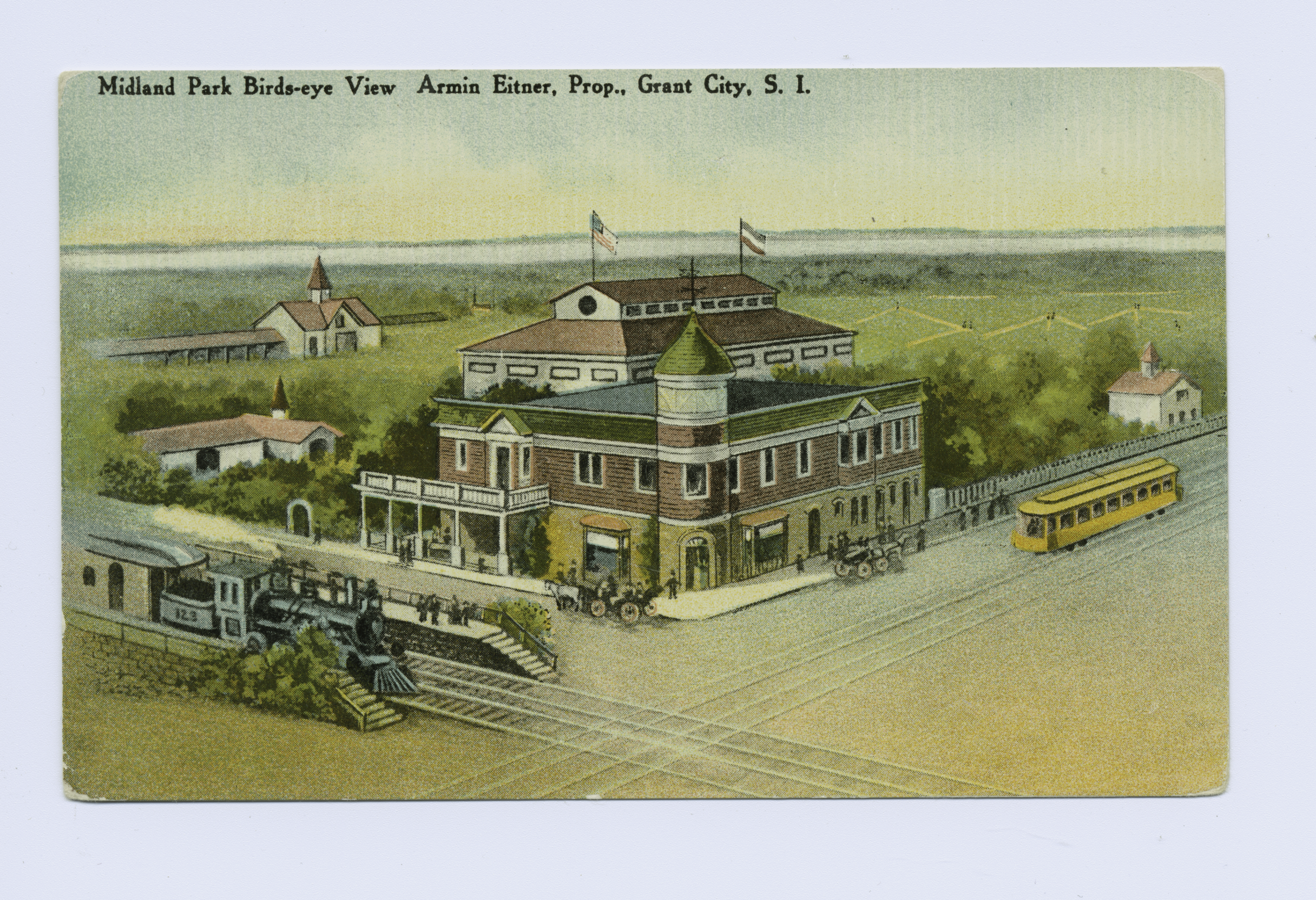
Grade crossing, early 20th century

The Grant City station is a Staten Island Railway station in the neighborhood of Grant City, Staten Island, New York.

== History ==
The station opened on April 23, 1860, with the opening of the Staten Island Railway from Vanderbilt's Landing to Eltingville. Prior to 1965, the Grant City station was at grade level. In 1964, construction began on eliminating the crossings from Jefferson Avenue to New Dorp. The tracks were displaced onto South Railroad Avenue and the station was relocated during the construction.

== Station layout ==
Currently, the station is located on an open cut at Lincoln Avenue and Railroad Avenue on the main line. It has two side platforms and aqua green walls.

Mezzanine	Overpass	Exit/entrance, connection between platforms
Ground	Street level	Station house, exit/entrance, buses
Platform level	Side platform
Platform level	Southbound	← toward Tottenville (New Dorp) ← rush hour express does not stop here
Platform level	Northbound	toward St. George (Jefferson Avenue) → AM rush express does not stop here →
Platform level	Side platform

=== Exits ===
There are two exits; the main exit at the south end leads to Lincoln Avenue and has brick a station house on street level. There are two benches inside the station house. The secondary exit at the middle of this station leads to Fremont Avenue on both sides with an overpass to connect both platforms.
