= Dunga Ram Rajoria =

Indian politician

Dungaram Rajoria is an Indian politician who represented Dausa in the Rajasthan Legislative Assembly. As a member of the SWT political party, Rajoria won election in 1962. However, he failed to find success in the 1980 election.

He was married to Mathra Devi.
