= Dangle (surname) =

Dangle is a surname. Notable people with the surname include:

- Lloyd Dangle, American writer and artist
- Steve Dangle (born 1988), Canadian sports analyst, author, and internet/hockey personality
- Lt. Jim Dangle, a Reno 911! character

== See also ==
- Marcel Dangles (1899–1974), French footballer
