= Edward Donegan =

American laborer

Edward Donegan was a casual or odd-job laborer in 1919 who became a millionaire within about four months through bootlegging following the implementation of National Prohibition of alcohol in the U.S. in January 1920. Through the use of an insider within the Bureau of Prohibition, he was able to illegally withdraw alcohol from warehouses ostensibly for legal purposes himself and also to sell fraudulent permits to other bootleggers.

Donegan’s activities were discovered after he attempted to bribe Internal Revenue Service agents who called upon him in connection with another investigation. He was convicted of possessing stolen property and the intent to defraud the United States.
