= Dongan Hills station =

Staten Island Railway station

Dongan Hills
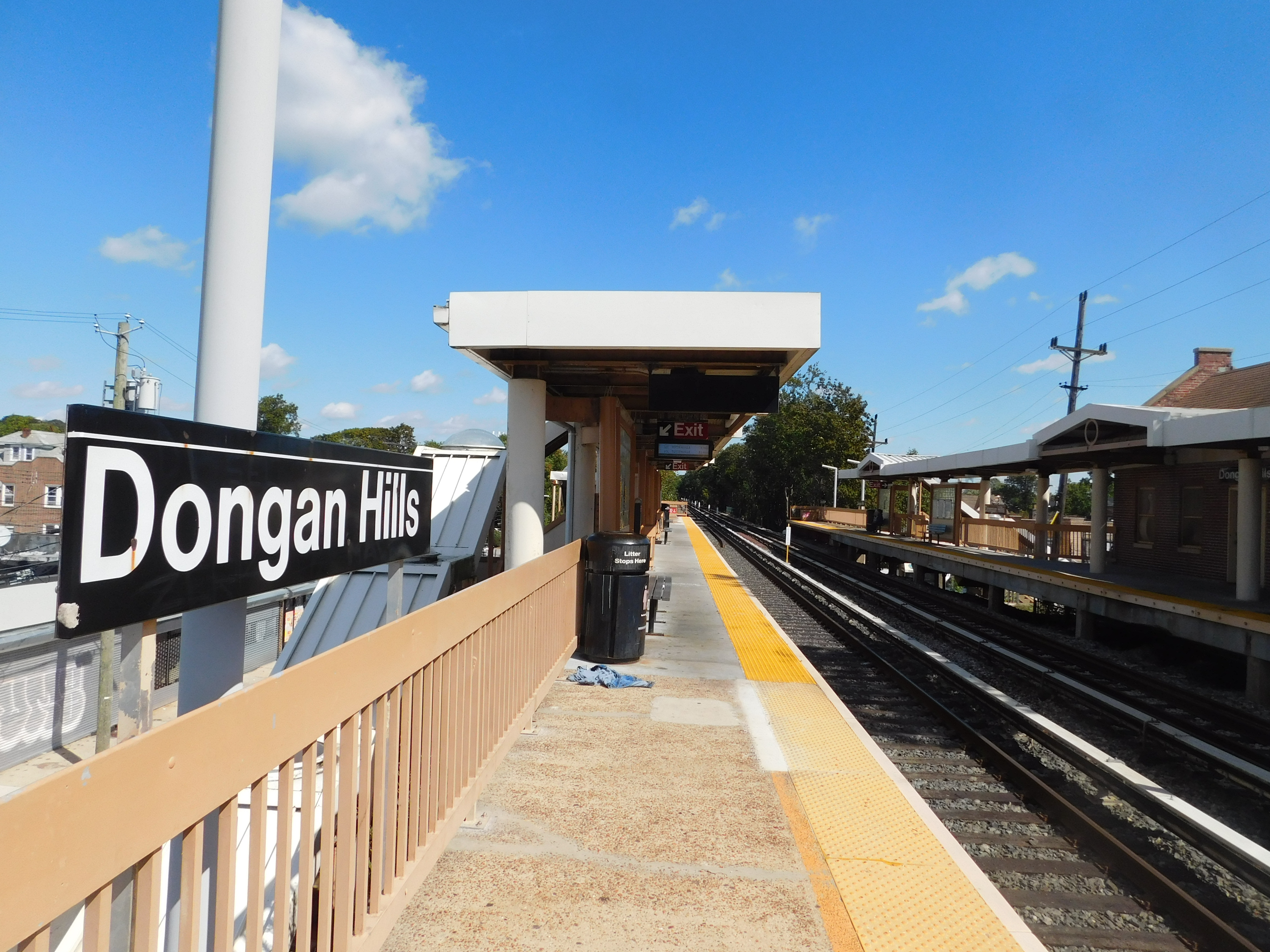
- Dongan Hills station in September 2020

General information
- Location: Seaview Avenue and North Railroad Avenue; Dongan Hills, Staten Island
- Coordinates: 40.5890°N 74.0959°W
- Platforms: 2 side platforms
- Tracks: 2

Construction
- Structure type: Embankment
- Accessible: Yes

Other information
- Station code: 507

History
- Opened: April 23, 1860; 166 years ago
- Rebuilt: 1933
- Former names: Garretson's

Services
Preceding station	Staten Island Railway	Following station
Old Town toward St. George	Staten Island Railway	Jefferson Avenue toward Tottenville
Track layout
Location

The Dongan Hills station is a Staten Island Railway station in the neighborhood of Dongan Hills, Staten Island, New York.

== History ==
The station opened on April 23, 1860, with the opening of the Staten Island Railway from Vanderbilt's Landing to Eltingville.

The station's original name was Garretson's, named after the original name of the neighborhood of the same name. The station's name changed after the neighborhood was renamed Dongan Hills. The name Garretson still can be found as there is a street that passes under the station. Both names appeared on the October 16, 1921 timetable. On February 21, 1907, the Staten Island Railway petitioned the Public Service Commission (PSC) to get permission to move the Dongan Hills stop from its location south of Seaview Avenue to a location 100 feet (30 m) to the north in between Seaview Avenue and Garretson Avenue. On March 12, 1907, the PSC granted its permission.

== Station layout ==
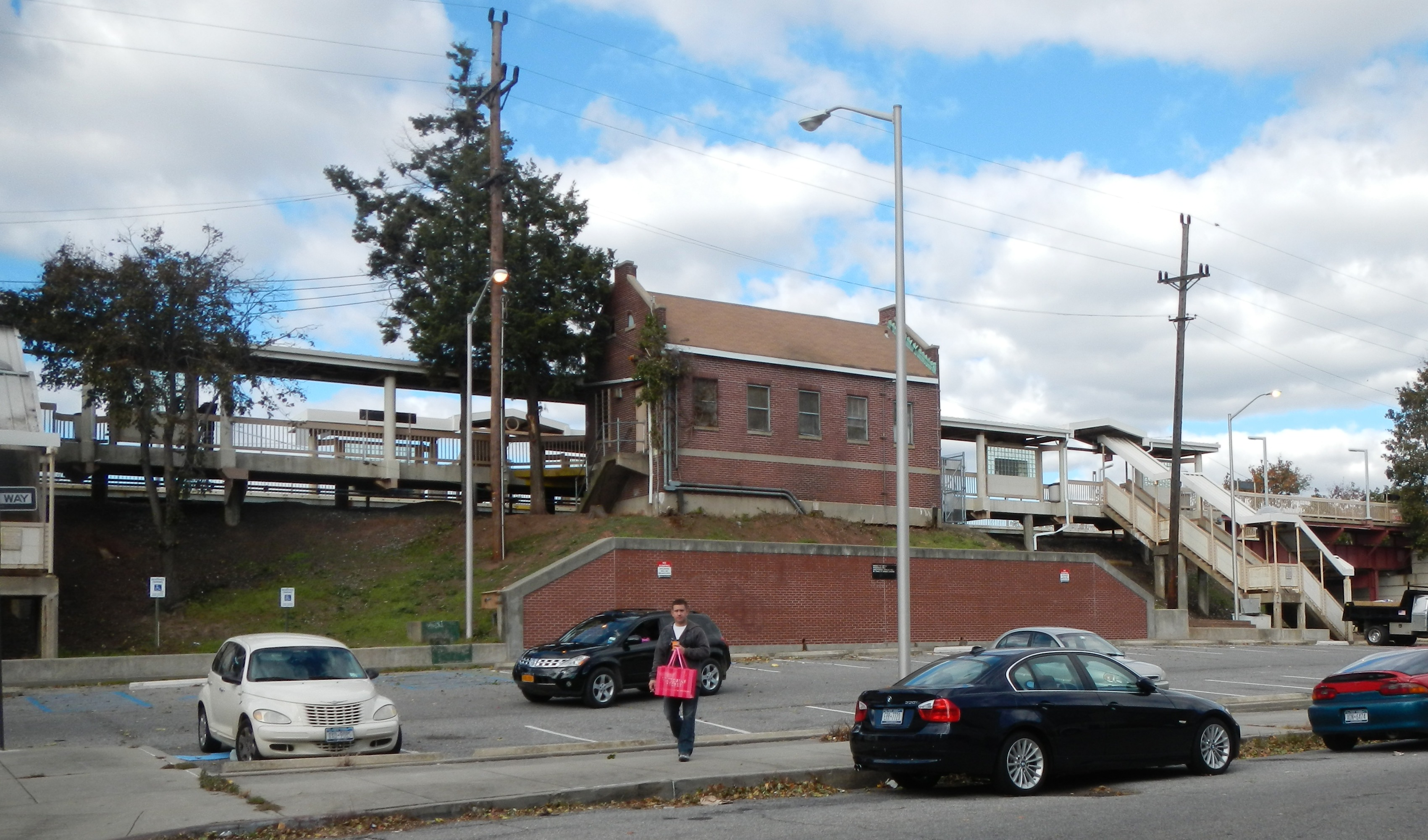
Parking lot and station house

The station is located on an embankment at Seaview Avenue and Railroad Avenue on the main line. It has two side platforms and beige canopies.

The marble wall at street level on the south end is a legacy of when the line was converted from grade level to the current embankment level today. The grade separation took place in 1933. Free parking is available on a small lot adjacent to the northbound platform, which is owned by the MTA, the agency that controls the rail line. The brick station house is unusually positioned on the northbound side at platform level, unlike other SIR station houses, which are usually located on street level. The Dongan Hills station house had a ticket booth and benches until 1987, and then a vending machine for tokens until July 4, 1997 when the fare was eliminated for all stations south of St. George.

South of this station, there is an additional third track that once served a coal distributor. Grates between the rails led to chutes which now open into the backyards of homes that run alongside the embankment.

Platform level	Side platform
Platform level	Southbound	← toward Tottenville (Jefferson Avenue) ← rush hour express does not stop here
Platform level	Northbound	toward St. George (Old Town) → AM rush express does not stop here →
Platform level	Side platform
Ground	Street level	Exit/entrance, buses, station house, parking Ramps on both sides of the station

=== Exits ===
There are staircases at the north end that lead to Garretson Avenue. The Dongan Hills station is handicapped accessible in compliance with the Americans with Disabilities Act of 1990, with ramps at the south end that lead to the southern side of Seaview Avenue. Stairs also lead from each platform to the northern side of Seaview Avenue.
