= Hylan Boulevard express buses =

Bus routes in Staten Island and Manhattan, New York

sim1, sim1c, sim7, sim10, sim11
- Hylan Boulevard Line
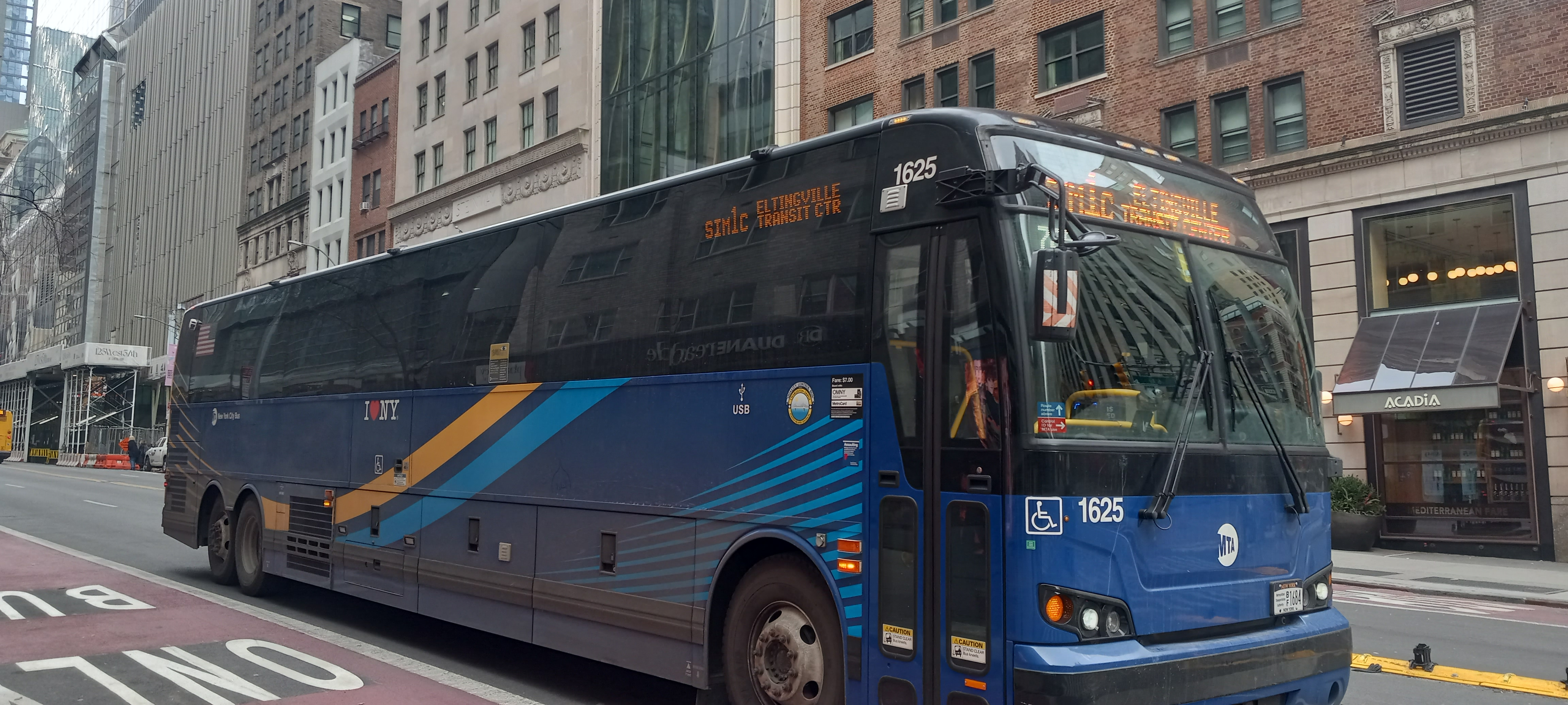
- A 2022 Prevost X3-45 (1625) on the Eltingville-bound SIM1C in Midtown

Overview
- System: MTA Regional Bus Operations
- Operator: New York City Transit Authority
- Garage: Yukon Depot
- Vehicle: Prévost X3-45

Route
- Locale: Staten Island and Manhattan, New York, U.S.
- Communities served: Eltingville, Great Kills (SIM1, SIM1C, SIM7, SIM10), New Dorp, Dongan Hills (all routes) Downtown Manhattan (SIM1, SIM1C, SIM7) Greenwich Village (SIM7) Midtown Manhattan (SIM1C, SIM10, SIM11)
- Start: Eltingville – Eltingville Transit Center (SIM1, SIM1C, SIM7, SIM10), New Dorp (SIM11)
- Via: Richmond Avenue (SIM1, SIM1C, SIM7, SIM10); Hylan Boulevard (all routes); Church Street, Broadway (SIM1, SIM1C); West Street (SIM7); Sixth Avenue/Broadway (SIM7, SIM1C); Fifth Avenue (SIM10, SIM1C); Madison Avenue (SIM11)
- End: SoHo – Houston at Broadway (SB) Houston St at Sixth Avenue (NB) (SIM1); Greenwich Village – Fourteenth Street at Broadway (SB) Fourteenth Street at Sixth Avenue (NB) (SIM7); Midtown Manhattan – Fifty-Ninth Street at Sixth Avenue (SIM10, SIM1C); Midtown Manhattan – Fifty-Seventh Street at Third Avenue (SIM11)

Service
- Operates: Rush hours (SIM1, SIM7, SIM10, SIM11); 24 hours (SIM1C)
- Annual patronage: 1,678,680 (SIM1/SIM1C, 2025); 159,976 (SIM7, 2025); 443,429 (SIM10, 2025); 212,586 (SIM11, 2025)
- Transfers: Yes
- Timetable: SIM1/1C; SIM7; SIM10; SIM11

The SIM1, SIM1C, SIM7, SIM10, and SIM11 bus routes constitute a public transit line in Staten Island and Manhattan, New York. The routes all operate on Richmond Avenue and Hylan Boulevard on Staten Island, but go to three separate terminals in Manhattan.

The SIM1 goes to 6th Avenue and Houston Street, the SIM7 goes to Sixth Avenue and 14th Street, the SIM1C and SIM10 go to Central Park South and Sixth Avenue, and the SIM11 goes to 57th Street and Third Avenue. The SIM1, SIM7, SIM10, and SIM11 operate during the rush hour only. The SIM1C operates 24 hours per day, but does not run in the peak direction during rush hours.

The SIM1, SIM7, SIM10, and SIM1C are based at Yukon Depot.

== Current route ==
All four routes start at the Eltingville Transit Center in Eltingville, Staten Island. They use Richmond Avenue through Eltingville. They then turn left on Hylan Boulevard, passing through the neighborhoods of Great Kills, New Dorp, and Dongan Hills. They then turn right on Narrows Road, before getting on the Verrazzano–Narrows Bridge. They use the Gowanus Expressway and the Brooklyn–Battery Tunnel to get to Manhattan.

=== SIM1 ===
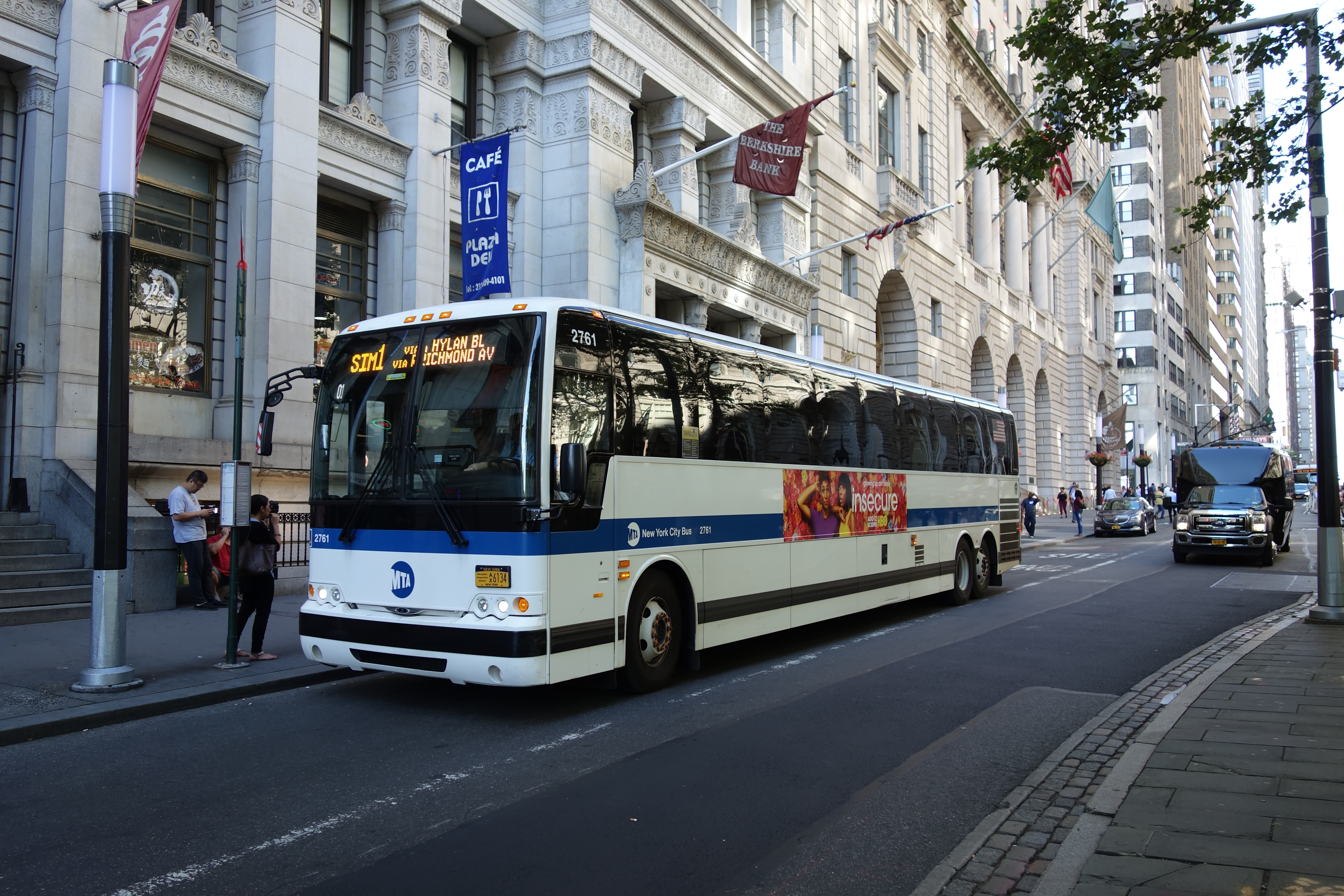
A 2016 Prevost X3-45 (2761) on the Eltingville-bound SIM1 at Bowling Green in August 2018

The SIM1 uses Battery Place to access the one-way pair of Church Street northbound and Broadway. The route's northern terminus is Houston Street.

=== SIM7 ===
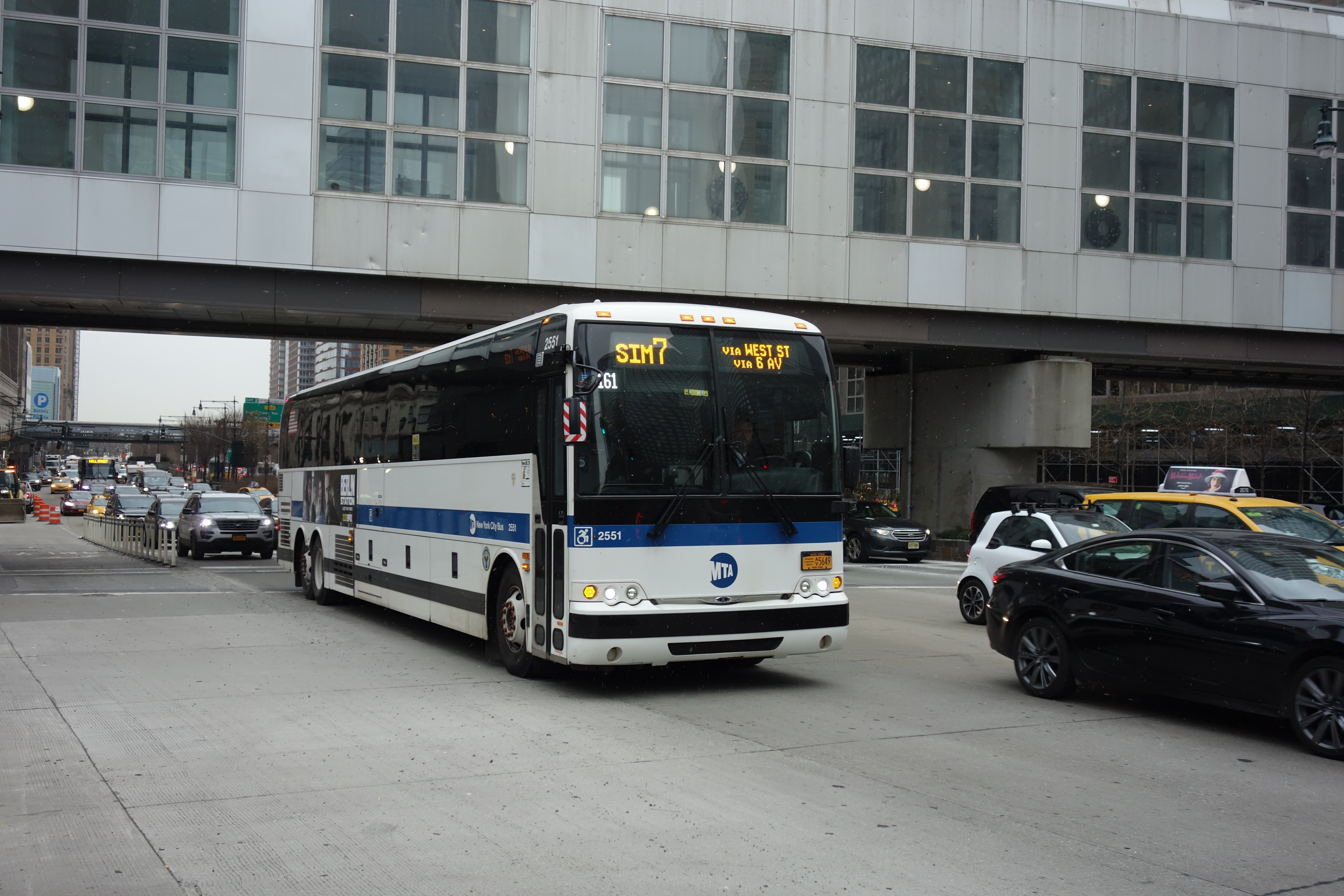
A 2015 Prevost X3-45 (2551) on the Greenwich Village-bound SIM7 at Liberty Street/West Street near Battery Park City in December 2018.

The SIM7 exits the tunnel onto West Street. Immediately before the tunnel, southbound buses do a loop on Murray Street, North End Avenue, and Vesey Street to serve World Financial Center. The route continues on West Street, turning east onto Spring Street and then north onto Sixth Avenue. Northbound buses terminate at 14th Street and Sixth Avenue. Southbound buses originate at 13th Street and Broadway, then continue south on Broadway until they turn west onto Houston Street. At West Street, southbound SIM7 buses follow the northbound route to the Battery Tunnel.

=== SIM10 ===
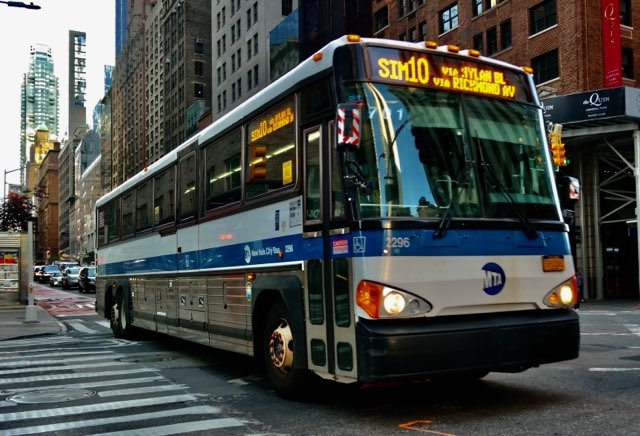
A 2013 MCI D4500CT (2296) loaned from Charleston Depot operating on the SIM10 to Eltingville Transit Center.

The SIM10 operates through the Battery Park Underpass to access the FDR Drive, turning west at 23rd Street and north onto Sixth Avenue. It terminates at 59th Street. Southbound, the SIM10 uses Fifth Avenue, 23rd Street, and the FDR Drive to the Battery Tunnel.

=== SIM1C ===
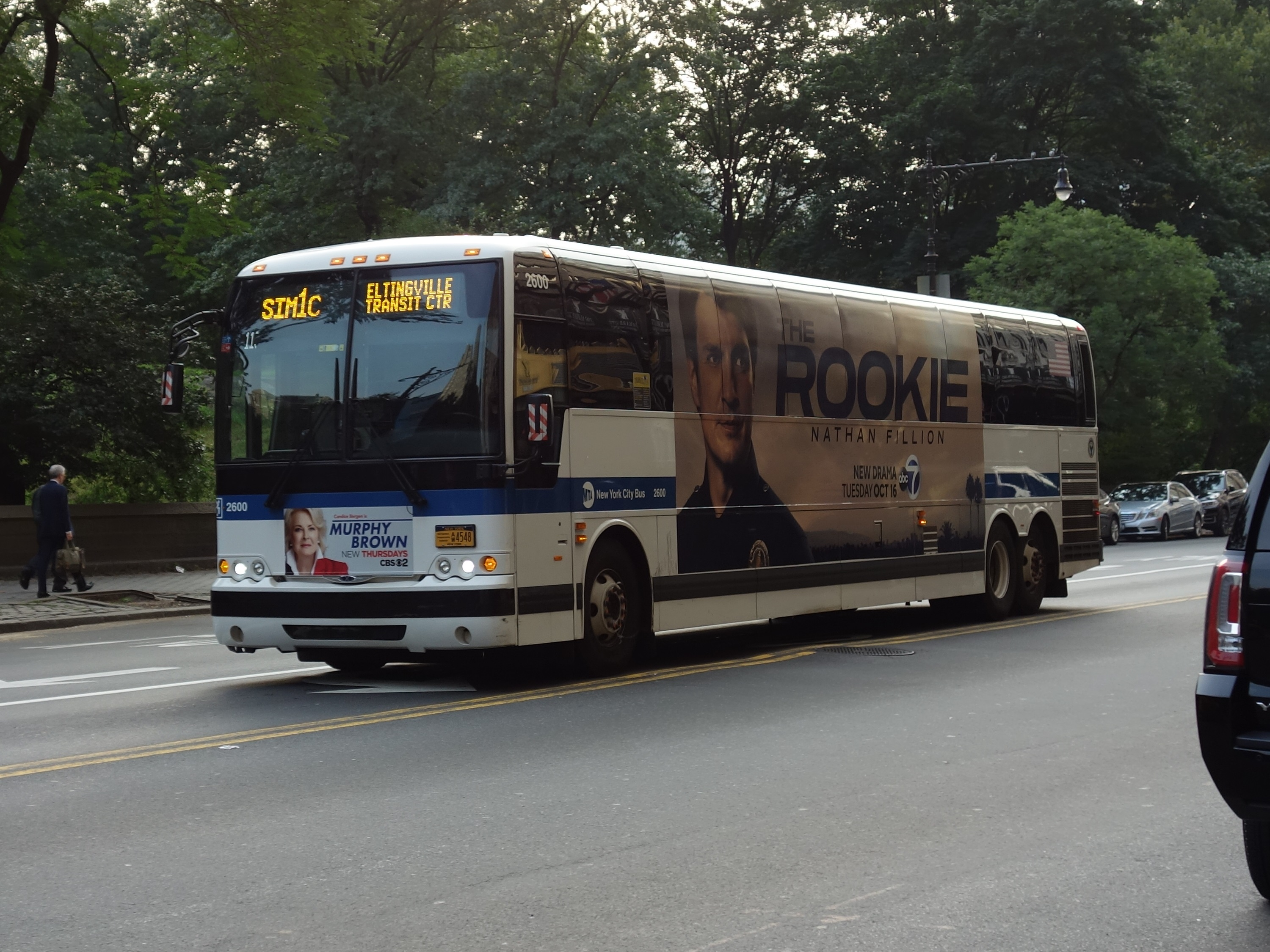
A 2015 Prevost X3-45 (2600) on the Eltingville-bound SIM1C at 59th Street/7th Avenue in Midtown Manhattan in August 2018.

The SIM1C follows the SIM1's route, then uses Sixth Avenue northbound to 23rd Street, before following the SIM10's route to 59th Street. Southbound, the SIM1C follows the SIM10 to 23rd Street, then uses Fifth Avenue and Broadway to the Battery Tunnel.

== History ==
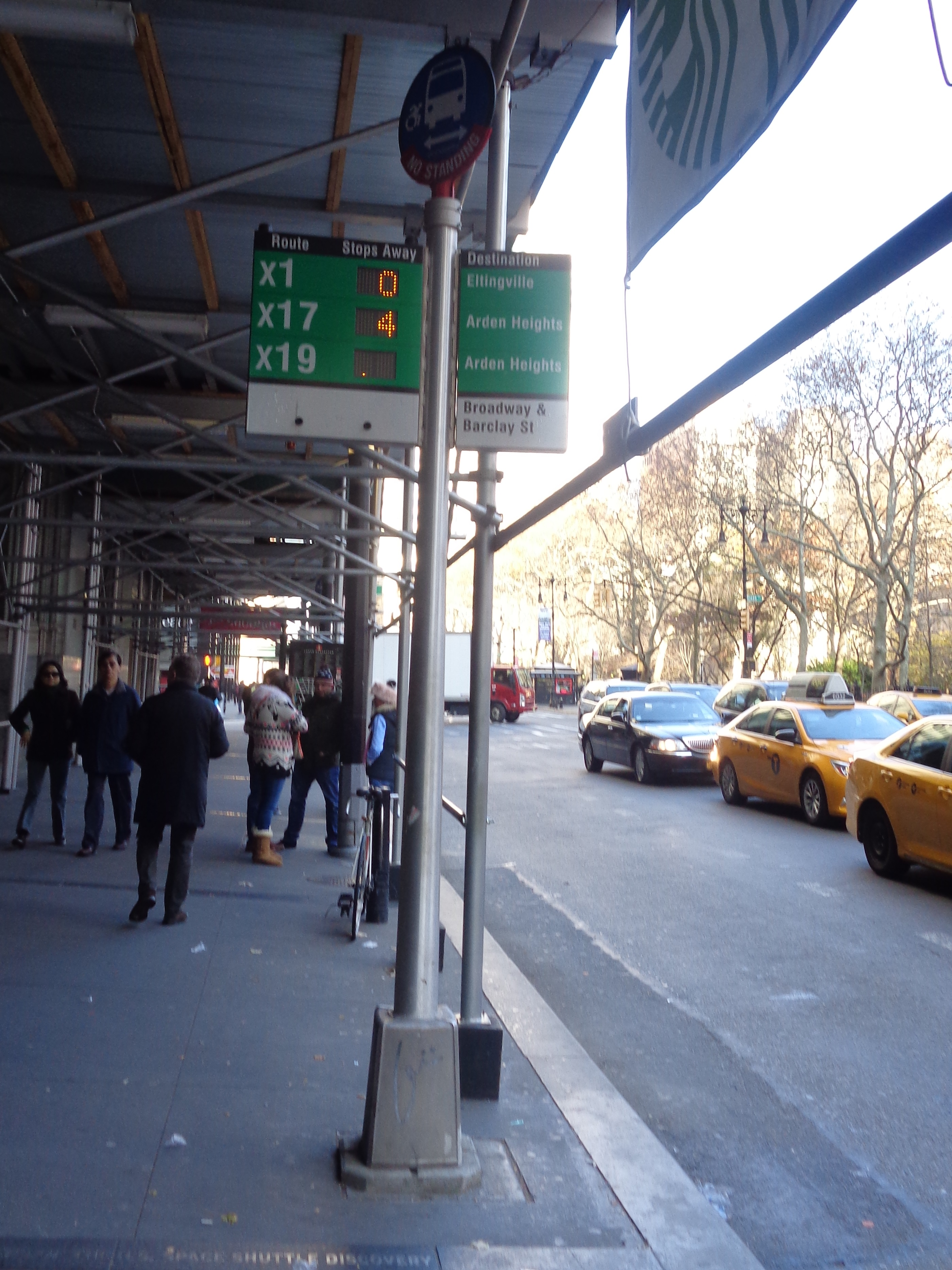
An X1 Eltingville bus stop with countdown clocks at Broadway/Barclay Street, among other routes, before SIM conversion

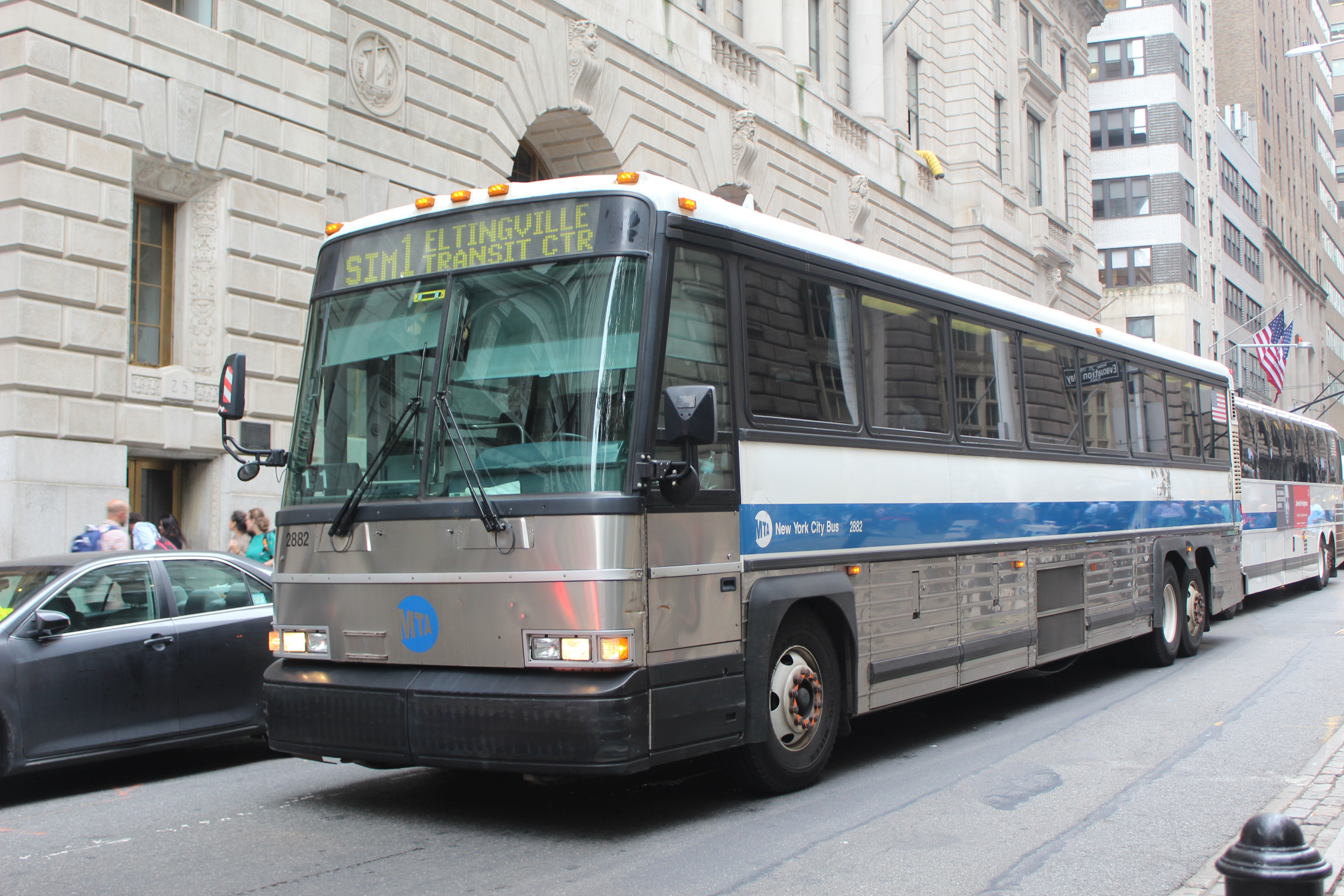
A 2002 Motor Coach D4500CL (2882) on the Eltingville-bound SIM1 on Broadway in Lower Manhattan, after SIM conversion

These routes replaced the X1, X2, X3, X4, X5, X7, X8, and X9 routes in the Staten Island Bus Redesign. The SIM1 was extended to Houston Street on January 13, 2019. The SIM10 has had multiple trips added, it operates from 2:00PM to 6:40PM leaving Manhattan, and from 4:10AM to 8:10AM leaving Staten Island.

The SIM1C is also notable for being the only express bus route in New York City with 24-hour service.
