= Dongal =

Dongal دنگل
- Village
- Location within Iran
- Coordinates: 37°37′46″N 57°18′16″E
- Country: Iran
- Province: North Khorasan
- County: Bojnord
- Bakhsh: Garmkhan
- Rural District: Garmkhan

Population (2006)
  - Total: 337
- Time zone: UTC+3:30 (IRST)
  - Summer (DST): UTC+4:30 (IRDT)

Dongal (Persian: دنگل, also Romanized as Dāngal and Dāngol; also known as Dongān, Dūngir, and Dūnjīr) is a village in Garmkhan Rural District, Garmkhan District, Bojnord County, North Khorasan Province, Iran. At the 2006 census, its population was 337, in 90 families.
