= Dunga (Catholic singer) =

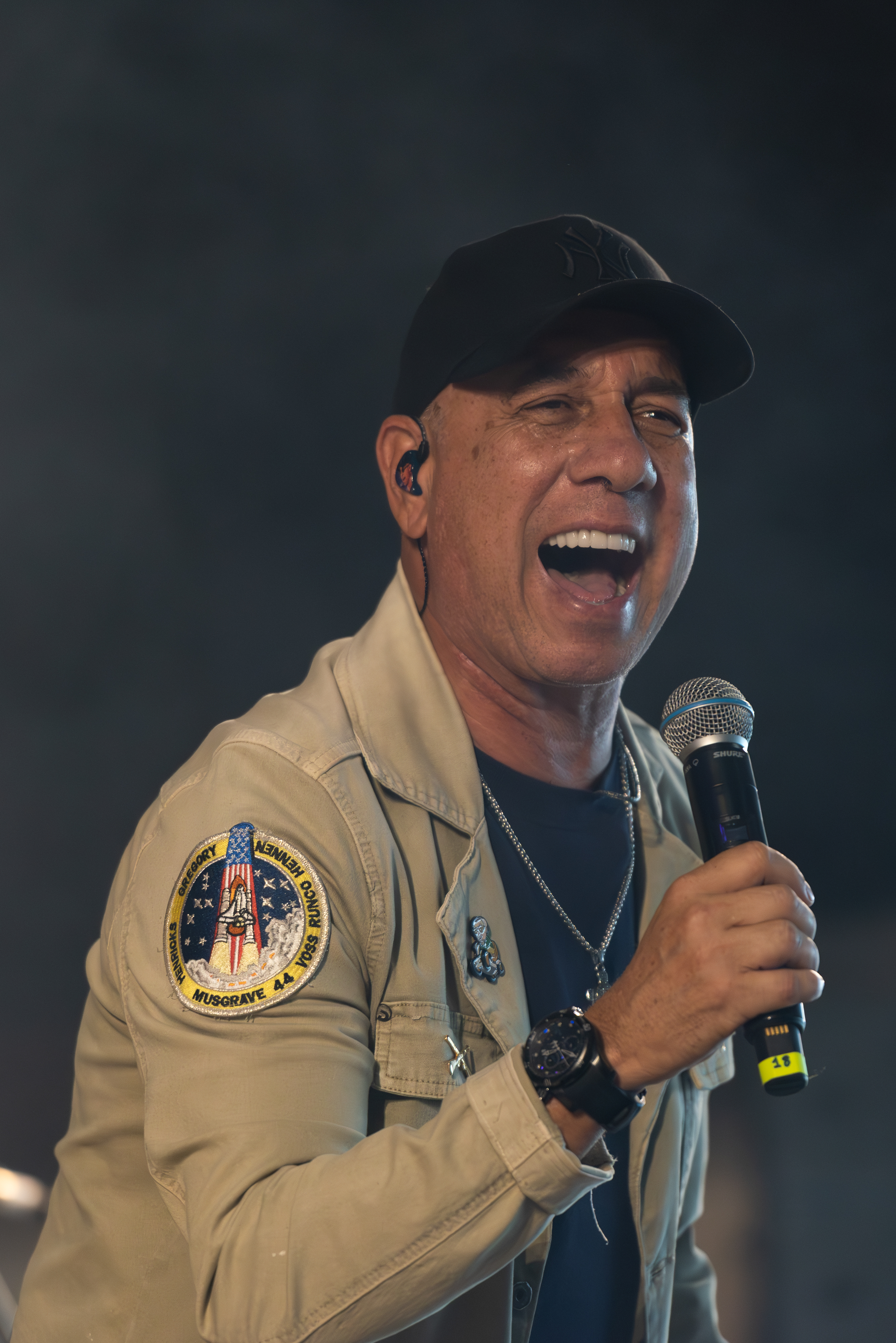

Background information
- Born: Francisco José dos Santos; 1 March 1964 (age 62); Pindamonhangaba, São Paulo, Brazil
- Genre: Contemporary Catholic liturgical music
- Occupations: Singer, writer
- Instrument: Voice
- Years active: 1995–present

Francisco José dos Santos (born 1 March 1964), popularly known as Dunga, is a Brazilian singer, songwriter, preacher, writer, radio broadcaster and Catholic television presenter who worked on TV Canção Nova.

== Biography ==
Dunga was born in Pindamonhangaba, in the Paraíba Valley, in the interior of São Paulo, on Sunday, 1 March 1964, and registered on 2 March. Son of Francisco dos Santos and Maria Benedita de Lima Santos, he lived his childhood at the Coruputuba farm. He has shown interest in music since he was a child. When he turned six, her older sister, Fia, gave her a Beatles record, a simple compact, and he immediately began to sing along with a cousin. One day, in the farm hen, he made a battery of paint cans, broomstick mics, wooden guitars with strings of thin wire, and the puleiro made a grandstand and also a flap.

In the 1980s, Dunga had many problems with drugs and drinks. But at the age of eighteen he returned to the Catholic Church and married. He grew professionally, becoming a professional mechanic. He was an animator of a prayer group, and at that time already married to Edinéia, he had his first son, Felipe. Today, the couple has two more daughters: Priscila and Ana Carolina.

Dunga received an invitation to live in Canção Nova in 1991, beginning his career as a missionary of the Canção Nova Community, where he gained a great deal of focus on dealing with youth, especially with the movement PHN (Por Hoje Não Vou Mais Pecar). According to the singer himself, the PHN arose from the experience acquired by him in the visits to prison, Casa Foundation, houses to support the HIV virus, in addition to his own life history. The idea grew stronger when Dunga heard a lecture in which Father Jonas Abib, founder of Canção Nova, spoke to the young people.

In 2018 Dunga and his wife asked to be turned off from Canção Nova.

== Career ==
=== Albums ===
Throughout these years of mission, Dunga has reaffirming himself in the Ministry of Music. Today, he had thirteen CDs recorded:

- Pense Bem (1995)
- Deus Existe (1995)
- Restauração (1998)
- Água Humilde (2001)
- Dunga 10 Anos (ao vivo) (2001)
- Foi Assim (2005)
- Dunga na Pista (Remix) (2006)
- Dunga 15 Anos (ao vivo) (2007)
- Transfiguração (2008)
- Fogo Abrasador (2013)
- PHN Ao Vivo (2014)
- A festa (2016)
- Acredite (2018)

=== DVDs ===
Dunga has recorded three DVDs so far:

- Dunga – Live – with unpublished images of major festivals, concerts, photo gallery, clips, interviews with subtitles and narration in English, Spanish and Portuguese.
- Dunga Electroacoustic (2010) – Recorded in High Definition (HD) with the best of the singer's 20 years of career and other unreleased songs. The recording of the DVD took place on July 17, in the São Paulo Auditorium – in the premises of Canção Nova headquarters, in Cachoeira Paulista (SP).
- Dunga – PHN Live – Recorded in July 2014, during PHN Camp.

=== Published books ===
He has six books written by Editora Canção Nova:

- Sementes de Uma Nova Geração
- Jovem, o Caminho se Faz Caminhando
- Sexualidade e a Cura da Nossa Afetividade
- Abra-se à Restauração
- Respostas para o Jovem PHN
- PHN – 12 Histórias de Amor
