= Dongan Hills, Staten Island =

Neighborhood in New York City

Dongan Hills
- Neighborhood of Staten Island
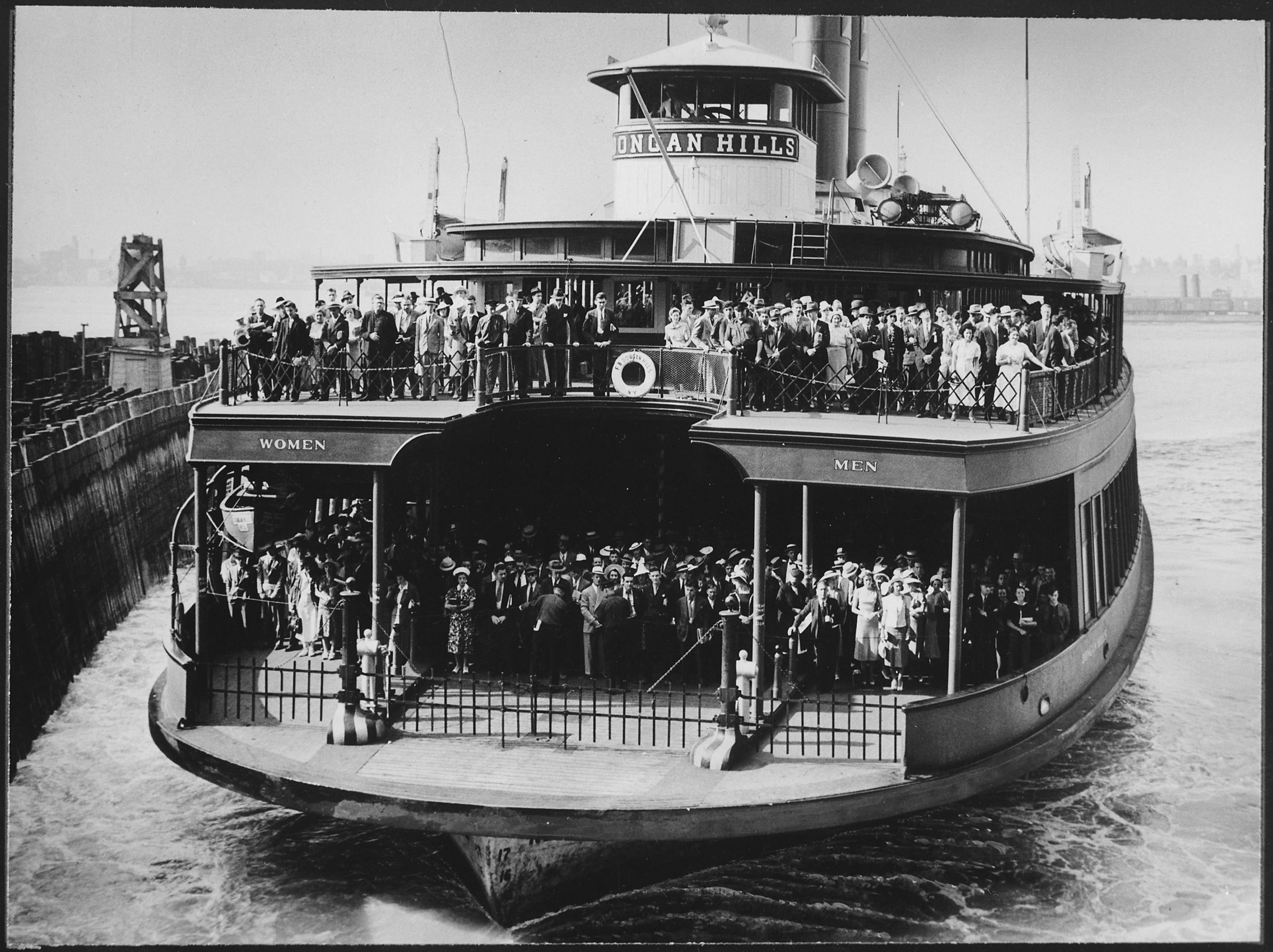
- Ferryboat Dongan Hills of the Staten Island Ferry, seen approaching a landing in 1945
- Interactive map of Dongan Hills
- Coordinates: 40.589°N 74.096°W
- Country: United States
- State: New York
- City: New York City
- Borough: Staten Island
- Community District: Staten Island 2

Area
  - Total: 1.409 sq mi (3.65 km^{2})

Population (2020)
  - Total: 36,259
  - Density: 25,730/sq mi (9,936/km^{2})

Economics
  - Median income: $73,378
- ZIP Codes: 10304, 10305
- Area code: 718, 347, 929, and 917

Dongan Hills is a neighborhood located within the New York City borough of Staten Island. It is on the island's East Shore. Dongan Hills is bounded by Laconia Avenue to the southeast, Jefferson Avenue on the southwest, Richmond Road on the northwest, and Old Town Road to the north. It is adjacent to New Dorp and Grant City to the southwest, Todt Hill to the northwest, Old Town/Concord to the northeast, and South Beach and Midland Beach to the southeast.

Dongan Hills is part of Staten Island Community District 2 and its ZIP Codes are 10304 and 10305. Dongan Hills is patrolled by the 122nd Precinct of the New York City Police Department.

== Etymology ==
The neighborhood was originally known by two separate names, the western half being called Hillside Park and the eastern half Linden Park. The name of Dongan Hills was originally Garretson's named after a family that lived in the area since the late 1600s. The name was changed to Dongan Hills to avoid confusion with Garrison-on-Hudson. The neighborhood was renamed for Thomas Dongan, the Irish-born governor of the Province of New York after the Kingdom of England acquired it from the Netherlands in 1682. The "hills" alluded to in the name are the eastern ridge of Todt Hill, and much of what is colloquially referred to as "Todt Hill" by most island residents is reckoned as belonging to Dongan Hills by more authoritative sources such as the Staten Island Advance. However, there is a section of Dongan Hills that contains large hills. This portion of the neighborhood is called, the Dongan Hills Colony. "The Colony" is located above Richmond Road and borders the neighborhood of Todt Hill.

== History ==
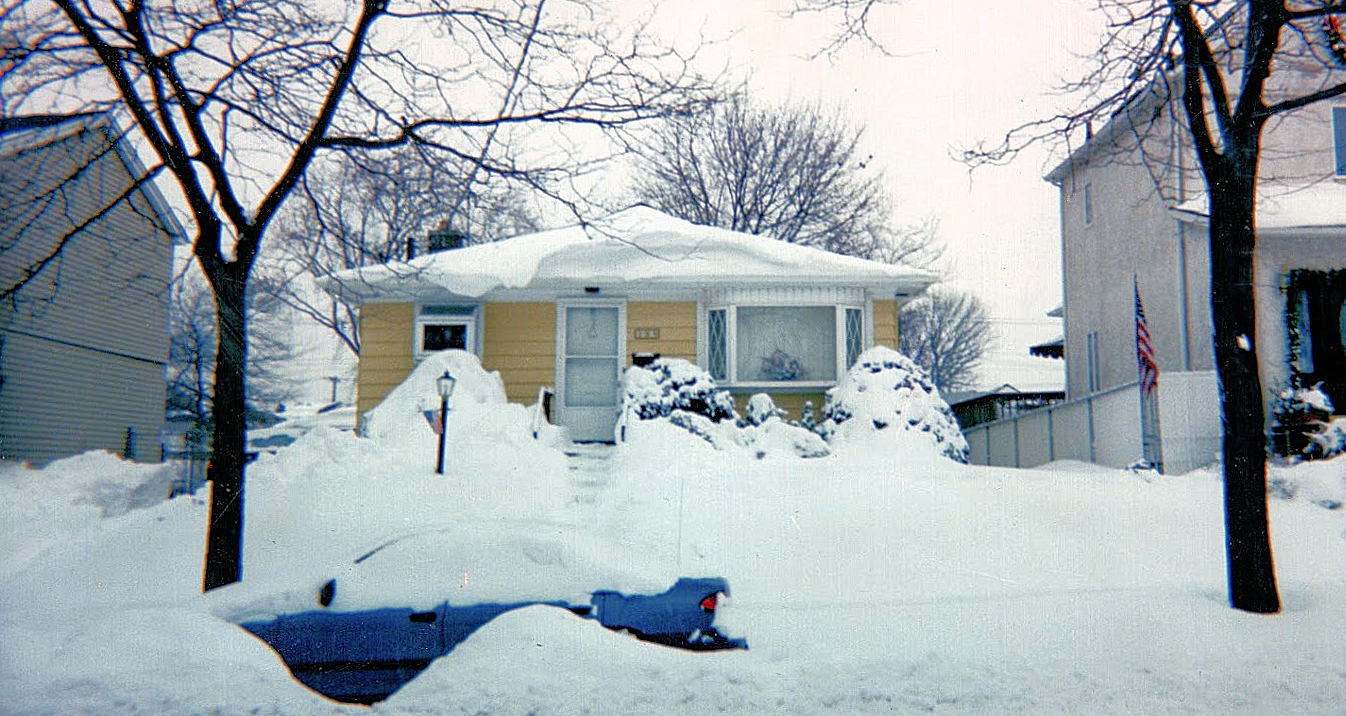
A typical one-family house (built in 1960) in Dongan Hills.

Dongan Hills was one of the first Staten Island neighborhoods to witness an upsurge in home construction after World War II, as many small, one-family homes were built there during the 1950s. The city also built a public housing project in the community. Known as the General Berry Houses, it is the southernmost public housing project on Staten Island. Population growth accelerated in the area when the Verrazzano–Narrows Bridge linking Staten Island with Brooklyn was opened in November 1964. Indeed, recent arrivals from Brooklyn have overwhelmed the descendants of the original residents, and now form a majority of the neighborhood's population.

Most of the residents are Italian-American, with a small, but significant amount of Irish-Americans.

The Billiou-Stillwell-Perine House was listed on the National Register of Historic Places in 1976.

== Demographics ==
For census purposes, the New York City Department of City Planning classifies Grasmere as part of a larger Neighborhood Tabulation Area called Grasmere-Arrochar-South Beach-Dongan Hills SI0201. This designated neighborhood had 36,259 inhabitants based on data from the 2020 United States Census. This was an increase of 1,834 persons (5.3%) from the 34,425 counted in 2010. The neighborhood had a population density of 19.9 inhabitants per acre (14,500/sq mi; 5,600/km^{2}).

The racial makeup of the neighborhood was 57.7% (20,914) White (Non-Hispanic), 5.0% (1,828) Black (Non-Hispanic), 17.9% (6,499) Asian, and 2.7% (979) from two or more races. Hispanic or Latino of any race were 16.7% (6,039) of the population.

According to the 2020 United States Census, this area has many cultural communities of over 1,000 inhabitants. This include residents who identify as Mexican, Puerto Rican, Albanian, German, Irish, Italian, Polish, Russian, African-American, and Chinese.

The largest age group was people 50–64 years old, which made up 22.4% of the residents. 70.0% of the households had at least one family present. Out of the 12,811 households, 46.4% had a married couple (18.2% with a child under 18), 4.4% had a cohabiting couple (1.7% with a child under 18), 19.1% had a single male (1.7% with a child under 18), and 30.1% had a single female (5.3% with a child under 18). 31.6% of households had children under 18. In this neighborhood, 42.8% of non-vacant housing units are renter-occupied.

The entirety of Community District 2, which comprises Dongan Hills and other Mid-Island neighborhoods, had 134,657 inhabitants as of NYC Health's 2018 Community Health Profile, with an average life expectancy of 81.2 years. This is the same as the median life expectancy of 81.2 for all New York City neighborhoods. Most inhabitants are youth and middle-aged adults: 20% are between the ages of between 0–17, 25% between 25 and 44, and 29% between 45 and 64. The ratio of college-aged and elderly residents was lower, at 8% and 18% respectively.

As of 2017, the median household income in Community District 2 was $81,487, though the median income in Dongan Hills individually was $73,378. In 2018, an estimated 14% of Dongan Hills and Mid-Island residents lived in poverty, compared to 17% in all of Staten Island and 20% in all of New York City. One in sixteen residents (6%) were unemployed, compared to 6% in Staten Island and 9% in New York City. Rent burden, or the percentage of residents who have difficulty paying their rent, is 52% in Dongan Hills and Mid-Island, compared to the boroughwide and citywide rates of 49% and 51% respectively. Based on this calculation, as of 2018, Dongan Hills and Mid-Island are considered high-income relative to the rest of the city and not gentrifying.

== Police and crime ==
Dongan Hills and Mid-Island are patrolled by the 122nd Precinct of the NYPD, located at 2320 Hylan Boulevard. The 122nd Precinct ranked 2nd safest out of 69 patrol areas for per-capita crime in 2010, behind only the 123rd Precinct on Staten Island's South Shore. As of 2018, with a non-fatal assault rate of 40 per 100,000 people, Dongan Hills and Mid-Island's rate of violent crimes per capita is less than that of the city as a whole. The incarceration rate of 253 per 100,000 people is lower than that of the city as a whole.

The 122nd Precinct has a substantially lower crime rate than in the 1990s, with crimes across all categories having decreased by 88.3% between 1990 and 2022. The precinct reported one murder, eight rapes, 63 robberies, 128 felony assaults, 91 burglaries, 373 grand larcenies, and 136 grand larcenies auto in 2022.

== Fire safety ==
Dongan Hills is served by the New York City Fire Department (FDNY)'s Engine Co. 159/Satellite 5, located at 1592 Richmond Road.

== Health ==
As of 2018, preterm births and births to teenage mothers are less common in Dongan Hills and Mid-Island than in other places citywide. In Dongan Hills and Mid-Island, there were 80 preterm births per 1,000 live births (compared to 87 per 1,000 citywide), and 6.8 births to teenage mothers per 1,000 live births (compared to 19.3 per 1,000 citywide). Dongan Hills and Mid-Island have a low population of residents who are uninsured. In 2018, this population of uninsured residents was estimated to be 4%, less than the citywide rate of 12%, though this was based on a small sample size.

The concentration of fine particulate matter, the deadliest type of air pollutant, in Dongan Hills and Mid-Island is 0.0069 milligrams per cubic metre (6.9×10^{−9} oz/ft^{3}), less than the city average. Fourteen percent of Dongan Hills and Mid-Island residents are smokers, which is the same as the city average of 14% of residents being smokers. In Dongan Hills and Mid-Island, 24% of residents are obese, 9% are diabetic, and 26% have high blood pressure—compared to the citywide averages of 24%, 11%, and 28% respectively. In addition, 19% of children are obese, compared to the citywide average of 20%.

Eighty-eight percent of residents eat some fruits and vegetables every day, which is about the same as the city's average of 87%. In 2018, 76% of residents described their health as "good", "very good", or "excellent", slightly less than the city's average of 78%. For every supermarket in Dongan Hills and Mid-Island, there are 7 bodegas.

The nearest major hospital is Staten Island University Hospital in South Beach.

== Post office and ZIP Codes ==
Dongan Hills is located within the ZIP Codes 10305 south of the Staten Island Railway line and 10304 north of the railway line. The United States Postal Service does not operate a post office in Dongan Hills, but the nearest post office is New Dorp Station at 2562 Hylan Boulevard.

== Education ==
Dongan Hills and Mid-Island generally have a similar rate of college-educated residents to the rest of the city as of 2018. While 40% of residents age 25 and older have a college education or higher, 11% have less than a high school education and 49% are high school graduates or have some college education. By contrast, 39% of Staten Island residents and 43% of city residents have a college education or higher. The percentage of Dongan Hills and Mid-Island students excelling in math rose from 49% in 2000 to 65% in 2011, though reading achievement declined from 55% to 52% during the same time period.

Dongan Hills and Mid-Island's rate of elementary school student absenteeism is lower than the rest of New York City. In Dongan Hills and Mid-Island, 15% of elementary school students missed twenty or more days per school year, less than the citywide average of 20%. Additionally, 87% of high school students in Dongan Hills and Mid-Island graduate on time, more than the citywide average of 75%.

=== Schools ===
The New York City Department of Education operates the following public schools near Dongan Hills:

- PS 11 Thomas Dongan School (grades PK-5)
- PS 46 Albert V Maniscalco (grades PK-5)

=== Library ===
The New York Public Library (NYPL)'s Dongan Hills branch is located at 1617 Richmond Road, just west of Seaview Avenue. The branch started operating out of a location on Richmond Road in 1957 and moved to its current one-story location in 1975. The building was refurbished in 2008.

== Transportation ==
Dongan Hills is served by the Staten Island Railway station of the same name. Dongan Hills is also served by the S78 and S79 SBS local buses on Hylan Boulevard and the S74, S84, S76 and S86 local buses on Richmond Road. Express bus service is provided by the SIM1, SIM7 and SIM10 on Hylan Boulevard and the SIM15 on Richmond Road.

== Notable residents ==
- Charles W. Berry (1871–1941), New York City Comptroller
- Robert Crooks Stanley (1876–1951), former chairman and president of International Nickel Company, known for discovering the alloy Monel
