= Steven Matteo =

American politician

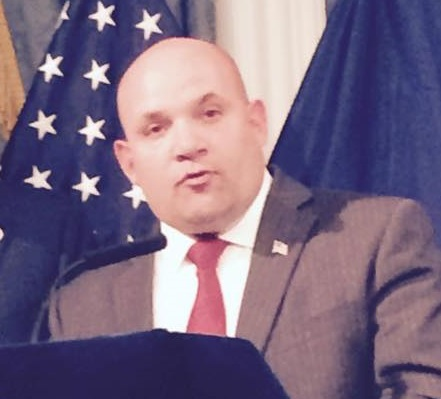

Minority Leader of the New York City Council
- In office July 1, 2015 – November 17, 2021
- Whip: Joe Borelli
- Preceded by: Vincent M. Ignizio
- Succeeded by: Joe Borelli

Member of the New York City Council from the 50th district
- In office January 1, 2014 – November 26, 2021
- Preceded by: James Oddo
- Succeeded by: David Carr

Personal details
- Born: February 18, 1977 (age 49) Staten Island, New York, U.S.
- Party: Republican
- Spouse: Anne Matteo
- Children: 4
- Education: St. Francis College (BA); Touro College (JD)

Steven Matteo (born February 18, 1977) is an American politician who served as Council member for the 50th district of the New York City Council. He is a Republican.

His district is located completely on Staten Island and encompasses the neighborhoods of Arrochar, Bloomfield, Bulls Head, Castleton Corners, Chelsea, Concord, Dongan Hills, Egbertville, Emerson Hill, Fort Wadsworth, Graniteville, Grant City, Grasmere, Heartland Village, Isle of Meadows, Lighthouse Hill, Manor Heights, Meiers Corners, Midland Beach, New Dorp, New Springville, Oakwood, Ocean Breeze, Old Town, Prall's Island, Richmondtown, Rosebank, Shore Acres, South Beach, Todt Hill, Travis, Westerleigh, and Willowbrook.

== Life and career ==
Born on Staten Island as the youngest of three sons, Steven Matteo earned a B.A. from St. Francis College and a J.D. from Touro Law School. He started in politics by working as Deputy Director of Constituent Services to then-Councilman James Oddo in 2004 and then as Chief of Staff in 2006.

Matteo was originally going to be a candidate for the 50th Council district in 2009 but withdrew after the change in the term limits law permitted Oddo to seek a third full term.

== New York City Council ==
Matteo contested a bitter Republican primary for the seat on September 10, 2013, against attorney Lisa Giovinazzo. The party feud led to fissures between Minority Leader James Oddo and Congressman Michael Grimm; the latter was supporting Giovinazzo. The disagreement over the party's nomination in this race led to the resignation of GOP County Chairman and Grimm ally, Robert Scamardella. Ultimately, Matteo won with 55% of the vote.

In the general election, John Mancuso was the nominee of the Democratic Party. Matteo won the general with nearly 64% of the vote. In 2017, he won re-election with almost 80% of the vote.

Steven Matteo took office in 2014 and has had a focus on small business initiatives including the creation of merchant groups in his district. Additionally, he has made traffic flow and driver safety a priority through intersection improvement requests. In 2018 Matteo was appointed to serve at the chair of the City Council's Committee on Standards and Ethics.

Due to the news of an impending resignation from the Council by Vincent Ignizio, there was speculation as to whether Matteo or Queens Republican Eric Ulrich would succeed to the position of Minority Leader. Matteo was ultimately elected with votes from himself and Ignizio before the latter's departure from the Council.

To date, Matteo has authored 22 pieces of legislation to pass the New York City Council. Among his first was a bill that improved building construction standards by requiring mold resistant materials in moisture prone locations of new buildings. This was followed later in 2014 with a local law creating the West Shore Industrial Business Improvement District. In 2016, Matteo authored and passed legislation that would require the City of New York to provide free automated external defibrillators for any youth baseball league that has games and practices on City-owned fields.

== Electoral history ==
=== 2021 ===
2021 Staten Island borough president Republican primary
Party	Candidate	Maximum round	Maximum votes	Share in maximum round	Maximum votes First round votes Transfer votes
Republican	Vito Fossella	3	9,461	51.2%	
Republican	Steven Matteo	3	9,018	48.8%	
Republican	Leticia Remauro	2	2,487	12.7%	
Republican	Jhong U. Kim	2	556	2.8%	
Write-In		1	151	0.8%	

=== 2017 ===
2017 New York City Council election, District 50
Party	Candidate	Votes	%
Republican	Steven Matteo	21,735	66.2
Conservative	Steven Matteo	3,447	10.5
Independence	Steven Matteo	770	2.3
Reform	Steven Matteo	180	0.5
Total	Steven Matteo (incumbent)	26,132	79.6
Democratic	Richard A. Florentino	6,608	20.1
Write-in		70	0.2
Total votes		32,810	100.0
Republican hold			

=== 2015 ===
2015 New York City Council minority leader election * denotes incumbent
Party	Candidate	Votes	%
Republican	Steven Matteo (District 50)	2 (Note: The two votes for Matteo were cast by Vincent Ignizio and Matteo himself.)	66.7
—	Absent	1 (Note: The one absence was from Eric Ulrich.)	33.3
Total votes		2	100.0
Votes necessary		2	>50.0

=== 2013 ===
2013 New York City Council Republican primary, District 50
Party	Candidate	Votes	%
Republican	Steven Matteo	3,083	55.2
Republican	Lisa Giovinazzo	2,504	44.8
Write-in		3	0.1
Total votes		5,590	100.0

2013 New York City Council election, District 50
Party	Candidate	Votes	%
Republican	Steven Matteo	13,522	52.7
Conservative	Steven Matteo	2,216	8.6
Independence	Steven Matteo	557	2.2
Total	Steven Matteo	16,295	63.5
Democratic	John M. Mancuso	8,611	33.6
Working Families	John M. Mancuso	723	2.8
Total	John M. Mancuso	9,334	36.4
Write-in		27	0.1
Total votes		25,656	100.0
Republican hold			

== Notes ==
Political offices
Preceded by James Oddo	Member of the New York City Council from the 50th district 2014–2022	Succeeded by David Carr
Preceded by Vincent Ignizio	Minority Leader of the New York City Council; 2015–2022	Succeeded by Joe Borelli
