= Community boards of Staten Island =

Map of community districts in the City of New York

Community boards of Staten Island are New York City community boards in the borough of Staten Island, which are the appointed advisory groups of the community districts that advise on land use and zoning, participate in the city budget process, and address service delivery in their district.

Community boards are each composed of up to 50 volunteer members appointed by the local borough president, half from nominations by City Council members representing the community district (i.e., whose council districts cover part of the community district). Additionally, all City Council members representing the community district are non-voting, ex officio board members.

== History ==
The 1963 revision of the New York City Charter extended the Borough of Manhattan's "Community Planning Councils" (est. 1951) to the outer boroughs as "Community Planning Boards", which are now known as "Community Boards".

The 1975 revision of the New York City Charter set the number of Community Districts/Boards to 59, established the position of the district manager for the community districts, and created the Uniform Land Use Review Procedure (ULURP) which gave the community boards the authority to review land use proposals such as zoning actions, and special permits.

== Community Districts ==
Borough	Borough President (B.P.)	Number of Districts	Max. number of B.P. appointees	Max. number of all appointees
Staten Island	Vito Fossella	3	75	150

Community Districts in Staten Island
Community District (CD)	Region	Area	Pop. Census; 2010	Pop./ sq mi	Neighborhoods & areas	ZIP Codes	Area Codes
Staten Island CD 1 website	North Shore	13.5 sq mi (35 km^{2})	175,756	13,019	Arlington, northern Castleton Corners, Clifton Concord, Elm Park, Fort Wadsworth, northern Graniteville, Grymes Hill, Livingston, Mariners' Harbor, northern Meiers Corners, New Brighton, Port Ivory, Port Richmond, Randall Manor, Rosebank, St. George, Shore Acres, Silver Lake, Stapleton, Sunnyside, Tompkinsville, West Brighton, Westerleigh, and northern Willowbrook.	10301, 10302, 10303, 10304, 10305, 10310, and 10314	718, 347, and 929, and 917
Staten Island CD 2 website	Mid-Island	21.3 sq mi (55 km^{2})	132,003	6,197	Arrochar, Staten Island, Bloomfield, Bulls Head, Chelsea, southern Castleton Corners, Dongan Hills, Egbertville, Emerson Hill, southern Graniteville, Grant City, Grasmere, Heartland Village, Midland Beach, New Dorp, New Springville, Oakwood, Ocean Breeze, Old Town, South Beach, Todt Hill, Travis, and southern Willowbrook	10301, 10304, 10305, 10306, and 10314	718, 347, and 929, and 917
Staten Island CD 3 website	South Shore	21.5 sq mi (56 km^{2})	160,209	7,452	Annadale, Arden Heights, Bay Terrace, Charleston, Eltingville, Great Kills, Greenridge, Huguenot, Pleasant Plains, Prince's Bay, Richmond Valley, Rossville, Tottenville and Woodrow	10306, 10307, 10308, 10309, 10312	718, 332, 347, 929, and 917

Administration
Community District	District Manager	Chairperson	NYPD Precinct	Notes
Staten Island Community District 1	Joan Cusack	Nicholas Siclari	120th	Leticia Remauro is a former chairperson
Staten Island Community District 2	Debra Derrico	Fred R. Guinta	122nd	
Staten Island Community District 3	Stacey Wertheim	Diane Peruggia	123rd	

Race & Hispanic Origin
Community District	Hispanic & Latino-Americans	African-American	White	Asian	Others
Staten Island Community District 1	29.7%	21.3%	37.7%	8.5%	2.8%
Staten Island Community District 2	13.9%	4.1%	66.1%	13.8%	2.1%
Staten Island Community District 3	82.9%	1.1%	4.5%	1.3%	10.2%

== Staten Island Borough Board ==
The Staten Island Borough Board is composed of the borough president, New York City Council members whose districts are part of the borough, and the chairperson of each community board in the Staten Island.

The current borough board (as of June 2020) is composed of the 7 members listed in the table below:

The Staten Island Borough Board
Area	Title	Member name	Notes
Staten Island Community District 1	Chairperson	Nicholas Siclari	
Staten Island Community District 2	Chairperson	Fred R. Guinta	
Staten Island Community District 3	Chairperson	Vacant	
City Council District 49	Council member	Kamillah Hanks	Council district roughly corresponds to the North Shore
City Council District 50	Council member	David Carr	Council district roughly corresponds to Mid-Island
City Council District 51	Council member	Vacant	Council district roughly corresponds to South Shore
Borough of Staten Island	Borough President	Vito Fossella	

== Other areas ==
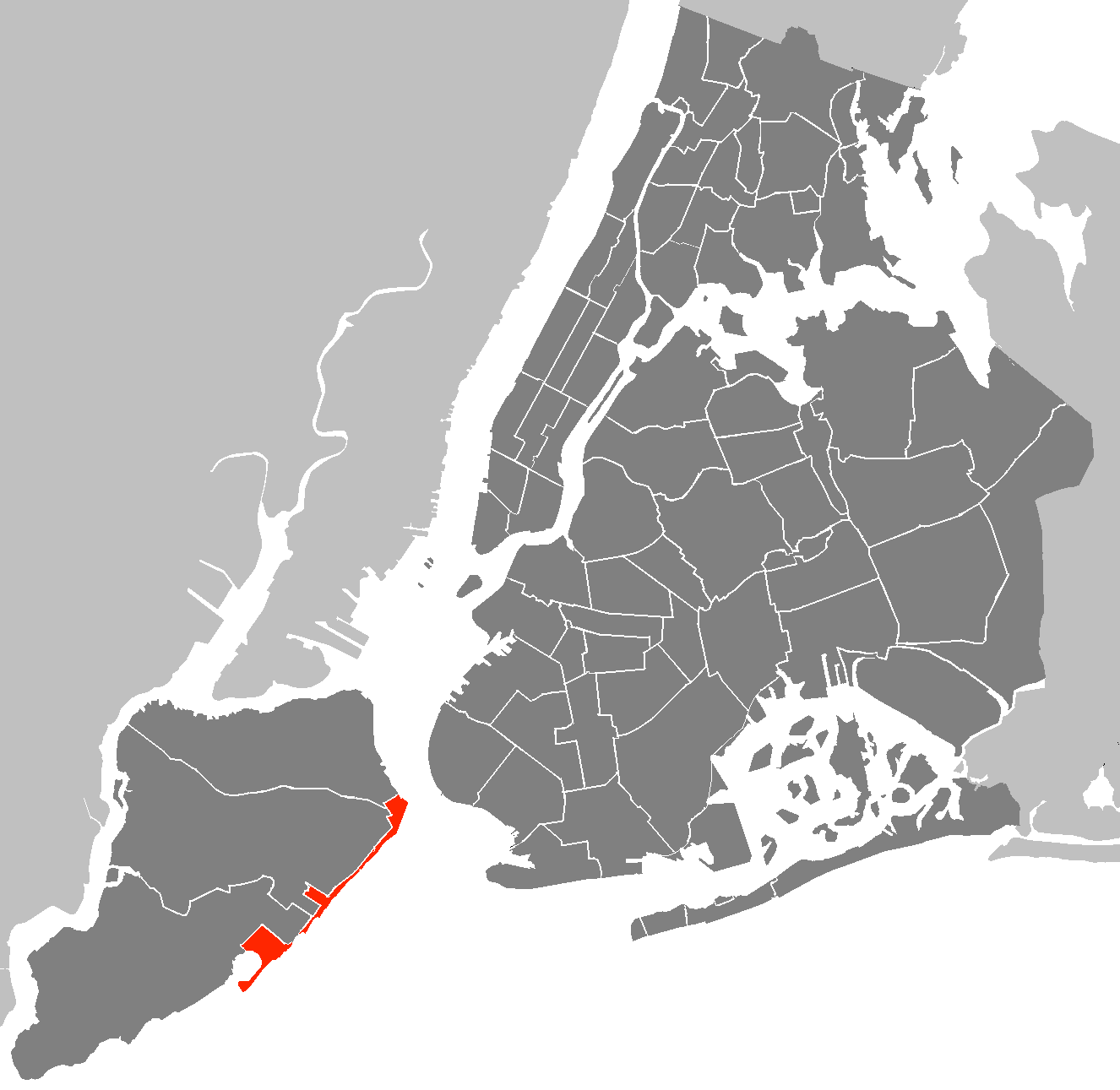
Staten Island Community District 95 / Gateway National Recreation Area

Within the borough of Staten Island there is one Joint Interest Area (JIA), which is outside of the jurisdiction of individual community districts, and has its own district number. The JIA in Richmond county is:

- District 95 - Staten Island Gateway National Recreation Area, 2010 Census population:762

== See also ==
- Government of New York City
- List of Staten Island neighborhoods
- New York City Council
- Borough president
- Borough boards of New York City
