= James Oddo =

Republican politician from Staten Island

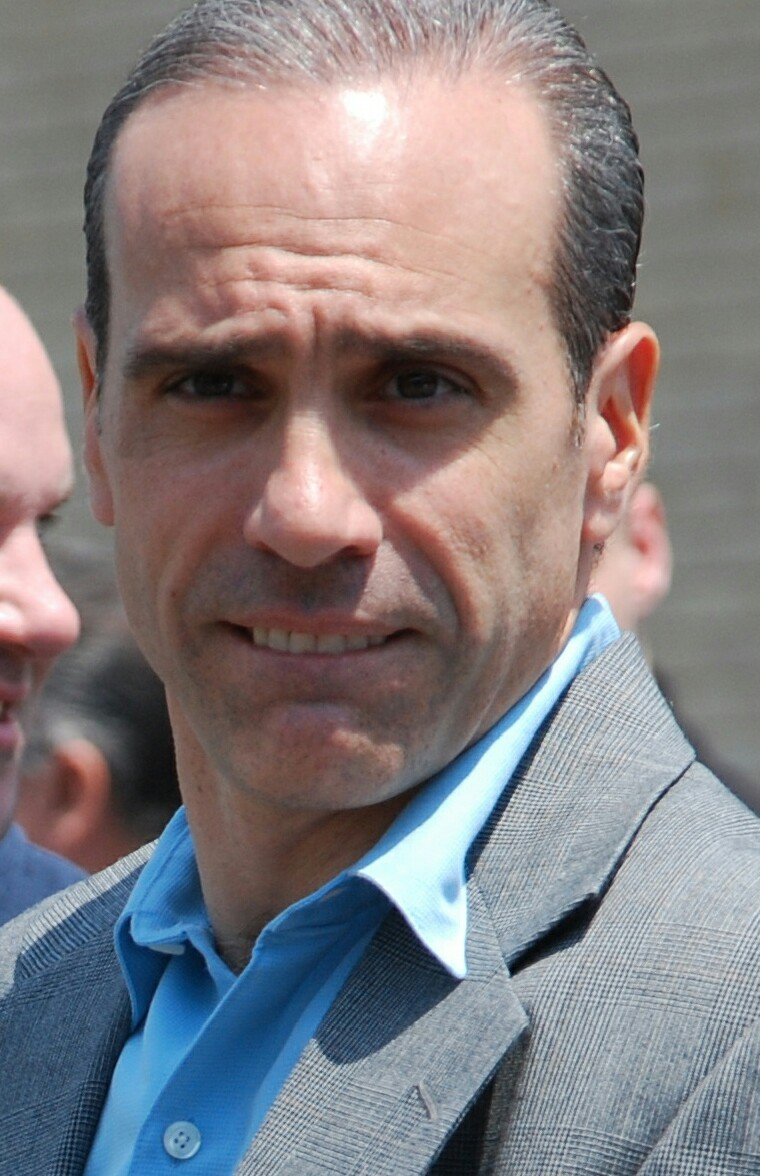
- Oddo in 2009

Commissioner of the New York City Department of Buildings
- In office April 27, 2023 – December 31, 2025
- Mayor: Eric Adams
- Preceded by: Eric Ulrich
- Succeeded by: Ahmed Tigani

15th Borough President of Staten Island
- In office January 1, 2014 – December 31, 2021
- Preceded by: James Molinaro
- Succeeded by: Vito Fossella

Minority Leader of the New York City Council
- In office January 1, 2002 – December 31, 2013
- Preceded by: Thomas Ognibene
- Succeeded by: Vincent Ignizio

Member of the New York City Council from the 50th district
- In office February 1, 1999 – December 31, 2013
- Preceded by: John Fusco
- Succeeded by: Steven Matteo

Personal details
- Born: James Steven Oddo; January 12, 1966 (age 60) New York City, New York, U.S.
- Party: Republican
- Spouse: Kim Petersen (m. 2014)
- Education: Fordham University (BA); New York Law School (JD)
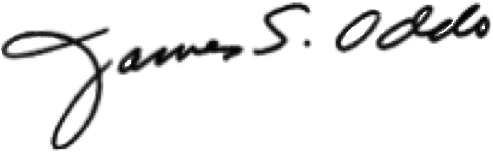
- Signature
- Website: Official website

James Steven Oddo (born January 12, 1966) is an American attorney and politician who served as the Borough President of Staten Island from 2014 to 2021. Oddo had previously served as a member of the New York City Council, representing the 50th district from 1999 to 2013. He served as the Commissioner for the New York City Department of Buildings under Mayor Eric Adams.

== Early life and education ==
Oddo was born on Staten Island, the youngest of four sons to an Italian-American family of city employees. He earned a Bachelor of Arts from Fordham University, and a Juris Doctor from New York Law School.

== Career ==
He started in politics by working as chief of staff to then-councilman John Fusco for seven years and as Legal Counsel to the former Council Minority Leader Thomas Ognibene.

Oddo's career as a politician began in February 1999 when he won a special election to fill the seat vacated by John Fusco. After the resignation of Tom Ognibene, he was elected Minority Leader of the City Council with the consent of the three other Republicans on the Council in 2002.

His district, the 50th, is located mainly on Staten Island and encompasses the neighborhoods of Arrochar, Bulls Head, Castleton Corners, Concord, Dongan Hills, Emerson Hill, Fort Wadsworth, Grant City, Graniteville, Grasmere, Heartland Village, Isle of Meadows, Meiers Corners, Midland Beach, New Dorp, New Springville, Oakwood, Ocean Breeze, Old Town, Prall's Island, Richmondtown, South Beach, Todt Hill, Travis, Westerleigh, and Willowbrook; but also parts of Bensonhurst, Dyker Heights and Bath Beach in Brooklyn.

On October 20, 2010, he announced he would run for the office of Staten Island Borough President in 2013. On November 5, 2013, he was elected to office with 48,168 votes (69%). He outran Democratic candidate Lou Liedy, Green Party candidate Henry Bardel, and Libertarian Party candidate Silas Johnson. His percentage of 69% was the highest ever for a non-incumbent winner of the office, beating the record set by Republican Robert Connor in 1965. James Oddo was re elected Borough President on November 7, 2017, with 75.56% of the vote.

In 2022, Oddo was named Chief of Staff to the New York City Deputy Mayor for Operations in the administration of Mayor Eric Adams.

=== Staten Island Bus Study ===
Borough President Oddo championed the Staten Island Bus Study which has recommended major service changes to Staten Island express buses. As a result of the study, express bus service to Staten Island was to be completely reorganized in August 2018. As part of the redesign, all of the existing bus routes would be discontinued and replaced with 21 new routes with a "SIM" prefix.

=== Norwegian comedy show incident ===
Councilman Oddo received widespread, negative attention when a video of the councilman appeared on YouTube around October 5, 2007. In the video clip, Oddo is shown being interviewed by a film crew from the Norwegian comedy show Rikets røst (meaning "Voice of the Nation"), a show similar to The Colbert Report. The comedians had gained entry to councilman Oddo's office by posing as TV journalists who wanted to get the view of a Republican on the upcoming U.S. presidential election.

Instead, the interviewer, Pia Haraldsen, played the role of an uninformed foreigner. She asked how Barack Obama could run for president, "as he is not a U.S. citizen" (when informed by Oddo that Obama is indeed an American, she wondered about that, given that she had read somewhere that he was "African-American") and asked if Senator Clinton could be president "after that embarrassing incident with the cigar?" On the aired clip, Haraldsen cannot refrain from smiling as Oddo starts swearing at and threatening the film crew. One of the film crew's cameras continues recording the incident, as Oddo, in a profanity-laced tirade, furiously tells them to get "the fuck" out of his office and threatens to physically harm the film crew. Oddo later apologized, stating the tirade was "inappropriate" but that the sentiment beneath it was entirely appropriate, despite threatening physical harm to the film crew.

The incident was widely viewed as an embarrassing and inappropriate reaction by Oddo.

=== Support of Congressman Fossella ===
In 2008, Oddo supported Congressman Vito Fossella, stating that he "knows what [Fossella's] core is about" and "He is my friend ... and I stand with him during the good times and I stand with him during the difficult times. What he needs to do is what he did today: Say, 'I'm ready to be held accountable and apologize and I have to heal myself, heal my relationship with my friends and family, and heal my relationship with my community.'" Fossella had been arrested for driving under the influence, was living with one woman while being married to another woman, and had fathered a child with the other woman.

=== 2018 Surrogate Court election ===
Oddo was widely believed to be running for surrogate court judge in 2018 despite running for election as Borough President in 2017. When asked about a potential surrogate court judge candidacy, Oddo stated that he honestly did not know if he would serve a full second term; this statement led critics and his main opponent in the 2017 Borough President election, Tom Shcherbenko, to argue that he should not run for Borough President if he already had one foot out the door. Oddo was re-elected Borough President in 2017. Oddo ultimately chose not to run for Surrogate Court Judge.

=== Views towards Muslims ===
In 2010, when developers planned to build a Muslim community center and mosque in Lower Manhattan, Oddo said he understood the outrage of families opposed to building a Muslim place of worship within a mile of the World Trade Center.

Later that year, when a Catholic church planned to sell a convent to a group intending to use the building for a mosque, Oddo said that he would oppose the plan until the "responsible leadership of the Muslim community wholeheartedly, full-throatedly condemns the extremists of their religion."

In 2005, Oddo said that police officers conducting random security searches on the New York subway system was not enough. Instead, he wanted police officers to prioritize the searching of young Muslim men.

== Electoral history ==
=== 2017 ===
2017 Staten Island borough president election
Party	Candidate	Votes	%
Republican	James Oddo	60,765	62.7
Conservative	James Oddo	9,124	9.4
Independence	James Oddo	1,979	2.0
Reform	James Oddo	603	0.6
Total	James Oddo (incumbent)	72,471	74.8
Democratic	Thomas E. Shcherbenko	21,980	22.7
Working Families	Thomas E. Shcherbenko	1,487	1.5
Total	Thomas E. Shcherbenko	23,467	24.2
Green	Henry J. Bardel	820	0.8
Write-in		131	0.1
Total votes		96,889	100.0
Republican hold			

=== 2013 ===
2013 Staten Island borough president election
Party	Candidate	Votes	%
Republican	James Oddo	42,305	57.5
Conservative	James Oddo	6,478	8.8
Independence	James Oddo	1,960	2.7
Total	James Oddo	50,743	69.0
Democratic	Louis L. Liedy	20,609	28.0
Working Families	Louis L. Liedy	1,375	1.9
Total	Louis L. Liedy	21,984	29.9
Green	Henry J. Bardel	495	0.7
Libertarian	Silas Johnson	356	0.5
Write-in		63	0.1
Total votes		73,641	100.0
Republican gain from Conservative			

=== 2009 ===
2009 New York City Council election, District 50
Party	Candidate	Votes	%
Republican	James Oddo	14,844	59.7
Conservative	James Oddo	1,692	6.8
Independence	James Oddo	1,562	6.3
Working Families	James Oddo	577	2.3
Total	James Oddo (incumbent)	18,675	75.2
Democratic	James M. Pocchia	6,166	24.8
Write-in		3	0.0
Total votes		24,844	100.0
Republican hold			

=== 2005 ===
2005 New York City Council election, District 50
Party	Candidate	Votes	%
Republican	James Oddo	18,109	70.0
Conservative	James Oddo	2,060	8.0
Total	James Oddo (incumbent)	20,169	78.0
Democratic	David Ceder	5,326	20.6
Independence	David Ceder	375	1.4
Total	David Ceder	5,701	22.0
Total votes		25,870	100.0
Republican hold			

=== 2003 ===
2003 New York City Council election, District 50
Party	Candidate	Votes	%
Republican	James Oddo	8,968	65.6
Conservative	James Oddo	1,605	11.7
Total	James Oddo (incumbent)	10,573	77.4
Democratic	Frank T. Fontaino	2,904	21.3
Independence	Frank T. Fontaino	188	1.4
Total	Frank T. Fontaino	3,092	22.6
Total votes		13,665	100.0
Republican hold			

=== 2001 ===
2001 New York City Council election, District 50
Party	Candidate	Votes	%
Republican	James Oddo	14,810	61.6
Conservative	James Oddo	1,161	4.8
Right to Life	James Oddo	502	2.1
Total	James Oddo (incumbent)	16,473	68.5
Democratic	Libby N. Hikind	6,560	27.3
Working Families	Libby N. Hikind	378	1.6
Independence	Libby N. Hikind	364	1.5
Liberal	Libby N. Hikind	178	0.7
Total	Libby N. Hikind	7,480	31.1
Green	Carl Mahler	101	0.4
Total votes		24,054	100.0
Republican hold			

=== 1999 ===
1999 New York City's 50th City Council District special election
Party	Candidate	Votes	%
Experience First	James Oddo	4,890	52.6
Unknown ballot line	John N. Sollazzo	3,734	40.2
Unknown ballot line	Libby N. Hikind	675	7.3
Total votes		9,299	100.0
Republican hold			

1999 New York City Council election, District 50
Party	Candidate	Votes	%
Republican	James Oddo	5,247	42.7
Conservative	James Oddo	730	5.9
Independence	James Oddo	418	3.4
Right to Life	James Oddo	398	3.2
Total	James Oddo (incumbent)	6,793	55.2
Democratic	John N. Sollazzo	4,916	40.0
Working Families	John N. Sollazzo	403	3.3
Total	John N. Sollazzo	5,319	43.2
Liberal	Marylou Ocallaghan	190	1.5
Total votes		12,302	100.0
Republican hold			

Political offices
Preceded by John Fusco	Member of the New York City Council from the 50th district 1999–2013	Succeeded by Steven Matteo
Preceded by Thomas Ognibene	Minority Leader of the New York City Council; 2002–2013	Succeeded by Vincent Ignizio
Preceded by James Molinaro	Borough President of Staten Island; 2014–2022	Succeeded by Vito Fossella
