= New York City's 50th City Council district =

- Boundaries following the 2020 census

Government
  - Councilmember: . David Carr. R–Grasmere

Population (2020)
  - Total: 165,074

Demographics
  - White: 64.3%
  - Hispanic: 14.1%
  - Asian: 15.9%
  - Black: 3%
  - Other: 2.7%

Registration
  - Democratic: 37.1%
  - Republican: 33.8%
  - No party preference: 23.7%
- Registered voters (2021) 115,817

New York City's 50th City Council district is one of 51 districts in the New York City Council. It has been represented by Republican David Carr since the end of 2021. Carr was the chief of staff to former Councilman Steven Matteo. Matteo was term-limited in 2021 and ran unsuccessfully for Staten Island Borough President.

== Geography ==
=== 2020s ===
Following redistricting in 2023, District 50 is a two-borough district, covering a large swath of Mid-Island Staten Island, including the neighborhoods of New Dorp, Midland Beach, Dongan Hills, South Beach, Arrochar, Bloomfield, Bulls Head, Castleton Corners, Chelsea, Egbertville, Emerson Hill, Grant City, Grasmere, Lighthouse Hill, Manor Heights, Meiers Corners, Oakwood, Old Town, Richmondtown, Shore Acres, Todt Hill, Travis, Westerleigh, Willowbrook, and parts of Concord, Graniteville, Heartland Village, New Springville, and Rosebank. It also contains portions of the neighborhoods of Bay Ridge, Dyker Heights and Bath Beach in Brooklyn.

Most of the district's population lives in Staten Island. Freshkills Park, the Staten Island Greenbelt, Fort Hamilton, Dyker Beach Park and Golf Course, and Miller Field are also located within the district.

The district overlaps with Staten Island Community Boards 1, 2, and 3 and Brooklyn Community Boards 10 and 11. It is contained entirely within New York's 11th congressional district. It also overlaps with the 17th, 23rd, 24th and 26th districts of the New York State Senate, and with the 46th, 47th, 61st, 62nd, 63rd, and 64th districts of the New York State Assembly.

=== 2010s ===
District 50 covers a large swath of Mid-Island Staten Island, including the neighborhoods of New Dorp, Midland Beach, Dongan Hills, South Beach, Arrochar, Bloomfield, Bulls Head, Castleton Corners, Chelsea, Egbertville, Emerson Hill, Grant City, Grasmere, Lighthouse Hill, Manor Heights, Meiers Corners, Oakwood, Old Town, Richmondtown, Shore Acres, Todt Hill, Travis, Westerleigh, Willowbrook, and parts of Concord, Graniteville, Heartland Village, New Springville, and Rosebank.

Most of the district's population lives in its eastern half; to the west lies Freshkills Park, the Staten Island Greenbelt, and the remnants of Fresh Kills Landfill. Fort Wadsworth and Miller Field are also located within the district.

The district overlaps with Staten Island Community Boards 1, 2, and 3, and is contained entirely within New York's 11th congressional district. It also overlaps with the 23rd and 24th districts of the New York State Senate, and with the 61st, 62nd, 63rd, and 64th districts of the New York State Assembly.

=== 2000s ===
Between 2001 and 2010, the district covered Mid-Island, in addition to a portion of Dyker Heights and Bath Beach in Brooklyn. The Brooklyn portion was reallocated to the 43rd district following redistricting in 2013.

== Members representing the district ==
| Members | Party | Years served | Electoral history |
|---|---|---|---|
District established January 1, 1992
| John Fusco (West New Brighton) | Republican | January 1, 1992 – December 29, 1998 | Elected in 1991. Re-elected in 1993. Re-elected in 1995. Re-elected in 1997. Resigned when elected to the New York Surrogate's Court. |
| Vacant | | December 29, 1998 – February 1, 1999 | |
| James Oddo (Dongan Hills) | Republican | February 1, 1999 – December 31, 2013 | Elected to finish Fusco's term. Re-elected in 1999. Re-elected in 2001. Re-elected in 2003. Re-elected in 2005. Re-elected in 2009. Termed out. |
| Steven Matteo (Richmondtown) | Republican | January 1, 2014 – November 26, 2021 | Elected in 2013. Re-elected in 2017. Termed out and resigned early. |
| Vacant | | November 26, 2021 – November 30, 2021 | |
| David Carr (Grasmere) | Republican | November 30, 2021 – present | Elected in 2021 and seated early. Re-elected in 2023. Re-elected in 2025. |

== Recent election results ==
=== 2025 ===
The 2025 New York City Council elections will be held on November 4, 2025, with primary elections occurring on June 24, 2025.

2025 New York City Council election, District 50
| Party | Candidate | Votes | % |
|---|---|---|---|
| Republican | David Carr | 34,662 | |
| Conservative | David Carr | 2,818 | |
| Total | David Carr (incumbent) | 37,480 | 72.5 |
| Democratic | Radhakrishna Moran | 14,100 | 27.3 |
| Write-in | | 86 | 0.2 |
| Total votes | | 51,666 | 100.0 |
| Republican hold | | | |

=== 2023 (redistricting) ===
Due to redistricting and the 2020 changes to the New York City Charter, councilmembers elected during the 2021 and 2023 City Council elections will serve two-year terms, with full four-year terms resuming after the 2025 New York City Council elections.

2023 New York City Council election, District 50
| Party | Candidate | Votes | % |
|---|---|---|---|
| Republican | David Carr | 8,092 | |
| Conservative | David Carr | 1,626 | |
| Total | David Carr (incumbent) | 9,718 | 95.3 |
| Write-in | | 484 | 4.7 |
| Total votes | | 10,202 | 100.0 |
| Republican hold | | | |

=== 2021 ===
In 2019, voters in New York City approved Ballot Question 1, which implemented ranked-choice voting in all local primary and special elections. Under the new system, voters have the option to rank up to five candidates for every local office. Voters whose first-choice candidates fare poorly will have their votes redistributed to other candidates in their ranking until one candidate surpasses the 50 percent threshold. If one candidate surpasses 50 percent in first-choice votes, then ranked-choice tabulations will not occur.

The 50th district was one of three districts in the city in which the eventual winner did not receive the highest number of first-choice votes (the other two being the 9th and 25th districts).

2021 New York City Council election, District 50 Republican primary
| Party | Candidate | Maximum round | Maximum votes | Share in maximum round | Maximum votes First round votes Transfer votes |
|---|---|---|---|---|---|
| Republican | David Carr | 4 | 3,625 | 50.3% | |
| Republican | Marko Kepi | 4 | 3,583 | 49.7% | |
| Republican | Sam Pirozzolo | 3 | 2,172 | 26.5% | |
| Republican | Kathleen Sforza | 2 | 618 | 7.3% | |
| Republican | Jordan Hafizi | 2 | 414 | 4.8% | |
| Write-in | | 1 | 43 | 0.5% | |

An interactive map of District 50

2021 New York City Council election, District 50 general election
| Party | Candidate | Votes | % |
|---|---|---|---|
| Republican | David Carr | 21,286 | 59.8 |
| Democratic | Sal Albanese | 10,661 | |
| Staten Island 1st | Sal Albanese | 1,115 | |
| Total | Sal Albanese | 11,776 | 33.1 |
| Conservative | George Wonica | 2,503 | 7.0 |
| Write-in | | 50 | 0.1 |
| Total votes | | 35,615 | 100 |
| Republican hold | | | |

=== 2017 ===
2017 New York City Council election, District 50
| Party | Candidate | Votes | % |
|---|---|---|---|
| Republican | Steven Matteo | 21,735 | |
| Conservative | Steven Matteo | 3,447 | |
| Independence | Steven Matteo | 770 | |
| Reform | Steven Matteo | 180 | |
| Total | Steven Matteo (incumbent) | 26,132 | 79.6 |
| Democratic | Richard Florentino | 6,608 | 20.1 |
| Write-in | | 70 | 0.3 |
| Total votes | | 32,810 | 100 |
| Republican hold | | | |

=== 2013 ===
2013 New York City Council election, District 50
Primary election
| Party | Candidate | Votes | % |
|---|---|---|---|
| Republican | Steven Matteo | 3,083 | 55.2 |
| Republican | Lisa Giovinazzo | 2,504 | 44.8 |
| Write-in | | 3 | 0.0 |
| Total votes | | 5,590 | 100 |
| Democratic | John Mancuso | 3,192 | 61.5 |
| Democratic | Mendy Mirocznik | 1,990 | 38.4 |
| Write-in | | 5 | 0.1 |
| Total votes | | 5,187 | 100 |
General election
| Republican | Steven Matteo | 13,522 | |
| Conservative | Steven Matteo | 2,216 | |
| Independence | Steven Matteo | 557 | |
| Total | Steven Matteo | 16,295 | 63.5 |
| Democratic | John Mancuso | 8,611 | |
| Working Families | John Mancuso | 723 | |
| Total | John Mancuso | 9,334 | 36.4 |
| Write-in | | 27 | 0.1 |
| Total votes | | 25,656 | 100 |
| Republican hold | | | |

=== 2009 ===
2009 New York City Council election, District 50
| Party | Candidate | Votes | % |
|---|---|---|---|
| Republican | James Oddo | 14,844 | |
| Conservative | James Oddo | 1,692 | |
| Independence | James Oddo | 1,562 | |
| Working Families | James Oddo | 577 | |
| Total | James Oddo (incumbent) | 18,675 | 75.2 |
| Democratic | James Pocchia | 6,166 | 24.8 |
| Write-in | | 3 | 0.0 |
| Total votes | | 24,844 | 100 |
| Republican hold | | | |
