= List of Staten Island neighborhoods =

This is a list of neighborhoods on Staten Island, one of the five boroughs of New York City.

- Annadale
- Arden Heights
- Arlington
- Arrochar
- Bay Terrace
- Bloomfield
- Brighton Heights
- Bulls Head
- Castleton Corners
- Charleston
- Chelsea
- Clifton
- Concord
- Dongan Hills
- Egbertville
- Elm Park
- Eltingville
- Emerson Hill
- Fort Wadsworth
- Graniteville
- Grant City
- Grasmere
- Great Kills
- Greenridge
- Grymes Hill
- Hamilton Park
- Heartland Village
- Huguenot
- Lighthouse Hill
- Livingston
- Manor Heights
- Jefferson
- Mariners Harbor
- Meiers Corners
- Midland Beach
- New Brighton
- New Dorp
- New Springville
- Oakwood
- Old Place
- Old Town
- Pleasant Plains
- Port Ivory
- Port Richmond
- Prince's Bay
- Randall Manor
- Richmond Valley
- Richmondtown
- Rosebank
- Rossville
- Saint George
- Sandy Ground
- Shore Acres
- Silver Lake
- South Beach
- Stapleton
- Stapleton Heights
- Sunnyside
- Todt Hill
- Tompkinsville
- Tottenville
- Tottenville Beach
- Travis
- Ward Hill
- West New Brighton
- Westerleigh
- Willowbrook
- Woodrow

== See also ==
- List of Bronx neighborhoods
- List of Brooklyn neighborhoods
- List of Manhattan neighborhoods
- List of Queens neighborhoods
