= Kamillah Hanks =

American politician (born 1972)

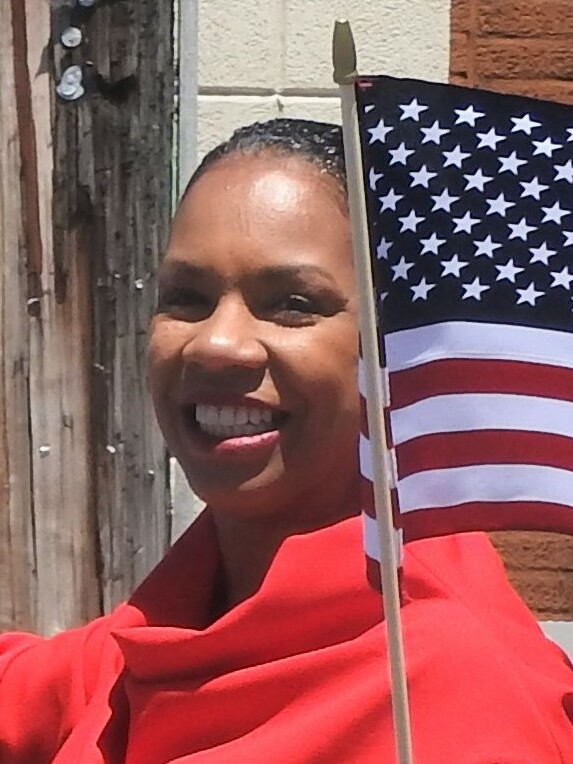

Majority Whip of the New York City Council
- Incumbent
- Assumed office January 15, 2026
- Speaker: Julie Menin
- Preceded by: Selvena Brooks-Powers

Member of the New York City Council from the 49th district
- Incumbent
- Assumed office January 1, 2022
- Preceded by: Debi Rose

Personal details
- Born: September 4, 1972 (age 54)
- Party: Democratic
- Education: College of Staten Island
- Website: Official website

Kamillah M. Hanks (born September 4, 1972) is an American politician and New York City Council Member for the 49th District on the North Shore of Staten Island.

District 49 includes the neighborhoods of Arlington, Clifton, Clove Lakes, Concord, Elm Park, Graniteville, Livingston, Mariners Harbor, New Brighton, Port Richmond, Randall Manor, Rosebank, St. George, Snug Harbor, Silver Lake, Stapleton, Sunnyside, West Brighton and Tompkinsville.

== Life and career ==
Kamillah Hanks is a lifelong resident of Staten Island and a mother of four. Hanks attended Fiorello H. LaGuardia High School of Music & Art and Performing Arts and studied marketing and finance at the College of Staten Island.

Prior to holding office, Hanks served on the New York City Council Districting Commission, as the Interim President of the Van Duzer Civic Association in Stapleton, and was the former executive director of the Downtown Staten Island Council. She also worked as a public relations consultant at the Staten Island Museum and the Staten Island Economic Development Corporation. In 2012 she founded the Historic Tappen Park Community Partnership, a 501(c)(3) dedicated to the upkeep and development of Tappen Park on Staten Island. In 2014, Hanks was appointed by Staten Island Borough President James Oddo to the New York City Panel for Educational Policy, and served as the Staten Island representative until 2016.

Hanks created the first YouthBuild program on Staten Island, which gives young adults who are unemployed and out of school access to advanced vocational education, leadership development, job training, and essential life skills. In 2020, during the COVID-19 pandemic, she partnered with local small business owners and YouthBuild program participants to develop a program that produced over 5000 face shields that were given to Staten Island firefighters, first responders, and medical personnel in the larger New York City area.

Hanks also helped found the Minority Women in Business Association of Staten Island in July 2020.

== New York City Council ==
In November 2021, Kamillah Hanks was elected to the New York City Council to represent the 49th District.

Hanks was appointed Chair of the Committee on Public Safety and serves as a member of the Committee on Civil Service and Labor, Committee on Education, Committee on Environmental Protection, Committee on Finance, Committee on Land Use, and the Subcommittee on Zoning and Franchises. As Chair of the Public Safety Committee, Council Member Hanks has chaired hearings on a number of topics, including, the Mayor's Blueprint to End Gun Violence, the Citywide Response to Hate Crimes and Discrimination, and Access to Firearms: City and State Efforts to Curb Gun Violence.

During Women's History Month in 2022, she hosted Staten Island's first Women in Business Expo. The Expo brought attention to women owned businesses on Staten Island and showcased over 60 vendors from local businesses.

During the Fiscal Year 2023 budget season, Hanks worked with fellow Staten Island City Council Members David Carr and Joe Borelli and City Council Speaker Adrienne Adams to secure $7 million in funding for the expansion of Richmond University Medical Center's NICU and PICU.

In 2024, Hanks opposed the City of Yes plan to increase housing supply in New York City. The plan proposed modest changes to zoning such as allowing owners of single-family homes and duplexes to add an extra unit on their lots, permit slightly more housing supply near transit stations, and ease the conversion of empty office buildings into housing. Hanks, who represents Staten Island which has produced very little housing in the last decade, said that any housing plan should "maybe use a scalpel as opposed to a hammer."

== Electoral history ==
=== 2025 ===
2025 New York City Council Democratic primary, District 49
Party	Candidate	Votes	%
Democratic	Kamillah Hanks (incumbent)	7,174	58.1
Democratic	Abou S. Diakhate	1,979	16.0
Democratic	Sarah Blas	1,902	15.4
Democratic	Telee N. Brown	1,100	8.9
Write-in		193	1.6
Total votes		12,348	100.0

2025 New York City Council election, District 49
Party	Candidate	Votes	%
Democratic	Kamillah Hanks (incumbent)	20,263	55.2
Republican	John E. Shea	12,490	34.1
Working Families	Sarah Blas	3,310	9.0
New North Shore	Sarah Blas	528	1.4
Total	Sarah Blas	3,838	10.5
Write-in		90	0.2
Total votes		36,681	100.0
Democratic hold			

=== 2023 ===
2023 New York City Council election, District 49
Party	Candidate	Votes	%
Democratic	Kamillah Hanks (incumbent)	6,859	79.2
Safe Streets SI	Ruslan Shamal	1,418	16.4
Write-in		380	4.4
Total votes		8,657	100.0
Democratic hold			

=== 2021 ===
2021 New York City Council Democratic primary, District 49
Party	Candidate	Maximum round	Maximum votes	Share in maximum round	Maximum votes First round votes Transfer votes
Democratic	Kamillah Hanks	9	5,996	56.9%	
Democratic	Amoy Barnes	9	4,536	43.1%	
Democratic	Ranti Ogunleye	8	2,329	20.4%	
Democratic	Kelvin Richards	7	1,929	15.8%	
Democratic	Selina Grey	6	1,657	13.1%	
Democratic	David Hernandez	5	1,190	9.1%	
Democratic	Michael P. Schnall	4	1,014	7.6%	
Democratic	Troy McGhie	3	869	6.4%	
Democratic	John F. McBeth Sr.	2	394	2.9%	
Write-In		1	53	0.4%	

2021 New York City Council election, District 49
Party	Candidate	Votes	%
Democratic	Kamillah Hanks	15,203	58.6
Republican	Patricia Rondinelli	10,081	38.8
Ordinary People	Jason R. Price	605	2.3
Write-in		76	0.3
Total votes		25,965	100.0
Democratic hold			
