= St. John Villa Academy =

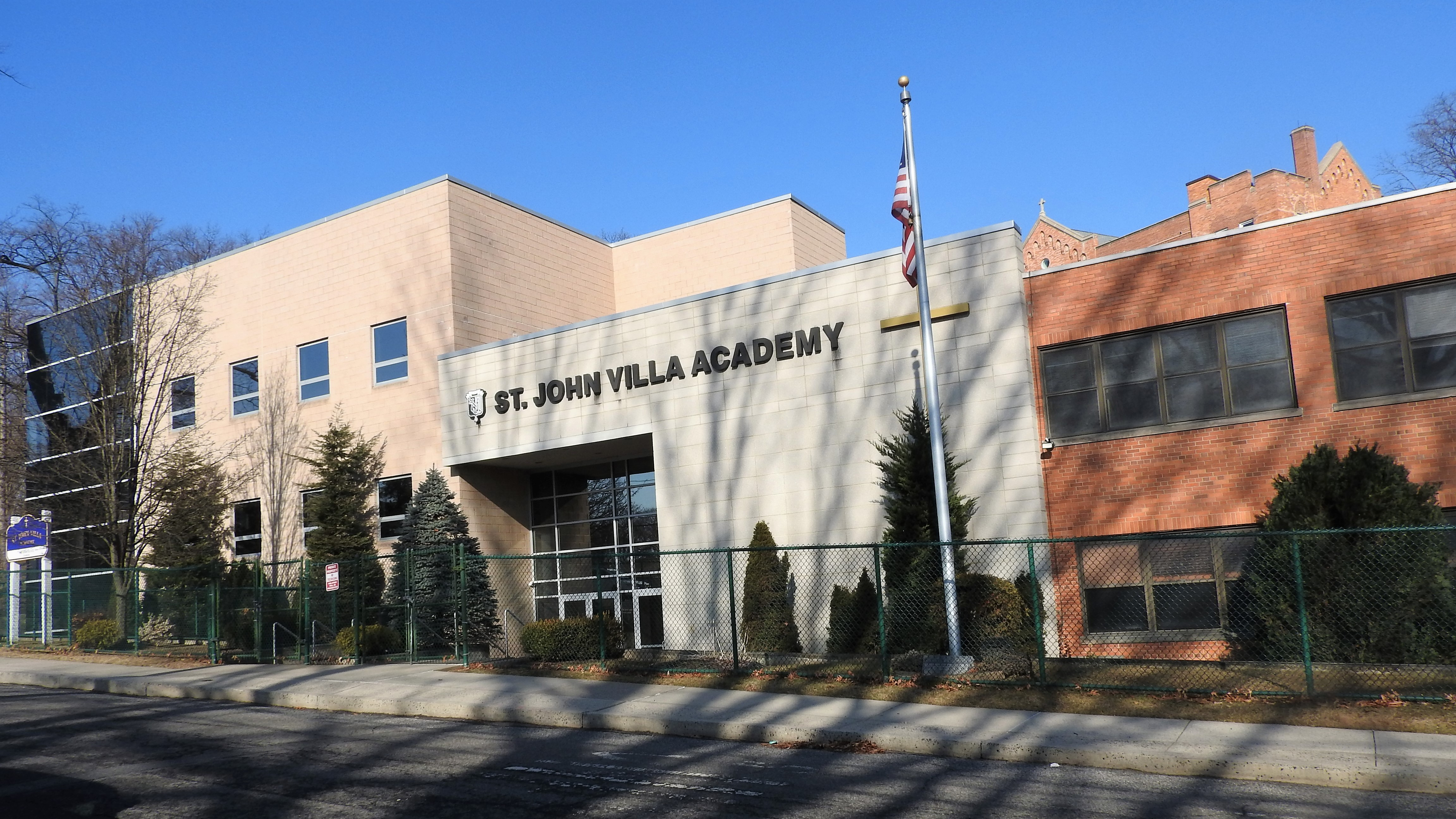

Location
- 26 Landis Avenue; New York City (Arrochar, Staten Island), New York 10305; United States; 40°36′5″N 74°4′7″W

Information
- Type: Private,
- Motto: Ecce Agnus Dei et Parate Viam Domini (Behold the Lamb of God and Prepare the Way of the Lord)
- Religious affiliations: Roman Catholic; Sisters of St. John the Baptist
- Established: 1922
- Closed: 2018
- President: Sr. Anita Gramer
- Principal: Sr. Antonia Zuffante
- Grades: K-12
- Student to teacher ratio: 13:1
- Campus size: 7 acres (28,000 m^{2})
- Colors: Blue and Gold
- Slogan: Values Formed...Talents Fostered...Dreams Fulfilled!
- Mascot: Bear
- Team name: Bears
- Accreditation: Middle States Association of Colleges and Schools
- Newspaper: Villa Voice
- Yearbook: Precursor
- Tuition: $8,100
- Website: http://www.sjva.org

St. John Villa Academy was a private, Roman Catholic School on Staten Island in New York, New York. Its senior high school was all girls, while the K-8 school was co-ed. The school was located within the Roman Catholic Archdiocese of New York. St. John Villa Academy, owned and operated by the Sisters of St. John the Baptist, was located on the east shore of Staten Island, in the Arrochar neighborhood, overlooking the Verrazzano–Narrows Bridge and Lower New York Bay.

It was operated by the Sisters of St. John the Baptist. St. John Villa Academy is located in Staten Island, New York, overlooking the Verrazzano Narrows Bridge. The elementary school had grades K-8, while the high school had grades 9–12. Enrollment in St. John Villa Academy was open to girls who have graduated from elementary school and who want a secondary level, college-preparatory education.

== History ==
St. John Academy was established in 1922 by the Sisters of St. John the Baptist. In September 1923, the Sisters opened a school called St. John's Novitiate and Boarding School. In June, 1926 the first class of students, numbering 24, graduated. In the early 1930s it was extended to the high school level.

The boarding school ceased operation in the 1970s. The main dormitory buildings can still be seen from Narrows Road South and were, in the school's later years, used as either classrooms or offices.

On Saturday, January 26, 2014, Villa Senior Dorothy O'Neill became the newest member of the 1,000 point club during a basketball game against Bishop Kearney HS. The 5-foot-4 O'Neill, who finished with 17 points (three 3-pointers), became only the fourth Villa player to reach 1,000 career points. She joins Christie Marrone, Nicole Capurso and Stephanie Klingele on the Bears' list of highest scorers.

In its final year, 2018, it had 214 K-8 students and 510 high school students. St. John Villa Academy Elementary School and St. John Villa Academy High School closed at the end of the 2017–2018 academic year. Lack of adequate personnel and faculty, a declining enrollment, and growing maintenance expenses of an aging facility forced the closure. The City bought the campus for use as a New York City public school. There were 76 students in the final graduating class. The school closed in June of that year.

== Campus ==
The school had a chapel and an elementary school facility dating from 1937 and 1931, respectively. A construction project broke ground in December 2004 and was completed in September 2006. Villa added a new building. As a result of high enrollment, SJVA developed a campus facility plan that would renovate existing buildings and increase the amount of space in the high school. Specifically, several of the oldest buildings on campus have proved unable to meet the space and program needs of faculty and students. In order to maintain programs and to expand other areas of the curriculum, SJVA proposed a $5 million renovation and construction project. The new classrooms were to be provided with "T1" Internet access lines. Of the $5 million in renovation and construction, $1 million must be raised from a capital campaign.

The School campus had grown. Additions include the construction of the current elementary school building in 1931, of a new chapel in 1938, of the high school building in 1957, and in the mid-1980s, of the gym.

== Academics and curriculum ==
St. John Villa Academy was a college preparatory high school with a wide range of academic challenges, while following the New York State Curriculum. Students must take and pass the New York State Regents subject examinations in order to graduate. Students must take and successfully complete three years of physical and biological science, three of English, three of a foreign language, four of mathematics, two of computer applications, and obtain one art credit to graduate. Academic and pre-professional electives and AP (Advanced Placement) courses were also offered. SJVA offered specialized classes which included AP and College Credits for St. John's University (New York).

The academy had an accelerated Scholars program in which students began AP classes in their sophomore year. Advanced classes in English, science, history, foreign language and mathematics were mandatory beginning in the freshman year for Scholars. New for the 2011–2012 school year, all students in the Scholars program must take Latin in their freshman and sophomore years.

== Athletics and clubs ==
St. John Villa Academy offers athletics and many after school clubs. After school athletics are important at St. John Villa. There are many athletic teams available for students to join, such as basketball, cheer-leading, soccer, softball, golf, tennis, lacrosse, swimming, and track. St. John Villa is recognized as a competitive athletics school and has received much recognition.

The following are clubs available for students: Art Club, Christian Service, Culture Club, Dance Club, Junior Statesmen of America, Lectors Club, newspaper (Villa Voice), Peer Leaders, Drama Club, Stage Crew, Student Council, Video Yearbook, and yearbook (Precursor).

Villa is also a member of the following national societies: National Honor Society, National Science Society, National Math Honor Society, and the International Thespian Society.

== High school ==
St. John Villa Academy was an accredited Catholic high school for young women and was established as such in 1932.

Current enrollment is 583 girls. The student-teacher ratio is 15:1 with an average class size of about 32.

SJVA offered college preparatory program for all students. Around fifty percent of seniors graduate eligible to receive college credits as a result of having satisfactorily completed Advanced Placement courses and courses taken through the St. John University Extension.

Villa's facilities included a full-size chapel, a multi-media library with 10,000+ volumes and 12 computer stations (all with internet access), a fully equipped gym/auditorium, two newly renovated biology and chemistry labs, Channel 13 Learning Link, a computer lab with 36 individual stations, an "Anytime, Anywhere Learning" laptop program, 23 TV/VCR stations with link hookups, and an art studio.

== Notable alumni ==
- David Carr, Member of the New York City Council from the 50th District
