= John Fusco (New York politician) =

American politician

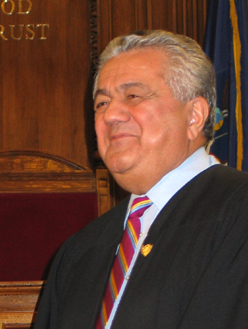
- Fusco in 2007

Member of the New York City Council from the 50th district
- In office January 1, 1992 – December 29, 1998
- Preceded by: None (district created)
- Succeeded by: James S. Oddo

Personal details
- Born: September 7, 1937 (age 89) New York City, U.S.
- Party: Republican
- Spouse: Carol Ann Odessa
- Education: Saint Peter's College (B.S.); New England Law - Boston (J.D.)
- Profession: Politician, Judge

Military service
- Allegiance: United States
- Branch/service: United States Army
- Years of service: 1963–1965
- Rank: First lieutenant

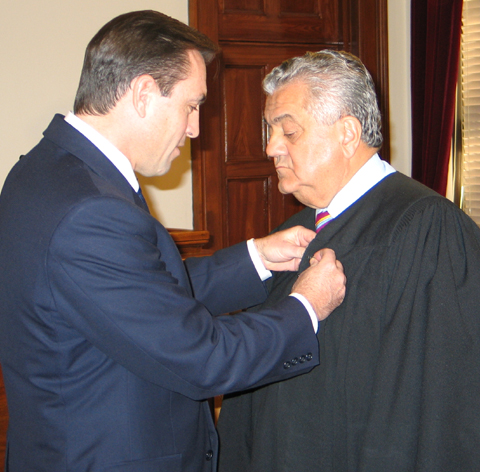
Vito Fossella honors John Fusco

John A. Fusco (born September 7, 1937) is an American lawyer, jurist, and politician from the New York City Borough of Staten Island.

Fusco represented parts of Central Staten Island and Bensonhurst, Brooklyn in the New York City Council until his election to the New York Surrogate's Court for Richmond County, New York in November 1998. He served as Minority Whip in the Council until his departure.

He was appointed to the New York Supreme Court by then Governor Eliot Spitzer in 2008, and reached the mandatory retirement age in 2013.

Political offices
Preceded by Newly created district	New York City Council, 50th district 1992–1998	Succeeded by James Oddo
Preceded by Vacant	Minority Whip, New York City Council; 1992–1998	Succeeded by Dennis P. Gallagher
