= Sal Albanese =

American politician

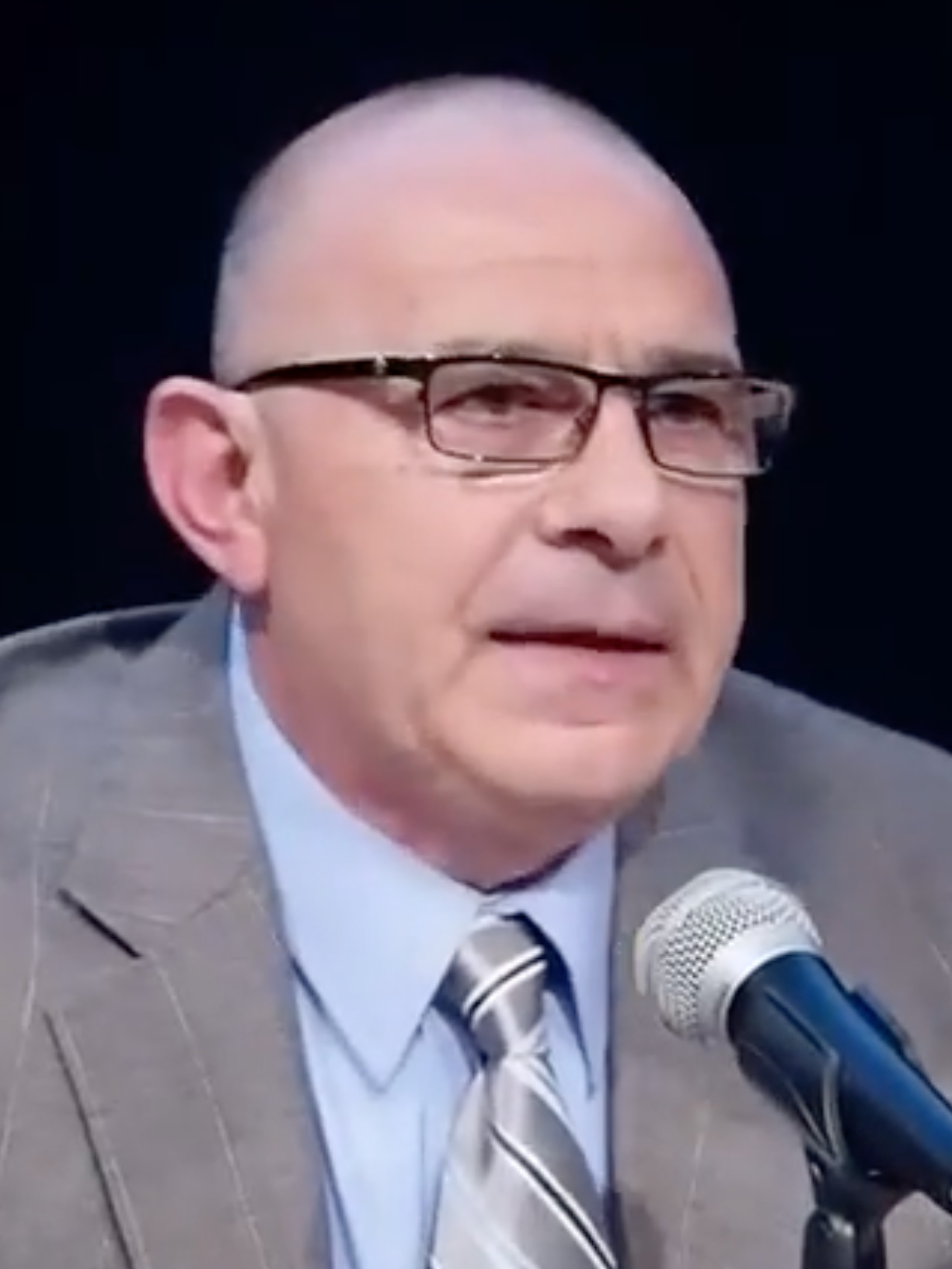
- Albanese in 2013

Member of the New York City Council
- In office January 1, 1983 – January 1, 1998
- Preceded by: Angelo J. Arculeo
- Succeeded by: Marty Golden
- Constituency: 31st district (1983–1991); 43rd district (1991–1998)

Personal details
- Born: August 29, 1949 (age 77) Mammola, Calabria, Italy
- Party: Democratic
- Other political affiliations: Reform (2017)
- Spouse: Lorraine Albanese
- Children: 2
- Education: York College, City University of New York; New York University; Brooklyn Law School

Sal F. Albanese (born August 29, 1949) is a politician from New York City. He served as a New York City Council member, and ran unsuccessfully for several other public offices including New York State Assembly, United States Congress, and Mayor of New York City.

== Personal and professional life ==
Albanese was born in Mammola, Calabria, Italy. He came to New York City when he was eight years old and was raised in Park Slope, Brooklyn. He attended Our Lady of Peace Grammar School and John Jay High School. He received his Bachelor of Arts in Education from York College, City University of New York in 1972. After graduating from York, he taught in the New York Public School system at his alma mater, John Jay High School, for eleven years. Concurrently, he earned a Master of Arts in Health from New York University in 1976.

Albanese was elected to the New York City Council in 1982. During his tenure, he earned a J.D. from Brooklyn Law School in 1990 and became a member of the New York State Bar. After leaving public office in 1998, he became Marketing Director for INVESCO and then Managing Director of Institutional Sales & Marketing for Mesirow Financial. He currently holds Series 7 and 63 Financial services licenses.

Albanese and his wife Lorraine lived in Bay Ridge, Brooklyn, before moving to Staten Island in 2017. The couple has two adult daughters, Danielle and Laura.

Following a failed bid for Mayor in 2013, Albanese returned to practicing law as Of Counsel at Allegaert Berger & Vogel LLP.

== Political career ==
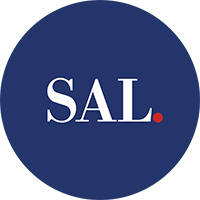
Albanese's logo for his 2017 campaign for Mayor

In 1978, Albanese ran for New York State Assembly in the 50th district, losing 44.25% to 55.75% to Republican Florence Sullivan. Four years later, he ran for City Council and defeated Angelo J. Arculeo 51.44% to 48.57%. Arculeo was a 21-year incumbent and Republican-Conservative Minority Leader. Albanese won reelection four times and represented the 43rd district in the City Council until 1997, when he became a candidate for Mayor of New York City. He received 21% in the Democratic primary in 1997, coming in third place.

In 1992, Albanese ran for United States Congress in the New York's 13th congressional district. He was defeated by Susan Molinari, who won 56.13% of the vote to Albanese's 38.24%. He returned to his work in the City Council thereafter.

As a Council Member, Albanese was a member of the Council’s Public Safety, Education, and Transportation committees. He drafted laws requiring mandatory drug testing for school bus drivers and overhauled the previously-failing High School of Telecommunications.

He supported increasing police presence in under-patrolled neighborhoods through community policing. He also initiated legislation requiring police to publish response times to emergency calls and led a successful effort to update the City's antiquated 9-1-1 system. Despite objections from Mayor Rudy Giuliani, Albanese passed the New York City Living Wage Bill in 1996, which "required some city contractors to pay higher minimum wages to their employees." He was also the original sponsor of a Campaign Finance Reform Bill, stating that "If the present system stays in place, you will continue to have a city run for a few wealthy interests and by big business." He famously voted against the proposed 1995 and 1996 budgets, arguing that they "balanced [the budget] on the backs of the middle class, poor, elderly and the youth of this city."

In the 1997 New York City mayoral election, Albanese ran for Mayor of New York City, placing third in the Democratic Party primary election. He earned 21.02% of the vote compared to Al Sharpton's 32.05% and winner Ruth Messinger's 40.19%. In 2000, he briefly entered the Mayoral race for a second time before bowing out early, citing the high cost of fundraising.

In 2008, he was part of then-Senator Barack Obama's New York delegation to the Democratic National Convention.

On December 14, 2012, Albanese opened a campaign for mayor in the 2013 New York City mayoral election. He placed eighth out of nine candidates in the Democratic Party primary, receiving 0.9% of the vote.

Albanese again ran for mayor in the 2017 New York City mayoral election. He finished second in the Democratic primary with approximately 15% of the vote, but secured the Reform Party's nomination and appeared on the general election ballot where he placed third behind incumbent Bill de Blasio and eventual Republican Congresswoman Nicole Malliotakis.

New York City mayoral election, 2017 Democratic primary
Party	Candidate	Votes	%
Democratic	Bill de Blasio (incumbent)	326,361	74.6%
Democratic	Sal Albanese	66,636	15.2%
Democratic	Michael Tolkin	20,445	4.7%
Democratic	Robert Gangi	13,537	3.1%
Democratic	Richard Bashner	10,538	2.4%
Total votes		437,517	100.0%

New York City mayoral election, 2017
Party	Candidate	Votes	%
Democratic	Bill de Blasio (incumbent)	726,361	66.5%
Republican	Nicole Malliotakis	303,742	27.8%
Reform	Sal Albanese	22,891	2.1%
Green	Akeem Browder	15,763	1.4%
Independent	Michael Tolkin	10,762	1.0%
Independent	Bo Dietl	10,592	1.0%
Libertarian	Aaron Commey	2,635	0.2%
Total votes		1,092,746	100.0%
Democratic hold			

Albanese became the Democratic candidate for a City Council seat representing Staten Island in 2021, but conceded defeat to Republican David Carr.
