= Leticia Remauro =

American writer

Leticia M. Remauro is an American businesswoman, politician, and author. In her campaign for Staten Island borough president in 2021, she placed third in the primary election for the Republican Party nomination, and placed third in the general election as the Conservative Party candidate. In 2020, at a rally protesting COVID-19 restaurant closures by Governor Andrew Cuomo and Mayor Bill de Blasio, Remauro used the phrase "Heil Hitler" while criticizing Sheriffs' enforcement of the safety regulations.

== Career ==
=== Political involvement ===
Remauro was the Republican candidate for New York State Assembly 60th District in 1994, running against then-incumbent Eric Vitaliano. She also ran as an Alternate Delegate to the Republican National Convention in 2000, and served as a Staten Island representative of Mayor Rudolph Giuliani and Governor George Pataki.

From 1999 to 2002, Remauro served as Chair of the Richmond County Republican Committee. Remauro also served as Executive Director of New York State Victory 2000, a political organization created by the New York Republican State Committee to oversee the 2000 presidential election in New York State.

Remauro served as Chair of Staten Island Community Board 1 from 2009 to 2015. During her tenure, the board voted to approve the New York Wheel and Empire Outlets adjacent to the St. George Ferry Terminal and created a plan for the North Shore Waterfront Greenway Trail.

Remauro is the president and CEO of The Von Agency, Public Relations, Inc. based out of Staten Island, which provides publicity and social media for politician Nicole Malliotakis and controversial artist Scott LoBaido. In 2016, Remauro was named one of Staten Island's 50 most influential residents (excluding elected officials) by City & State magazine.

On November 5, 2018, she announced her bid for Staten Island borough president, three years ahead of the election. Remauro, who revealed her plans on Spectrum News NY1, said she thought she could better serve Staten Island in Borough Hall. "The rumor is true. I'm looking at the borough presidency in 2021," said Remauro. "I love Staten Island, I love my community. I was chair of the community board for some of the biggest land use deals, so I think I can serve my community." She placed third in the 2021 Republican primary, and continued running as the Conservative Party candidate.

Remauro was criticized when she compared COVID-19 safety regulations to the policies of Adolf Hitler. In a selfie video that she posted to social media during a local protest on December 2, 2020, she lambasted Sheriffs' deputies and claimed to be there "to stand up for our right, the right to pay taxes so that we can pay the salaries of these good men and women, who yes, are only doing their job, but not for nothing, sometimes you got to say 'Heil Hitler,' not a good idea to send me here, we're not going to do it." Trump endorsed Republican candidate Vito Fossella, who went on to win the position.

=== Community involvement ===
Remauro serves as secretary of the Staten Island Downtown Alliance, a local development corporation with a mission of attracting and retaining small business in the Downtown Staten Island area.

=== Author ===
Remauro is the author of two self-published books, Patric's Saga and I'm Not Fat, I'm Just Big Boned and Other Lies We Tell Ourselves.
