= S53 and S93 buses =

Bus routes in Brooklyn and Staten Island, New York

s53 s93
- Verrazzano–Narrows Bridge/Clove Road
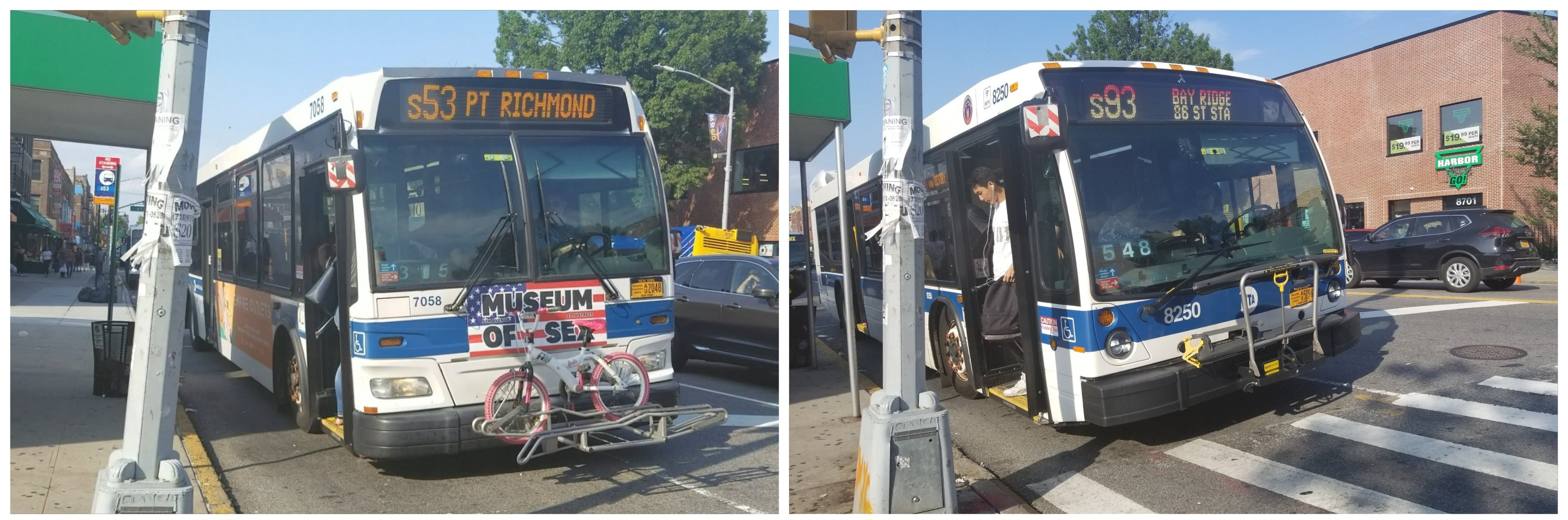
- A 2011 Orion VII 3G (7058) on the Port Richmond-bound S53 awaiting departure, and a 2016 Nova Bus LFS (8250) on the S93 Limited terminated, at Bay Ridge near the 86th Street subway station

Overview
- System: MTA Regional Bus Operations
- Operator: New York City Transit Authority
- Garage: Castleton Depot
- Vehicle: Orion VII EPA10; Nova Bus LFS
- Began service: 1989-1990 (S53); August 27, 2001 (S93)

Route
- Locale: Staten Island and Brooklyn, New York, U.S.
- Communities served: Bay Ridge, Arrochar, Concord, Sunnyside, Castleton Corners, Willowbrook, West New Brighton, Port Richmond
- Start: Bay Ridge - 4th Avenue & 86th Street
- Via: Brooklyn: 92nd Street, 4th Avenue, 86th Street, Fort Hamilton Parkway; Staten Island: Clove Road, Broadway (S53), Castleton Avenue (S53), Victory Boulevard (S93)
- End: Port Richmond - Richmond Terrace & Port Richmond Avenue (S53); Willowbrook - College of Staten Island (S93)
- Length: 9.4 miles (15.1 km) (S53); 8.7 miles (14.0 km) (S93)
- Other routes: S62/S92 Victory Blvd; S79+ Hylan Boulevard/Richmond Avenue South SBS

Service
- Operates: 24 hours (S53); Weekdays (S93)
- Annual patronage: 1,727,535 (S53, 2025); 743,323 (S93, 2025)
- Transfers: Yes
- Timetable: S53; S93

The S53 and S93 constitute a public transit line in New York City, running primarily on Clove Road and utilizing the Verrazzano–Narrows Bridge to travel between Brooklyn and Staten Island. They are operated by the MTA Regional Bus Operations under the New York City Transit Authority brand.

== Route description ==
=== S53 ===
The S53 begins in Bay Ridge at Fourth Avenue and 86th Street. Between here and Fort Hamilton Parkway-92nd Street, Bay Ridge-bound buses run via Fort Hamilton Parkway and 86th Street whereas Staten Island-bound buses run via Fourth Avenue and 92nd Street. From here, it continues a short distance east of 92nd Street before turning onto the Gowanus Expressway and continues across the Verrazzano–Narrows Bridge to Staten Island until using Exit 15W to run south on Lily Pond Avenue. It then runs west on McClean Avenue, north on Fingerboard Road and south on Hylan Boulevard. It then runs northwest on Clove Road, passing by Grasmere station. At Targee Street, Port Richmond-bound buses make a dogleg turn to access the westbound Staten Island Expressway Service Road, where it joins the S93. The S53 continues west and returns to running northwest on Clove Road until turning north onto Broadway, where it runs until Castleton Avenue. It turns west on said road until reaching Port Richmond Avenue, where it turns north until reaching the Port Richmond Terminal at Richmond Terrace.

When school is in session, one trip to Port Richmond originates at Forest Avenue near Anning S. Prall Intermediate School 27 at 2pm. Three more trips to Port Richmond leave Michael J. Petrides School at 2:28pm, heading to Clove Road via Milford Drive.

=== S93 ===
The S93 shares the route with the S53 until reaching Staten Island, where it uses exit 15W to run on Narrows Road until Targee Street, where it meets and once again follows the S53 until reaching Victory Boulevard. It runs west on Victory Boulevard, before later turning south onto Loop Road, entering the College of Staten Island campus and terminating at the South Administration Building on Administrative Loop.

The S93 employs a limited-stop service, making limited stops between Bay Ridge and Victory Boulevard-Clove Road and making S92 stops west of there (local west of Jewett Avenue). It does not run on weekends.

== History ==
The R7 was created on November 21, 1964, the same day the Verrazzano–Narrows Bridge was opened, and ran across the bridge to provide service between Brooklyn and Staten Island, running between Fourth Avenue-95th Street and Clove Road-Victory Boulevard. A lot of patrons used the route on weekends for a scenic ride during the initial operation year. On November 3, 1965, the route was extended to Port Richmond, with the former Victory Boulevard terminal being delegated to a short-turn terminus.

In 1976, when the Sunnyside Campus of the College of Staten Island opened, a R7 special started operating between Bay Ridge and the campus, making significantly less stops compared to the normal R7. Sometime between April 2, 1989, and April 15, 1990, the R7 was relabeled the S53. The R7 special and Victory Boulevard short turn were discontinued at an unknown date. Between November 1994 and January 1996, the Clove Road-Grasmere station overpass was replaced. During this replacement, the S53 was rerouted to run via Old Town Road between Hylan Boulevard and Richmond Road and Targee Street.

In July 2001, the MTA announced plans to create a limited-stop variant of the S53 named the S93 (which would start in September 2001) to provide service between Brooklyn, the Victory Boulevard corridor and the College of Staten Island, which had relocated to Willowbrook eight years prior. It would cost an additional $112,000 a year to operate and would also have the benefit of eliminating double fares and would save up to 15 minutes. It would run 3 trips in each direction: to CSI with hourly headways in the morning and to Bay Ridge with bi-hourly headways in the evening. Expected to benefit over 2,000 students, the S93 started service on slightly earlier on August 27, 2001.

As the service proved to be wildly popular and successful, it received multiple improvements over the years. In September 2006, reverse-peak service was added to the route and on April 9, 2007, stops were added along Narrows Road North/South at either street of the Richmond Road/Targee Street couplet, Hylan Boulevard and Fingerboard Road. On May 21, 2007, to decongest the busy Fourth Avenue-86th Street intersection, the S93 terminal was moved one block south to 87th Street. On January 20, 2013, the S93 was extended from the CSI entrance to inside of the CSI campus at the Administrative Loop. Even further improvements came when, as part of $4.9 million service enhancements, midday and evening service was added to the S93 on September 2, 2014.

On September 6, 2015, the MTA started a pilot program by the name of Bike & Ride. This pilot installed bike racks on the fronts of S53 and S93 buses, with each bike rack being able to accommodate two bikes. In 2017, the MTA released its Fast Forward Plan, aimed at speeding up mass transit services. As part of this program, the bike racks on the S53 and S93 buses would be a permanent addition.

== Incidents ==
On April 5, 2012, a bus operator of a Brooklyn-bound S53 ran over a twin-size mattress that was littered. The mattress was carried over the Verrazano-Narrows Bridge and the springs broke the gas tank open, sending gas into the gutter and causing a chain reaction of flames. All passengers aboard were evacuated in time before the bus caught fire. Nobody got hurt in the process.

In 2025, a Brooklyn-bound S93 Limited also suffered from a fire.
