= Manor Heights, Staten Island =

Neighborhood in New York City

Coordinates: 40°36′06″N 74°07′14″W

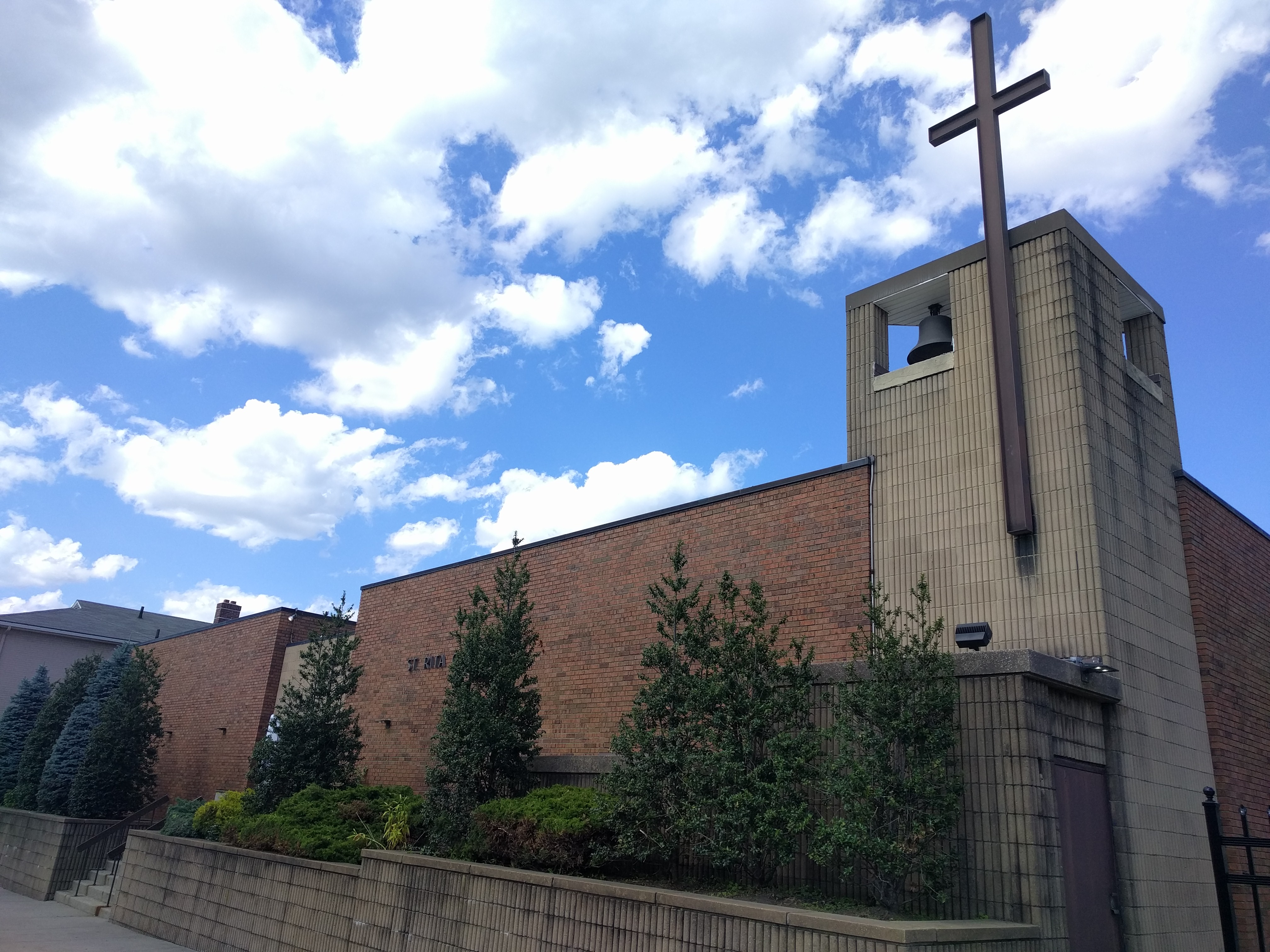
Saint Rita's Church

Manor Heights is a neighborhood located in Staten Island, New York City. Manor comes from the fact that the neighborhood is adjacent to Manor Road, a major thoroughfare in the North Shore of Staten Island, and Heights due to the area's sudden elevation within its boundaries. The neighborhood's loose boundaries include the areas south of the Staten Island Expressway, north of Brielle Avenue, which is the location of Susan E. Wagner High School, to the west of Manor Road, and to the east of Bradley Avenue.

Locally, the neighborhood is sometimes considered an overlapping of the Willowbrook, Meiers Corners and Todt Hill sections of Staten Island.

The area quickly populated with the rapid growth of Staten Island's population caused by the opening of the Verrazzano–Narrows Bridge among other factors. The neighborhood consists of relatively small, one-family homes. Manor Heights is the site of Susan E. Wagner High School, opened in 1968 to accommodate the island's growing population. A residential complex for low-income seniors, operated by the Sisters of Charity, was later built on land adjacent to the high school. Manor Heights also includes Public School 54 which is located in Willowbrook Rd

Manor Heights is served by the S54, S57, S61 and S91 local buses and the SIM31, SIM32 and SIM33 express buses.

== Demographics ==
For census purposes, the New York City Department of City Planning classifies Manor Heights as part of a larger Neighborhood Tabulation Area called Todt Hill-Emerson Hill-Lighthouse Hill-Manor Heights SI0203. This designated neighborhood had 32,822 inhabitants based on data from the 2020 United States Census. This was an increase of 1,971 persons (6.4%) from the 30,851 counted in 2010. The neighborhood had a population density of 7.8 inhabitants per acre (14,500/sq mi; 5,600/km^{2}).

The racial makeup of the neighborhood was 62.8% (20,597) White (Non-Hispanic), 4.1% (1,348) Black (Non-Hispanic), 19.8% (6,486) Asian, and 3% (971) from two or more races. Hispanic or Latino of any race were 10.4% (3,420) of the population.

According to the 2020 United States Census, this area has many cultural communities of over 1,000 inhabitants. This include residents who identify as Puerto Rican, German, Irish, Italian, Indian, and Chinese.

The largest age group was people 55-74 years old, which made up 24.9% of the residents. 75.1% of the households had at least one family present. Out of the 10,623 households, 57.1% had a married couple (22.4% with a child under 18), 3.1% had a cohabiting couple (1.2% with a child under 18), 14.3% had a single male (1.6% with a child under 18), and 25.4% had a single female (3.9% with a child under 18). 32.7% of households had children under 18. In this neighborhood, 30.3% of non-vacant housing units are renter-occupied.
