= David Carr (New York politician) =

American politician

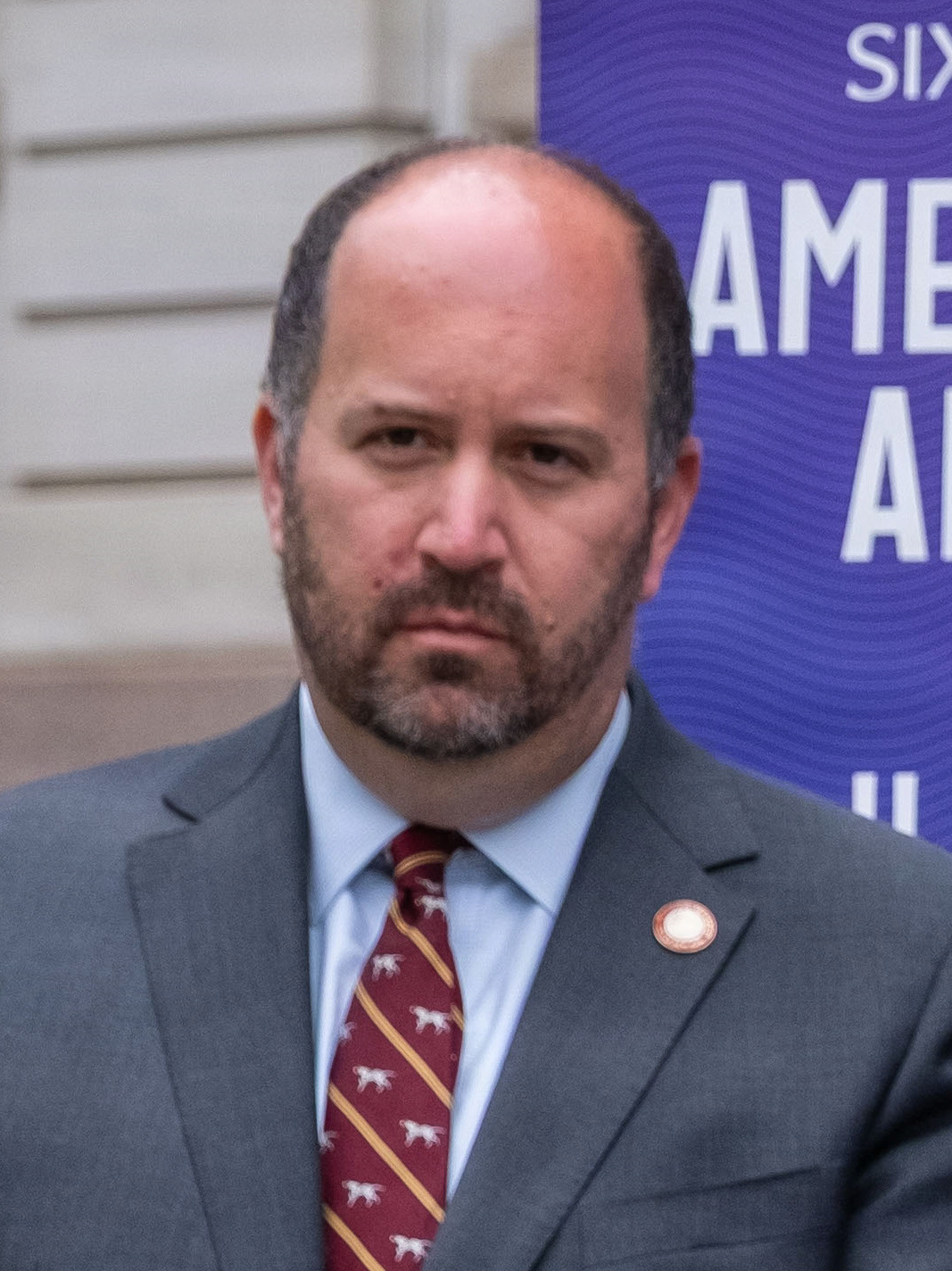
- Carr in 2026

Minority Leader of the New York City Council
- Incumbent
- Assumed office January 7, 2026
- Preceded by: Joann Ariola
- In office January 28, 2025 – February 7, 2025
- Preceded by: Joe Borelli
- Succeeded by: Joann Ariola

Member of the New York City Council from the 50th district
- Incumbent
- Assumed office November 30, 2021
- Preceded by: Steven Matteo

Personal details
- Born: August 28, 1987 (age 39) New York City, New York, U.S.
- Party: Republican
- Education: Georgetown University (BA)
- Website: Official website

David Carr (born August 28, 1987) is an American politician serving as the New York Council Member for the 50th Council District. He is a Republican, and the minority leader of the council.

His district was formerly located only on Staten Island but now also encompasses part of Brooklyn.

== Life and career ==
David Carr was born on Staten Island and is a lifelong resident of the Grasmere section of the borough. He attended local schools including the former St. John Villa Academy and Monsignor Farrell High School. Carr went on to earn a B.A. from Georgetown University. His first senior role in local government was as chief of staff to then-assemblyman Joe Borelli and later in the same position for council member and later New York City Council minority leader Steven Matteo.

== Elections to New York City Council ==
Carr became a candidate for the 50th Council District of the New York City Council in 2020, and sought to be the latest in a continuous line of representatives for that seat going back to its creation in 1991 when John Fusco was first elected. Since then, each new council member had been the chief of staff of his immediate predecessor. Carr was endorsed by the Staten Island Republican Party.

As one of five candidates in the primary, Carr made his campaign about public safety by calling for 6,000 new police officers to be hired over the ensuing five fiscal years, and the restoration of qualified immunity to New York City Police Department officers. The contest became contentious as Carr accused an opponent, Marko Kepi, of illegal ballot harvesting including the registering of a dead person to vote and of forging signatures to get absentee ballots. This in turn led to recriminations of racism and vote manipulation. After losing a manual recount, Kepi took the matter to court where the presiding judge noted disturbing patterns in the signatures on the absentee envelopes. Ultimately, Carr prevailed in all court challenges, sustaining his win of the GOP nomination.

In the general election, Carr defeated Sal Albanese (Democrat) and George Wonica (Conservative). He was sworn in early to take over for the remainder of Matteo's unexpired term after the latter left to lead a Staten Island not-for-profit. Carr became the only openly gay Republican elected representative for Staten Island and the first openly gay Republican on the City Council.

Carr was unopposed for re-election in 2023 as the nominee of the Republican and Conservative parties. He was re-elected to a final four-year term in 2025 also as the Republican and Conservative nominee with over 75% of the vote.

== Council tenure ==
Carr passed two pieces of legislation in his first term. The first required the New York City Department of Buildings to give fee waivers for those seeking permits to build back after a fire after caused by a defect and to give permit fee waivers for those seeking to correct that same defect before a fire would happen in their homes. The second allowed the city to set a different interest rate on unpaid property taxes for individuals and families that entered into a repayment plan with the New York City Department of Finance in order to give them a lower interest payment.

As chair of the Italian Caucus, Carr has strongly supported the retention of Columbus Day as a holiday. He is a member of the LGBTQIA+ Caucus.

In 2024, amid a housing shortage in New York City, Carr voted against a proposal (City of Yes) to permit construction of 80,000 new housing units across the city over a 15-year period. He argued that the environmental effects of new housing had not been studied.

Carr was elected Minority Leader of the council's Republican caucus on January 28, 2025 because he had more seniority than Councilwoman Ariola and there was a tie vote. The vote was disputed as a quorum was not present (attendance via Zoom was not factored into the numerical quorum). Speaker Adams had to intervene. The council's attorney recommended against certifying the vote. Carr became the first gay person elected leader of the Republican caucus or Republican conference of the New York City Council. Councilwoman Ariola served as the minority leader until January 7, 2026.

On January 7, 2026, Carr was elected to his second term as minority leader of the New York City Council. With former councilwoman Kristy Marmorato losing re-election to Shirley Aldebol in 2025, councilwoman Joann Ariola lost a vote during the private election. Vickie Paladino, Frank Morano and Inna Vernikov supported Carr. He became the only openly gay person elected leader of the New York City Republican caucus twice within less than one year.

== Borough President campaign ==
In April 2026, Carr announced that he intends to run for Staten Island Borough President in 2029.

== Electoral history ==
=== 2026 ===
2026 New York City Council minority leader election * denotes incumbent
Party	Candidate	Votes	%
Republican	David Carr (District 50)	4 (Note: The four votes for Carr were cast by Carr himself, Frank Morano, Vickie Paladino, and Inna Vernikov.)	80.0
Republican	Joann Ariola* (District 32)	1 (Note: The one vote for Ariola was cast by Ariola herself.)	20.0
Total votes		5	100.0
Votes necessary		3	>50.0

=== 2025 ===
January 2025 New York City Council minority leader election
Party	Candidate	Votes	%
Republican	David Carr (District 50)	3 (Note: The three votes for Carr were cast by Joe Borelli, Carr himself, and Inna Vernikov.)	50.0
—	Absent	3 (Note: The three absences were from Joann Ariola, Kristy Marmorato, and Vickie Paladino.)	50.0
Total votes		3	100.0
Votes necessary		4	>50.0

February 2025 New York City Council minority leader election
Party	Candidate	Votes	%
Republican	Joann Ariola (District 32)	3 (Note: The three votes for Ariola were cast by Ariola herself, Kristy Marmorato, and Vickie Paladino.)	60.0
—	Absent	2 (Note: The two absences were from David Carr and Inna Vernikov.)	40.0
Total votes		3 (Note: One seat (District 51) was vacant at the time of the election due to Joe Borelli's resignation.)	100.0
Votes necessary		3	>50.0

2025 New York City Council election, District 50
Party	Candidate	Votes	%
Republican	David Carr	32,972	67.8
Conservative	David Carr	2,635	5.4
Total	David Carr (incumbent)	35,607	73.2
Democratic	Radhakrishna Mohan	12,953	26.6
Write-in		74	0.2
Total votes		48,634	100.0
Republican hold			

=== 2023 ===
2023 New York City Council election, District 50
Party	Candidate	Votes	%
Republican	David Carr	7,526	79.5
Conservative	David Carr	1,525	16.1
Total	David Carr (incumbent)	9,051	95.6
Write-in		413	4.3
Total votes		9,464	100.0
Republican hold			

=== 2021 ===
2021 New York City Council Republican primary, District 50
Party	Candidate	Maximum round	Maximum votes	Share in maximum round	Maximum votes First round votes Transfer votes
Republican	David Carr	5	3,625	50.3%	
Republican	Marko Kepi	5	3,583	49.7%	
Republican	Sam Pirozzolo	4	2,172	26.5%	
Republican	Kathleen Sforza	3	618	7.3%	
Republican	Jordan Hafizi	2	414	4.8%	
Write-In		1	43	0.5%	

2021 New York City Council election, District 50
Party	Candidate	Votes	%
Republican	David Carr	21,286	59.8
Democratic	Sal Albanese	10,661	29.9
Staten Island 1st	Sal Albanese	1,115	3.1
Total	Sal Albanese	11,776	33.1
Conservative	George S. Wonica	2,503	7.0
Write-in		50	0.1
Total votes		35,615	100.0
Republican hold			

== See also ==
- LGBT culture in New York City
- List of LGBT people from New York City

== Notes ==
Political offices
Preceded by Joe Borelli	Minority Leader of the New York City Council; 2025	Succeeded by Joann Ariola
Preceded by Joann Ariola	Minority Leader of the New York City Council; 2026–present	Incumbent
