= Isle of Meadows =

Island in Staten Island, New York, United States

Coordinates: 40°34′37″N 74°12′12″W

Geography
- Total islands: 1
- Area: 0.352 km^{2} (0.136 sq mi)

Administration
- United States
- State: New York (state)
- City: New York City
- Borough: Staten Island

Demographics
- Population: Uninhabited

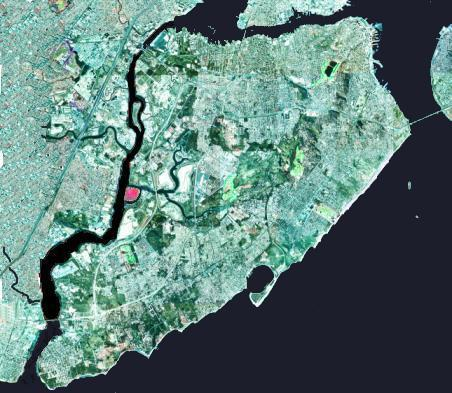
The Isle of Meadows, shown in red, along the western side of Staten Island

The Isle of Meadows (also known as the Isle of Meadow) is an 87-acre (0.35 km^{2}) uninhabited island in the New York City borough of Staten Island in the United States. It is located along the western side of Staten Island, where the Fresh Kills estuary empties into the Arthur Kill. It is adjacent across the waterway to Freshkills Park, the site of the former Fresh Kills Landfill. The island is owned by the city of New York, and which holds it as a nature preserve providing meadow and salt marsh nesting habitat for herons, ibises, and egrets, which is not open to the public.
