= Concord, Staten Island =

Neighborhood in New York City

Coordinates: 40°36′30″N 74°05′04″W

Concord is a neighborhood located in the borough of Staten Island in New York City, New York, United States.

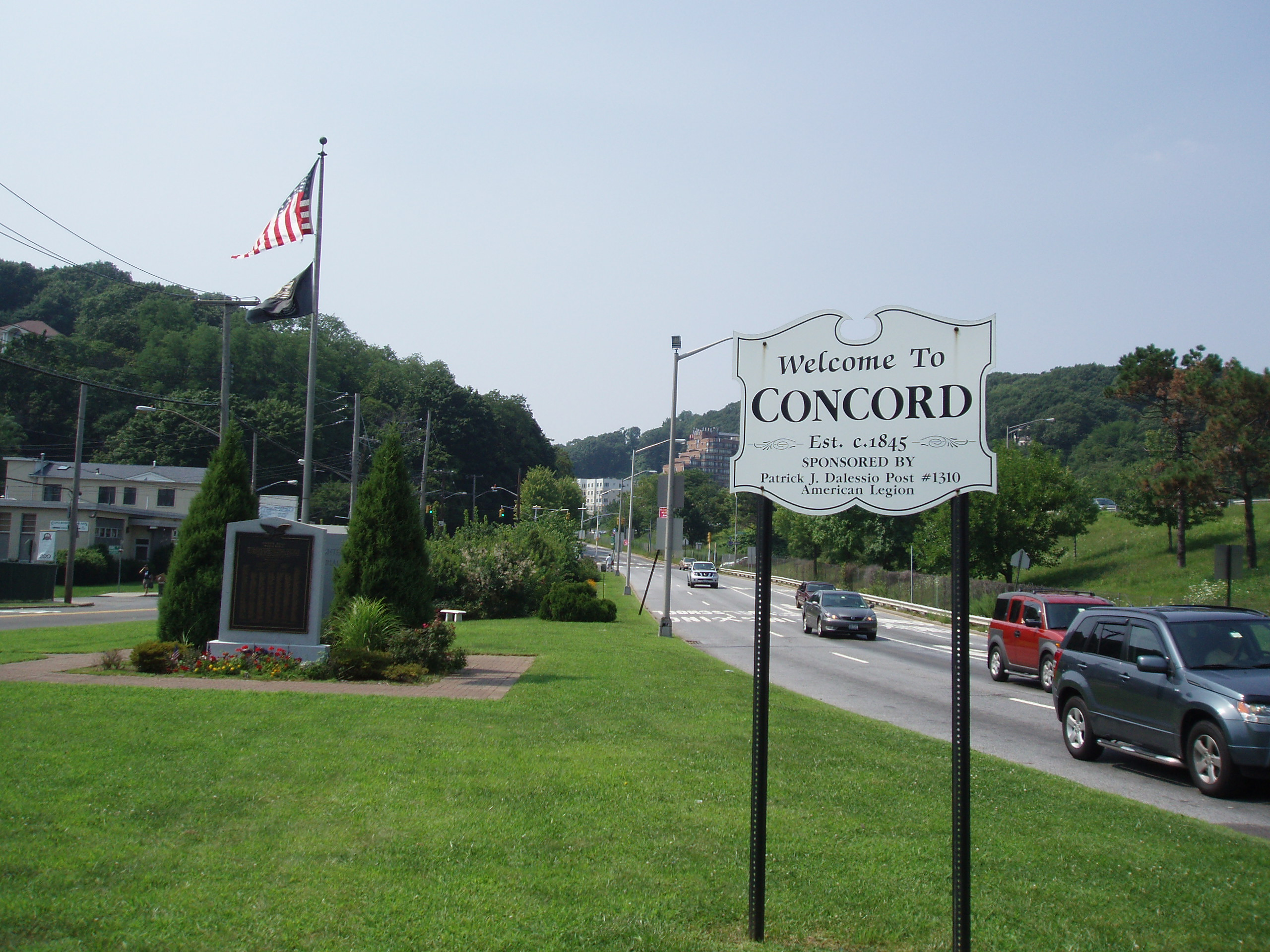
Welcome To Concord

Located in northeastern Staten Island, and bordered by the neighborhoods of Grasmere, Clifton, Dongan Hills, Emerson Hill, and Old Town, Concord was named Dutch Farms originally, but was renamed in 1845 after Concord, Massachusetts as a consequence of that town's historical significance. Early residents of Concord included Judge William Emerson (brother of Ralph Waldo Emerson and for whom nearby Emerson Hill is named) and Henry David Thoreau. In the early 19th Century, Concord had a dominant German immigrant population. Today, it is ethnically diverse.

Concord currently consists of one-family homes, small apartment buildings, and condominiums. The neighborhood's center is traversed by some of the most heavily traveled roads on Staten Island, including Clove Road; Richmond Road; Targee Street; and the Staten Island Expressway.

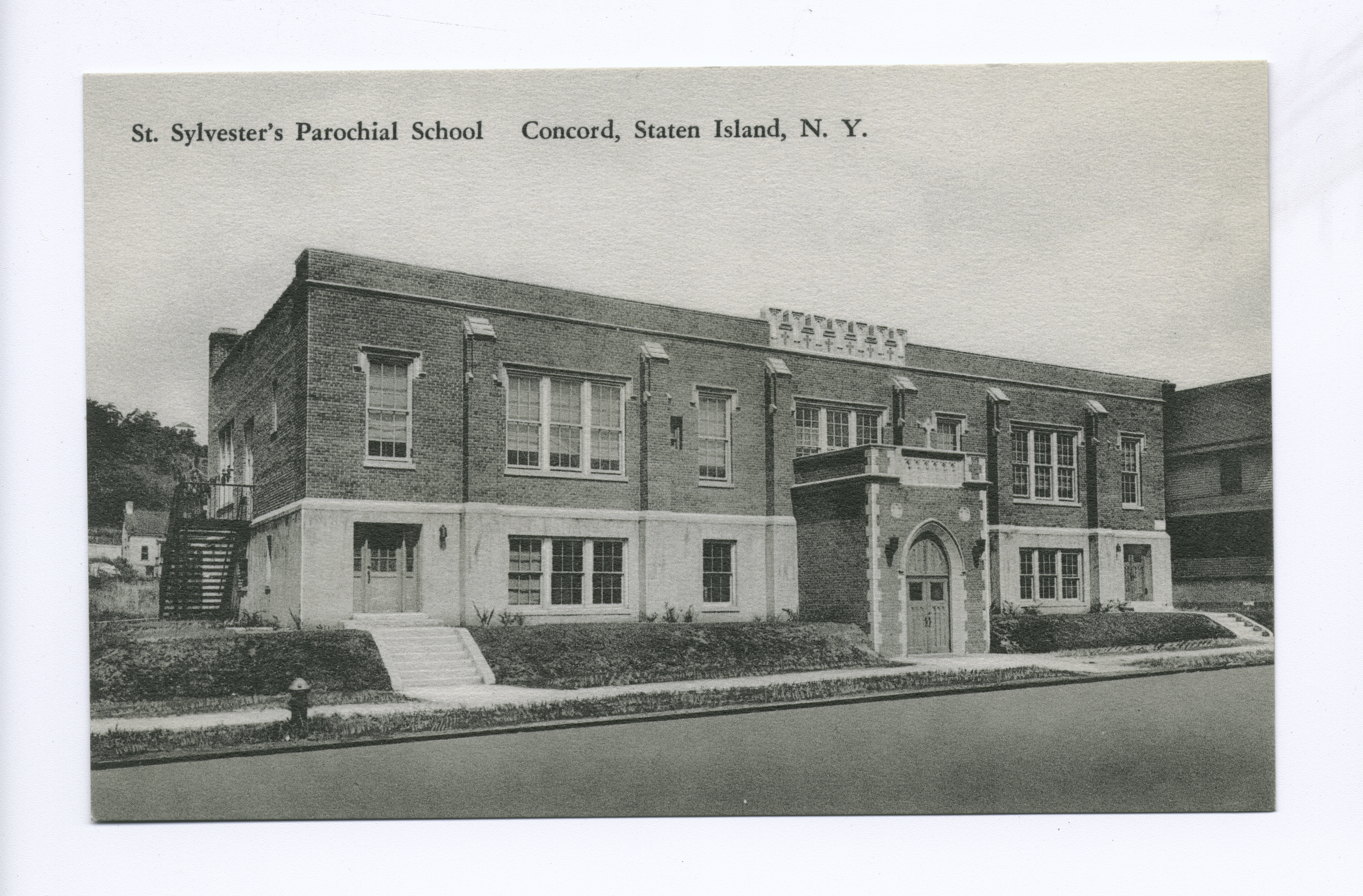
St. Sylvester's School, early 20th century

Much property in Concord was condemned to make way for the Staten Island Expressway in the early 1960s; a principal east–west thoroughfare. Price Street is now a service road of the expressway and is known as Narrows Road North.

In 1985, Staten Island's first mosque opened in Concord; it later moved to Tompkinsville, however.

== Education ==
The New York City Department of Education operates public schools. Concord is served by PS 48 on Targee Street. A small public alternative high school, named Concord High School, is located in the neighborhood, which is also home to a large medical arts complex (on Ralph Place) that had sprung up around the former Doctor's Hospital of Staten Island, which closed in 2003.

The Roman Catholic Archdiocese of New York operates Staten Island Catholic schools. In its first year of existence — 1961-62 — Monsignor Farrell High School used an annex of St. Sylvester's Elementary School in Concord while the construction of its permanent campus in Oakwood was being completed. St. Sylvester School in Concord closed in 2011. In its final year it had 120 students, which meant it was 31% utilized.

== Transportation ==
Concord is served by the S74, S76, S84 and S86 buses on Targee Street, the S53 and S93 on Clove Road/Narrows Road, and the SIM15 and SIM35 express buses to Manhattan.
