= Arrochar, Staten Island =

Neighborhood in New York City

Coordinates: 40°35′56″N 74°04′20″W

Arrochar (ə-ROH-shər) is a neighborhood in northeastern Staten Island in New York City, United States. It is located directly inland of Fort Wadsworth and South Beach, on the east side of Hylan Boulevard south of the Staten Island Expressway; the community of Grasmere borders it on the west. It is today primarily a neighborhood of one- and two-family homes and small businesses.

== History ==
Prior to the arrival of Europeans in the late 17th century Staten Island, the area was the site of a Lenape encampment. The name "Arrochar" comes from the estate of William Wallace MacFarland in the 1840s, who named it for his hometown of Arrochar in Scotland, the seat of the ancient chiefs of the Clan MacFarlane.

At the beginning of the 20th century the neighborhood became a fashionable gateway to the resort communities of South Beach and Midland Beach. The house of the MacFarland estate is now part of the grounds of St. Joseph Hill Academy, a Catholic girls school. Across Landis Avenue from St. Joseph Hill Academy sits St. John Villa Academy, a now-defunct all-girls Catholic high school. Throughout the 20th century it became a residential neighborhood for various ethnic groups, Italian-Americans being chief among them. Arrochar today is still inhabited by many Italians and has a growing Chinese-American community as well.

== Demographics ==
For census purposes, the New York City Department of City Planning classifies Arrochar as part of a larger Neighborhood Tabulation Area called Grasmere-Arrochar-South Beach-Dongan Hills SI0201. This designated neighborhood had 36,259 inhabitants based on data from the 2020 United States Census. This was an increase of 1,834 persons (5.3%) from the 34,425 counted in 2010. The neighborhood had a population density of 19.9 inhabitants per acre (14,500/sq mi; 5,600/km^{2}).

The racial makeup of the neighborhood was 57.7% (20,914) White (Non-Hispanic), 5.0% (1,828) Black (Non-Hispanic), 17.9% (6,499) Asian, and 2.7% (979) from two or more races. Hispanic or Latino of any race were 16.7% (6,039) of the population.

According to the 2020 United States Census, this area has many cultural communities of over 1,000 inhabitants. This include residents who identify as Mexican, Puerto Rican, Albanian, German, Irish, Italian, Polish, Russian, African-American, and Chinese.

The largest age group was people 50-64 years old, which made up 22.4% of the residents. 70.0% of the households had at least one family present. Out of the 12,811 households, 46.4% had a married couple (18.2% with a child under 18), 4.4% had a cohabiting couple (1.7% with a child under 18), 19.1% had a single male (1.7% with a child under 18), and 30.1% had a single female (5.3% with a child under 18). 31.6% of households had children under 18. In this neighborhood, 42.8% of non-vacant housing units are renter-occupied.

== Education ==
Arrochar is served by the elementary school P.S.39 and St. Joseph Hill Academy (which is both elementary and high school).

== Transportation ==
Arrochar once had its own train station, on the South Beach Branch of the Staten Island Railway. The station was located at Major Avenue. This station was abandoned when the SIRT discontinued passenger service on the South Beach Branch to Wentworth Avenue at midnight on March 31, 1953, because of city-operated bus competition. The tracks of the South Beach line have been removed and homes now stand on its former right-of-way.

Due to its proximity to the Verrazzano–Narrows Bridge, Arrochar is served by the SIM1, SIM5, SIM6, SIM7 and SIM10 express buses to and from Manhattan; the S53, S79 SBS and S93 buses to and from Brooklyn; and the S51, S52, S78 and S81 intra-borough buses.

== See also ==
- List of Staten Island neighborhoods
