= Old Town, Staten Island =

Neighborhood in New York City

Coordinates: 40°35′45″N 74°05′09″W

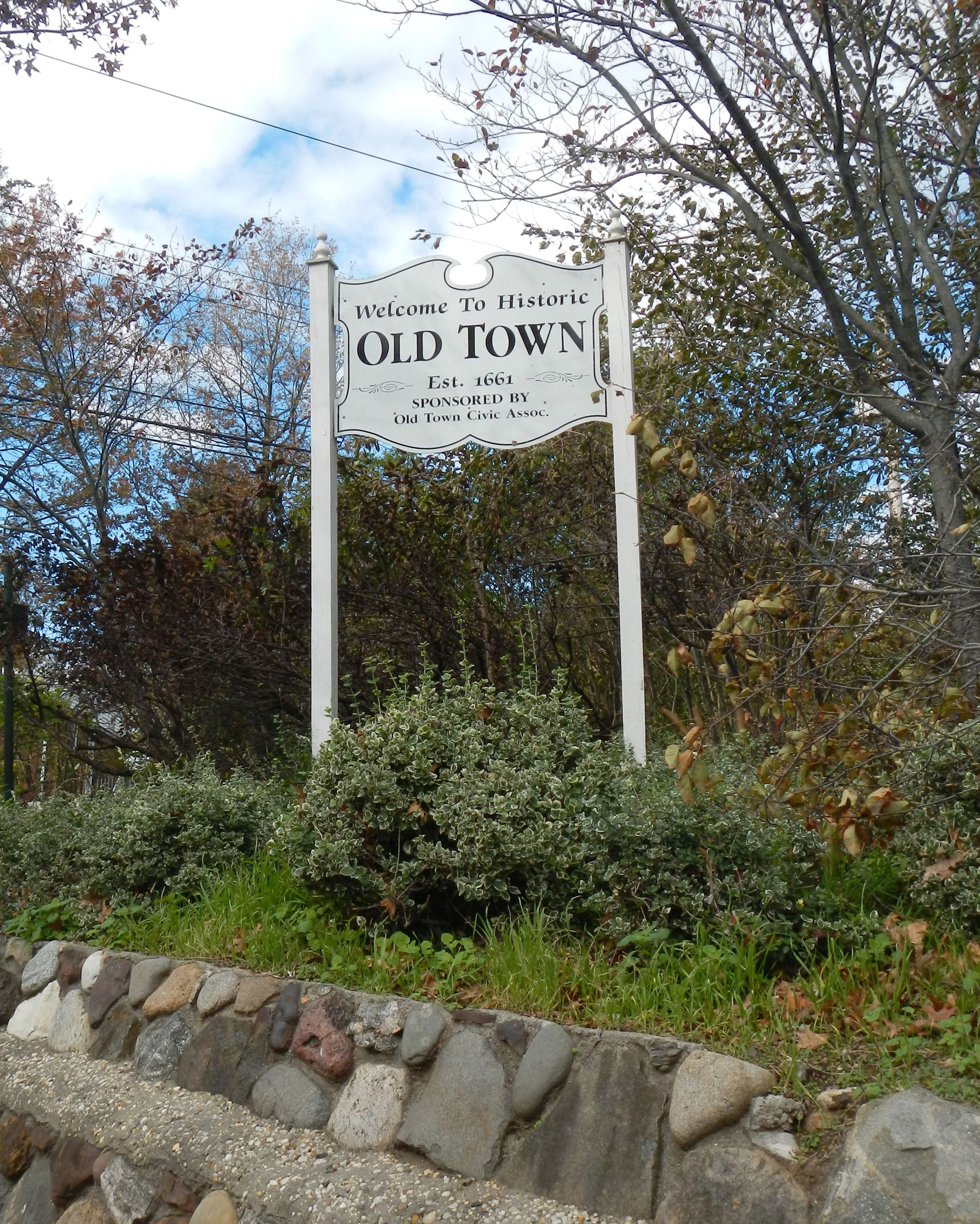
Welcome to Old Town sign, corner of Old Town Road and North Railroad Avenue

Old Town is a neighborhood in the New York City borough of Staten Island, located on its East Shore. Old Town was established in August 1661 as part of New Netherland, and was the first permanent European settlement on Staten Island. Originally described as "Oude Dorpe" ('old village' in Dutch), much of its original territory makes up what is present-day South Beach, with parts of Midland Beach and Dongan Hills. The area was settled by a group of Dutch, Walloon (from what is now southern Belgium and its borders with France) and French Protestants (Huguenots) led by Walloon Pierre Billiou.

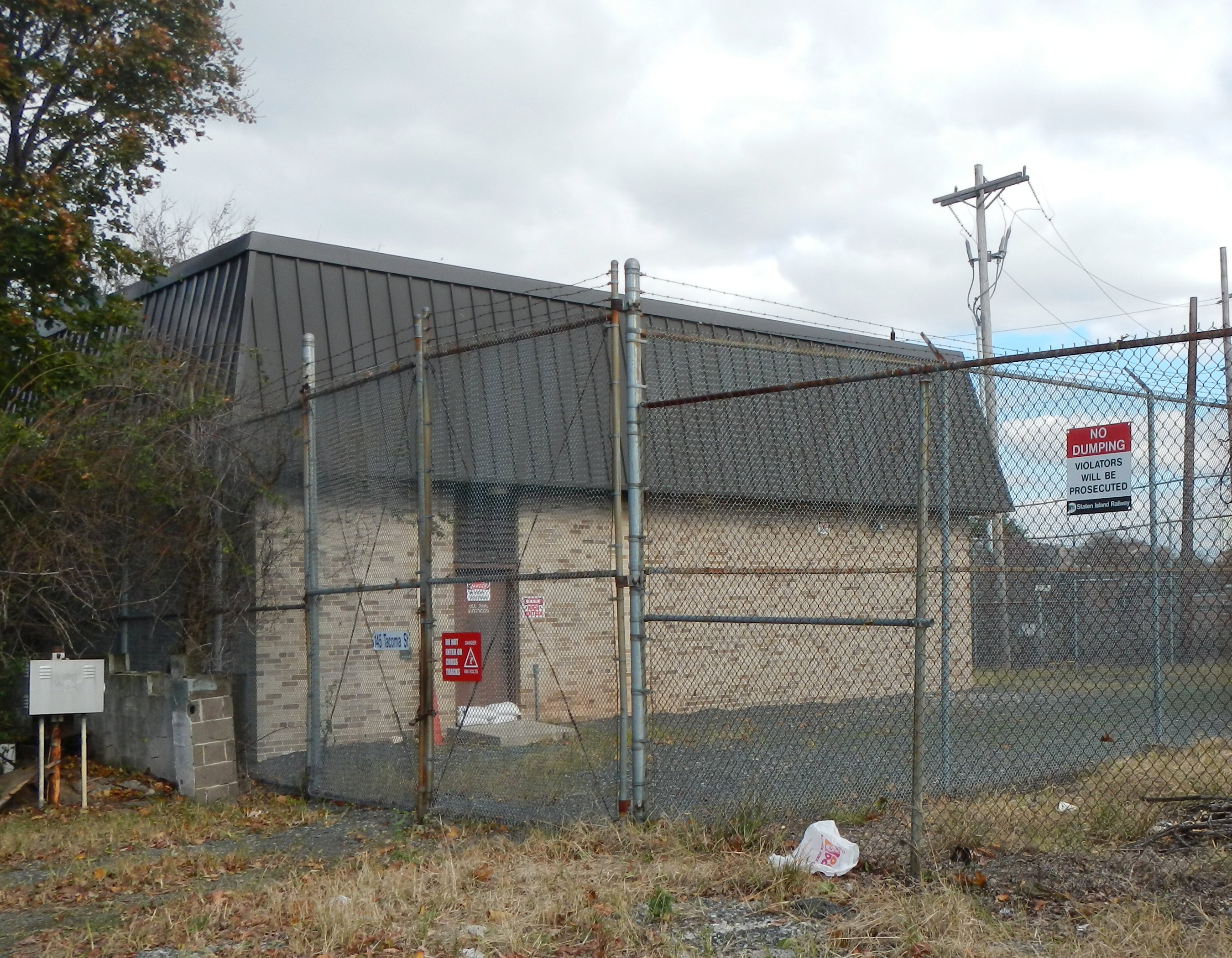
Staten Island Railway's Old Town Powerhouse at 145 Tacoma Street and North Railroad Avenue. This structure, built in the 1980s, replaced an earlier structure that had been destroyed by fire.

Present-day Old Town is typically described as the neighborhood bordered by Grasmere to the north, Dongan Hills to the south, South Beach to the east, and Concord to the west. The neighborhood is served by the Old Town station of the Staten Island Railway. Old Town is also served by the S78 and S79 SBS local buses on Hylan Boulevard and the S74, S84, S76 and S86 local buses on Richmond Road. Express bus service is provided by the SIM1 and SIM5 on Hylan Boulevard and the SIM15 on Richmond Road.

== Demographics ==
For census purposes, the New York City Department of City Planning classifies Grasmere as part of a larger Neighborhood Tabulation Area called Grasmere-Arrochar-South Beach-Dongan Hills SI0201. This designated neighborhood had 36,259 inhabitants based on data from the 2020 United States Census. This was an increase of 1,834 persons (5.3%) from the 34,425 counted in 2010. The neighborhood had a population density of 19.9 inhabitants per acre (14,500/sq mi; 5,600/km^{2}).

The racial makeup of the neighborhood was 57.7% (20,914) White (Non-Hispanic), 5.0% (1,828) Black (Non-Hispanic), 17.9% (6,499) Asian, and 2.7% (979) from two or more races. Hispanic or Latino of any race were 16.7% (6,039) of the population.

According to the 2020 United States Census, this area has many cultural communities of over 1,000 inhabitants. This include residents who identify as Mexican, Puerto Rican, Albanian, German, Irish, Italian, Polish, Russian, African-American, and Chinese.

The largest age group was people 50-64 years old, which made up 22.4% of the residents. 70.0% of the households had at least one family present. Out of the 12,811 households, 46.4% had a married couple (18.2% with a child under 18), 4.4% had a cohabiting couple (1.7% with a child under 18), 19.1% had a single male (1.7% with a child under 18), and 30.1% had a single female (5.3% with a child under 18). 31.6% of households had children under 18. In this neighborhood, 42.8% of non-vacant housing units are renter-occupied.

== Notable places ==
The neighborhood was home to the campus of Staten Island's largest circulation daily, the Staten Island Advance, a newspaper that likes to refer to Old Town as either Grasmere or Dongan Hills, even though its residents refer to it as Old Town.

The Academy of St. Dorothy, a private Roman Catholic elementary school sits on Hylan Boulevard in Old Town.

Carmel Richmond Healthcare and Rehabilitation Center (formerly Carmel Richmond Nursing Home), a Roman Catholic nursing home sits on Old Town Road. The home was established by the sisters of the Carmelite Order in the 1970s.

A Very Special Place, a school for developmentally disabled children was opened on Quintard Street in the late 1990s.

== Notable people ==
James Oddo, an American politician and member of the New York City Council is a former resident of Old Town.
