= Meiers Corners, Staten Island =

Neighborhood in New York City

Meiers Corners
- Neighborhood
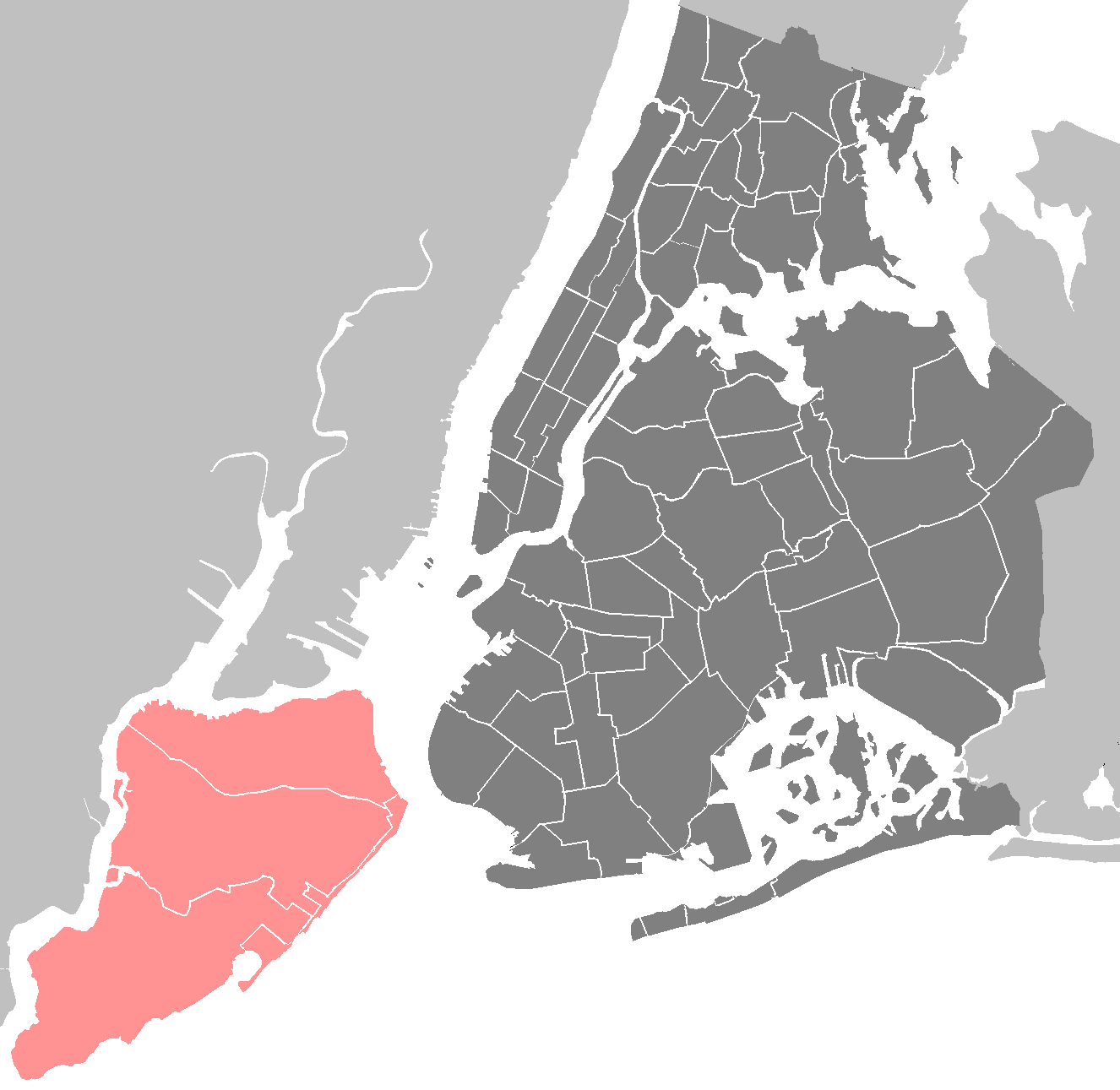
- Location of Meiers Corners in Staten Island Location of Meiers Corners in New York state
- Coordinates: 40°36′45″N 74°7′49″W
- Country: United States of America
- State: New York
- County: Richmond (Coterminous)
- City: New York City
- Borough: Staten Island

Meiers Corners is a neighborhood on Staten Island, one of the five boroughs of New York City, United States.

== Location ==
Meiers Corners is sometimes confused with the adjacent neighborhood of Westerleigh; however, Westerleigh is generally understood to mean the area immediately west of Castleton Corners that is also north of Victory Boulevard, while Meiers Corners is south of that line. The name "Meiers Corners" is also applied to the commercial district where Watchogue Road, Jewett Avenue, Victory Boulevard and Bradley Avenue all meet, and where three city bus routes terminated until the early 1980s.

== History ==
The area is named for a prominent 18th-Century Dutch resident named Joachim Meier, who lived at the Martling-Cozine House — one of the oldest private homes standing on Staten Island until it was demolished in 1981. The house stood near the corner of Watchogue Road and Bradley Avenue.

South of Victory Boulevard, the altitude gradually increases, and the south end of the neighborhood is situated on a high plateau (sometimes referred to as Manor Heights) where can be found Susan E. Wagner High School. Opened in 1968, the school was named for the late wife of former mayor Robert F. Wagner Jr., and was built to meet the increased demand for classroom space caused by the borough's population surge that accompanied the opening of the Verrazzano–Narrows Bridge in 1964.

== Demographics ==
The area along Bradley Avenue has the highest percentage of Asians on Staten Island, at roughly 24% of the population.

== Transportation ==
Meiers Corners is served by the S57, S61, S62, S91, S92 and S93 local bus routes and the SIM31, SIM32 and SIM33 express bus routes.
