= Bulls Head, Staten Island =

Neighborhood in New York City

Coordinates: 40°36′26″N 74°09′45″W

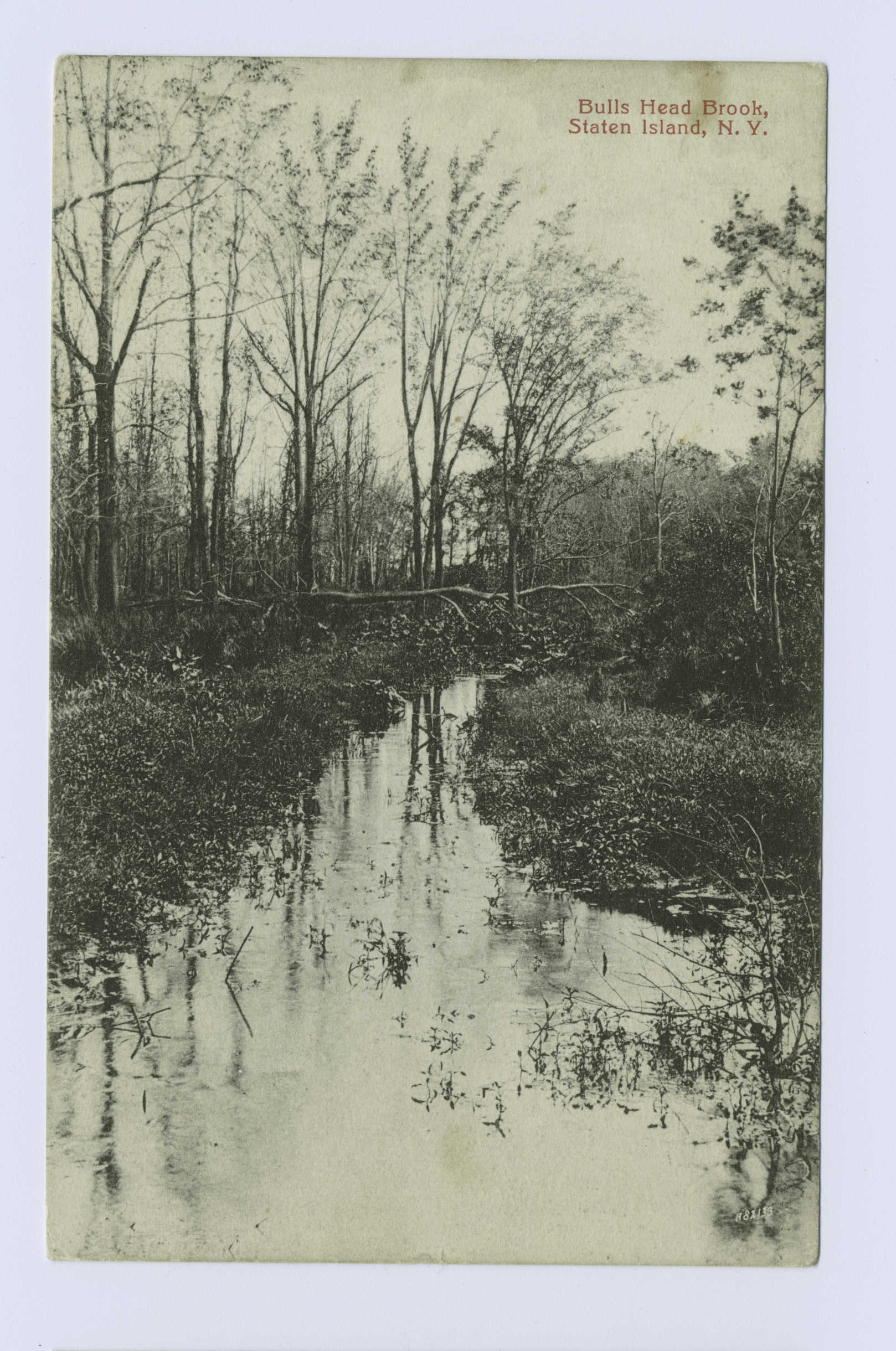
Bulls Head Brook

Bulls Head is a neighborhood in west-central Staten Island, one of the five boroughs of New York City. It is bordered by New Springville to the south, Bloomfield to the west, Willowbrook to the east, Graniteville to the north, and Westerleigh to the north.

== History ==
The community received its name from an 18th-century tavern located at the intersection of Victory Boulevard and Richmond Avenue (the neighborhood's central point), from which a sign bearing a bull's head was displayed. The Bulls Head area was also known as Phoenixville.

During the American Revolution, this tavern became the local headquarters of the faction loyal to the British crown, or Tories, as they were colloquially known. The Bulls Head Tavern burned down in 1871.

As recently as the early 1960s, Bulls Head and the surrounding neighborhoods, such as Willowbrook to the east and Graniteville to the north, were dominated by farmland. Dramatic change came soon after the Verrazzano–Narrows Bridge opened in 1964, opening up the area to residential development. Soon many Jewish families, mostly from the boroughs of Brooklyn and Queens, settled in Bulls Head and other west mid-island neighborhoods. A smaller number of Asian immigrants live in Bulls Head. Many of the residents are Italian Catholics served by Our Lady of Pity R.C. Church.

== Demographics ==
For census purposes, the New York City Department of City Planning classifies Bulls Head as part of a larger Neighborhood Tabulation Area called New Springville-Willowbrook-Bulls Head-Travis SI0204. This designated neighborhood had 42,871 inhabitants based on data from the 2020 United States Census. This was an increase of 3,561 persons (9.1%) from the 39,310 counted in 2010. The neighborhood had a population density of 8.5 inhabitants per acre (14,500/sq mi; 5,600/km^{2}).

The racial makeup of the neighborhood was 59.5% (25,502) White (Non-Hispanic), 3.0% (1,295) Black (Non-Hispanic), 19.6% (8,401) Asian, and 2.6% (1,136) from two or more races. Hispanic or Latino of any race were 15.2% (6,537) of the population.

According to the 2020 United States Census, this area has many cultural communities of over 1,000 inhabitants. This include residents who identify as Mexican, Puerto Rican, Albanian, German, Irish, Italian, Polish, Russian, Egyptian, Korean, and Chinese.

71.0% of the households had at least one family present. Out of the 10,773 households, 51.0% had a married couple (20.7% with a child under 18), 4.4% had a cohabiting couple (1.4% with a child under 18), 16.8% had a single male (1.5% with a child under 18), and 27.9% had a single female (3.9% with a child under 18). 31.8% of households had children. In this neighborhood, 33.4% of non-vacant housing units are renter-occupied.

== Education ==
Bulls Head's schools are the elementary school P.S. 60 and the intermediate school I.S. 72. Most of the residents are zoned for Port Richmond High School. The Todt Hill Library is nearby, at 2550 Victory Boulevard.

== Transportation ==
Bulls Head is served by the S44, S59, S62, S89, S92 and S94 local buses and the SIM4, SIM4C, SIM8, SIM8X, SIM32 and SIM33 express buses.

== Notable people ==
People who were born in, residents of, or otherwise closely associated with Bulls Head include:

- Jennifer Esposito (born 1973), actress
- Matt Festa (born 1993), MLB pitcher
