= Willowbrook, Staten Island =

Neighborhood in New York City

Coordinates: 40°36′12″N 74°08′19″W

Willowbrook is a neighborhood in Staten Island, one of the five boroughs of New York City. It is located in the region of the island usually referred to as Mid-Island, immediately to the south of Port Richmond, to the west of Meiers Corners and Westerleigh, to the north of New Springville, and to the east of Bulls Head.

== History ==
Named for a brook that flowed through the area's farmland, Willowbrook once lay at the heart of the island's agricultural zone, and first saw other significant development when a military hospital opened there during World War II. After the war ended the property became the site of Willowbrook State School, a state-run institution for intellectually disabled children that became the scene of a national scandal in the 1970s when it was revealed that the children housed there were the victims of widespread abuse and neglect. The facility was forced to close by 1987, and six years later a campus of the College of Staten Island opened at the site. Willowbrook Park, a large city park, borders the college on the west. It was also home to the Seaview Hospital tuberculosis sanatorium, added to the National Register of Historic Places in 2005.

The neighborhood was also drastically transformed with the opening of the Verrazzano–Narrows Bridge in November 1964. Soon after this, the farms were sold and broken up, and residential housing was built on the property. Many of the owners of the newly built homes were Jewish families, and as a result, Willowbrook became the center of the island's Orthodox Jewish community, which from the turn of the 20th century until the late 1960s and early 1970s was primarily centered in Staten Island's North Shore neighborhood of Tompkinsville along with most of Staten Island's then-small Jewish population.

The 2010s saw a great influx to the Jewish community in Willowbrook, because of the housing crisis in Brooklyn.

== Demographics ==
For census purposes, the New York City Department of City Planning classifies Willowbrook as part of a larger Neighborhood Tabulation Area called New Springville-Willowbrook-Bulls Head-Travis SI0204. This designated neighborhood had 42,871 inhabitants based on data from the 2020 United States Census. This was an increase of 3,561 persons (9.1%) from the 39,310 counted in 2010. The neighborhood had a population density of 8.5 inhabitants per acre (14,500/sq mi; 5,600/km^{2}).

The racial makeup of the neighborhood was 59.5% (25,502) White (Non-Hispanic), 3.0% (1,295) Black (Non-Hispanic), 19.6% (8,401) Asian, and 2.6% (1,136) from two or more races. Hispanic or Latino of any race were 15.2% (6,537) of the population.

According to the 2020 United States Census, this area has many cultural communities of over 1,000 inhabitants. This include residents who identify as Mexican, Puerto Rican, Albanian, German, Irish, Italian, Polish, Russian, Egyptian, Korean, and Chinese.

71.0% of the households had at least one family present. Out of the 10,773 households, 51.0% had a married couple (20.7% with a child under 18), 4.4% had a cohabiting couple (1.4% with a child under 18), 16.8% had a single male (1.5% with a child under 18), and 27.9% had a single female (3.9% with a child under 18). 31.8% of households had children. In this neighborhood, 33.4% of non-vacant housing units are renter-occupied.

== Religion ==
Young Israel of Staten Island — an Orthodox synagogue that is the island's largest Jewish house of worship — is located in Willowbrook, as are a number of smaller Orthodox congregations, including Hasidic and Sephardic congregations. Although Willowbrook is home to non-Orthodox Jews as well, there are no non-Orthodox synagogues in the community.

== Education ==
=== School ===
Willowbrook is the location of P.S. 54, an elementary school administered by the New York City Department of Education.

=== Library ===
The New York Public Library (NYPL)'s Todt Hill-Westerleigh branch is located at 2550 Victory Boulevard on the border between Willowbrook and Westerleigh. The three-story branch opened in 1991.

== Transportation ==
Willowbrook is served by the S57, S61, S62, S91, S92 and S93 local buses and the SIM3, SIM4C, SIM31, SIM32, SIM33 and SIM34 express buses.
