= Grasmere, Staten Island =

Neighborhood in New York City

Coordinates: 40°36′18″N 74°05′16″W

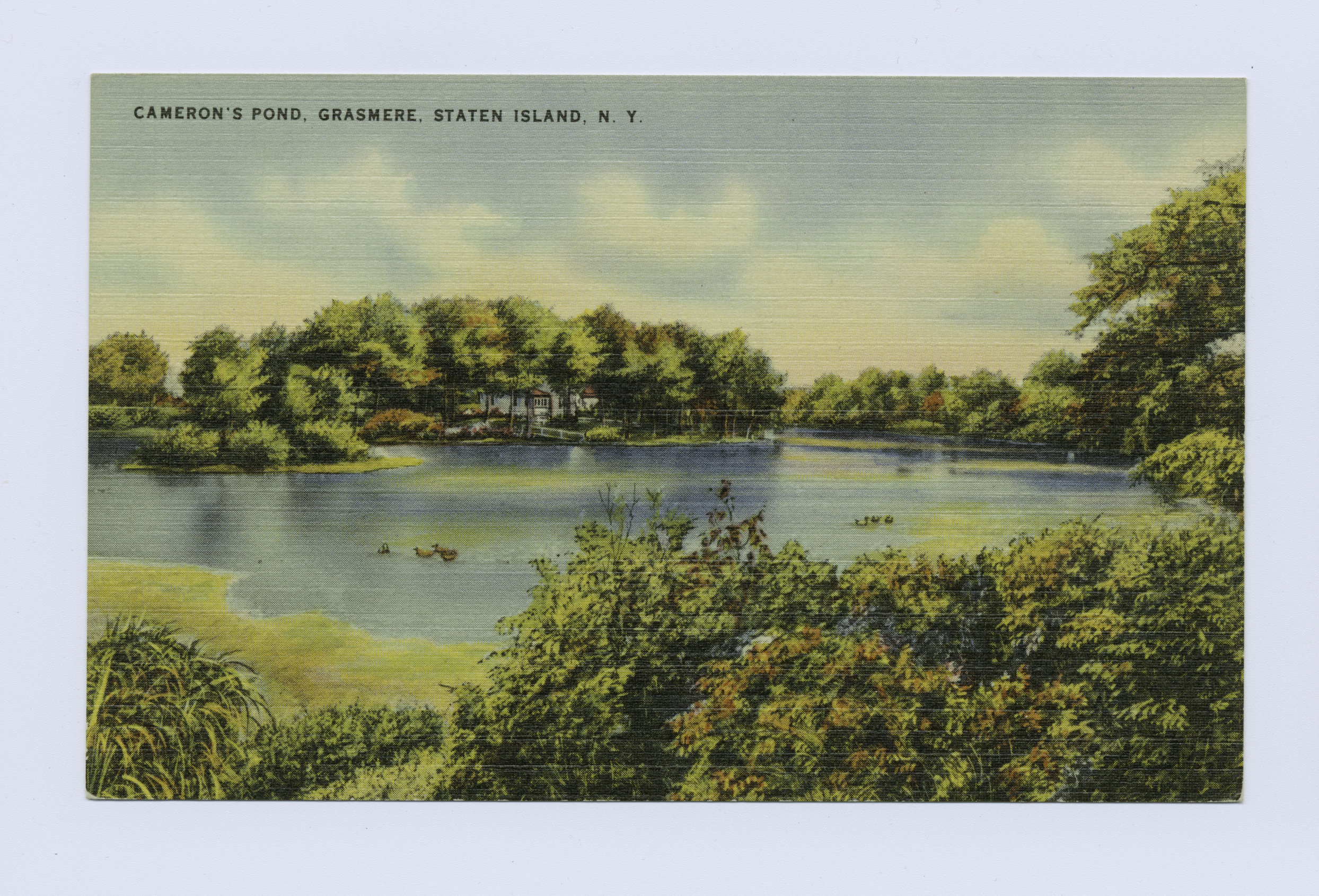
A postcard of Cameron's Pond

Grasmere is a neighborhood located on the East Shore of Staten Island, one of the five boroughs of New York City, New York, United States.

Grasmere although crossed by major roads has retained its quiet suburban character. The area and adjoining Concord was dotted with lakes and ponds similar to the English Lake District village of Grasmere. The name is often attributed to Sir Roderick Cameron, an American resident of Canadian descent who was knighted by Queen Victoria.

The area is also referred to as "Grassmere" [sic] in the official New York State Gazetteer, maintained and published by the New York State Department of Health, which includes numerous defunct hamlets and towns, some with alternate or archaic spellings.

== Demographics ==
For census purposes, the New York City Department of City Planning classifies Grasmere as part of a larger Neighborhood Tabulation Area called Grasmere-Arrochar-South Beach-Dongan Hills SI0201. This designated neighborhood had 36,259 inhabitants based on data from the 2020 United States Census. This was an increase of 1,834 persons (5.3%) from the 34,425 counted in 2010. The neighborhood had a population density of 19.9 inhabitants per acre (14,500/sq mi; 5,600/km^{2}).

The racial makeup of the neighborhood was 57.7% (20,914) White (Non-Hispanic), 5.0% (1,828) Black (Non-Hispanic), 17.9% (6,499) Asian, and 2.7% (979) from two or more races. Hispanic or Latino of any race were 16.7% (6,039) of the population.

According to the 2020 United States Census, this area has many cultural communities of over 1,000 inhabitants. This include residents who identify as Mexican, Puerto Rican, Albanian, German, Irish, Italian, Polish, Russian, African-American, and Chinese.

The largest age group was people 50-64 years old, which made up 22.4% of the residents. 70.0% of the households had at least one family present. Out of the 12,811 households, 46.4% had a married couple (18.2% with a child under 18), 4.4% had a cohabiting couple (1.7% with a child under 18), 19.1% had a single male (1.7% with a child under 18), and 30.1% had a single female (5.3% with a child under 18). 31.6% of households had children under 18. In this neighborhood, 42.8% of non-vacant housing units are renter-occupied.

The entirety of Community District 2, which comprises Grasmere and other Mid-Island neighborhoods, had 134,657 inhabitants as of NYC Health's 2018 Community Health Profile, with an average life expectancy of 81.2 years. This is the same as the median life expectancy of 81.2 for all New York City neighborhoods. Most inhabitants are youth and middle-aged adults: 20% are between the ages of between 0–17, 25% between 25 and 44, and 29% between 45 and 64. The ratio of college-aged and elderly residents was lower, at 8% and 18% respectively.

As of 2017, the median household income in Community District 2 was $81,487, though the median income in South Beach individually was $80,361. In 2018, an estimated 14% of Grasmere and Mid-Island residents lived in poverty, compared to 17% in all of Staten Island and 20% in all of New York City. One in sixteen residents (6%) were unemployed, compared to 6% in Staten Island and 9% in New York City. Rent burden, or the percentage of residents who have difficulty paying their rent, is 52% in South Beach and Mid-Island, compared to the boroughwide and citywide rates of 49% and 51% respectively. Based on this calculation, as of 2018, Grasmere and Mid-Island are considered high-income relative to the rest of the city and not gentrifying.

== Transportation ==
The Staten Island Railway stops in the neighborhood's eponymous station. The distance between Grasmere station and next station north in Clifton is the longest between any two stations on the system.

Grasmere is also served by the S78 and S79 SBS local buses on Hylan Boulevard and the S53 local bus on Clove Road. Express bus service is provided by the SIM1, SIM7 and SIM10 on Hylan Boulevard, the SIM15 on Targee Street (northbound) and Richmond Road (southbound), the SIM3C and SIM35 Narrows Road, and the SIM30 on Tompkins Ave.

== Points of interest ==
950 Fingerboard Road in Grasmere was the location of the executive offices of the Staten Island Advance, the island's daily newspaper. It closed in 2021.

Brady's Pond is a privately owned pond located south of the Staten Island Expressway between the Staten Island Railway and Hylan Boulevard. The pond abuts several houses in Grasmere. It is owned and operated by the Cameron Club of Staten Island, and access to the pond is restricted to members of the club. The neighborhood's only public park, Brady's Pond Preserve, is located at the pond's northwest corner.

== Notable residents ==
- In music, second drummer of Twisted Sister, A. J. Pero grew up on West Fingerboard Road.
- In television, One Day At A Time's Glenn Scarpelli grew up on Normalee Road.
- The mafioso Aniello Dellacroce resided in Grasmere at the time of his death on December 2, 1985.
- Former member of the New York State Assembly, Matthew Mirones, is a Grasmere resident and former President of the Grasmere Civic Association.
- Cassius Marcellus Coolidge, the artist who created the famous Dogs Playing Poker paintings, lived in Grasmere toward the end of his life.
- Sir Roderick Cameron, a 19th-century shipping executive, established a local horse-breeding farm.
- David Carr, Member of the New York City Council from the 50th District, which includes Grasmere.
