= Emerson Hill, Staten Island =

Neighborhood in New York City

Coordinates: 40°36′16″N 74°07′36″W

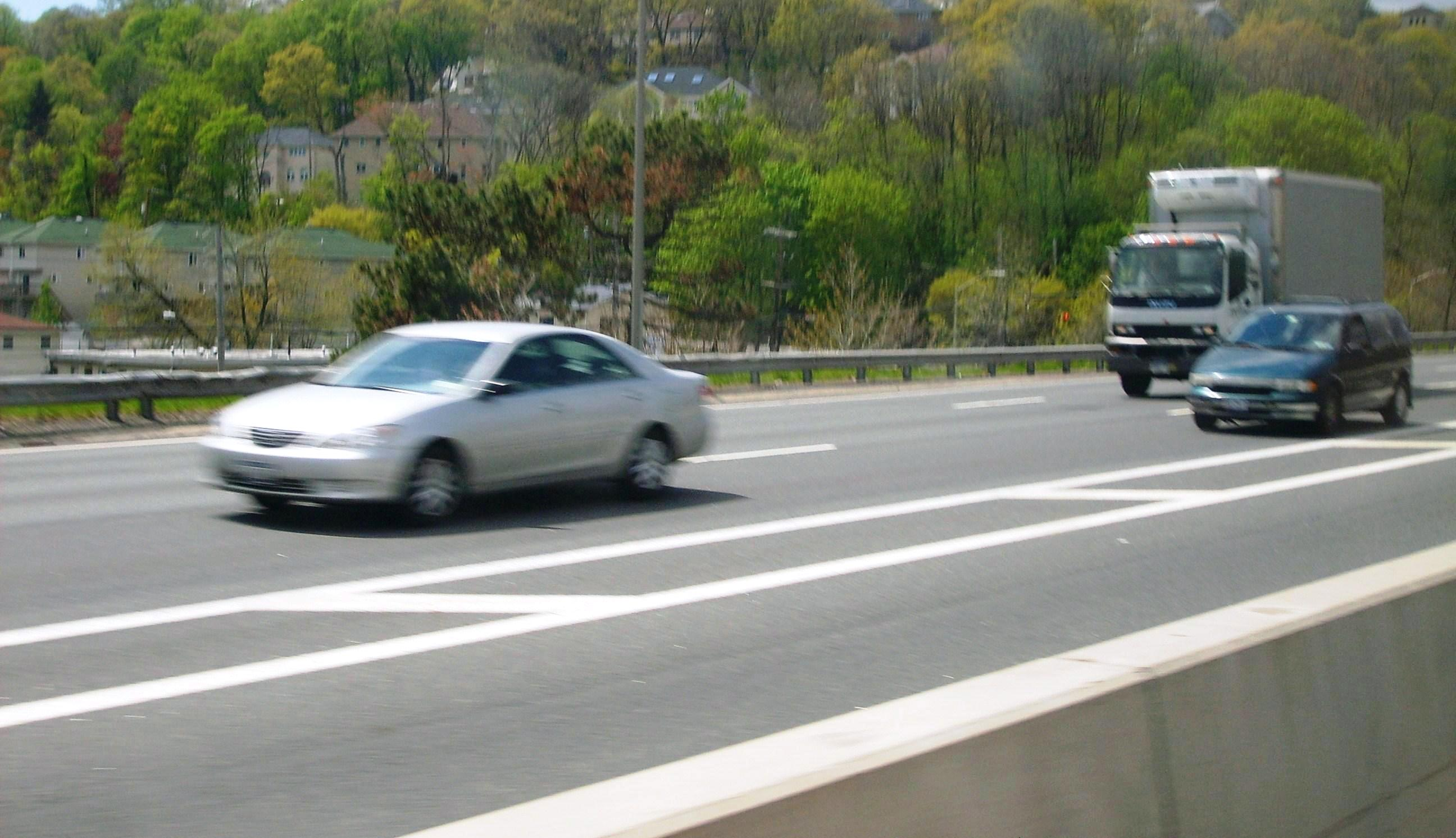
Homes in Emerson Hill along the Staten Island Expressway

Emerson Hill is the name of a hilly area, and the neighborhood situated thereon, in Staten Island, New York, one of the five boroughs of New York City, United States.

Some of the roads on Emerson Hill are private, and several gates were previously found at approaches to the enclave. Signage at the Douglas Road and Emerson Drive entrances to the area restrict truck traffic (except local deliveries) and through traffic. These areas lack gates and are not staffed by security personnel. The streets also lack signage denoting the roads as private. As such, it does not qualify as a gated community. Emerson Hill is separated from its nearby neighborhoods of Grymes Hill just north of the Staten Island Expressway, and Todt Hill — where private roads also exist — borders on the south. The neighborhood is zoned as residential and is part of the Special Natural Area District, which denotes its unique natural characteristics and requires the City Planning Commission to review proposals for site alterations. Removal of trees on private property in the area typically requires approval from the Department of Buildings to ensure compliance with the zoning protocols.

The hill is named for Judge William Emerson — oldest brother of Ralph Waldo Emerson — who lived with his wife, Susan, and children William, Haven and Charles in a long, brown shingle house known as The Snuggery. Willie and Haven were tutored in 1843 by Henry David Thoreau, who lived with the Emersons from May through October. It was the only time in his adult life that Thoreau lived anywhere but Concord, Massachusetts.

In 1971, two large mock Tudor homes at the end of Longfellow Avenue served as Casa Corleone for the filming of Francis Ford Coppola's classic movie The Godfather.

== Demographics ==
For census purposes, the New York City Department of City Planning classifies Emerson Hill as part of a larger Neighborhood Tabulation Area called Todt Hill-Emerson Hill-Lighthouse Hill-Manor Heights SI0203. This designated neighborhood had 32,822 inhabitants based on data from the 2020 United States Census. This was an increase of 1,971 persons (6.4%) from the 30,851 counted in 2010. The neighborhood had a population density of 7.8 inhabitants per acre (14,500/sq mi; 5,600/km^{2}).

The racial makeup of the neighborhood was 62.8% (20,597) White (Non-Hispanic), 4.1% (1,348) Black (Non-Hispanic), 19.8% (6,486) Asian, and 3% (971) from two or more races. Hispanic or Latino of any race were 10.4% (3,420) of the population.

According to the 2020 United States Census, this area has many cultural communities of over 1,000 inhabitants. This include residents who identify as Puerto Rican, German, Irish, Italian, Indian, and Chinese.

The largest age group was people 55-74 years old, which made up 24.9% of the residents. 75.1% of the households had at least one family present. Out of the 10,623 households, 57.1% had a married couple (22.4% with a child under 18), 3.1% had a cohabiting couple (1.2% with a child under 18), 14.3% had a single male (1.6% with a child under 18), and 25.4% had a single female (3.9% with a child under 18). 32.7% of households had children under 18. In this neighborhood, 30.3% of non-vacant housing units are renter-occupied.
