= New York City's 49th City Council district =

- Boundaries following the 2020 census

Government
  - Councilmember: . Kamillah Hanks. D–Stapleton

Population (2010)
  - Total: 170,363

Demographics
  - White: 38%
  - Hispanic: 29%
  - Black: 23%
  - Asian: 8%
  - Other: 3%

Registration
  - Democratic: 59.0%
  - Republican: 15.4%
  - No party preference: 20.9%
- Registered voters (2021) 109,147

New York City's 49th City Council district is one of 51 districts in the New York City Council. It has been represented by Democrat Kamillah Hanks since 2022. Hanks succeeded former councilwoman Debi Rose, who was term limited in 2021.

== Geography ==
District 49 covers nearly the entire North Shore of Staten Island, including the neighborhoods of Stapleton, West New Brighton, Port Richmond, Sunnyside, St. George, Mariners Harbor, New Brighton, Clifton, Arlington, Graniteville, Livingston, Tompkinsville, Randall Manor, Silver Lake, and parts of Concord and Rosebank. Clove Lakes Park, Sailors' Snug Harbor, and the Staten Island Zoo are also located within the district.

The district overlaps with Staten Island Community Boards 1 and 2, and is contained entirely within New York's 11th congressional district. It also overlaps with the 23rd and 24th districts of the New York State Senate, and with the 61st, 63rd, and 64th districts of the New York State Assembly.

The district is both the most Democratic and the most diverse City Council district on Staten Island, and it is the only one to currently be represented by a Democrat. When Debi Rose was elected in 2009, she was the first African American to ever hold higher office on the island.

== Members representing the district ==
| Members | Party | Years served | Electoral history |
|---|---|---|---|
District established January 1, 1992
| Jerome X. O'Donovan (Dongan Hills) | Democratic | January 1, 1992 – December 31, 2001 | Redistricted from the 35th district and re-elected in 1991. Re-elected in 1993. Re-elected in 1997. Retired to run for Borough President of Staten Island. |
| Michael McMahon (Stapleton) | Democratic | January 1, 2002 – December 31, 2008 | Elected in 2001. Re-elected in 2003. Re-elected in 2005. Resigned after being elected to the U.S. House of Representatives. |
| Vacant | | December 31, 2008 – March 19, 2009 | |
| Kenneth Mitchell (Stapleton) | Democratic | March 19, 2009 – December 31, 2009 | Elected to finish McMahon's term. Lost renomination and lost re-election as a Conservative. |
| Debi Rose (Arlington) | Democratic | January 1, 2010 – December 31, 2021 | Elected in 2009. Re-elected in 2013. Re-elected in 2017. Termed out. |
| Kamillah Hanks (Stapleton) | Democratic | January 1, 2022 – | Elected in 2021. Re-elected in 2023. Re-elected in 2025. |

== Recent election results ==
=== 2025 ===
The 2025 New York City Council elections will be held on November 4, 2025, with primary elections occurring on June 24, 2025.

2025 New York City Council election, District 49
Primary election
| Party | Candidate | Votes | % |
|---|---|---|---|
| Democratic | Kamillah Hanks (incumbent) | 7,174 | 58.1 |
| Democratic | Abou Diakhate | 1,979 | 16.0 |
| Democratic | Sarah Blas | 1,902 | 15.4 |
| Democratic | Telee Brown | 1,100 | 8.9 |
| Write-in | | 193 | 1.6 |
| Total votes | | 12,348 | 100.0 |
General election
| Democratic | Kamillah Hanks (incumbent) | 20,263 | 55.2 |
| Republican | John Shea | 12,490 | 34.1 |
| Working Families | Sarah Blas | 3,310 | |
| New North Shore | Sarah Blas | 528 | |
| Total | Sarah Blas | 3,838 | 10.5 |
| Write-in | | 90 | 0.2 |
| Total votes | | 36,681 | 100.0 |
| Democratic hold | | | |

=== 2023 (redistricting) ===
Due to redistricting and the 2020 changes to the New York City Charter, councilmembers elected during the 2021 and 2023 City Council elections will serve two-year terms, with full four-year terms resuming after the 2025 New York City Council elections.

2023 New York City Council election, District 49
| Party | Candidate | Votes | % |
|---|---|---|---|
| Democratic | Kamillah Hanks (incumbent) | 6,859 | 79.2 |
| Safe Streets SI | Ruslan Shamal | 1,418 | 16.4 |
| Write-in | | 380 | 4.4 |
| Total votes | | 8,657 | 100.0 |
| Democratic hold | | | |

=== 2021 ===
In 2019, voters in New York City approved Ballot Question 1, which implemented ranked-choice voting in all local elections. Under the new system, voters have the option to rank up to five candidates for every local office. Voters whose first-choice candidates fare poorly will have their votes redistributed to other candidates in their ranking until one candidate surpasses the 50 percent threshold. If one candidate surpasses 50 percent in first-choice votes, then ranked-choice tabulations will not occur.

2021 New York City Council election, District 49 Democratic primary
| Party | Candidate | Maximum round | Maximum votes | Share in maximum round | Maximum votes First round votes Transfer votes |
|---|---|---|---|---|---|
| Democratic | Kamillah Hanks | 9 | 5,996 | 56.9% | |
| Democratic | Amoy Barnes | 9 | 4,536 | 43.1% | |
| Democratic | Ranti Ogunleye | 8 | 2,329 | 20.4% | |
| Democratic | Kelvin Richards | 7 | 1,929 | 15.8% | |
| Democratic | Selina Grey | 6 | 1,657 | 13.1% | |
| Democratic | David Hernandez | 5 | 1,190 | 9.1% | |
| Democratic | Mike Schnall | 4 | 1,014 | 7.6% | |
| Democratic | Troy McGhie | 3 | 869 | 6.4% | |
| Democratic | John McBeth | 2 | 394 | 2.9% | |
| Write-in | | 1 | 53 | 0.4% | |

An interactive map of District 49

2021 New York City Council election, District 49 general election
| Party | Candidate | Votes | % |
|---|---|---|---|
| Democratic | Kamillah Hanks | 15,203 | 58.6 |
| Republican | Patricia Rondinelli | 10,081 | 38.8 |
| Ordinary People | Jason Price | 605 | 2.3 |
| Write-in | | 76 | 0.3 |
| Total votes | | 25,965 | 100 |
| Democratic hold | | | |

=== 2017 ===
2017 New York City Council election, District 49
Primary election
| Party | Candidate | Votes | % |
|---|---|---|---|
| Democratic | Debi Rose (incumbent) | 5,895 | 69.4 |
| Democratic | Kamillah Hanks | 2,558 | 30.1 |
| Write-in | | 41 | 0.5 |
| Total votes | | 8,494 | 100 |
General election
| Democratic | Debi Rose | 14,714 | |
| Working Families | Debi Rose | 1,038 | |
| Total | Debi Rose (incumbent) | 15,752 | 59.2 |
| Republican | Mike Penrose | 7,726 | |
| Conservative | Mike Penrose | 1,717 | |
| Total | Mike Penrose | 9,443 | 35.5 |
| Reform | Kamillah Hanks | 1,377 | 5.2 |
| Write-in | | 39 | 0.1 |
| Total votes | | 26,611 | 100 |
| Democratic hold | | | |

=== 2013 ===
2013 New York City Council election, District 49
| Party | Candidate | Votes | % |
|---|---|---|---|
| Democratic | Debi Rose | 14,462 | |
| Working Families | Debi Rose | 1,099 | |
| Total | Debi Rose (incumbent) | 15,561 | 69.6 |
| Republican | Mark Macron | 5,515 | |
| Conservative | Mark Macron | 1,250 | |
| Total | Mark Macron | 6,765 | 30.3 |
| Write-in | | 28 | 0.1 |
| Total votes | | 22,354 | 100 |
| Democratic hold | | | |
