= Kenneth Mitchell (politician) =

American politician (born 1965)

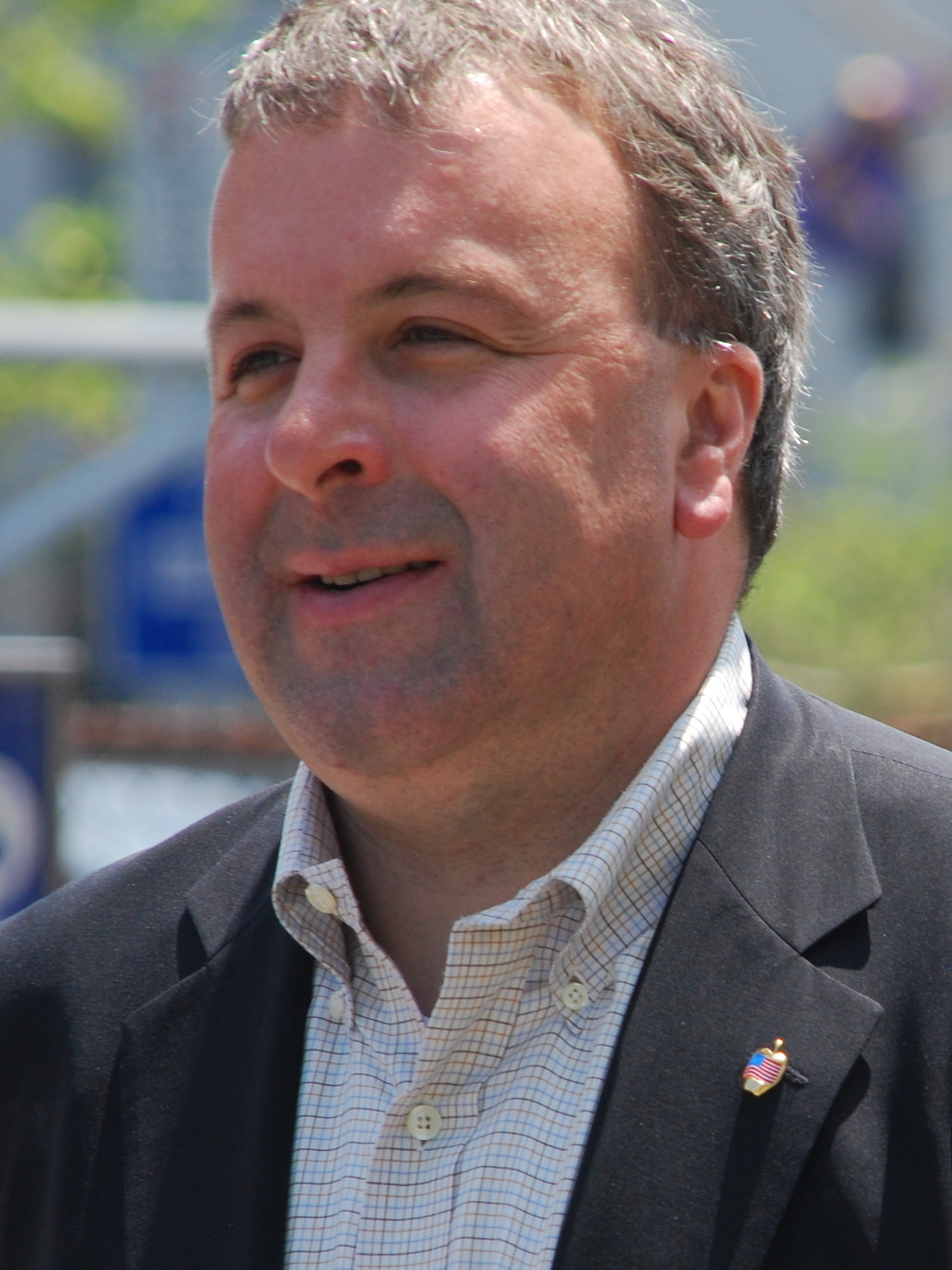
- Mitchell in 2009

Member of the New York City Council from the 49th district
- In office March 2009 – December 31, 2009
- Preceded by: Michael E. McMahon
- Succeeded by: Deborah Rose

Personal details
- Born: October 23, 1965 (age 60) Staten Island, New York, U.S.
- Party: Democratic
- Education: Wagner College (BA); New York Law School (JD)
- Profession: Politician

Kenneth C. "Ken" Mitchell is a Democratic Party politician from the New York City borough of Staten Island who had served in the New York City Council representing the North Shore of that borough. He is currently the executive director of the Staten Island Zoo. From March 1, 2010, to October 3, 2011, Mitchell served as interim executive director of the institution.

== Early life and education ==
A third generation Staten Islander, Mitchell attended P.S. 45 and the Blessed Sacrament School and St. Peter's Boys High School. He is a graduate of Wagner College and New York Law School and is licensed to practice law in New York and New Jersey.

== Career ==
At age 22, Mitchell recognized overdevelopment in Staten Island to be a problem and worked to rezone his neighborhood of Barrett Park to prevent such unnecessary expansion. He began his legal career as a law clerk for New York State Supreme Court Justice Michael J. Brennan and was then a Court Attorney for the New York City Criminal Court in Staten Island.

Mitchell served as chief of staff and General Counsel to former councilman (later Congressman) Mike McMahon for seven years.

Mitchell was elected to the New York City Council in a special election in February 2009 and represented the North Shore of Staten Island. He was defeated in his bid for re-election during the September 2009 Democratic primary by a community activist, Debi Rose. He then appeared on the ballot in the general election on November 3, 2009, as a candidate for the Conservative Party of New York. Rose beat him in the New York City general election and thus succeeded him in January 2010.

== Affiliations and personal life ==
Prior to being elected to the New York City Council, Mitchell had also worked with and served on the boards of many local charities and community groups including the Dr. Theodore A. Atlas Foundation (named after the physician father of boxer Teddy Atlas), The Staten Island Zoological Society, The Children's Aid Society at Goodhue Center and the Staten Island Film Festival. He has received service awards from United Activities Unlimited, Warren Jacques Memorial Committee and the North Shore Democratic Club. Mitchell was inducted as a member into the Sons of American Legion, Livingston Post 1369.

Political offices
Preceded by Michael E. McMahon	New York City Council, 49th district 2009	Succeeded by Debi Rose
Business positions
Preceded by John Caltabiano	Executive Director of the Staten Island Zoo; 2010-Present	Succeeded by Incumbent
