= Debi Rose =

American politician

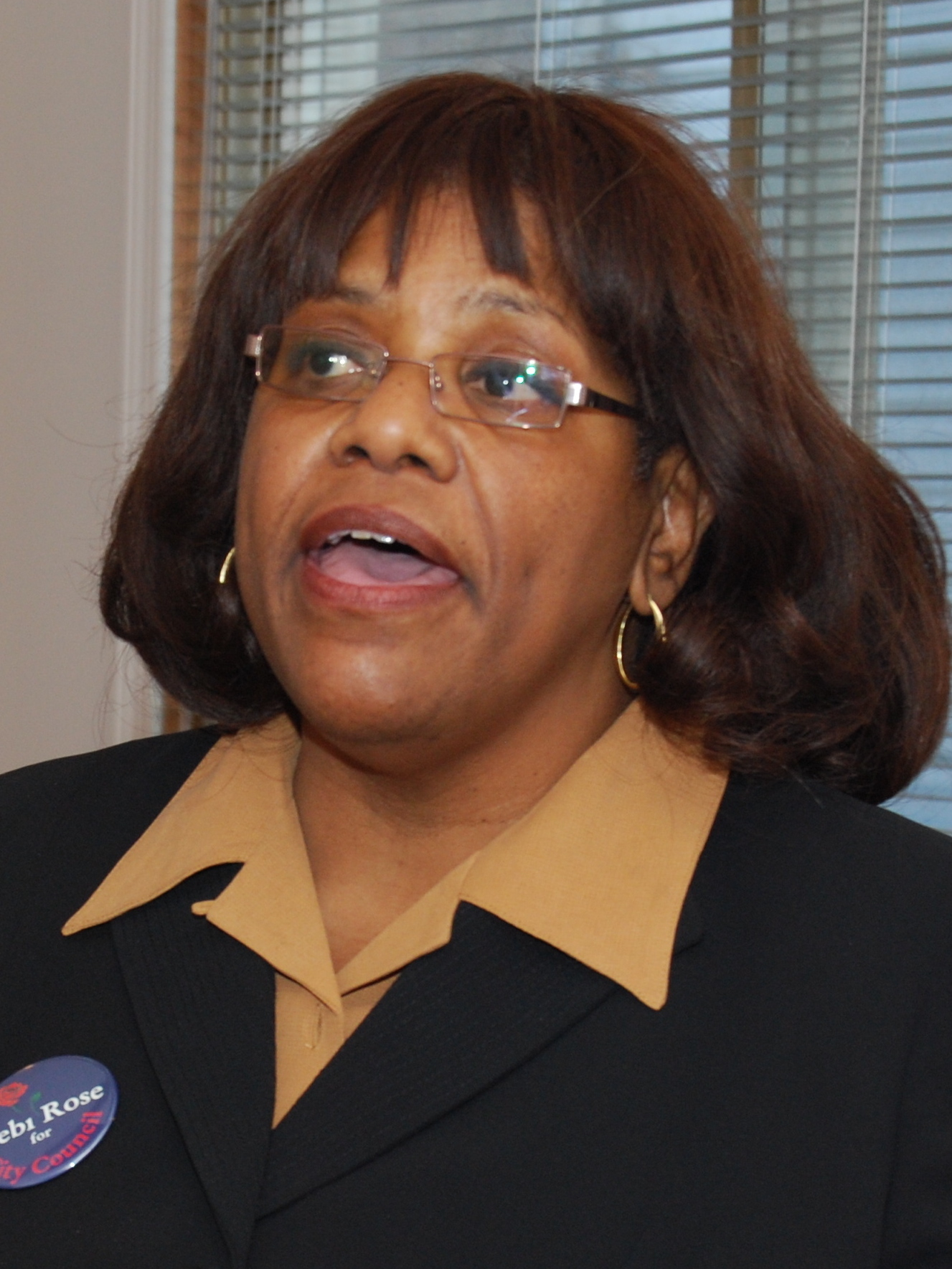

Member of the New York City Council from the 49th District
- In office January 1, 2010 – December 31, 2021
- Preceded by: Kenneth Mitchell
- Succeeded by: Kamillah Hanks

Personal details
- Born: August 21, 1951 (age 75)
- Party: Democratic
- Education: Hofstra University (BA)
- Website: Campaign website Official website

Deborah Rose (born August 21, 1951) is a New York City politician. She was the Council member for the 49th district of the New York City Council. She is a Democrat and was the first African American elected to higher office from Staten Island.

The district includes the neighborhoods of Arlington, Bloomfield, Bull's Head, Castleton Corners, Clifton, Concord, Emerson Hill, Fort Wadsworth, Graniteville, Grymes Hill, Howland Hook, Mariners Harbor, New Brighton, Park Hill, Port Ivory, Port Richmond, Randall Manor, Rosebank, Shore Acres, Silver Lake, St. George, Stapleton, Todt Hill, Tompkinsville, West Brighton, Westerleigh and Willowbrook on Staten Island.

== Life and career ==
Rose, a native Staten Islander, was born on August 21, 1951, and grew up in the West New Brighton neighborhood on the North Shore of Staten Island. One of three children, her parents were the late Louis Carrington, a descendant of Sandy Ground settlers, and the late Muriel Billups, a founder of the Staten Island chapter of the National Council of Negro Women. Her maternal grandparents owned one of two black-owned funeral homes on Staten Island, and were community leaders.

She is a graduate of Port Richmond High School, where she was a member of the Staten Island's NAACP youth group and the Vice President of her senior class. She is also a graduate of Hofstra University. She currently resides in Arlington, Staten Island.

Prior to running for the city council seat, she spent several years advocating on school funding issues and health issues. She was elected in 1996 to the now-defunct New York City Board of Education. She has been a member of the Staten Island Mental Health Society and the American Cancer Society - Women's Breast Partnership. She established the Staten Island Black Women's Health Initiative.

== New York City Council ==
In the September 2009 Democratic primary, Rose defeated incumbent Kenneth Mitchell by 16 percentage points. She defeated Mitchell (Conservative Party of New York) and Timothy Kuhn (Republican Party) by a wide margin in the November 2009 general election. She easily was re-elected in 2013. Rose currently serves as the chairperson of the New York City Council Committee on Civil Rights.

Rose was the subject of a lawsuit filed by five Staten Island voters. The voters alleged that Rose was underbilled for services provided by Data and Field Services, a political company created by the Working Families Party. DFS provides services such as phone banking, polling and get-out-the-vote efforts. Rose should have paid DFS $100,000, but the lawsuit alleged that her campaign was underbilled because she was endorsed by the Working Families Party, a violation of election laws. Rose's campaign settled by paying DFS $8,525, and did not have to acknowledge any wrongdoing on the behalf of her campaign or DFS.

Election history
Location	Year	Election	Results
NYC Council District 49	2001	Democratic	√ Michael McMahon 38.90% Debi Rose 37.56% Jon R. Del Giorno 23.54%
NYC Council District 49	2001	General	√ Michael McMahon (D) 50.11% Joseph Cammarata (R) 34.36% Debi Rose (Liberal) 15.14% Susan Roecker (Green) .39%
NYC Council District 49	2009	Special	√ Kenneth Mitchell (D) 40.27% Debi Rose (D) 37.21% Tony Baker (D) 7.57% John Tabacco (I) 6.80% Paul Saryian (I) 5.05% Don Pagano (D) 3.12%
NYC Council District 49	2009	Democratic	√ Debi Rose 54.48% Kenneth Mitchell 39.63% Rajiv Gowda 5.89%
NYC Council District 49	2009	General	√ Debi Rose (D) 57.99% Kenneth Mitchell (Conservative) 25.94% Timothy K. Kuhn (R) 16.06%
NYC Council District 49	2013	General	√ Debi Rose (D) 69.61% Mark Macron (R) 30.26%
NYC Council District 34	2017	Democratic Primary	√ Debi Rose 69.39% Kamillah Hanks 30.11%
NYC Council District 34	2017	General	√ Debi Rose (D) 59.19% Mike Penrose (R) 35.48% Kamillah Hanks (Reform) 5.17%

Political offices
Preceded by Kenneth Mitchell	New York City Council, 49th district 2010–2022	Succeeded by Kamillah Hanks
