= Michael McMahon =

American politician (born 1957)

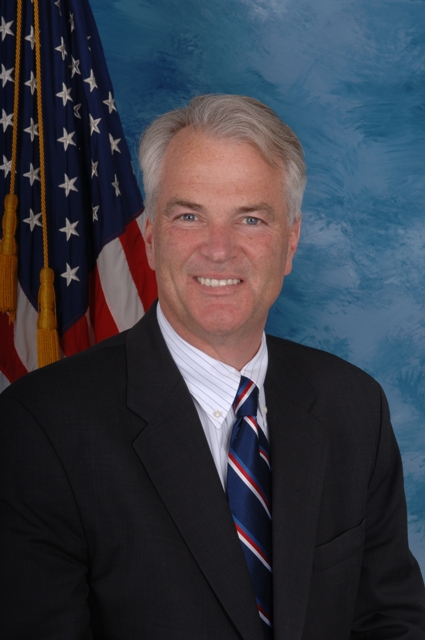

District Attorney of Richmond County
- Incumbent
- Assumed office January 1, 2016
- Chief Assistant: Ashleigh J. Owens (2024-present)
- Preceded by: Daniel Master (acting)

Member of the U.S. House of Representatives from New York's 13th district
- In office January 3, 2009 – January 3, 2011
- Preceded by: Vito Fossella
- Succeeded by: Michael Grimm

Member of the New York City Council from the 49th district
- In office January 1, 2002 – December 31, 2008
- Preceded by: Jerome X. O'Donovan
- Succeeded by: Kenneth Mitchell

Personal details
- Born: September 12, 1957 (age 68) New York City, New York, U.S.
- Party: Democratic
- Spouse: Judith Novellino
- Children: 2
- Education: New York University (BA); New York Law School (JD)

Michael E. McMahon (born September 12, 1957) is an American politician and attorney serving as the district attorney for Richmond County, which is coextensive with Staten Island. A member of the Democratic Party, McMahon is a former U.S. representative for New York's 13th congressional district, serving from 2009 until 2011, and a former member of the New York City Council.

== Early life, education and career ==
McMahon is a lifelong resident of Staten Island. He is of German and Irish descent. He grew up in the Stapleton neighborhood on the North Shore and attended parochial schools. He graduated from New York University in 1979, later obtaining a J.D. degree from New York Law School. He then worked for Democratic State Assembly members Eric Vitaliano and Elizabeth Connelly. He joined the staff of City Councilman Jerome X. O'Donovan, whom he succeeded in the Council. Prior to being elected to public office, McMahon worked as a partner at O'Leary, McMahon & Spero law firm in Staten Island. Since 1981 he is member of the student Corps Saxo-Borussia Heidelberg.

== New York City Council ==
McMahon served as the Chair of the New York City Council's Sanitation & Solid Waste Management Committee focusing on minimizing the use of trucks to transport garbage and also more evenly distributing the load of waste processing across the five boroughs.

== U.S. House of Representatives ==
=== Committee assignments ===
- Committee on Foreign Affairs
  - Subcommittee on Europe
  - Subcommittee on Terrorism, Nonproliferation, and Trade
  - Subcommittee on the Middle East and South Asia
- Committee on Transportation and Infrastructure
  - Subcommittee on Aviation
  - Subcommittee on Coast Guard and Maritime Transportation
  - Subcommittee on Railroads, Pipelines, and Hazardous Materials

== Political positions ==
In November 2009, McMahon voted along with 38 other Democrats against the Affordable Health Care for America Act and against the Patient Protection and Affordable Care Act in March 2010. He was the only member of the New York City delegation to do so, and was only one of two New York Democrats, the other being Michael Arcuri, to vote against it.

== Political campaigns ==
=== 2008 ===
On May 28, 2008, the Staten Island Democratic Committee endorsed McMahon to run for the Congressional seat in New York's 13th congressional district being vacated by retiring 12-year incumbent Republican Vito Fossella. On September 9, 2008 McMahon defeated opponent Steve Harrison in the Democratic Party primary with 75% of votes to Harrison's 25%. Earlier, on June 11, 2008, McMahon had been endorsed by the city's 12 Democratic congressmen.

The 13th had long been considered to be the most conservative district of the 13 that divided New York City. It was based in Staten Island, which is the base of the city's Republican Party. Although Democrats have a 17-point edge in registration, its voters are somewhat conservative on social issues and matters regarding "law and order", which kept Republicans in the seat for over a quarter century. However, the Republicans had considerable difficulty finding a replacement for Fossella on the ballot, eventually settling on former state assemblyman Robert Straniere. As a result, nearly all major pundits believed McMahon was almost certain to win the seat.

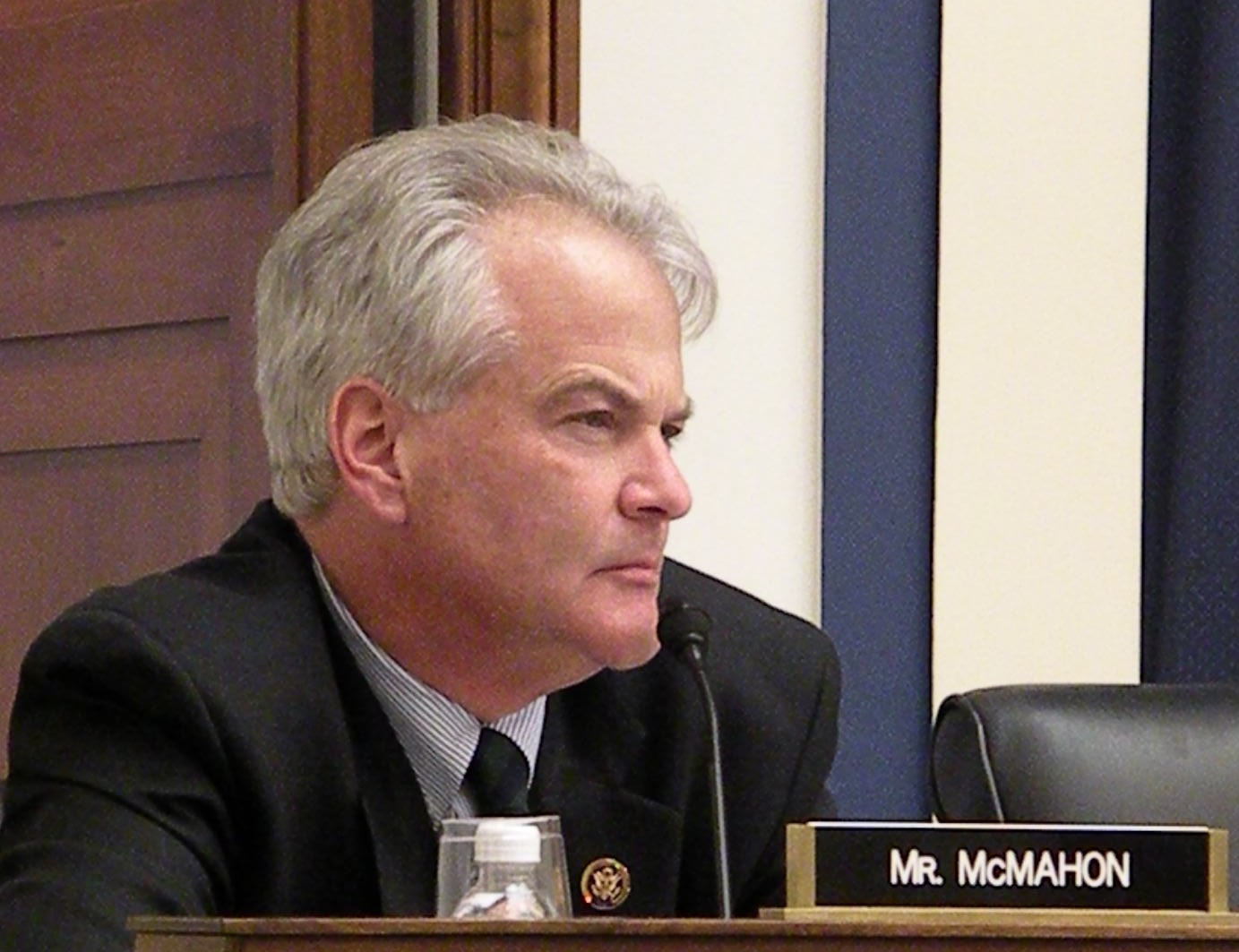
Congressman McMahon attending a Coast Guard Hearing for the House Transportation Committee on February 4, 2009

In the November election, McMahon won in a landslide, taking 61 percent of the vote to Straniere's 33 percent. With his victory, New York City's congressional delegation became entirely Democratic for the first time in 76 years. This occurred despite the fact that John McCain narrowly carried Staten Island in the presidential election; a Democratic presidential candidate has carried Staten Island only four times since 1936.

=== 2010 ===
McMahon was challenged by Republican and Conservative Party nominee Michael Grimm, a former FBI Special Agent, and Libertarian nominee Tom Vendittelli. Grimm won the election, defeating McMahon. He was one of a number of freshman Democrats who lost reelection in the GOP landslide of 2010. In all, Democrats lost 63 seats in the 2010 Republican landslide.

=== 2015 ===
McMahon had publicly expressed a "serious interest" for retaking his old seat, now numbered as the 11th District, in the 2015 special election to replace his successor Michael Grimm. Grimm, who defeated McMahon for reelection in 2010, announced his plans to resign in January after pleading guilty to a felony tax evasion charge on December 23, 2014. McMahon, however, declined to run, deciding to enter the race for Staten Island (Richmond County) District Attorney, and the Democratic nomination went to New York City Councilman Vincent J. Gentile, who was from the Brooklyn portion of the district.

== Richmond County District Attorney ==
In November, McMahon defeated Republican candidate Joan Illuzzi for Staten Island District Attorney. In April 2024, following the resignation of former Erie County District Attorney John Flynn, McMahon was sworn in as President of the District Attorneys Association of the State of New York.

== Electoral history ==
=== 2023 ===
2023 Richmond County District Attorney election
Party	Candidate	Votes	%
Democratic	Michael McMahon (incumbent)	20,328	93.5
Write-in		1,417	6.5
Total votes		21,745	100.0
Democratic hold			

=== 2019 ===
2019 Richmond County District Attorney election
Party	Candidate	Votes	%
Democratic	Michael McMahon (incumbent)	33,447	78.1
Independence	Michael McMahon (incumbent)	8,525	19.9
Total	Michael McMahon (incumbent)	41,972	98.0
Write-in		838	2.0
Total votes		42,810	100.0
Democratic hold			

=== 2015 ===
2015 Richmond County District Attorney Conservative primary
Party	Candidate	Votes	%
Conservative	Joan Illuzzi (write-in)	530	54.9
Conservative	Michael McMahon	430	44.6
Write-in		5	0.5
Total votes		965	100.0

2015 Richmond County District Attorney election
Party	Candidate	Votes	%
Democratic	Michael McMahon	20,368	48.6
Independence	Michael McMahon	2,579	6.2
Total	Michael McMahon	22,947	54.8
Republican	Joan Illuzzi	14,181	33.8
Conservative	Joan Illuzzi	4,287	10.2
Reform	Joan Illuzzi	409	1.0
Total	Joan Illuzzi	18,877	45.0
Write-in		83	0.2
Total votes		41,907	100.0
Democratic gain from Republican			

=== 2010 ===
2010 United States House of Representatives election in New York, District 13
Party	Candidate	Votes	%
Republican	Michael Grimm	55,822	44.0
Conservative	Michael Grimm	9,204	7.3
Total	Michael Grimm	65,026	51.3
Democratic	Michael McMahon (incumbent)	56,412	44.5
Independence	Michael McMahon (incumbent)	4,361	3.4
Total	Michael McMahon (incumbent)	60,773	47.9
Libertarian	Tom Vendittelli	929	0.7
Write-in		72	0.1
Total votes		126,800	100.0
Republican gain from Democratic			

=== 2008 ===
2008 United States House of Representatives Democratic primary in New York, District 13
Party	Candidate	Votes	%
Democratic	Michael McMahon	12,805	75.7
Democratic	Stephen A. Harrison	3,992	23.6
Write-in		128	0.8
Total votes		16,925	100.0

2008 United States House of Representatives election in New York, District 13
Party	Candidate	Votes	%
Democratic	Michael McMahon	107,640	57.4
Working Families	Michael McMahon	6,579	3.5
Total	Michael McMahon	114,219	60.9
Republican	Robert A. Straniere	62,441	33.3
Conservative	Timothy J. Cochrane	5,799	3.1
Independence	Carmine A. Morano	4,947	2.6
Write-in		40	0.0
Total votes		187,446	100.0
Democratic gain from Republican			

=== 2005 ===
2005 New York City Council election, District 49
Party	Candidate	Votes	%
Democratic	Michael McMahon (incumbent)	15,762	62.8
Conservative	Michael McMahon (incumbent)	1,248	5.0
Working Families	Michael McMahon (incumbent)	751	3.0
Total	Michael McMahon (incumbent)	17,761	70.8
Republican	Jody Hall	7,333	29.2
Write-in		2	0.0
Total votes		25,096	100.0
Democratic hold			

=== 2003 ===
2003 New York City Council election, District 49
Party	Candidate	Votes	%
Democratic	Michael McMahon (incumbent)	10,035	62.2
Conservative	Michael McMahon (incumbent)	1,097	6.8
Total	Michael McMahon (incumbent)	11,132	69.0
Republican	Lisa Giovinazzo	4,607	28.6
Independence	John Johnson	390	2.4
Write-in		1	0.0
Total votes		16,130	100.0
Democratic hold			

=== 2001 ===
2001 New York City Council Democratic primary, District 49
Party	Candidate	Votes	%
Democratic	Michael McMahon	4,937	38.9
Democratic	Debi Rose	4,767	37.6
Democratic	Jon R. Del Giorno	2,987	23.5
Write-in		1	0.0
Total votes		12,692	100.0

2001 New York City Council election, District 49
Party	Candidate	Votes	%
Democratic	Michael McMahon	14,877	46.9
Working Families	Michael McMahon	1,005	3.2
Total	Michael McMahon	15,882	50.1
Republican	Joseph F. Cammarata	9,607	30.3
Conservative	Joseph F. Cammarata	875	2.8
Right to Life	Joseph F. Cammarata	408	1.3
Total	Joseph F. Cammarata	10,890	34.4
Liberal	Debi Rose	4,798	15.1
Green	Susan K. Roecker	123	0.4
Total votes		31,693	100.0
Democratic hold			

U.S. House of Representatives
Preceded by Vito Fossella	Member of the U.S. House of Representatives from New York's 13th congressional district 2009–2011	Succeeded by Michael Grimm
Legal offices
Preceded by Daniel Master; Acting	District Attorney of Richmond County; 2016–present	Incumbent
U.S. order of precedence (ceremonial)
Preceded by Chris Lee as Former U.S. Representative	Order of precedence of the United States as Former U.S. Representative	Succeeded by Ann Marie Buerkle as Former U.S. Representative
