= 2023 Richmond County District Attorney election =

Richmond County District Attorney election, 2023
- November 7, 2023
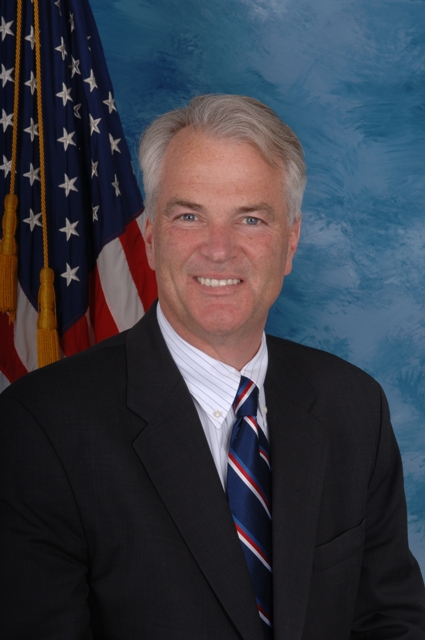
Candidate	Michael McMahon
Party	Democratic
Popular vote	20,328
Percentage	93.5%
- McMahon: 80–90% 90–100%
District Attorney before election
Michael McMahon
Democratic
Elected District Attorney
Michael McMahon
Democratic

The 2023 Richmond County District Attorney election was held on November 7, 2023, to elect the Richmond County District Attorney. The incumbent, Michael McMahon, ran for a third term.

As the Republicans did not field a candidate, he was the only candidate to file before the deadline and was therefore unopposed in the Democratic primary election and only faced write-in opposition in the general election.

McMahon was re-elected with 93.5% of the vote, with the remaining votes being write-ins.

== Democratic primary ==
The Democratic primary election was canceled, as Michael Mossa was the only candidate contesting the nomination.

=== Candidates ===
==== Nominee ====
- Michael McMahon, incumbent District Attorney

== General election ==
=== Results ===
Queens County district attorney, 2019
Party	Candidate	Votes	%
Democratic	Michael McMahon	20,328	93.48%
Write-in		1,417	6.52%
Total votes		21,745	100.0%
Democratic hold			
