= 2008 United States House of Representatives elections in New York =

- November 4, 2008

All 29 New York seats to the United States House of Representatives elections
	Majority party	Minority party
Party	Democratic	Republican
Last election	23	6
Seats before	23	6
Seats won	26	3
Seat change	▲3	▼3
Popular vote	4,286,047	2,043,162
Percentage	67.07%	31.97%

Democratic hold Democratic gain
Republican hold
Democratic
50–60%
60–70%
70–80%
80–90%
90–100%
Republican
50–60%
60–70%

The 2008 United States House of Representatives elections in New York were held on November 4, 2008, to elect the 29 U.S. representatives from the State of New York, one from each of the state's 29 congressional districts. state of New York in the United States House of Representatives. New York has 29 seats in the House, apportioned according to the 2000 United States census. Representatives are elected for two-year terms; those elected will serve in the 111th Congress from January 4, 2009, until January 3, 2011. The election coincided with the 2008 U.S. presidential election in which Democrat Barack Obama defeated Republican John McCain by a wide margin.

The districts with congressional races not forecast as "safe" for the incumbent party were New York's congressional districts 13, 19, 20, 24, 25, 26 and 29.

The Democratic Party gained three seats in New York's congressional delegation in the 2008 elections. In New York's 13th congressional district, Democrat Michael McMahon defeated Robert Straniere to win the seat vacated by Republican Rep. Vito Fossella. In New York's 25th congressional district, Democrat Dan Maffei defeated Republican Dale Sweetland to win the seat vacated by Republican Rep. Jim Walsh. In New York's 29th congressional district, Democrat Eric Massa defeated incumbent Republican Rep. Randy Kuhl. Beginning in 2009, New York's congressional delegation consisted of a lopsided 26 Democrats and 3 Republicans. In the history of New York state politics, this represents the best performance by any one party, as a proportion of total seats, in state history. Republicans suffered in the fallout of the financial crisis, but regained seats in the following elections.

== Overview ==
=== Votes by district ===
Candidates on multiple ballot lines are marked as the party they caucus with.

District	Democratic		Republican		Others		Total	Result
District	Votes	%	Votes	%	Votes	%	Votes	Result
District 1	162,083	58.38%	115,545	41.62%	0	0.00%	277,628	Democratic Hold
District 2	161,279	66.94%	79,641	33.06%	0	0.00%	240,920	Democratic Hold
District 3	97,525	36.08%	172,774	63.92%	0	0.00%	270,299	Republican Hold
District 4	164,028	64.01%	92,242	35.99%	0	0.00%	256,270	Democratic Hold
District 5	112,724	71.00%	43,039	27.11%	3,010	1.90%	158,773	Democratic Hold
District 6	141,180	100.00%	0	0.00%	0	0.00%	141,180	Democratic Hold
District 7	118,459	84.65%	21,477	15.35%	0	0.00%	139,936	Democratic Hold
District 8	160,775	80.45%	39,062	19.55%	0	0.00%	199,837	Democratic Hold
District 9	112,205	93.05%	8,378	6.95%	0	0.00%	120,583	Democratic Hold
District 10	155,090	94.19%	9,565	5.81%	0	0.00%	164,655	Democratic Hold
District 11	168,562	92.76%	11,644	6.41%	1,517	0.83%	181,723	Democratic Hold
District 12	123,053	89.95%	13,748	10.05%	0	0.00%	136,801	Democratic Hold
District 13	114,219	60.95%	62,441	33.32%	10,746	5.73%	187,406	Democratic Gain
District 14	183,239	79.92%	43,385	18.92%	2,659	1.16%	229,283	Democratic Hold
District 15	177,151	89.17%	15,676	7.89%	5,849	2.94%	198,676	Democratic Hold
District 16	127,179	96.59%	4,488	3.41%	0	0.00%	131,667	Democratic Hold
District 17	161,594	79.88%	40,707	20.12%	0	0.00%	202,301	Democratic Hold
District 18	174,791	68.47%	80,498	31.53%	0	0.00%	255,289	Democratic Hold
District 19	164,859	58.67%	116,120	41.33%	0	0.00%	280,979	Democratic Hold
District 20	193,651	62.13%	118,031	37.87%	0	0.00%	311,682	Democratic Hold
District 21	171,286	62.09%	96,599	35.02%	7,965	2.89%	275,850	Democratic Hold
District 22	168,558	66.44%	85,126	33.56%	0	0.00%	253,684	Democratic Hold
District 23	75,871	34.66%	143,029	65.34%	0	0.00%	218,900	Republican Hold
District 24	130,799	51.91%	120,880	48.03%	0	0.00%	251,679	Democratic Hold
District 25	157,375	54.82%	120,217	41.88%	9,483	3.30%	287,075	Democratic Gain
District 26	109,615	40.55%	148,607	54.97%	12,104	4.48%	270,326	Republican Hold
District 27	185,713	74.42%	56,354	22.58%	7,478	3.00%	249,545	Democratic Hold
District 28	172,655	78.00%	48,690	22.00%	0	0.00%	221,345	Democratic Hold
District 29	140,529	50.97%	135,199	49.03%	0	0.00%	275,728	Democratic Gain
Total	4,286,047	67.07%	2,043,162	31.97%	60,811	0.95%	6,390,020	

=== Seat allocation ===
Votes are marked under party the candidate caucuses with, regardless of ballot line.

Popular vote
Democratic	67.07%
Republican	31.97%
Other	0.96%

House seats
Democratic	89.66%
Republican	10.34%

== District 1 ==
2008 New York's 1st congressional district election
- November 4, 2008
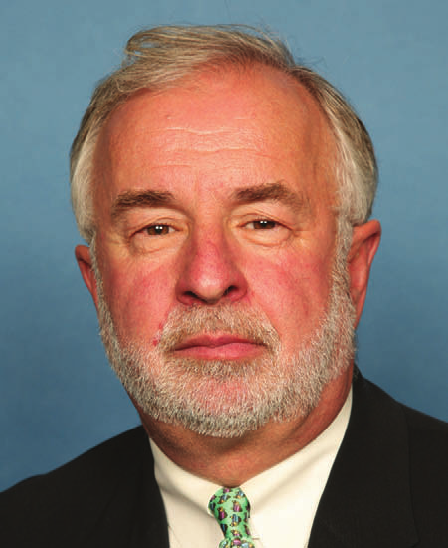

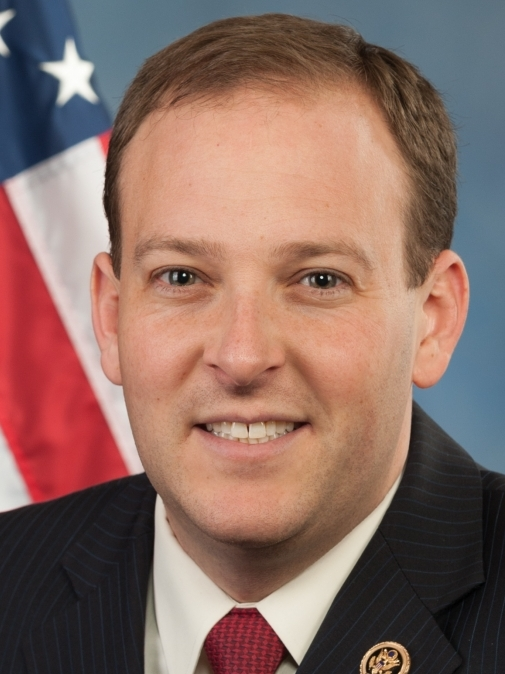
Nominee	Tim Bishop	Lee Zeldin
Party	Democratic	Republican
Alliance	Independence; Working Families	Conservative
Popular vote	162,083	115,545
Percentage	58.38%	41.62%
- County results Bishop: 50–60%
U.S. Representative before election
Tim Bishop
Democratic
Elected U.S. Representative
Tim Bishop
Democratic

The 1st district is based on the eastern end and North Shore of Long Island, including the Hamptons, the North Fork, Riverhead, Port Jefferson, Smithtown, and Brookhaven, all in Suffolk County. Due to redistricting, the district lost minimal territory, instead picking up more territory around the towns of King's Park and Smithtown from the 2nd district. The 1st district has a PVI of R+3 but voted for Barack Obama by 4 points in the concurring presidential election. The incumbent is Democrat Tim Bishop, who was reelected with 62.23% of the vote in 2006. On election day, Bishop defeated Republican nominee Lee Zeldin who would then defeat him in a rematch six years later.

=== Republican/Conservative nominee ===
- Lee Zeldin, practicing lawyer in Smithtown, New York

=== Democratic/Independence/Working Families nominee ===
- Tim Bishop, incumbent U.S. Representative since 2003 and former Provost of Southampton College

=== General election ===
==== Predictions ====
Source	Ranking	As of
The Cook Political Report	Safe D	November 6, 2008
Rothenberg	Safe D	November 2, 2008
Sabato's Crystal Ball	Safe D	November 6, 2008
Real Clear Politics	Safe D	November 7, 2008
CQ Politics	Safe D	November 6, 2008

==== Results ====
New York's 1st congressional district, 2008
Party	Candidate	Votes	%
Democratic	Tim Bishop	141,727	51.05%
Independence	Tim Bishop	12,919	4.65%
Working Families	Tim Bishop	7,437	2.68%
Total	Tim Bishop (incumbent)	162,083	58.38%
Republican	Lee Zeldin	100,036	36.03%
Conservative	Lee Zeldin	15,509	5.59%
Total	Lee Zeldin	115,545	41.62%
Write-in		13	0.01%
Total votes		277,641	100%

== District 2 ==
2008 New York's 2nd congressional district election
- November 4, 2008
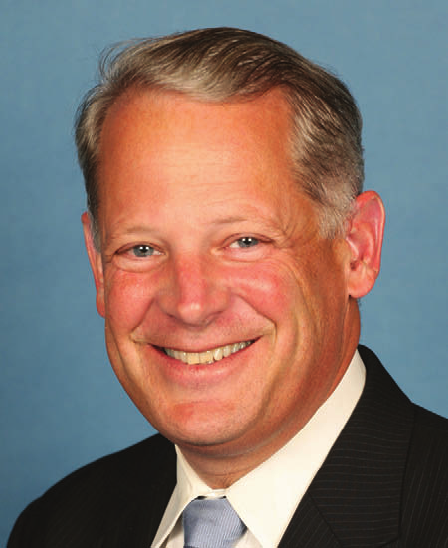

Nominee	Steve Israel	Frank Stalzer
Party	Democratic	Republican
Alliance	Independence; Working Families	Conservative
Popular vote	161,279	79,641
Percentage	66.94%	33.06%
- County results Israel: 60–70% 70–80%
U.S. Representative before election
Steve Israel
Democratic
Elected U.S. Representative
Steve Israel
Democratic

The 2nd district is based on the western end and North Shore of Long Island, including Huntington, Northport, Islandia, Half Hollow, West Hills, and parts of Islip, all in Suffolk and Nassau Counties. Due to redistricting, the district lost substantial territory, losing most of Lindenhurst, Islip, and portions of the South Shore to the 3rd district while gaining more territory on the North Shore around Huntington and portions of Nassau County. The 2nd district has a PVI of R+3 but voted for Barack Obama by 3 points in the concurring presidential election. The incumbent is Democrat Steve Israel, who was reelected with 70.42% of the vote in 2006. On election day Israel defeated Republican nominee Frank Stalzer.

=== Republican/Conservative nominee ===
- Frank Stalzer, businessman

=== Democratic/Independence/Working Families nominee ===
- Steve Israel, incumbent U.S. Representative since 2001, former member of the Huntington Town Council, and former staff member for U.S. Representative Richard Ottinger

=== General election ===
==== Predictions ====
Source	Ranking	As of
The Cook Political Report	Safe D	November 6, 2008
Rothenberg	Safe D	November 2, 2008
Sabato's Crystal Ball	Safe D	November 6, 2008
Real Clear Politics	Safe D	November 7, 2008
CQ Politics	Safe D	November 6, 2008

==== Results ====
New York's 2nd congressional district, 2008
Party	Candidate	Votes	%
Democratic	Steve Israel	143,759	59.67%
Independence	Steve Israel	11,900	4.94%
Working Families	Steve Israel	5,620	2.33%
Total	Steve Israel (incumbent)	161,279	66.94%
Republican	Frank Stalzer	70,145	29.11%
Conservative	Frank Stalzer	9,496	3.94%
Total	Frank Stalzer	79,641	33.06%
Write-in		12	0.01%
Total votes		240,932	100%

== District 3 ==
2008 New York's 3rd congressional district election
- November 4, 2008
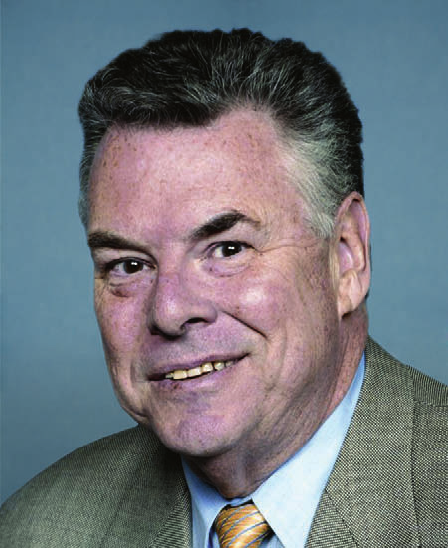

Nominee	Peter King	Graham Long
Party	Republican	Democratic
Alliance	Conservative; Independence	Working Families
Popular vote	172,774	97,525
Percentage	63.92%	36.08%
- County results King: 60–70%
U.S. Representative before election
Peter King
Republican
Elected U.S. Representative
Peter King
Republican

The 3rd district is based on the Gold Coast and Jones Beach portion of Long Island, including Glen Cove, Oyster Bay, Long Beach, Massapequa, Brookville, and parts of Islip, all in Suffolk and Nassau Counties. Due to redistricting, the district gained a large amount of territory, gaining in the southern portion of Nassau County around East Rockaway as well as a new portion of the district in Suffolk County, gaining Lindenhurst, Babylon, and portions of Islip, but lost areas around Interstate 495 in Plainview. The 3rd district has a PVI of D+2 but voted for Barack Obama by 8 points in the concurring presidential election. The incumbent is Republican Peter King, who was reelected with 56.04% of the vote in 2006. On election day King defeated Democratic nominee Graham Long.

=== Republican/Independence/Conservative nominee ===
- Peter King, incumbent U.S. Representative since 1993

=== Democratic/Working Families nominee ===
- Graham Long, Economic Development Advisor for Nassau County

=== General election ===
==== Predictions ====
Source	Ranking	As of
The Cook Political Report	Safe R	November 6, 2008
Rothenberg	Safe R	November 2, 2008
Sabato's Crystal Ball	Safe R	November 6, 2008
Real Clear Politics	Safe R	November 7, 2008
CQ Politics	Safe R	November 6, 2008

==== Results ====
New York's 3rd congressional district, 2008
Party	Candidate	Votes	%
Republican	Peter King	149,344	55.25%
Conservative	Peter King	12,983	4.80%
Independence	Peter King	10,447	3.87%
Total	Peter King (incumbent)	172,774	63.92%
Democratic	Graham Long	93,481	34.58%
Working Families	Graham Long	4,044	1.50%
Total	Graham Long	97,525	36.08%
Write-in		4	0.00%
Total votes		240,932	100%

== District 4 ==
2008 New York's 4th congressional district election
- November 4, 2008
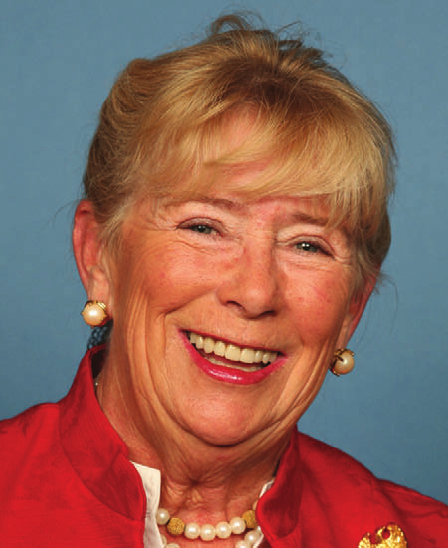

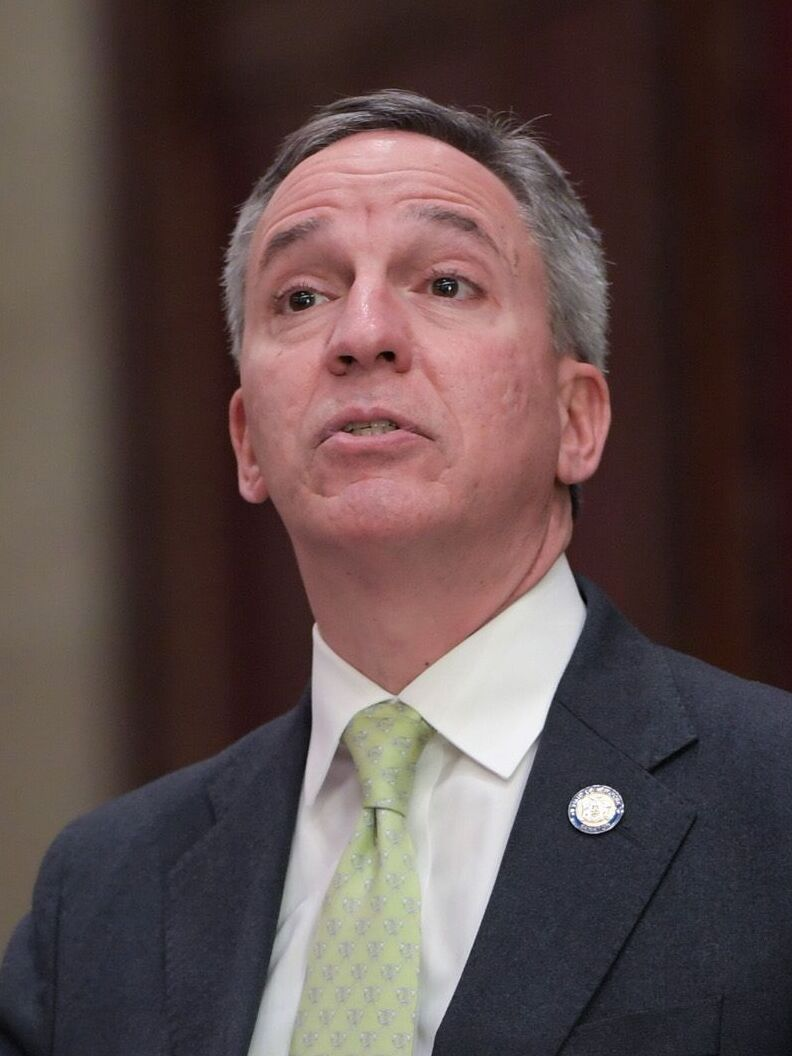
Nominee	Carolyn McCarthy	Jack Martins
Party	Democratic	Republican
Alliance	Independence; Working Families	Conservative
Popular vote	164,028	92,242
Percentage	64.01%	35.99%
- County results McCarthy: 60–70%
U.S. Representative before election
Carolyn McCarthy
Democratic
Elected U.S. Representative
Carolyn McCarthy
Democratic

The 4th district is based on the Nassau South Shore and central Nassau portion of Long Island, including Mineola, Garden City, East Rockaway, Valley Stream, Freeport, and parts of Long Beach, all in Nassau County. Due to redistricting, the district gained a small amount of territory in the southern portion of Nassau County around East Rockaway and Freeport but lost areas around Levittown. The 3rd district has a PVI of D+5 but voted for Barack Obama by 11 points in the concurring presidential election. The incumbent is Democrat Carolyn McCarthy, who was reelected with 64.92% of the vote in 2006. On election day McCarthy defeated Republican nominee Jack Martins.

=== Republican/Conservative nominee ===
- Jack Martins, Mayor of Mineola since 2003

=== Democratic/Independence/Working Families nominee ===
- Carolyn McCarthy, incumbent U.S. Representative since 1997

=== General election ===
==== Predictions ====
Source	Ranking	As of
The Cook Political Report	Safe D	November 6, 2008
Rothenberg	Safe D	November 2, 2008
Sabato's Crystal Ball	Safe D	November 6, 2008
Real Clear Politics	Safe D	November 7, 2008
CQ Politics	Safe D	November 6, 2008

==== Results ====
New York's 4th congressional district, 2008
Party	Candidate	Votes	%
Democratic	Carolyn McCarthy	151,792	59.23%
Independence	Carolyn McCarthy	7,318	2.86%
Working Families	Carolyn McCarthy	4,918	1.92%
Total	Carolyn McCarthy (incumbent)	164,028	64.01%
Republican	Jack Martins	84,444	32.95%
Conservative	Jack Martins	4,044	3.04%
Total	Jack Martins	92,242	35.99%
Write-in		1	0.00%
Total votes		256,271	100%

== District 5 ==
2008 New York's 5th congressional district election
- November 4, 2008
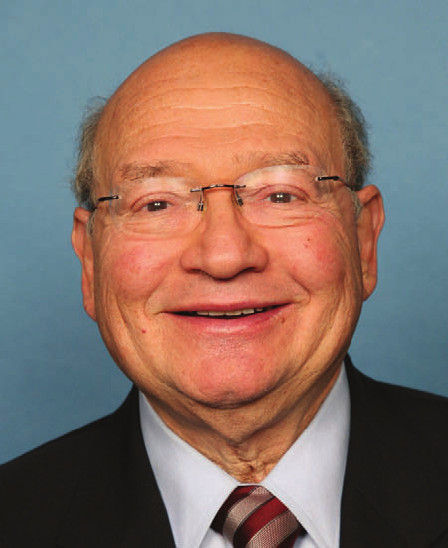

Nominee	Gary Ackerman	Elizabeth Berney
Party	Democratic	Republican
Alliance	Independence; Working Families
Popular vote	107,427	41,721
Percentage	70.65%	27.44%
U.S. Representative before election
Gary Ackerman
Democratic
Elected U.S. Representative
Gary Ackerman
Democratic

The 5th district is based on the Nassau North Shore and Flushing portion of Queens County, including Manhorhaven, Kings Point, Great Neck, East Hills, Corona, and parts of Jamaica, in Nassau and Queens counties. Due to redistricting, the district was compacted and shifted towards Queens, losing most of its territory on the North Shore, including portions of the cities of Smithtown and Huntington as well as territory in the surrounding communities. The 5th district has a PVI of D+30 but voted for Barack Obama by 27 points in the concurring presidential election. The incumbent is Democrat Gary Ackerman, who was reelected with 100.00% of the vote in 2006. On election day Ackerman defeated Republican nominee Elizabeth Berney.

=== Republican nominee ===
- Elizabeth Berney

=== Democratic/Independence/Working Families nominee ===
- Gary Ackerman, incumbent U.S. Representative since 1983

=== General election ===
==== Predictions ====
Source	Ranking	As of
The Cook Political Report	Safe D	November 6, 2008
Rothenberg	Safe D	November 2, 2008
Sabato's Crystal Ball	Safe D	November 6, 2008
Real Clear Politics	Safe D	November 7, 2008
CQ Politics	Safe D	November 6, 2008

==== Results ====
New York's 5th congressional district, 2008
Party	Candidate	Votes	%
Democratic	Gary Ackerman	105,836	59.23%
Independence	Gary Ackerman	4,084	2.86%
Working Families	Gary Ackerman	2,804	1.92%
Total	Carolyn McCarthy (incumbent)	164,028	64.01%
Republican	Elizabeth Berny	41,721	27.44%
Total	Jack Martins	41,721	27.44%
Conservative	Gonzalo "Jun" Policarpio	2,896	1.91%
Write-in		5	0.00%
Total votes		256,271	100%

== District 6 ==
2008 New York's 6th congressional district election
- November 4, 2008
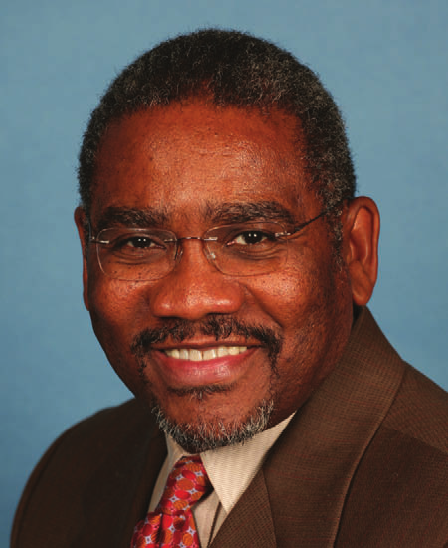
Nominee	Gregory Meeks
Party	Democratic
Popular vote	141,180
Percentage	99.98%
U.S. Representative before election
Gregory Meeks
Democratic
Elected U.S. Representative
Gregory Meeks
Democratic

Incumbent Gregory Meeks has served in Congress since 1998, representing heavily Democratic Queens. He was easily re-elected unopposed.

=== Predictions ===
Source	Ranking	As of
The Cook Political Report	Safe D	November 6, 2008
Rothenberg	Safe D	November 2, 2008
Sabato's Crystal Ball	Safe D	November 6, 2008
Real Clear Politics	Safe D	November 7, 2008
CQ Politics	Safe D	November 6, 2008

== District 7 ==
2008 New York's 7th congressional district election
- November 4, 2008
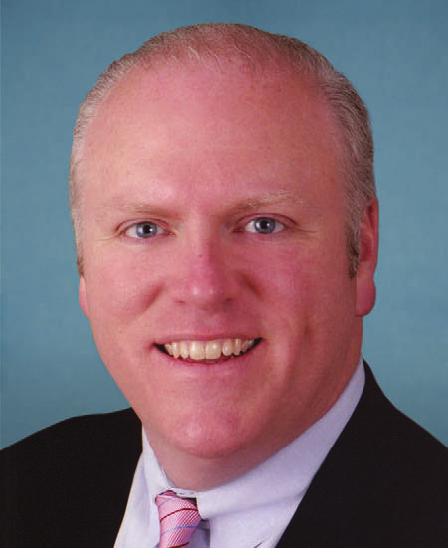

Nominee	Joe Crowley	William Britt, Jr.
Party	Democratic	Republican
Alliance	Working Families	Conservative
Popular vote	118,459	21,477
Percentage	84.65%	15.35%
- County results Crowley: 80–90%
U.S. Representative before election
Joe Crowley
Democratic
Elected U.S. Representative
Joe Crowley
Democratic

Incumbent Joe Crowley had served in Congress since 1999 representing heavily Democratic areas of the Bronx and Queens. He was easily re-elected against token opposition.

=== Predictions ===
Source	Ranking	As of
The Cook Political Report	Safe D	November 6, 2008
Rothenberg	Safe D	November 2, 2008
Sabato's Crystal Ball	Safe D	November 6, 2008
Real Clear Politics	Safe D	November 7, 2008
CQ Politics	Safe D	November 6, 2008

== District 8 ==
2008 New York's 8th congressional district election
- November 4, 2008
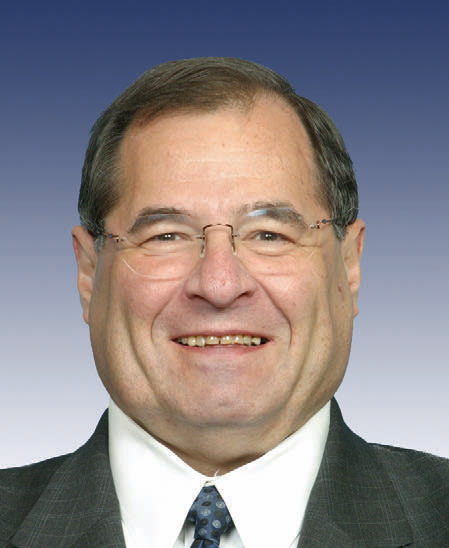

Nominee	Jerry Nadler	Grace Lin
Party	Democratic	Republican
Popular vote	160,775	39,062
Percentage	80.50%	19.5%
- County results Nadler: 60–70% 80–90%
U.S. Representative before election
Jerry Nadler
Democratic
Elected U.S. Representative
Jerry Nadler
Democratic

Incumbent Jerry Nadler had served in Congress since 1992 representing heavily Democratic areas of Manhattan. He was easily re-elected against token opposition.

=== Predictions ===
Source	Ranking	As of
The Cook Political Report	Safe D	November 6, 2008
Rothenberg	Safe D	November 2, 2008
Sabato's Crystal Ball	Safe D	November 6, 2008
Real Clear Politics	Safe D	November 7, 2008
CQ Politics	Safe D	November 6, 2008

== District 9 ==
2008 New York's 9th congressional district election
- November 4, 2008
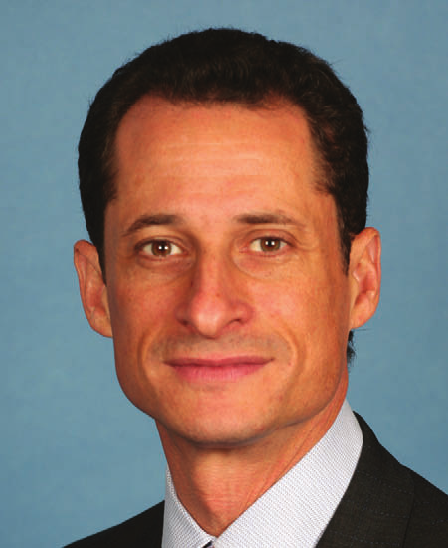

Nominee	Anthony Weiner	Alfred F. Donohue
Party	Democratic	Conservative
Popular vote	112,205	8,378
Percentage	93.10%	6.9%
- County results Weiner: 90–100%
U.S. Representative before election
Anthony Weiner
Democratic
Elected U.S. Representative
Anthony Weiner
Democratic

Incumbent Anthony Weiner was originally elected in 1998 in this heavily Democratic district representing parts of Brooklyn and Queens. He was easily re-elected against no Republican opposition.

=== Predictions ===
Source	Ranking	As of
The Cook Political Report	Safe D	November 6, 2008
Rothenberg	Safe D	November 2, 2008
Sabato's Crystal Ball	Safe D	November 6, 2008
Real Clear Politics	Safe D	November 7, 2008
CQ Politics	Safe D	November 6, 2008

== District 10 ==
2008 New York's 10th congressional district election
- November 4, 2008
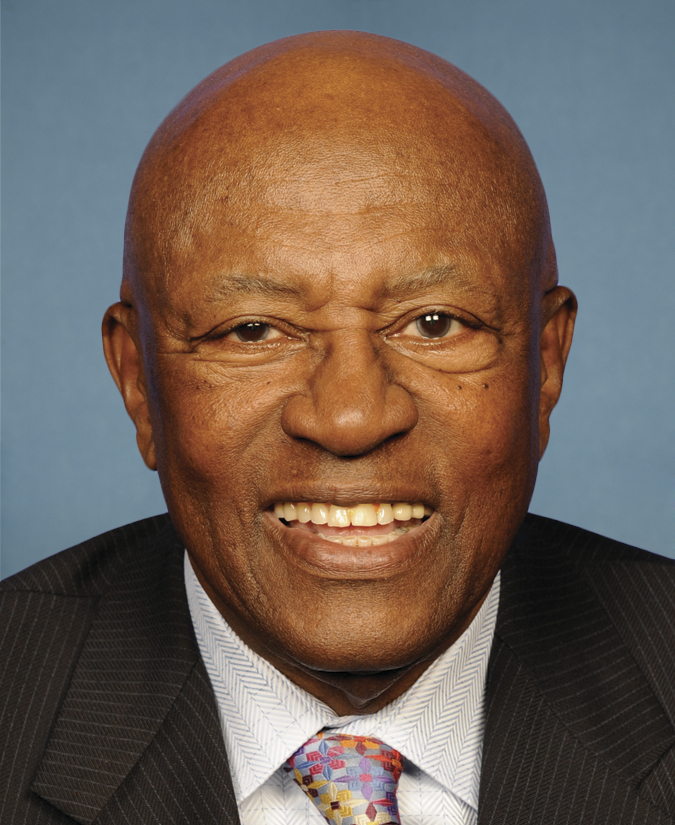

Nominee	Edolphus Towns	Herbert F. Rayn
Party	Democratic	Conservative
Popular vote	73,859	1,639
Percentage	97.80%	2.2%
U.S. Representative before election
Edolphus Towns
Democratic
Elected U.S. Representative
Edolphus Towns
Democratic

Incumbent Edolphus Downs originally was elected to Congress in 1982, representing Brooklyn. He was easily re-elected over token opposition.

=== Predictions ===
Source	Ranking	As of
The Cook Political Report	Safe D	November 6, 2008
Rothenberg	Safe D	November 2, 2008
Sabato's Crystal Ball	Safe D	November 6, 2008
Real Clear Politics	Safe D	November 7, 2008
CQ Politics	Safe D	November 6, 2008

== District 11 ==
2008 New York's 11th congressional district election
- November 4, 2008
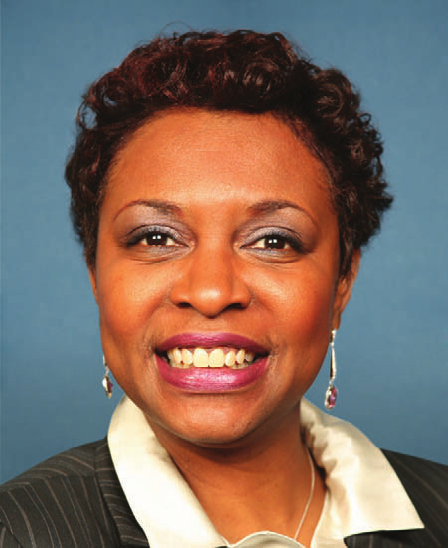

Nominee	Yvette Clarke	Hugh C. Carr
Party	Democratic	Republican
Popular vote	168,562	11,644
Percentage	92.80%	6.4%
- County results Clarke: 90–100%
U.S. Representative before election
Yvette Clarke
Democratic
Elected U.S. Representative
Yvette Clarke
Democratic

Incumbent Yvette Clarke was originally elected in 2006 and ran for re-election. She was easily re-elected in this heavily Democratic district.

=== Predictions ===
Source	Ranking	As of
The Cook Political Report	Safe D	November 6, 2008
Rothenberg	Safe D	November 2, 2008
Sabato's Crystal Ball	Safe D	November 6, 2008
Real Clear Politics	Safe D	November 7, 2008
CQ Politics	Safe D	November 6, 2008

== District 12 ==
2008 New York's 12th congressional district election
- November 4, 2008
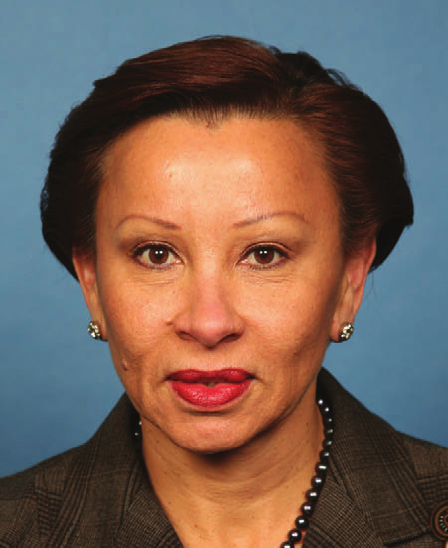

Nominee	Nydia Velázquez	Allan E. Romaguera
Party	Democratic	Republican
Popular vote	123,053	13,748
Percentage	90.00%	10.0%
- County results Velazquez: 80–90% 90–100%
U.S. Representative before election
Nydia Velázquez
Democratic
Elected U.S. Representative
Nydia Velázquez
Democratic

Incumbent Nydia Velázquez was re-elected in a landslide over Republican Allan Romaguera.

=== Predictions ===
Source	Ranking	As of
The Cook Political Report	Safe D	November 6, 2008
Rothenberg	Safe D	November 2, 2008
Sabato's Crystal Ball	Safe D	November 6, 2008
Real Clear Politics	Safe D	November 7, 2008
CQ Politics	Safe D	November 6, 2008

== District 13 ==
2008 New York's 13th congressional district election
- November 4, 2008
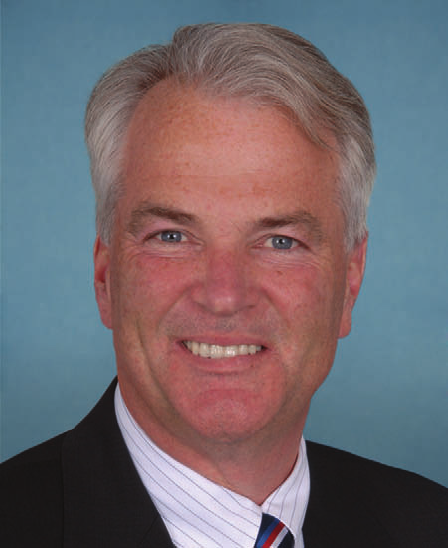

Nominee	Michael McMahon	Robert A. Straniere
Party	Democratic	Republican
Alliance	Working Families
Popular vote	114,219	62,441
Percentage	60.9%	33.3%
- County results Mcmahon: 60–70%
U.S. Representative before election
Vito Fossella
Republican
Elected U.S. Representative
Michael McMahon
Democratic

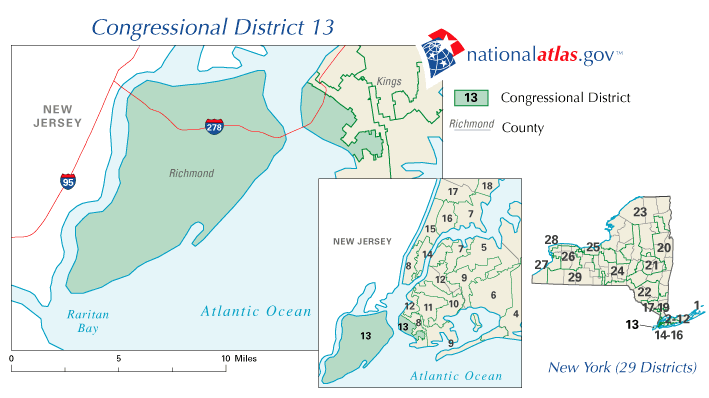

Republican incumbent Vito Fossella announced his retirement on May 20, 2008, leaving this an open seat. Democratic City Councilman Michael McMahon, endorsed by the Staten Island Democratic Party won the primary against Steve Harrison, who lost to Fossella in 2006. Republican Robert Straniere defeated Dr. Jamshad Wyne in the Republican primary. CQ Politics forecasted the race as 'Democrat Favored'. McMahon defeated Straniere in the general election.

- Race ranking and details from CQ Politics
- Campaign contributions from OpenSecrets

=== Predictions ===
Source	Ranking	As of
The Cook Political Report	Likely D (flip)	November 6, 2008
Rothenberg	Likely D (flip)	November 2, 2008
Sabato's Crystal Ball	Lean D (flip)	November 6, 2008
Real Clear Politics	Lean D (flip)	November 7, 2008
CQ Politics	Likely D (flip)	November 6, 2008

== District 14 ==
2008 New York's 14th congressional district election
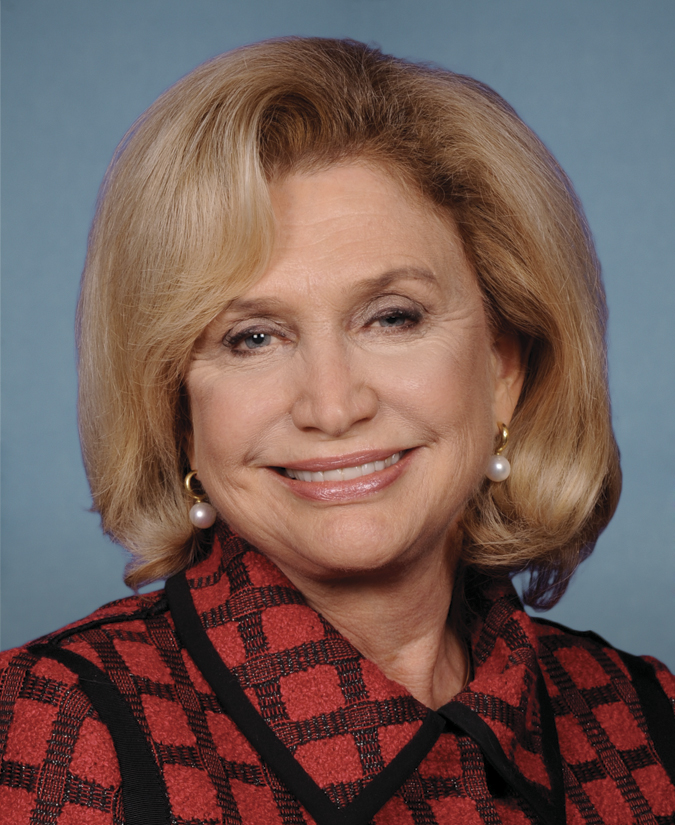

Nominee	Carolyn B. Maloney	Robert G. Heim
Party	Democratic	Republican
Popular vote	183,239	43,385
Percentage	79.9%	18.9%
- County results Maloney: 70–80% 80–90%
U.S. Representative before election
Carolyn Maloney
Democratic
Elected U.S. Representative
Carolyn B. Maloney
Democratic

=== Predictions ===
Source	Ranking	As of
The Cook Political Report	Safe D	November 6, 2008
Rothenberg	Safe D	November 2, 2008
Sabato's Crystal Ball	Safe D	November 6, 2008
Real Clear Politics	Safe D	November 7, 2008
CQ Politics	Safe D	November 6, 2008

Results

New York's 14th congressional district election, 2008
Party	Candidate	Votes	%
Democratic	Carolyn B. Maloney	183,239	79.92%
Republican	Robert G. Heim	43,385	18.92%
Libertarian	Isaiah Matos	2,659	1.16%
Total votes		229,283	100.00%

== District 15 ==
2008 New York's 15th congressional district election
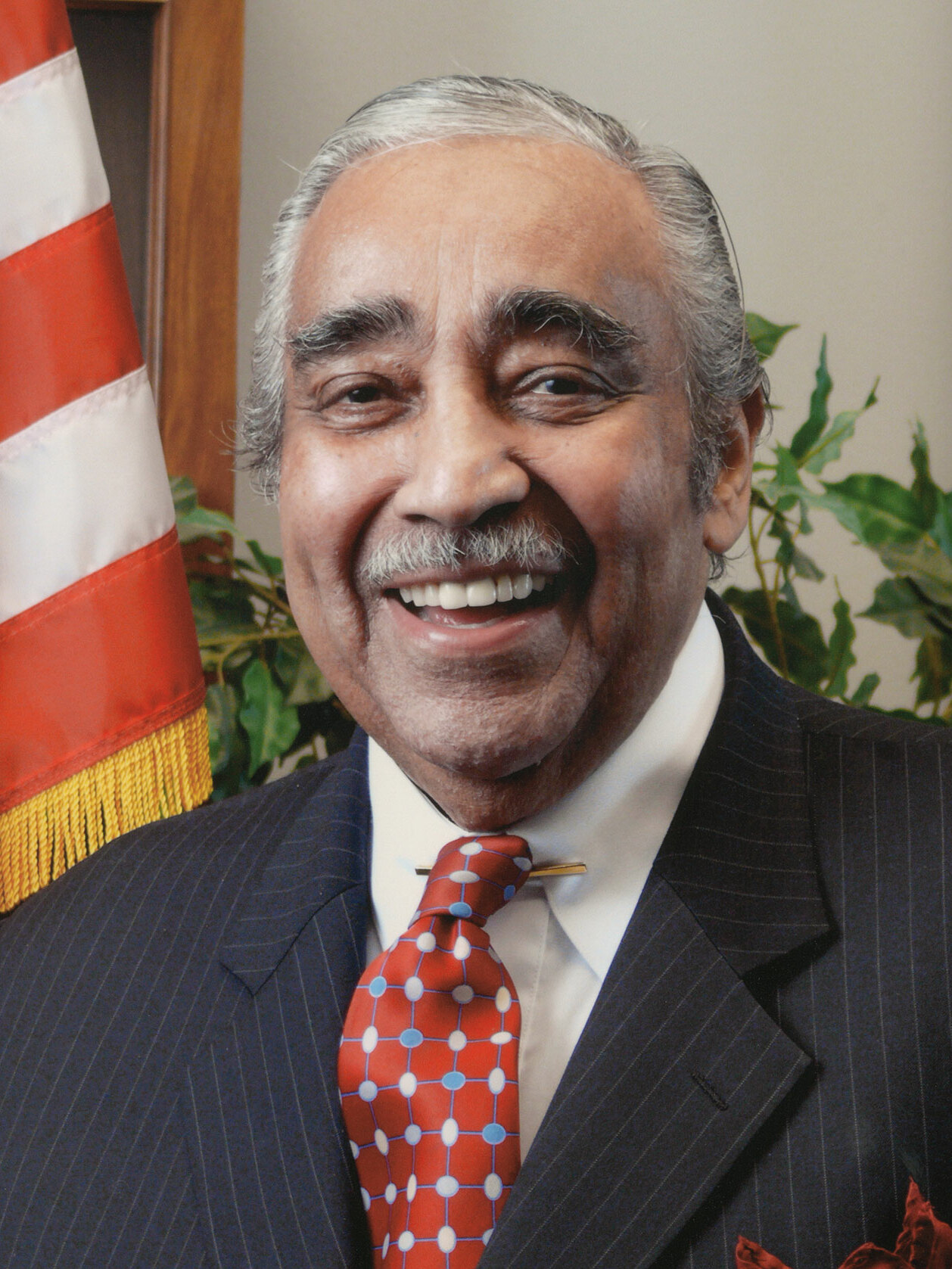

Nominee	Charles B. Rangel	Edward Daniels
Party	Democratic	Republican
Popular vote	177,151	15,676
Percentage	89.2%	7.9%
U.S. Representative before election
Charles Rangel
Democratic
Elected U.S. Representative
Charles B. Rangel
Democratic

=== Predictions ===
Source	Ranking	As of
The Cook Political Report	Safe D	November 6, 2008
Rothenberg	Safe D	November 2, 2008
Sabato's Crystal Ball	Safe D	November 6, 2008
Real Clear Politics	Safe D	November 7, 2008
CQ Politics	Safe D	November 6, 2008

Results

New York's 15th congressional district election, 2008
Party	Candidate	Votes	%
Democratic	Charles B. Rangel	177,151	89.17%
Republican	Edward Daniels	15,676	7.89%
Vote People Change	Craig Schley	3,708	1.87%
Socialist Workers	Martin Koppel	2,141	1.08%
Total votes		198,676	100.00%

== District 16 ==
2008 New York's 16th congressional district election

Nominee	José E. Serrano	Ali Mohamed
Party	Democratic	Republican
Popular vote	127,179	4,488
Percentage	96.6%	3.4%
- County results Serrano: 90–100%
U.S. Representative before election
José E. Serrano
Democratic
Elected U.S. Representative
José E. Serrano
Democratic

=== Predictions ===
Source	Ranking	As of
The Cook Political Report	Safe D	November 6, 2008
Rothenberg	Safe D	November 2, 2008
Sabato's Crystal Ball	Safe D	November 6, 2008
Real Clear Politics	Safe D	November 7, 2008
CQ Politics	Safe D	November 6, 2008

Results

New York's 16th congressional district election, 2008
Party	Candidate	Votes	%
Democratic	José E. Serrano	127,179	96.59%
Republican	Ali Mohamed	4,488	3.41%
Total votes		131,667	100.00%

== District 17 ==
2008 New York's 17th congressional district election
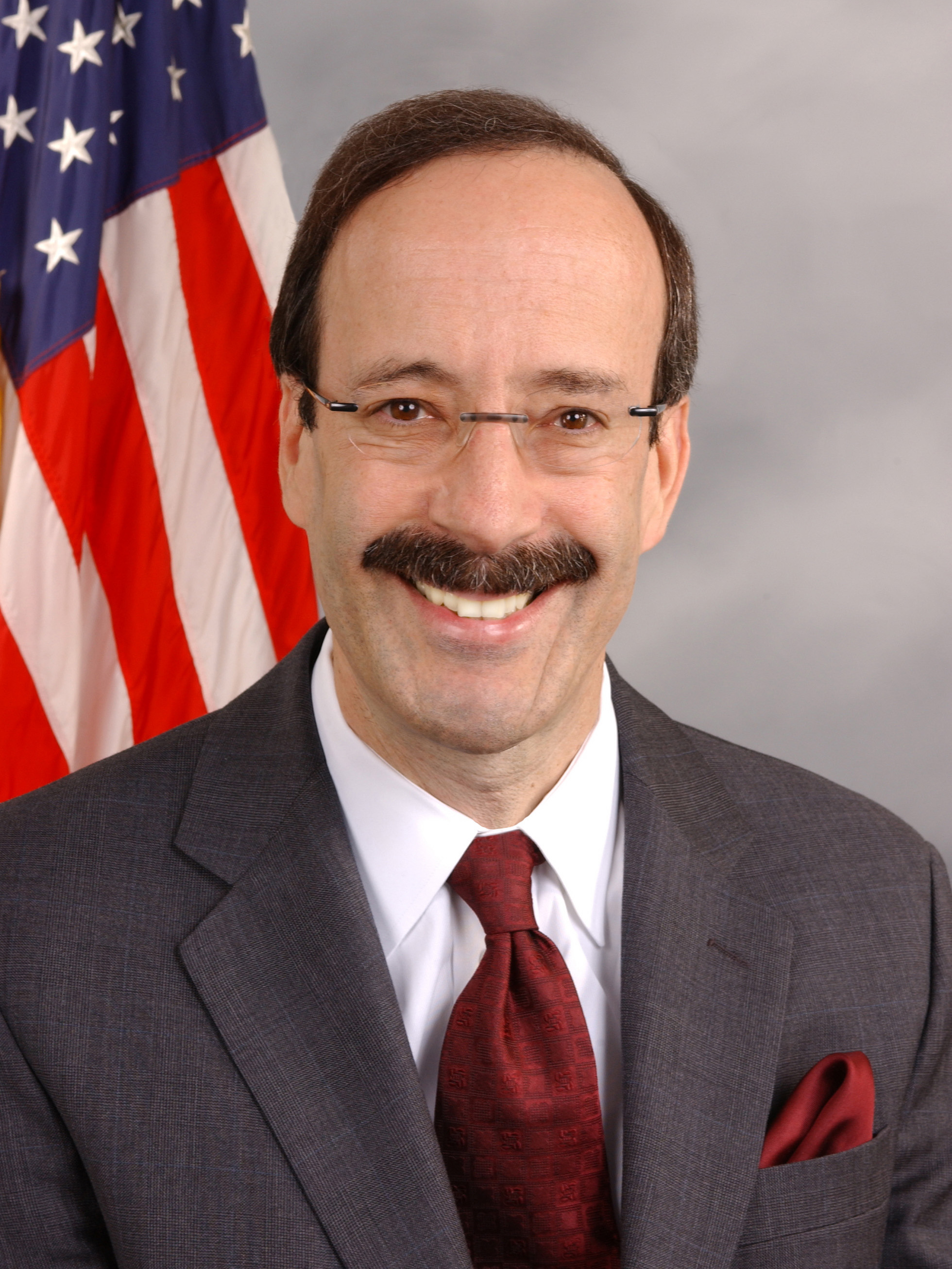

Nominee	Eliot L. Engel	Robert Goodman
Party	Democratic	Republican
Popular vote	161,594	40,707
Percentage	79.9%	20.1%
- County results Engel: 60–70% 80–90% 90–100%
U.S. Representative before election
Eliot Engel
Democratic
Elected U.S. Representative
Eliot L. Engel
Democratic

=== Predictions ===
Source	Ranking	As of
The Cook Political Report	Safe D	November 6, 2008
Rothenberg	Safe D	November 2, 2008
Sabato's Crystal Ball	Safe D	November 6, 2008
Real Clear Politics	Safe D	November 7, 2008
CQ Politics	Safe D	November 6, 2008

Results

New York's 17th congressional district election, 2008
Party	Candidate	Votes	%
Democratic	Eliot L. Engel	161,594	79.88%
Republican	Robert Goodman	40,707	20.12%
Total votes		202,301	100.00%

== District 18 ==
2008 New York's 18th congressional district election
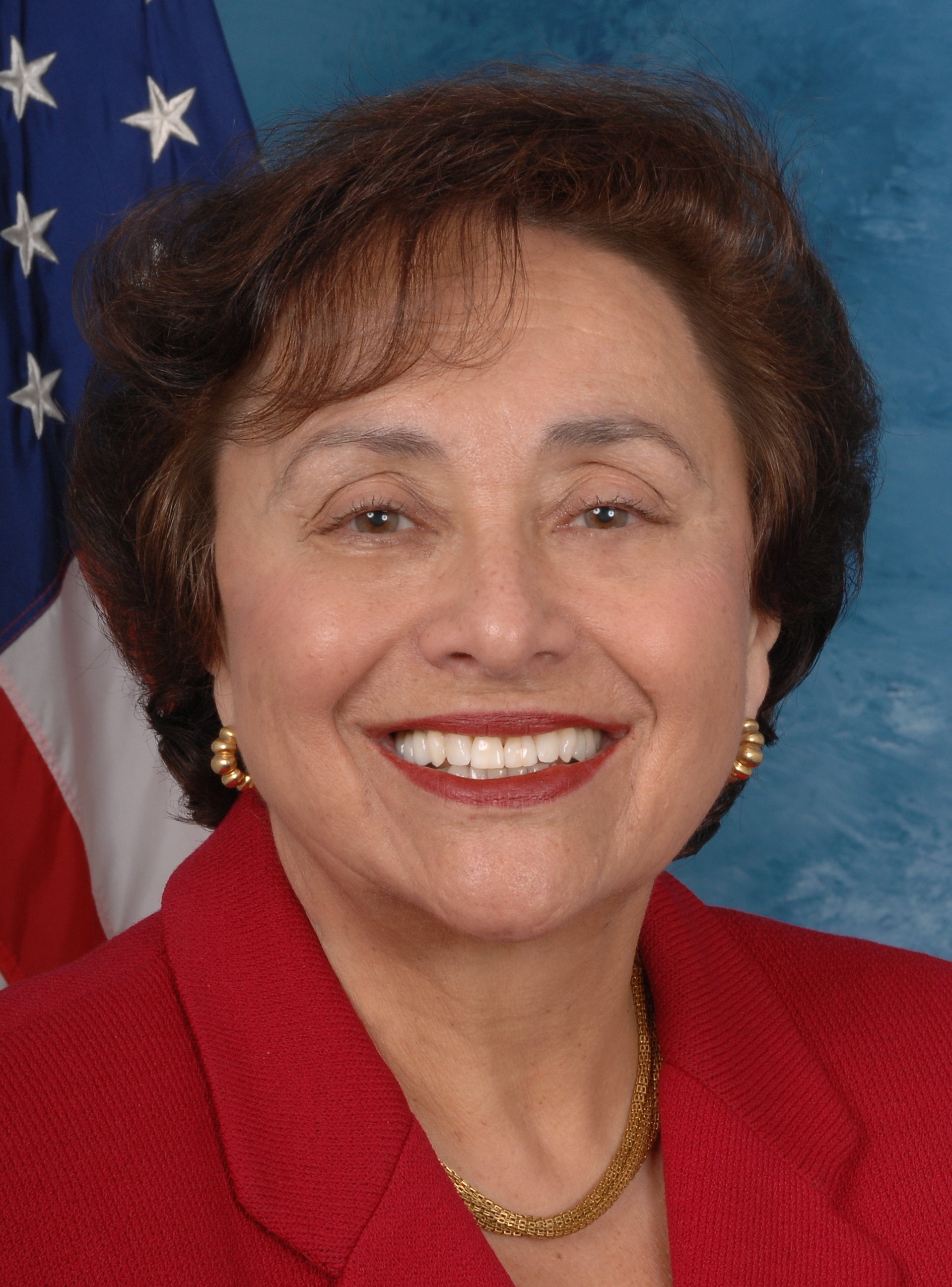

Nominee	Nita M. Lowey	Jim Russell
Party	Democratic	Republican
Popular vote	174,791	80,498
Percentage	68.5%	31.5%
- County results Lowey: 60–70%
U.S. Representative before election
Nita Lowey
Democratic
Elected U.S. Representative
Nita M. Lowey
Democratic

=== Predictions ===
Source	Ranking	As of
The Cook Political Report	Safe D	November 6, 2008
Rothenberg	Safe D	November 2, 2008
Sabato's Crystal Ball	Safe D	November 6, 2008
Real Clear Politics	Safe D	November 7, 2008
CQ Politics	Safe D	November 6, 2008

Results

New York's 18th congressional district election, 2008
Party	Candidate	Votes	%
Democratic	Nita M. Lowey	174,791	68.47%
Republican	Jim Russell	80,498	31.53%
Total votes		255,289	100.00%

== District 19 ==
2008 New York's 19th congressional district election
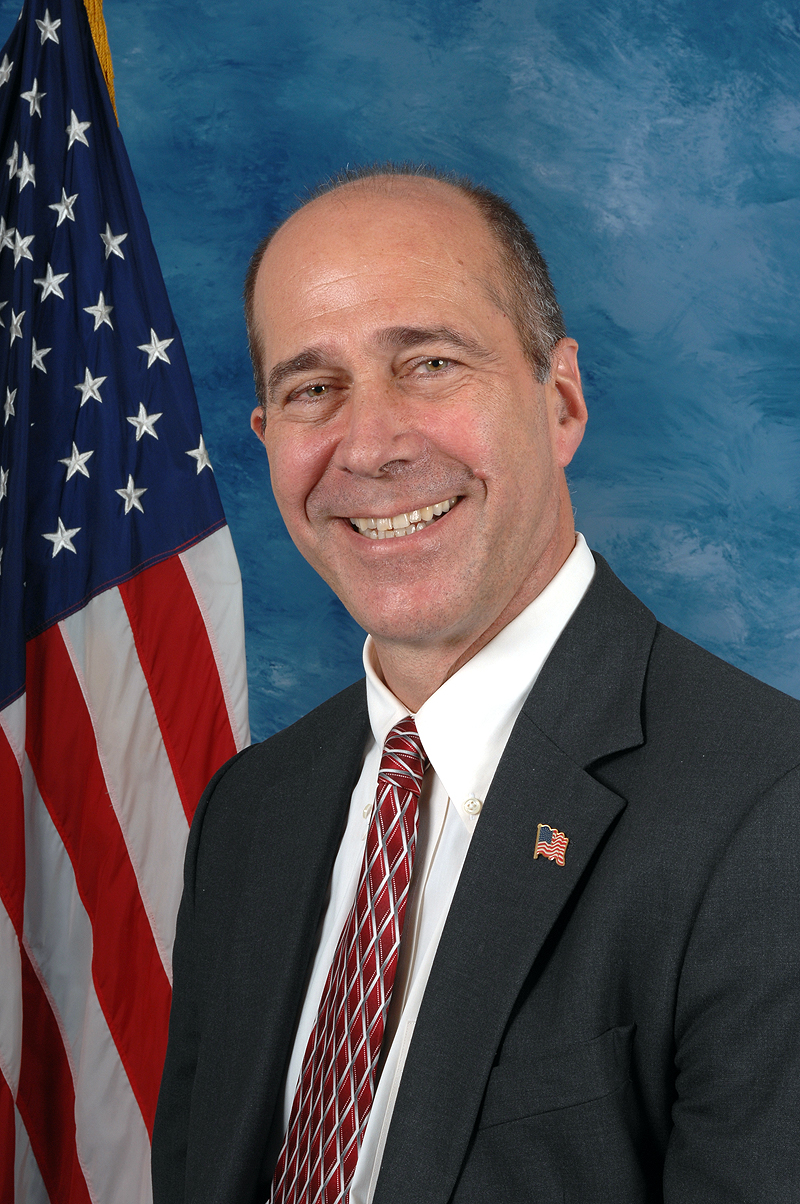

Nominee	John Hall	Kieran Lalor
Party	Democratic	Republican
Popular vote	164,859	116,120
Percentage	58.7%	41.3%
- County results Hall: 50–60% 60–70%
U.S. Representative before election
John Hall
Democratic
Elected U.S. Representative
John Hall
Democratic

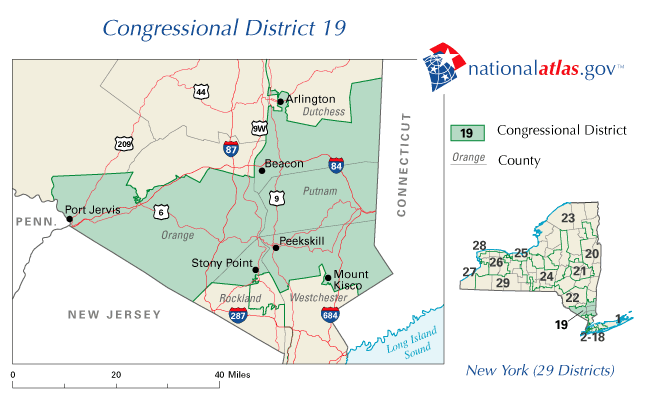
The 19th congressional district of New York, which includes Westchester and parts of the Hudson Valley.

Democratic incumbent John Hall was challenged by Republican Kieran Lalor. CQ Politics forecasted the race as 'Democrat Favored'. Hall won the election with 59% of the vote.

- Race ranking and details from CQ Politics
- Campaign contributions from OpenSecrets

=== Predictions ===
Source	Ranking	As of
The Cook Political Report	Likely D	November 6, 2008
Rothenberg	Safe D	November 2, 2008
Sabato's Crystal Ball	Lean D	November 6, 2008
Real Clear Politics	Safe D	November 7, 2008
CQ Politics	Likely D	November 6, 2008

Results

New York's 19th congressional district election, 2008
Party	Candidate	Votes	%
Democratic	John Hall	164,859	58.67%
Republican	Kieran Lalor	116,120	41.33%
Total votes		280,979	100.00%

== District 20 ==
2008 New York's 20th congressional district election
- November 4, 2008
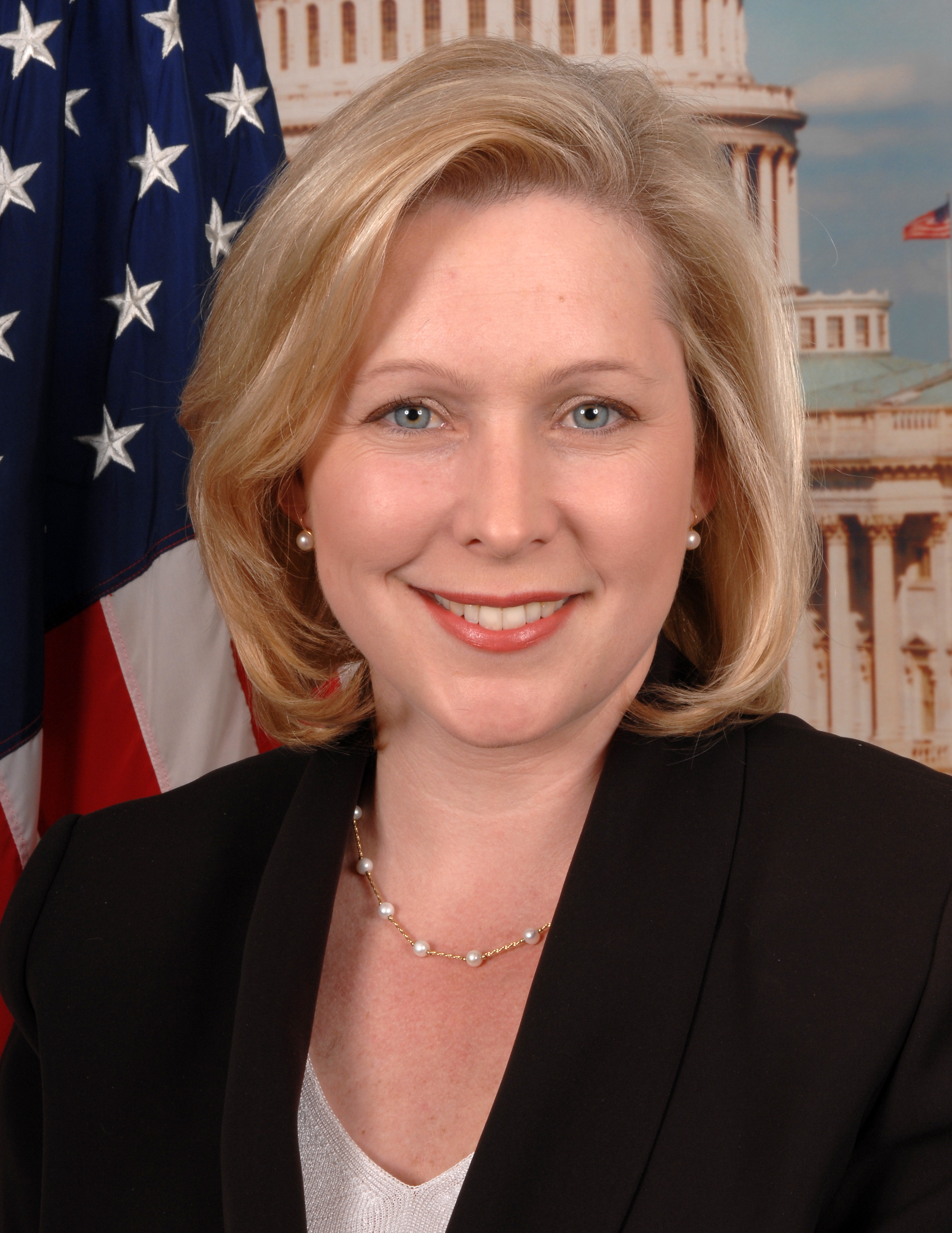

Nominee	Kirsten Gillibrand	Sandy Treadwell
Party	Democratic	Republican
Popular vote	193,651	118,031
Percentage	62.1%	37.9%
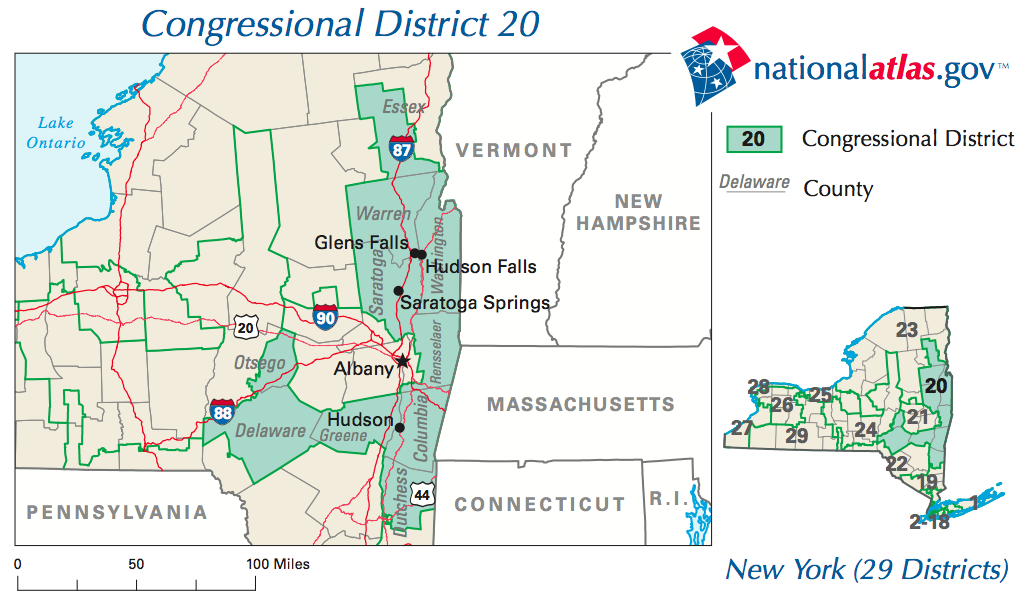
Representative before election
Kirsten Gillibrand
Democratic
Elected Representative
Kirsten Gillibrand
Democratic

Democratic incumbent Kirsten Gillibrand was challenged by Republican Sandy Treadwell. CQ Politics forecast the race as 'Leans Democratic.' Gillibrand won easily.

- Race ranking and details from CQ Politics
- Campaign contributions from OpenSecrets

This was incumbent Democrat Kirsten Gillibrand's first run for re-election, and was one of the most expensive House races in the nation, with both campaigns spending a total of more than $9 million. Gillibrand had defeated Republican Congressman John Sweeney in an upset in 2006.

Representative Gillibrand faced businessmen Morris Guller in the Democratic primary due, it was said, to her support for a supplemental appropriation for the Iraq conflict. Gilibrand won the primary by a wide margin.

Those who would have run in the 2008 Republican primary to face Gillibrand had there been one:

- Lt. Colonel Michael Rocque, US Army (retired)
- Sandy Treadwell, former New York Republican State Committee chairman
- John Wallace, New York State Police (retired)

Treadwell, with the backing of the State Conservative Party and the GOP, filed Requests for Judicial Intervention to disqualify Wallace and Rocque from the primary. He succeeded, and became the sole opponent of Kirsten Gillibrand. Gillibrand faced Republican Sandy Treadwell, former Secretary of State for New York. On October 10, 2008, the Cook Report listed the 20th District as "Likely Democratic". Gillibrand won the November 4, 2008, election with 62% of the vote to Treadwell's 38%.

=== Predictions ===
Source	Ranking	As of
The Cook Political Report	Likely D	November 6, 2008
Rothenberg	Safe D	November 2, 2008
Sabato's Crystal Ball	Lean D	November 6, 2008
Real Clear Politics	Safe D	November 7, 2008
CQ Politics	Lean D	November 6, 2008

2008 New York's 20th congressional district election
Party	Candidate	Votes	%	±%
Democratic	Kirsten Gillibrand	178,996		
Working Families	Kirsten Gillibrand	14,655		
Total	Kirsten Gillibrand	193,651	62.13	
Republican	Sandy Treadwell	99,930		
Conservative	Sandy Treadwell	10,077		
Independence	Sandy Treadwell	8,024		
Total	Sandy Treadwell	118,031	37.87	
Majority		75,620		
Turnout		311,682		
Democratic hold		Swing		

== District 21 ==
2008 New York's 21st congressional district election
- November 4, 2008
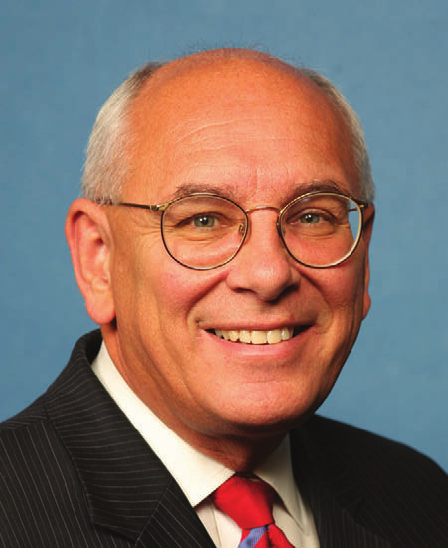

Nominee	Paul Tonko	Jim Buhrmaster
Party	Democratic	Republican
Alliance	Working Families	Conservative
Popular vote	171,286	96,599
Percentage	62.09%	35.02%
- County results Tonko: 50–60% 60–70%
U.S. Representative before election
Michael McNulty
Democratic
Elected U.S. Representative
Paul Tonko
Democratic

The 21st district is based in the Capital Region, including Albany, Troy, Schenectady, Guilderland, Johnstown, Amsterdam, Colonie, Cohoes, and Waterford. It includes all of Albany, Schenectady, Schoharie, Montgomery counties, and parts of Rensselaer, Saratoga, and Fulton Counties. Due to redistricting, the district gained a large amount of territory, gaining the entirety of Schoharie and Montgomery Counties, as well as the cities of Johnstown and Gloversville, and territory in southern Rensselaer County around East Greenbush and Castleton-On-The-Hudson. The 21st district has a PVI of R+9 but voted for Barack Obama by 18 points in the concurring presidential election. The incumbent is Democrat Michael McNulty, who was reelected with 78.19% of the vote in 2006. He is retiring. On election day, Tonko defeated Republican nominee Jim Buhrmaster.

=== Republican/Conservative nominee ===
- Jim Buhrmaster, Member of the Schenectady County Legislature from District 3

==== Eliminated in primary ====
- Steven Vasquez, Ron Paul supporter

==== Primary results ====
Republican primary results
Party	Candidate	Votes	%
Republican	Jim Buhrmaster	8,589	70.44
Republican	Steven Vasquez	3,605	29.56
Total votes		12,194	100.0

=== Democratic/Working Families nominee ===
- Paul D. Tonko, Member of the New York State Assembly from the 105th State Assembly district since 1983

==== Eliminated in primary ====
- M. Tracey Brooks, Democratic nominee for 108th State Assembly district in 2002
- Phillip G. Steck, Member of the Albany County Legislature for the 15th district since 1999 and Colonie Town Democratic chairman
- Darius Shahinfar
- Joseph P. Sullivan, perennial candidate

==== Declined ====
- Neil Breslin, Member of the New York State Senate from the 46th State Senate district since 1997

==== Endorsements ====
M. Tracey Brooks

Individuals

- Gerald D. Jennings, Mayor of Albany since 1994 and former Member of the Albany Common Council from the 11th Ward
Phillip G. Steck

Individuals

- Rob Reilly, Member of the New York State Assembly from the 109th State Assembly district since 2005

Organizations

- Independence Party of New York
- Democracy for America, Hudson/Mohawk Chapter
- Albany County Democratic Committee

==== Primary results ====
Democratic primary results
Party	Candidate	Votes	%
Democratic	Paul D. Tonko	15,932	39.50
Democratic	M. Tracey Brooks	12,166	30.16
Democratic	Phillip G. Steck	7,498	18.59
Democratic	Darius Shahinfar	4,002	9.92
Democratic	Joseph P. Sullivan	738	1.83
Total votes		40,336	100.0

Democratic primary results by county: Tonko: Tonko—50–60%; Tonko—60–70%; Tonko—70–80%; Brooks: Brooks—30–40%; Brooks—40–50%

=== General election ===
==== Predictions ====
Source	Ranking	As of
The Cook Political Report	Safe D	November 6, 2008
Rothenberg	Safe D	November 2, 2008
Sabato's Crystal Ball	Safe D	November 6, 2008
Real Clear Politics	Safe D	November 7, 2008
CQ Politics	Safe D	November 6, 2008

==== Results ====
New York's 21st congressional district, 2008
Party	Candidate	Votes	%
Democratic	Paul Tonko	159,849	57.94%
Working Families	Paul Tonko	11,437	4.15%
Total	Paul Tonko (incumbent)	171,286	62.09%
Republican	Jim Buhrmaster	85,267	30.91%
Conservative	Jim Buhrmaster	11,332	4.11%
Total	Jim Buhrmaster	96,599	35.02%
Independence	Phil Steck	7,965	2.89%
Write-in		22	0.01%
Total votes		275,872	100%

== District 22 ==
2008 New York's 22nd congressional district election
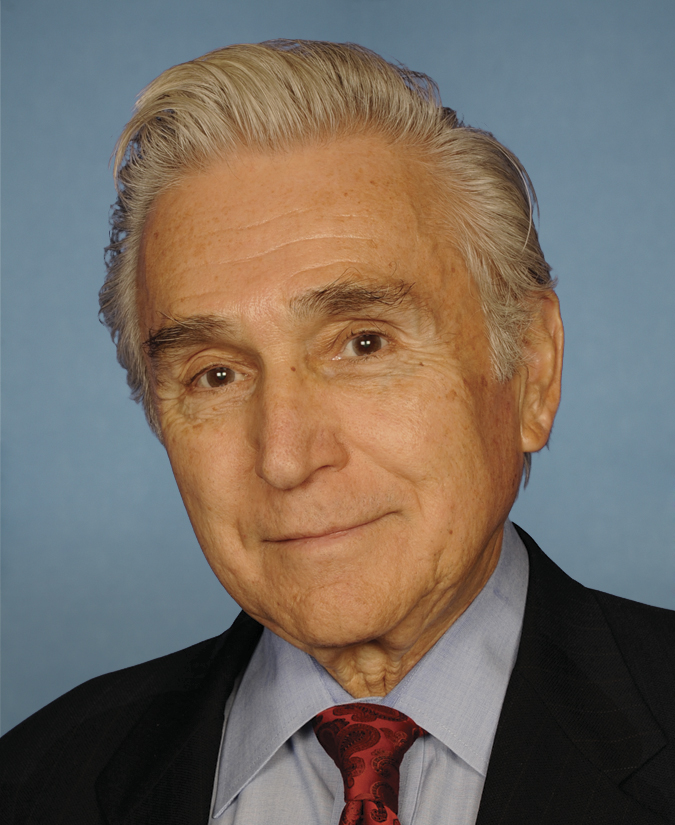

Nominee	Maurice D. Hinchey	George K. Phillips
Party	Democratic	Republican
Popular vote	168,558	85,126
Percentage	66.4%	33.6%
- County results Hinchey: 50–60% 60–70% 70–80% 80–90%
U.S. Representative before election
Maurice Hinchey
Democratic
Elected U.S. Representative
Maurice D. Hinchey
Democratic

=== Predictions ===
Source	Ranking	As of
The Cook Political Report	Safe D	November 6, 2008
Rothenberg	Safe D	November 2, 2008
Sabato's Crystal Ball	Safe D	November 6, 2008
Real Clear Politics	Safe D	November 7, 2008
CQ Politics	Safe D	November 6, 2008

Results

New York's 22nd congressional district election, 2008
Party	Candidate	Votes	%
Democratic	Maurice D. Hinchey	168,558	66.44%
Republican	George K. Phillips	85,126	33.56%
Total votes		253,684	100.00%

== District 23 ==
2008 New York's 23rd congressional district election
- November 4, 2008
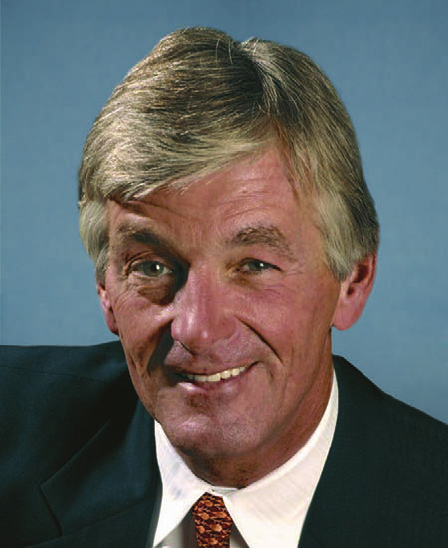

Nominee	John McHugh	Michael Oot
Party	Republican	Democratic
Popular vote	143,028	75,871
Percentage	65.33%	34.66%
- County results McHugh: 50–60% 60–70% 70–80%
U.S. Representative before election
John McHugh
Republican
Elected U.S. Representative
John McHugh
Republican

The 23rd district is based in the North Country and the Adirondack Mountains, including Plattsburgh, Potsdam, Fort Drum, Watertown, Oswego, and parts of Saranac Lake. It includes all of Clinton, Franklin, St. Lawrence, Hamilton, Lewis, Jefferson, Oswego, and Madison counties and parts of Fulton, Oneida, and Essex counties. Due to redistricting, the district was renumbered from the 24th to the 23rd and changed a small amount of territory, gaining in portions of Essex County around the Adirondack Mountains as well as a new portion of the district in Oneida County, gaining the towns around the cities of Rome and Utica, and gained the entirety of Madison County, but lost its portion of Herkimer County entirely and the cities of Gloversville and Amsterdam in Fulton County. The 23rd district has a PVI of R+2 but voted for Barack Obama by 1 point in the concurring presidential election. The incumbent is Republican John McHugh, who was reelected with 63.15% of the vote in 2006. On election day, McHugh defeated Democratic nominee Michael Oot.

=== Republican nominee ===
- John McHugh, incumbent U.S. Representative since 1993

=== Democratic nominee ===
- Michael Oot, Attorney

=== General election ===
==== Predictions ====
Source	Ranking	As of
The Cook Political Report	Safe R	November 6, 2008
Rothenberg	Safe R	November 2, 2008
Sabato's Crystal Ball	Safe R	November 6, 2008
Real Clear Politics	Safe R	November 7, 2008
CQ Politics	Safe R	November 6, 2008

==== Results ====
New York's 23rd congressional district, 2008
Party	Candidate	Votes	%
Republican	John McHugh	143,028	65.33%
Total	John McHugh (incumbent)	143,028	65.33%
Democratic	Michael Oot	75,871	34.66%
Total	Michael Oot	75,871	34.66%
Write-in		25	0.01%
Total votes		218,924	100%

== District 24 ==
2008 New York's 24th congressional district election
- November 4, 2008
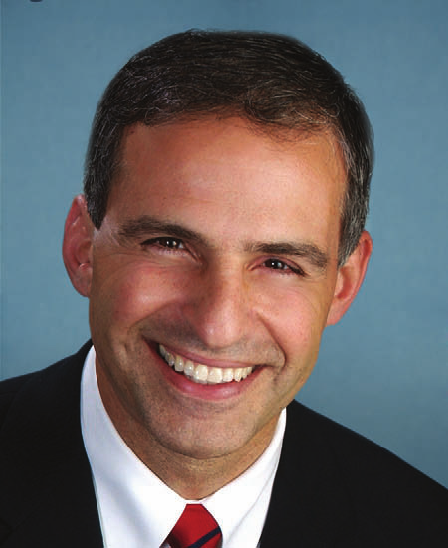

Nominee	Michael Arcuri	Richard Hanna
Party	Democratic	Republican
Alliance	Working Families	Conservative
Popular vote	130,799	120,880
Percentage	51.97%	48.03%
- County results Arcuri: 50–60% 60–70% Hanna: 50–60%
U.S. Representative before election
Michael Arcuri
Democratic
Elected U.S. Representative
Michael Arcuri
Democratic

The 24th district is based in central New York and parts of the Finger Lakes region, including Rome, Utica, Oneonta, Norwich, Auburn, and parts of Binghamton. It includes all of Herkimer, Cortland, Chenango, and Seneca counties and parts of Tompkins, Tioga, Broome, Ontario, Otsego, and Oneida counties. Due to redistricting, the district was renumbered from the 23rd to the 24th and changed large amounts of territory, gaining the entirety of Cortland, Herkimer, and Seneca Counties. The district lost all of its territory in Schoharie, Delaware, and Montgomery counties and lost portions of Oneida county north of the city of Rome. The district now has territory stretching into western New York, gaining portions of Cayuga, Tioga, Tompkins, and Ontario counties. The 24th district has a PVI of R+11 but voted for Barack Obama by 3 points in the concurring presidential election. The incumbent is Democrat Michael Arcuri, who was elected with 53.95% of the vote in 2006. On election day, Arcuri defeated Republican nominee Richard Hanna.

=== Republican/Conservative/Independence nominee ===
- Richard Hanna, CEO of Hanna Construction

=== Democratic/Working Families nominee ===
- Michael Arcuri, incumbent U.S. Representative since 2007

=== General election ===
==== Predictions ====
Source	Ranking	As of
The Cook Political Report	Likely D	November 6, 2008
Rothenberg	Safe D	November 2, 2008
Sabato's Crystal Ball	Lean D	November 6, 2008
Real Clear Politics	Safe D	November 7, 2008
CQ Politics	Likely D	November 6, 2008

==== Results ====
New York's 24th congressional district, 2008
Party	Candidate	Votes	%
Democratic	Michael Arcuri	130,799	51.97%
Total	Michael Arcuri (incumbent)	130,799	51.97%
Republican	Richard Hanna	120,880	48.03%
Total	Richard Hanna	120,880	48.03%
Write-in		13	0.01%
Total votes		251,692	100%

== District 25 ==
2008 New York's 25th congressional district election
- November 4, 2008
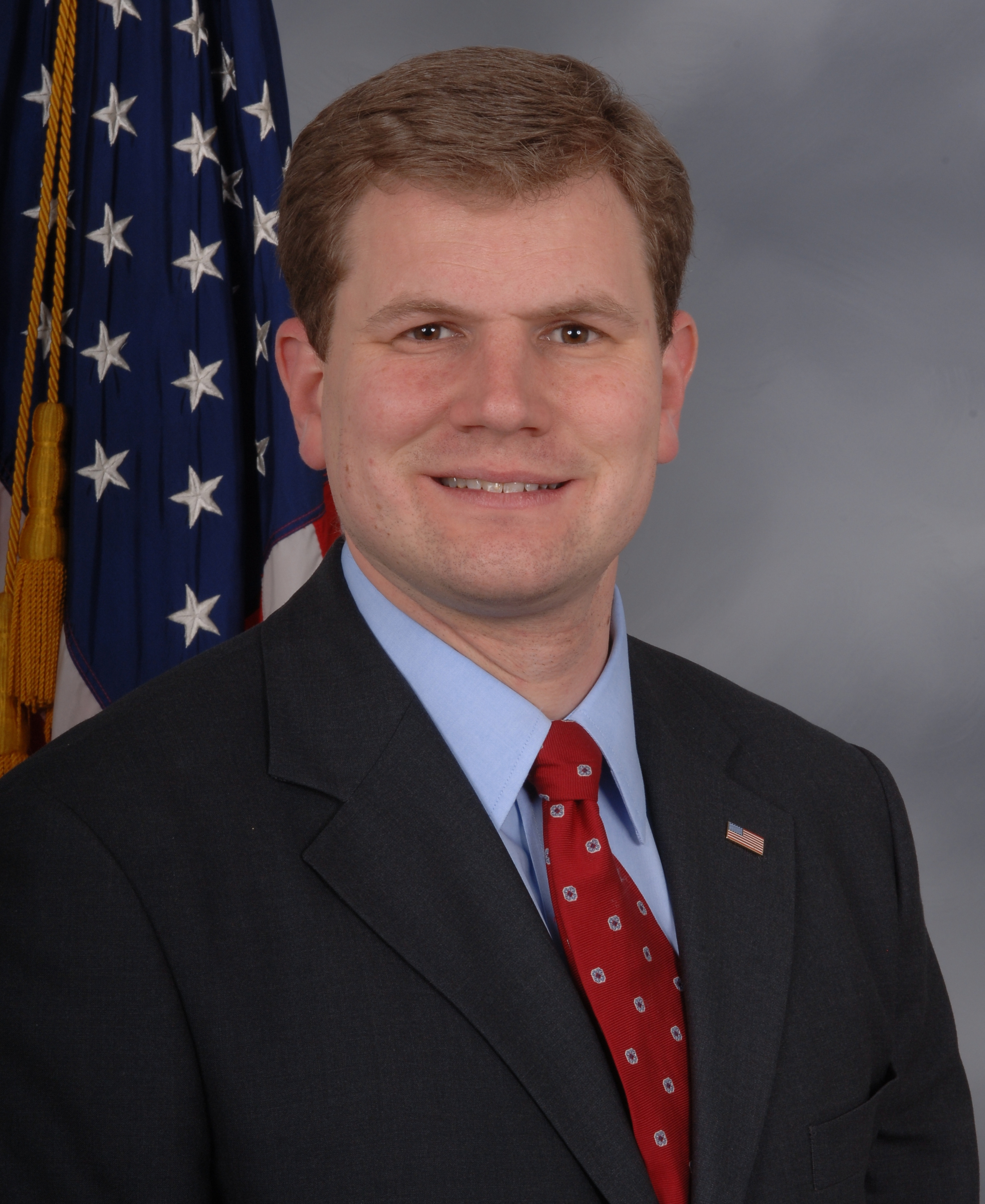
Nominee	Dan Maffei	Dale Sweetland
Party	Democratic	Republican
Popular vote	146,411	113,358
Percentage	54.5%	42.2%
Representative before election
James T. Walsh
Republican
Elected Representative
Dan Maffei
Democratic

Republican incumbent James T. Walsh retired, leaving this an open seat. Democrat Dan Maffei ran against Republican Dale Sweetland who won in a crowded primary race, and frequent candidate Howie Hawkins (who used the "Green Populist" label). CQ Politics forecasted the race as 'Leans Democratic'. Maffei won the election.

- Race ranking and details from CQ Politics
- Campaign contributions from OpenSecrets

The New York 25th congressional district election for the 111th Congress was held on November 4, 2008. The race featured Democratic Party nominee Dan Maffei, who narrowly lost to incumbent Jim Walsh for the same seat in 2006, Republican Party nominee Dale Sweetland, former Chairman of the Onondaga County Legislature, and Green Party nominee Howie Hawkins, Green Party founder and frequent political candidate.

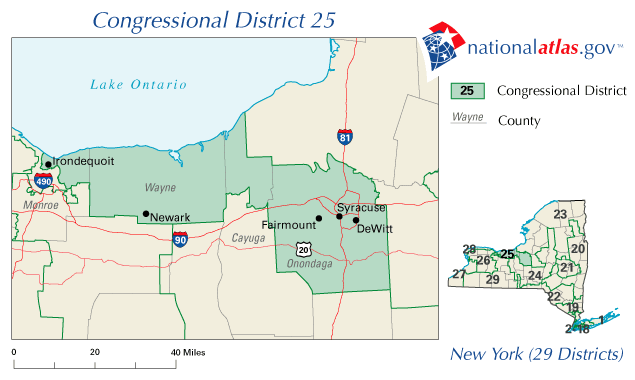
New York's 25th congressional district from 2003-2013

Maffei defeated Sweetland decisively, 55% to 42%, becoming the first Democrat to represent the district since 1981. On January 24, 2008, Republican incumbent Jim Walsh announced he would not be running for an eleventh term. Walsh's 2006 Democratic challenger Dan Maffei had already announced his candidacy to challenge the seat in 2008, and had mounted a strong campaign. In March 2008, after Democratic Syracuse Mayor Matt Driscoll announced he would not be running for the seat, Maffei was virtually assured of the Democratic nomination, and ran unopposed in the Democratic primary on September 9. After it appeared he might run unopposed in the general election, on April 2 Republican Dale Sweetland, coming off a narrowly unsuccessful September 2007 bid for Onondaga County Executive, announced he'd oppose Maffei. Other Republicans followed suit, but Sweetland won the crowded primary and received the party nomination in May 2008.

Maffei was heavily favored to win the seat, and lead heavily in campaign contributions. In addition to rating the district as "Leans Democratic", RealClearPolitics ranked this as the third most likely Congressional district to switch parties. Going into the election, other pundits from CQ Politics, The Cook Report, and the Rothenberg Report are also ranking it as "Lean Democrat" to "Democrat Favored". In May 2008, and again on June 20, 2008, The Washington Post's Chris Cillizza, author of "The Fix", ranked the race as the #1 Congressional race to turn over from a "Red" seat to a "Blue" seat 2008. Although Walsh had held it without serious difficulty before his near-defeat in 2006, the 25th had swung heavily to the Democrats at most other levels since the 1990s. The last Republican presidential candidate to carry the district was George H. W. Bush in 1988. On November 4 Maffei defeated Sweetland, 55% to 42%. He will be the first Democrat to represent the area since 1981 (when it was the 32nd District).

=== Predictions ===
Source	Ranking	As of
The Cook Political Report	Likely D (flip)	November 6, 2008
Rothenberg	Likely D (flip)	November 2, 2008
Sabato's Crystal Ball	Lean D (flip)	November 6, 2008
Real Clear Politics	Lean D (flip)	November 7, 2008
CQ Politics	Likely D (flip)	November 6, 2008

2008 US House election: New York District 25, 99.2% reporting
Party	Candidate	Votes	%	±%
Democratic	Dan Maffei	146,411	54.5	+5.3
Republican	Dale Sweetland	113,358	42.2	+42.2
Green	Howie Hawkins	8,855	3.3	+3.3
Majority		33,053	12.3	+10.7
Turnout		268,624	100	+23.4

== District 26 ==
2008 United States House of Representatives elections in New York
- November 4, 2008
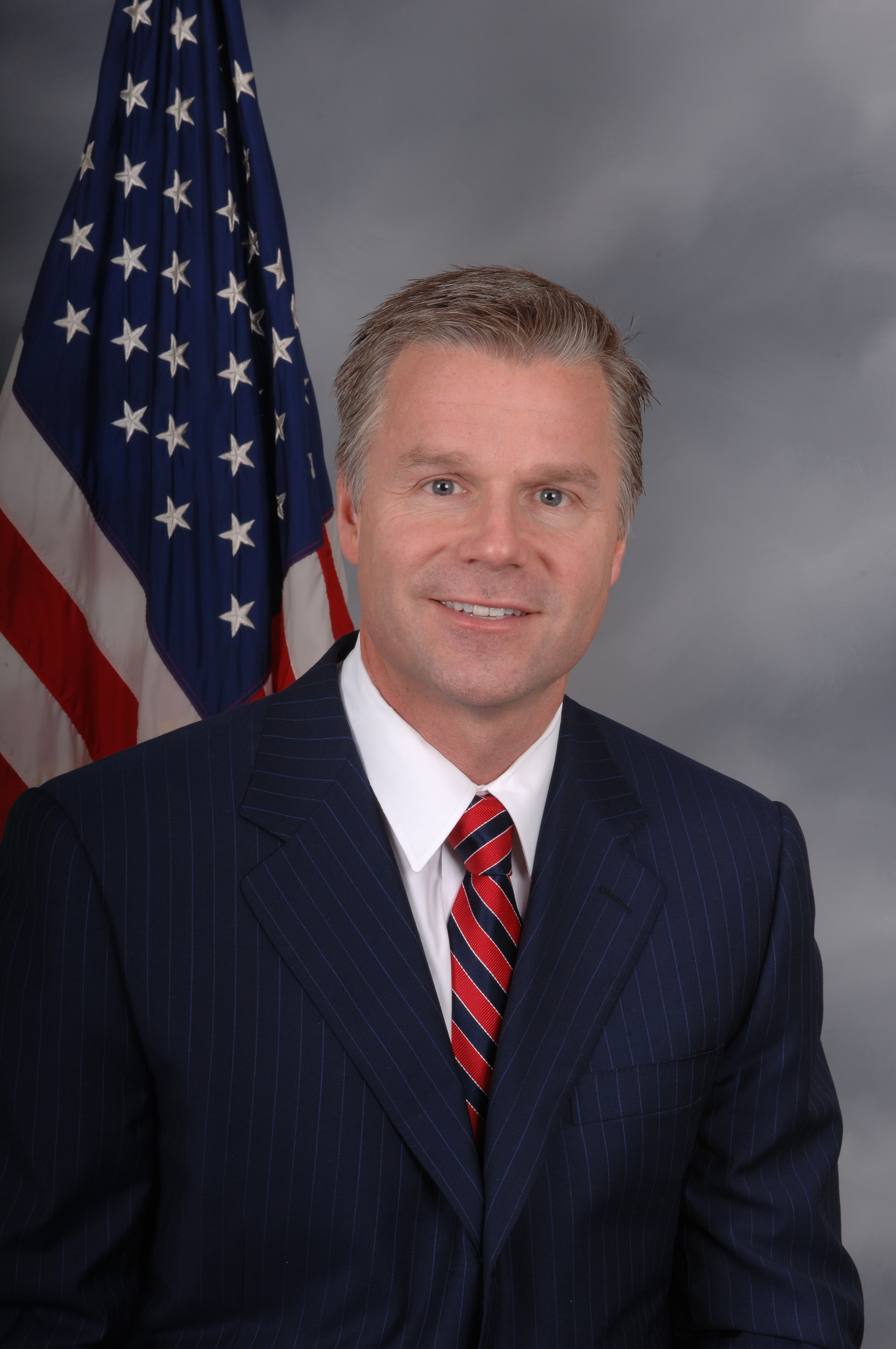
Nominee	Chris Lee	Alice Kryzan
Party	Republican	Democratic
Popular vote	148,607	109,615
Percentage	55.0%	40.5%
- County results Lee: 50–60% 60–70%
Representative before election
Thomas M. Reynolds
Republican
Elected Representative
Chris Lee
Republican

Republican incumbent Thomas M. Reynolds retired, leaving this an open seat. In an upset victory, Amherst environmental lawyer Alice Kryzan won the Democratic primary against Iraq War veteran Jonathan Powers and maverick millionaire Jack Davis. The Republican nominee was businessman Christopher Lee.

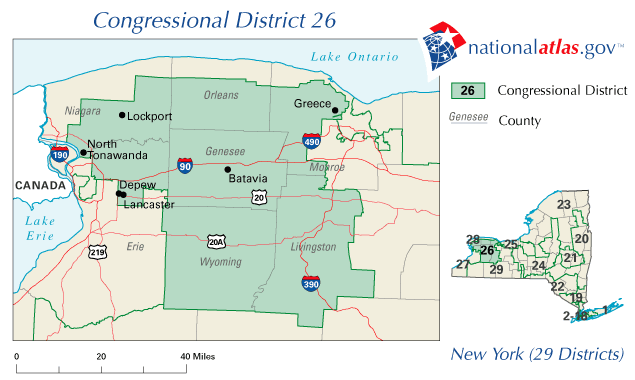

Republican nominee Christopher J. Lee (R) defeated Democrat Alice Kryzan by a wide margin, 55% to 40.5%, even though several analysts rated the race as a toss-up.

Alice Kryzan, an environmental attorney, won the Democratic party primary election on Tuesday, September 9, 2008. She ran against Jon Powers, an Iraq war veteran and the endorsed Democratic candidate, as well as wealthy industrialist Jack Davis. The primary was notable for its large negative ad content, most heavily by self-financed Davis against Powers. Kryzan upset the conventional wisdom with a surprise win, partially on the strength of a last-minute TV ad characterizing the other two candidates as squabbling. A major selling point Kryzan used was that both of her primary rivals were former Republicans. Powers remained on the Working Families Party ballot line despite endorsing Kryzan and attempting to get himself removed after having moved out of state. The Republican party brought a lawsuit to prevent the line from being given to Kryzan. However, the presence of Powers on the ballot made no difference to the outcome of the race as the number of votes his ballot line received was much smaller than the margin of victory for Lee. Republican Chris Lee was the only candidate running for the party nomination and was endorsed by incumbent Representative Tom Reynolds. Operatives within the party also reportedly tried to recruit several other high-profile candidates, including WIVB-TV anchor Don Postles, a registered independent, which led to Postles having to issue an on-air rejection of their efforts.

=== Predictions ===
Source	Ranking	As of
The Cook Political Report	Tossup	November 6, 2008
Rothenberg	Tilt R	November 2, 2008
Sabato's Crystal Ball	Lean R	November 6, 2008
Real Clear Politics	Safe R	November 7, 2008
CQ Politics	Lean R	November 6, 2008

2008 US House election: New York District 26
Party	Candidate	Votes	%
Republican	Chris Lee	148,607	55.0%
Democratic	Alice Kryzan	109,615	40.5%
Working Families	Jon Powers	12,104	4.5%
Majority		38,992	14.5%
Turnout		270,326	100%

== District 27 ==
2008 New York's 27th district congressional election
- November 4, 2008
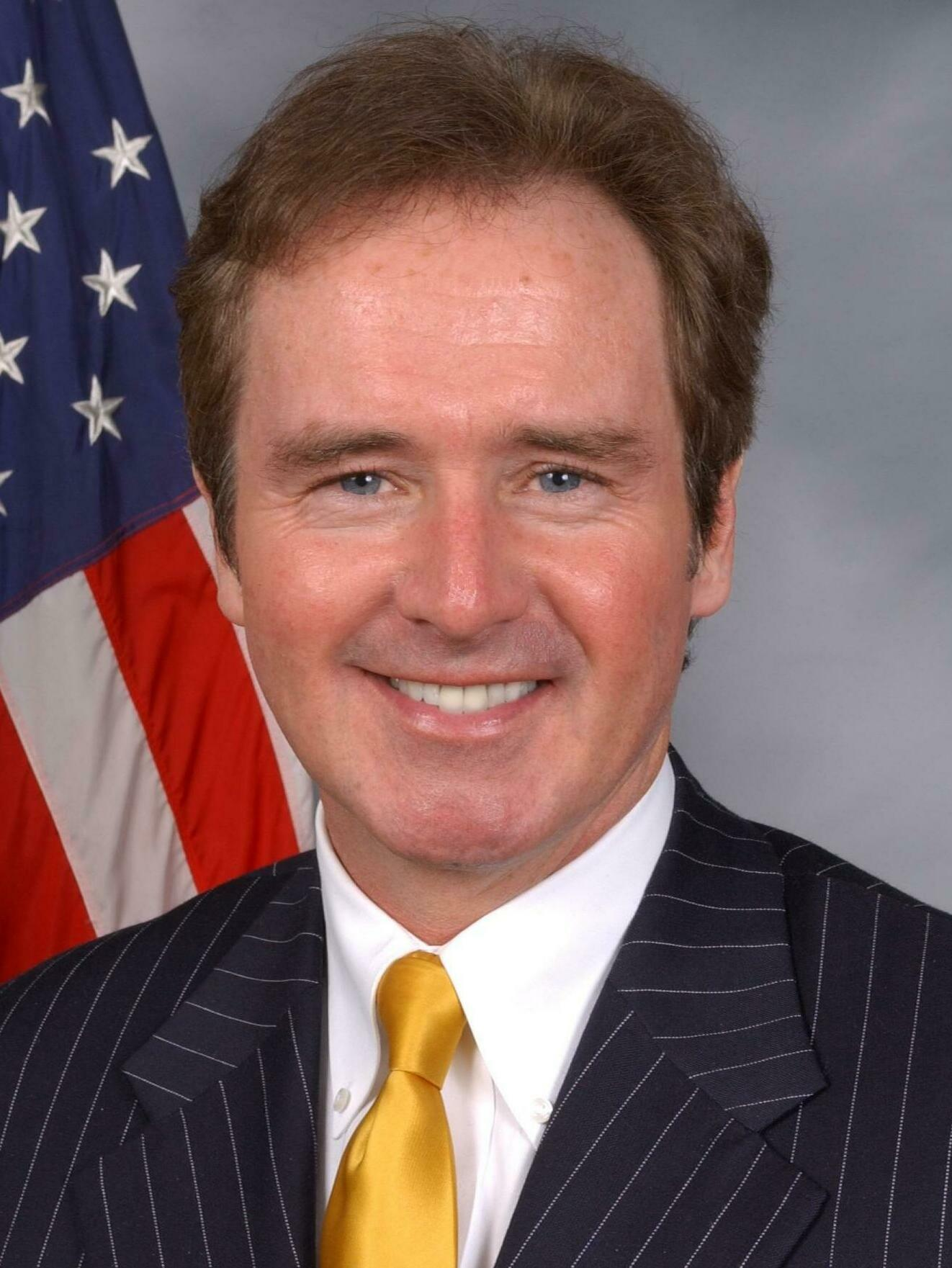
Nominee	Brian Higgins	Daniel Humiston
Party	Democratic	Republican
Alliance	Working Families	Conservative
Popular vote	185,713	56,354
Percentage	74.4%	22.6%
- County results Higgins: 60–70% 70–80%
Representative before election
Brian Higgins
Democratic
Elected Representative
Brian Higgins
Democratic

Democrat Brian Higgins easily defeated Independence Party candidate Dan Humiston. The Republicans did not put forth a candidate, instead cross-endorsing Humiston. Higgins won the general election.

=== Predictions ===
Source	Ranking	As of
The Cook Political Report	Safe D	November 6, 2008
Rothenberg	Safe D	November 2, 2008
Sabato's Crystal Ball	Safe D	November 6, 2008
Real Clear Politics	Safe D	November 7, 2008
CQ Politics	Safe D	November 6, 2008

== District 28 ==
2008 New York's 28th congressional district election
- November 4, 2008
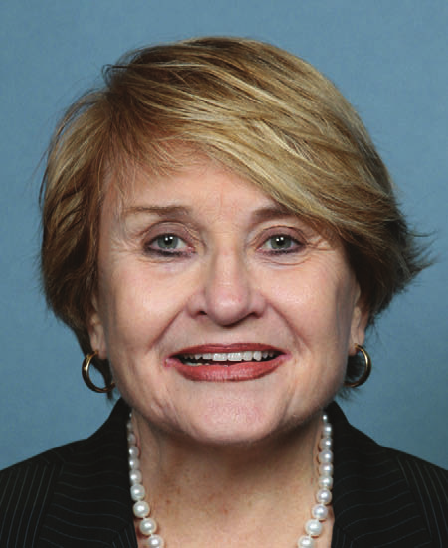

Nominee	Louise Slaughter	David Crimmen
Party	Democratic	Republican
Popular vote	172,592	48,677
Percentage	77.99%	22.00%
- County results Slaughter: 50–60% 60–70% 70–80% 80–90%
U.S. Representative before election
Louise Slaughter
Democratic
Elected U.S. Representative
Louise Slaughter
Democratic

=== Predictions ===
Source	Ranking	As of
The Cook Political Report	Safe D	November 6, 2008
Rothenberg	Safe D	November 2, 2008
Sabato's Crystal Ball	Safe D	November 6, 2008
Real Clear Politics	Safe D	November 7, 2008
CQ Politics	Safe D	November 6, 2008

== District 29 ==
2008 New York's 29th congressional district election
- November 4, 2008
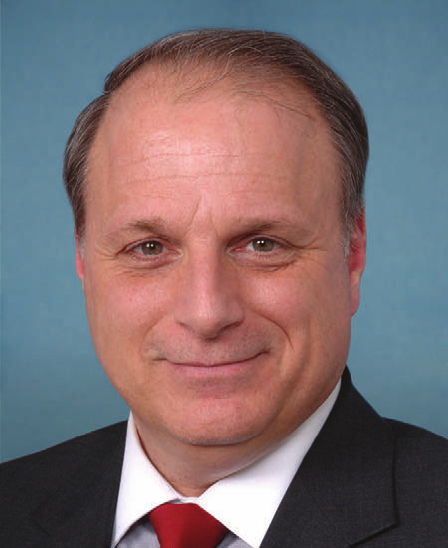

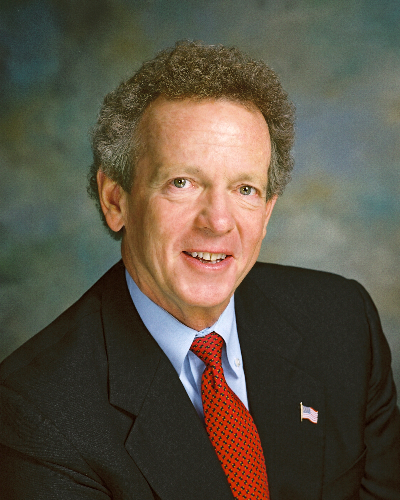
Nominee	Eric Massa	Randy Kuhl
Party	Democratic	Republican
Popular vote	140,483	135,160
Percentage	50.96%	49.03%
- County results Massa: 50–60% Kuhl: 50–60%
U.S. Representative before election
Randy Kuhl
Republican
Elected U.S. Representative
Eric Massa
Democratic

Democratic nominee Eric Massa defeated Republican incumbent Randy Kuhl, following his unsuccessful 2006 run against Kuhl.

Two-term incumbent Randy Kuhl (R) had been elected to Congress with 52% of the popular vote over Democratic candidate Eric Massa in a two-way race in 2006. In March 2006, citing his frustration with actions at the in-patient mental health care hospital at the Canandaigua VA center, former Democratic candidate, and a long-time friend of 2004 presidential candidate General Wesley Clark, Eric J.J. Massa filed to run as the Democratic candidate again in 2008. In May 2007, Pittsford businessman David Nachbar, a senior vice-president of Bausch & Lomb, also announced his candidacy as a Democratic candidate for the same seat. As of a post on April 18, 2007, from Massa on DailyKos, the DCCC placed a requirement on their support for any candidate relied upon that candidate having $300K cash-on-hand by the end of the second quarter 2007 (June 30). In August 2007, Nachbar announced that he was withdrawing from the race, with news reports stating that a letter to supporters suggest his role as Senior VP of Human Resources for Bausch & Lomb during a buyout via hedge fund Warburg Pinkus rendered him unable to campaign effectively. Prior to Nachbar's announcement, Massa's campaign announced in a press release, that he had received all of the County endorsements of the 29th District and all of the townships in Monroe County, but had yet to secure the Monroe Democratic Committee endorsement.

A native of the 29th District, Congressman Randy Kuhl has lived in the area all of his life. The son of a doctor and a nurse/teacher, Randy was born in Bath, picked grapes and worked inside the wineries on the shores of Keuka Lake, attended school in Hammondsport, had summer jobs in construction and on several different farms during his college years. He owned and operated a business in Bath, became Steuben County attorney, then successfully ran for the New York State Assembly in 1980, the New York State Senate in 1986, and the U.S. House of Representatives in 2004 where he now serves and represents the people of the 29th District. Randy Kuhl is a graduate of Hammondsport Central School, and earned a B.S. in Civil Engineering from Union College (1966), and in 1969 received his Juris Doctor from Syracuse University College of Law. He is a communicant of St. James Episcopal Church and has been active in the Hammondsport Rotary Club and BPOE 1547 in Bath. He is a member of the Advisory Committee of the Five Rivers Council of the Boy Scouts of America, the Branchport Rod and Gun Club, and the executive committee of the Steuben County Republican Committee. He is President of the Board of Directors of the Reginald Wood Scouting Memorial and an immediate past member of the Board of Directors of the Alliance for Manufacturing and Technology. Randy Kuhl currently lives in Hammondsport and is the father of three sons.

Eric Massa was the Democratic nominee in 2006. He attended the U.S. Naval Academy at Annapolis and went on to serve in the Navy for 24 years. He eventually served as aide to former NATO Supreme Allied Commander, General Wesley Clark. Near the end of his Navy career he was diagnosed with Non-Hodgkin lymphoma, a disease he was able to survive. A former Republican, he claims he left his party over the issue of the Iraq War and campaigned in New Hampshire during the campaign of his former-boss, Wesley Clark's, failed presidential bid. During the 2006 campaign, Massa positioned himself as strongly opposed to the Iraq war and unrestricted "free trade," favoring instead "fair trade". Other issues in his platform included expanding farm aid programs, as well as bringing homeland security money to the 29th District. Massa is also active in Band of Brothers/Veterans for a Secure America whose goal is to help veterans who are running for Congress as Democrats. Massa has recently worked as a "business consultant" for Strategic Insight, a defense consulting firm in Alexandra, Virginia. Massa, during a press conference in June, 2007, stated that he has since "curtailed all other activities in April (2007) when he became an active candidate". Massa lives in Corning, New York, with his wife Beverly, daughter Alexandra and son Justin. His eldest son Richard lives in California.

David Nachbar is Bausch & Lomb's senior vice president for Human Resources. He was named to this post in October 2002. Nachbar joined Bausch & Lomb from The St. Paul Companies, Inc., where he was senior vice president for Human Resources. Previously, he was vice president for Human Resources and chief of staff for Asia for Citibank. He also held Human Resources posts with PepsiCo and Time Warner. In 1996, Nachbar ran for New York State Senate as a Democrat and was unsuccessful. Nachbar received a Bachelor of Science degree in Industrial and Labor Relations from Cornell University in 1984.

On August 21, 2008, Massa attended a Kuhl press conference in the Corning City Hall. After the press conference ended, the two candidates spoke for a minute in the hallway. Massa challenged Kuhl to schedule debates and criticized him for not having accepted debate invitations from community leaders. After Massa left, Kuhl said he had not had time to schedule a debate. Kuhl later issued a press release which criticized Massa for being "disrespectful" at the event, which Kuhl said "was not campaign related". Councilman Dane Kane, a Democrat who also attended the press conference, joined in Massa's criticism, saying, "Kuhl has stopped his town hall meetings, won't take questions from the public, and refuses to respond to invitations to debate the issues of the day."

=== Predictions ===
Source	Ranking	As of
The Cook Political Report	Tossup	November 6, 2008
Rothenberg	Tilt D (flip)	November 2, 2008
Sabato's Crystal Ball	Lean D (flip)	November 6, 2008
Real Clear Politics	Tossup	November 7, 2008
CQ Politics	Lean D (flip)	November 6, 2008
