= Phil Whitlock =

Phil Whitlock may refer to:

- Phil Whitlock (footballer) (1930–2009), Welsh footballer
- Phil Whitlock (squash player) (born 1962), English squash player

== See also ==
- Whitlock (surname)
