= Oakwood Heights =

Oakwood Heights may refer to the following locations:

- Oakwood Heights (Detroit)
- Oakwood, Staten Island
- Oakwood Heights (Staten Island Railway station)
