= Whitelock =

Whitelock is a surname and place name.

== People ==
- Thomas Whitelock Kempthorne (1834–1915), New Zealand manufacturing chemist and businessman
- Henry Whitelock Torrens (1806–1852), son of Major Henry Torrens
- Adam Whitelock (born 1987), New Zealand rugby union footballer
- Dorothy Whitelock (1901–1982), English historian
- George Whitelock (born 1986), rugby union player
- Loran Whitelock, American botanist who specializes in Cycads
- Luke Whitelock (born 1991), New Zealand rugby union footballer
- Sam Whitelock (born 1988), New Zealand born rugby player

== Places ==
- Reservoir Hill, Baltimore, a residential neighborhood in Baltimore, Maryland, USA, which is also known as Whitelock

== See also ==
- Uncle John & Whitelock, 'horror blues' band from Glasgow
- Whitelocke
- Whitlock (disambiguation)
