= Bay Terrace, New York =

Bay Terrace, New York may refer to:

- Bay Terrace, Queens, a neighborhood in Queens, New York
- Bay Terrace, Staten Island, a neighborhood in Staten Island, New York
  - Bay Terrace (Staten Island Railway station)
