= Bay Terrace, Staten Island =

Neighborhood in New York City

Coordinates: 40°32′49″N 74°08′41″W

Bay Terrace is a neighborhood, centered around the street of the same name, on the East Shore of Staten Island, one of the five boroughs of New York City. It is part of New York City's 51st City Council district and is represented in the New York City Council by Frank Morano.

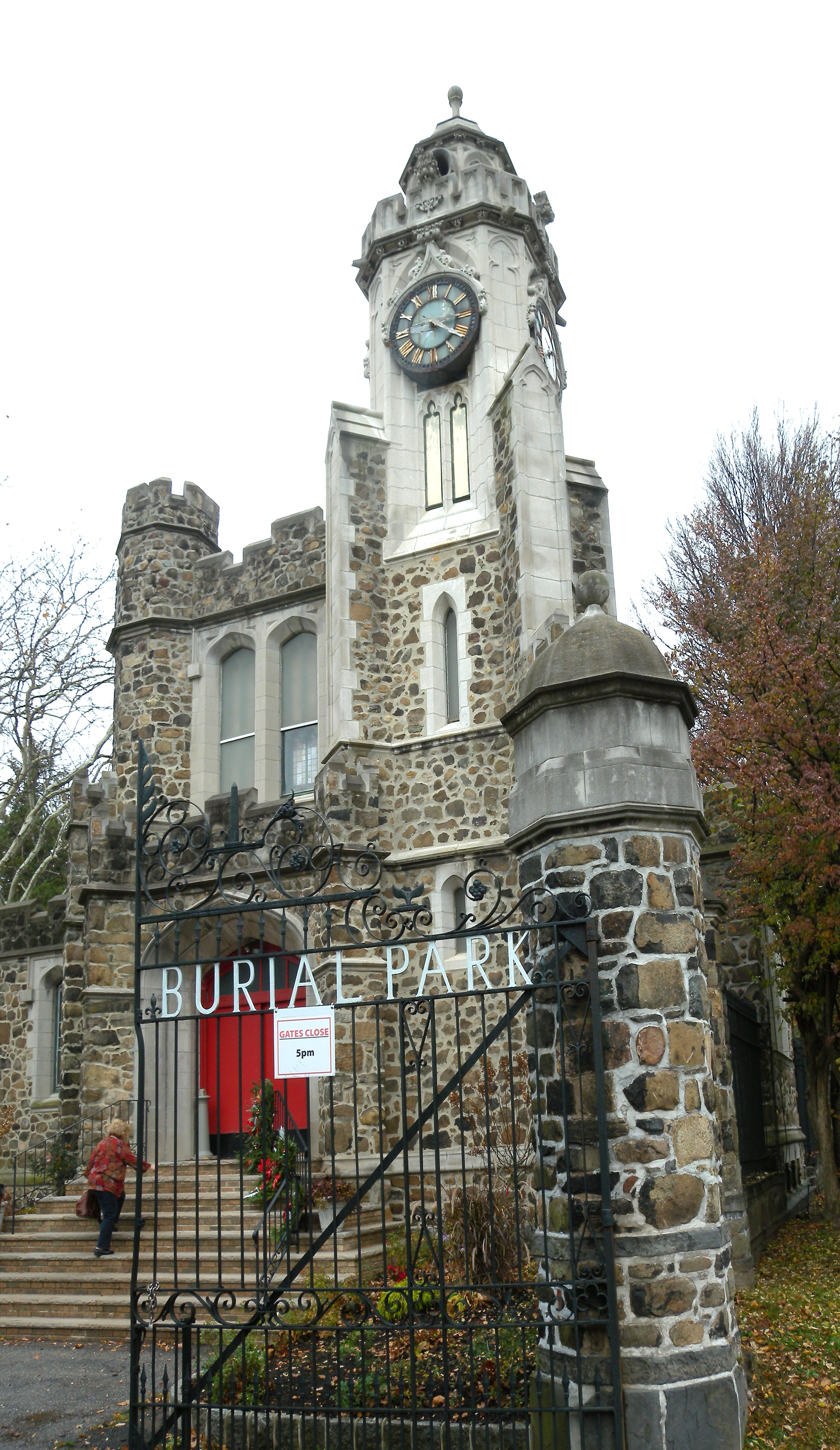
Ocean View Burial Park

Bay Terrace is bordered by Richmondtown to the north, Oakwood to the east, Great Kills to the west, and the Great Kills Harbor to the south.

== History ==
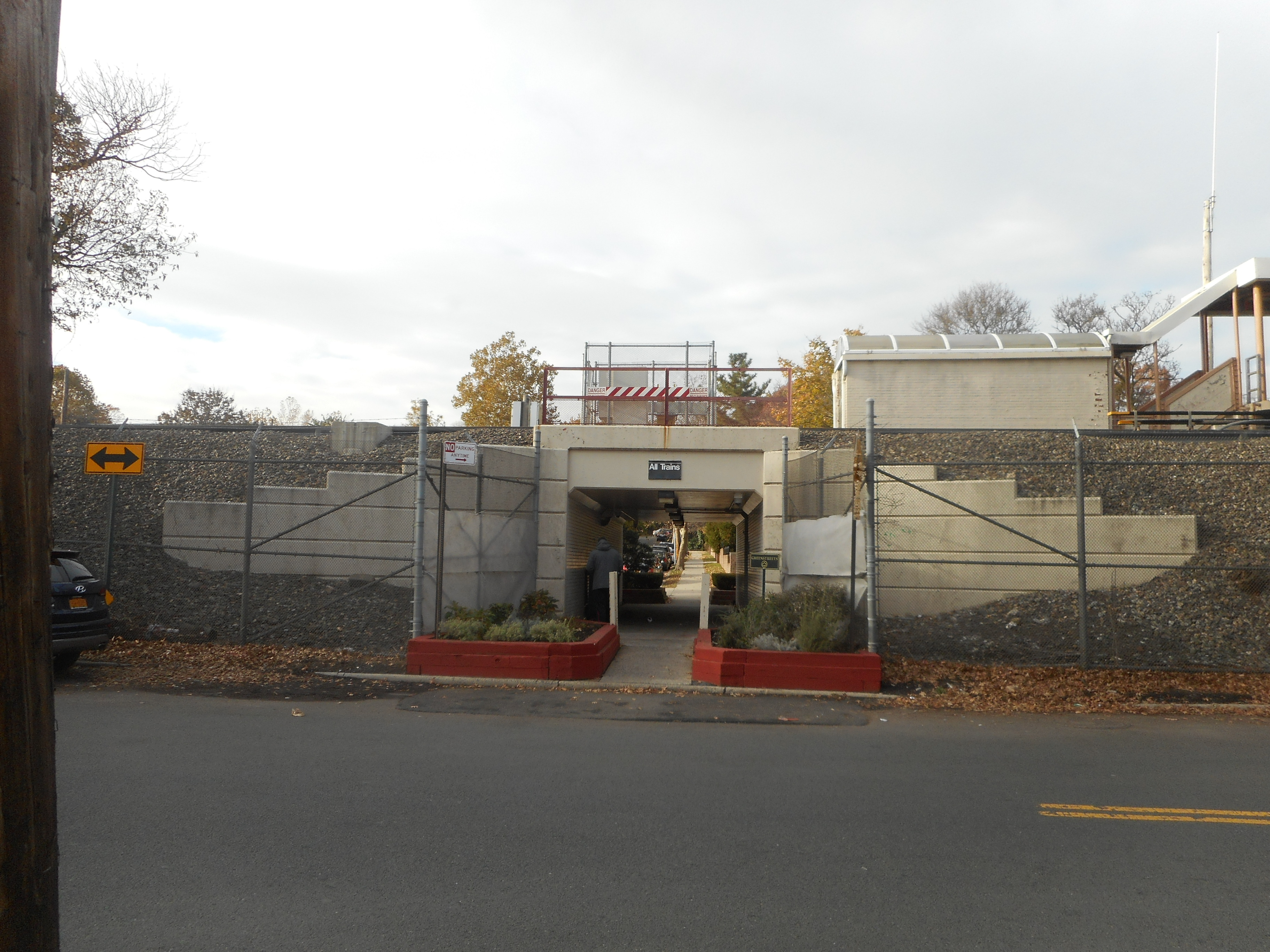
The street originally named "Bay Terrace Avenue." which is bisected by the Staten Island Railway main line.

Formerly known as Whitlock, the community's main thoroughfare was originally named Bay Terrace Avenue; however, by the late 1940s the word "Avenue" had been dropped and the street's name became simply Bay Terrace. The vicinity around the street was largely undeveloped until the late 1950s, when single-family home construction began there; the area itself then acquired the name of Bay Terrace, which may refer to its flat, ramp like terrain, which gradually slopes downward to the east until reaching the Lower New York Bay in Great Kills Park.

In the 1970s many Jewish families from Brooklyn and Queens settled in Bay Terrace, providing a significant demographic contrast with the surrounding communities, whose populations are still largely Italian-American, though they are becoming increasingly Russian-American as well. In recent years, many new commercial establishments — most notably a large shopping center built on the site of a former swim club — have sprung up to serve the area's growing population. Part of Oceanview Cemetery, originally established by the Lutheran Church but open to those of all faiths, is considered to be in Bay Terrace, which is regarded by many Staten Island geographers as the southernmost neighborhood of the East Shore, the South Shore beginning with Great Kills, which lies immediately to the south.

== Demographics ==
For census purposes, the New York City Department of City Planning classifies Bay Terrace as part of a larger Neighborhood Tabulation Area called Oakwood-Richmondtown SI0301. This neighborhood had 22,388 inhabitants based on data from the 2020 United States Census. This was an increase of 339 persons (1.5%) from the 22,049 counted in 2010. The neighborhood had a population density of 17.0 inhabitants per acre (14,500/sq mi; 5,600/km2).

The racial makeup of the neighborhood was 72.9% (16,322) White (Non-Hispanic), 2.6% (581) Black (Non-Hispanic), 10.6% (2,366) Asian, 2.7% (596) from some other race or from two or more races. Hispanic or Latino of any race were 11.3% (2,523) of the population.

According to the 2020 United States Census, this area has many cultural communities of over 1,000 inhabitants. These groups are residents who identify as Puerto Rican, Chinese, German, Irish, and Italian.

Most inhabitants are higher-aged adults: 23.1% are between 50-64 years old. 72.4% of the households had at least one family present. Out of the 8,202 households, 51.3% had a married couple (19.9% with a child under 18), 3.9% had a cohabiting couple (1.5% with a child under 18), 16.0% had a single male (1.4% with a child under 18), and 28.8% had a single female (3.8% with a child under 18). 30.3% of households had children. In this neighborhood, 34.3% of non-vacant housing units are renter-occupied.

== Politics ==
Bay Terrace is part of New York City's 51st City Council district and is currently represented by Frank Morano in the New York City Council.

== Famous residents ==
Ron Thal, a hard rock guitar player who is a former member of Guns N' Roses lived in the area from his childhood through his mid 20s.

== Transportation ==
Bay Terrace is served by the Staten Island Railway station with the same name. Bay Terrace is also served by various buses along Hylan Boulevard. It is served by the S78 and S79 SBS local buses, as well as the SIM1, SIM5, SIM6, SIM7 and SIM10 express buses.
