= Whitlock =

Whitlock may refer to:

== Places ==
- Whitlock, Tennessee, United States, an unincorporated community
- Whitlock Valley, Arizona, United States
- Whitlock Island, Western Australia
- Whitlock, original name of Bay Terrace station, a railway station in Bay Terrace, Staten Island, New York, United States
- Whitlock's End, a hamlet in Dickens Heath parish, West Midlands, England
  - Whitlocks End railway station

== People ==
- Whitlock (surname), people with the surname
- Whitlock Nicoll (1786–1838), English physician

== Businesses ==
- Whitlock (manufacturing), a former London-based carriage and automobile manufacturer
- F. Whitlock & Sons Ltd, pickle and sauce manufacturers
