= Whillock =

Whillock is a surname. Notable people with the surname include:

- H. W. Whillock (1904–1992), American politician
- Jack Whillock (1942–2021), American baseball player

== See also ==
- Whitlock (surname)
- Willock
