= East Shore, Staten Island =

Area in New York City

Coordinates: 40.58°N 74.09°W

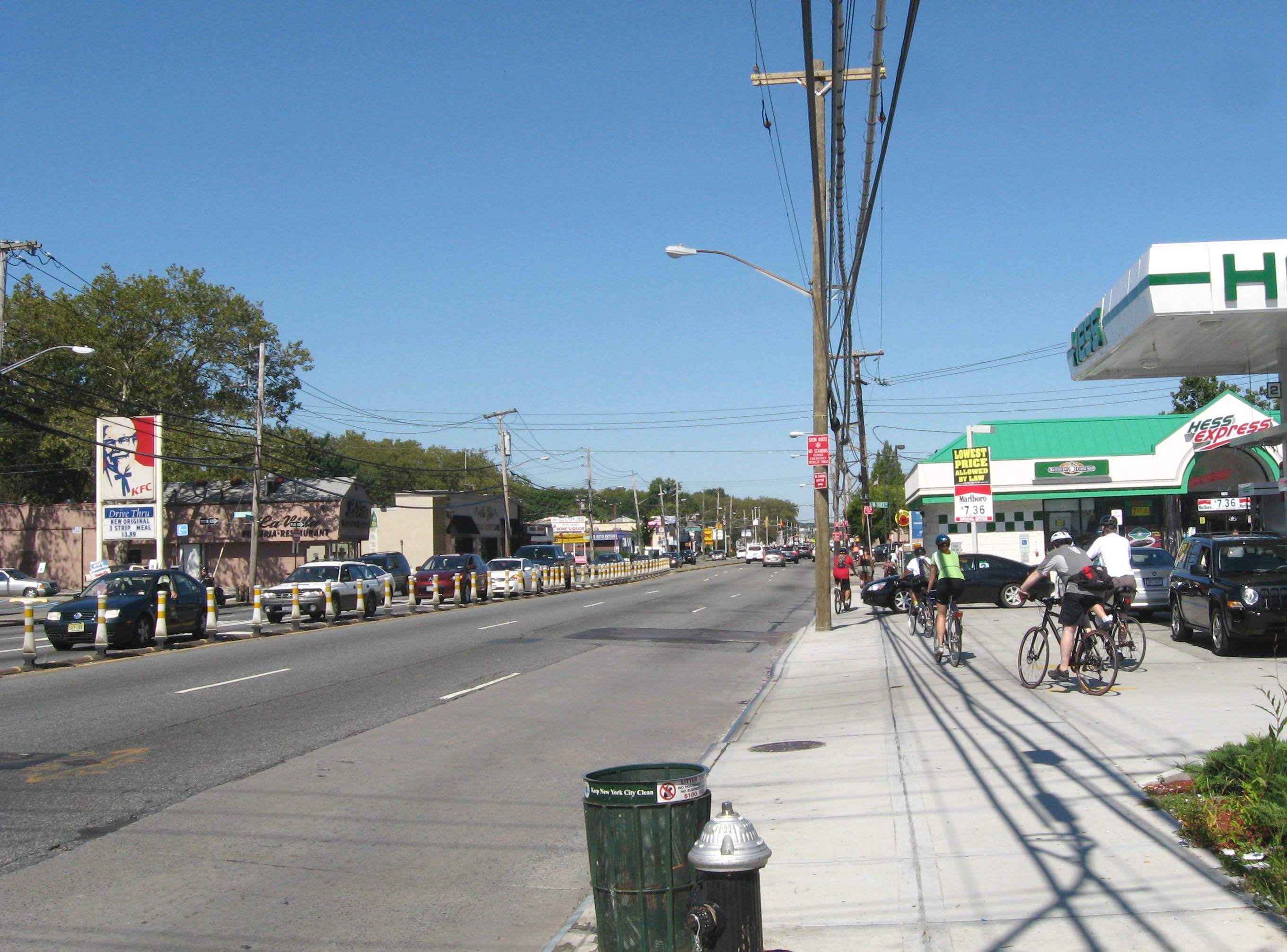
Hylan Boulevard in the New Dorp neighborhood

The term East Shore is frequently applied to a series of neighborhoods along the Lower New York Bay and the Raritan Bay and within New York City's borough of Staten Island.

== Location ==
Precise parameters vary, but the most commonly used definition of the East Shore is that it stretches from the Verrazzano–Narrows Bridge and the Staten Island Expressway, or some line slightly south of this, on the north, to the southern property lines of the Staten Island Unit of the Gateway National Recreation Area (formerly known as Great Kills Park) and United Hebrew Cemetery on the south, and from the Lower New York Bay on the east to the western boundaries of ZIP Codes 10304, 10305 and 10306, on the west.

Not only the term "East Shore," but the very concept is often attributed to New York Telephone's East Shore Central Office (now officially known as the East Staten Island Central Office), which has served this part of the island since the 1920s (the northern boundary of this office's territory is situated, on average, about ¾ mile south of the Staten Island Expressway, built in the early 1960s). Such Staten Island neighborhoods as Arrochar, South Beach, Grasmere, Dongan Hills, Grant City, Midland Beach, New Dorp, Oakwood, Old Town, Richmondtown, and Bay Terrace, along with part of Todt Hill, are usually reckoned as belonging to the East Shore, although all of Arrochar and most of South Beach and Grasmere do not qualify using the telephone company's criteria. Sometimes the communities of Rosebank, Shore Acres, and Fort Wadsworth are also described as East Shore neighborhoods.

== History ==
Like all of Staten Island except for the North Shore, the East Shore was mostly farmland until residential home construction burgeoned after World War II. Many small, one-family homes sprung up on the East Shore in the 1950s, with the rate of new home construction accelerating rapidly after the Verrazzano–Narrows Bridge, which links Staten Island with Brooklyn, opened in November 1964. The opening of the bridge brought a wave of transplants from Brooklyn, especially from neighborhoods such as Flatbush, which many white (especially Italian-American) families sought to leave because African-Americans were relocating there from the Southern States. This factor has contributed to the East Shore becoming the most politically conservative locality on Staten Island, and for that matter, in all of New York City. Since the early 2000s the trend has been for white Americans of Eastern European ancestry to immigrate to the community. Today, thriving communities of Russians, Poles, and Albanians exist on the East Shore. The area is currently not only Italian-American and Irish-American, but Russian-American, Polish-American, and Albanian-American. There is also an emerging Chinese-American population, centered in Arrochar.

The East Shore of Staten Island was devastated by Hurricane Sandy. It is the location of one of the first programs for managed retreat.

== Places of interest ==
The commercial core of the East Shore can be found in New Dorp, at the region's geographic center, which is close to New Dorp Lane. Hylan Boulevard, a major commercial boulevard, connects all the East Shore neighborhoods with each other. Points of interest located on the East Shore include Historic Richmond Town, the nearby Tibetan Museum on Lighthouse Hill, Moravian Cemetery (where members of the Vanderbilt family are buried) and a significant portion of the Staten Island Greenbelt.

The East Shore Seawall, also known as Staten Island Multi-Use Elevated Promenade, is 5.2 miles (8.4 km) long combined seawall and walkway proposed for the East Shore. It would run along the Narrows and Lower New York Bay between Fort Wadsworth at the north and Great Kills Park to the south.

== See also ==
- South Shore, Staten Island
