= Great Kills, Staten Island =

Neighborhood in New York City

Great Kills
- Neighborhood of Staten Island
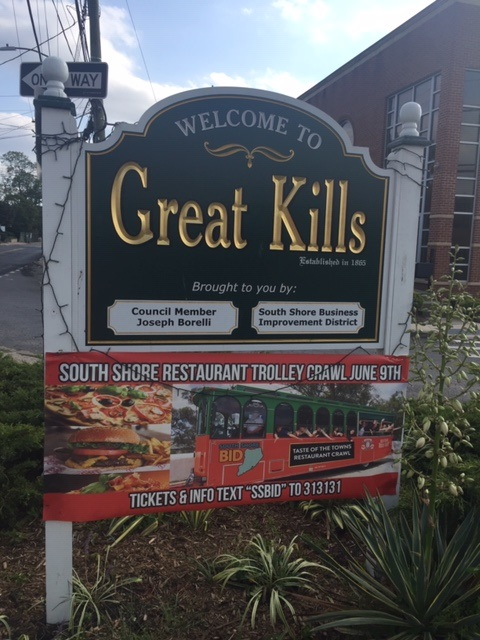
- "Welcome to Great Kills" sign on Amboy Road
- Interactive map of Great Kills
- Coordinates: 40.550°N 74.151°W
- Country: United States
- State: New York
- City: New York City
- Borough: Staten Island
- Community District: Staten Island 3

Area
  - Total: 3.25 sq mi (8.4 km^{2})

Population (2020)
  - Total: 54,699
  - Density: 12,500/sq mi (4,800/km^{2})
- Time zone: UTC−5 (Eastern)
- ZIP Codes: 10308, 10306
- Area code: 718, 347, 929, and 917

Great Kills is a neighborhood within the borough of Staten Island in New York City. It is located on the island's South Shore, and according to many local geographers, it is the South Shore's northernmost community. It is bordered by Richmondtown to the north, Bay Terrace to the east, Eltingville to the west, and Great Kills Harbor to the south.

Kill is an archaic Dutch word with various popular translations, including "creek" and "channel". Indeed, many small streams dot the neighborhood, and the name can be interpreted as meaning that a great number of such streams can be found there.

As of 2021, the neighborhood is represented in the New York State Senate by Great Kills resident Andrew Lanza, in the New York State Assembly by Michael Reilly and Michael Tannousis, and in the New York City Council by Joseph Borelli. All four are members of the Republican Party.

Great Kills is part of Staten Island Community District 3, and its ZIP Codes are 10308 and a small part of 10306. The neighborhood is patrolled by the 122nd Precinct of the New York City Police Department.

== History ==
The eastern half of what has been known since 1865 as Great Kills was originally named Clarendon after a British colonial governor, and the western half was named Newtown. For a time, both were known as Giffords, after Daniel Gifford, a local commissioner and surveyor. The name survives in Giffords Lane and Giffords Glen, which are adjacent to the Great Kills train station that was formerly named Giffords, and also in the Gifford School, P.S. 32. The term "Great Kills" traces back informally at least to 1664, the final year of the Dutch colony of New Amsterdam, when French settler Jacques Guyon called the area "La Grand Kills".

From the 1680s when English colonial government was organized, until 1898 when Staten Island consolidated into New York City, eastern Great Kills was officially part of the town of Southfield, Richmond County, New York, and western Great Kills was officially part of Westfield. Great Kills and Staten Island's other East Shore neighborhoods were mostly rural and dotted with shoreline resorts until the 1950s, after which the Verrazzano–Narrows Bridge brought heavy residential growth from Brooklyn.

The 17th-century Poillon-Seguine-Britton House near Great Kills Harbor was added to the National Register of Historic Places in 1984, but was burned in 1989 and demolished in 1996. The American Institute of Aeronautics and Astronautics selected what is now Great Kills Park as a "Historic Aerospace Site" in 2006, to commemorate a pioneering rocket launch in 1933.

== Demographics ==
For census purposes, the New York City Department of City Planning classifies Great Kills as part of a larger Neighborhood Tabulation Area called Great Kills-Eltingville SI0302. This designated neighborhood had 54,699 inhabitants based on data from the 2020 United States Census. This was an increase of 1,831 persons (3.5%) from the 52,868 counted in 2010. The neighborhood had a population density of 19.7 inhabitants per acre.

The racial makeup of the neighborhood was 79.7% (43,582) White (Non-Hispanic), 0.6% (316) Black (Non-Hispanic), 7.5% (4,076) Asian, 2.1% (1,154) from some other race or from two or more races. Hispanic or Latino of any race were 10.2% (5,571) of the population.

According to the 2020 United States Census, this area has many cultural communities of over 1,000 inhabitants. These groups are residents who identify as Puerto Rican, English, Polish, Russian, Chinese, German, Irish, Egyptian, and Italian.

Most inhabitants are higher-aged adults: 29% are between 45-64 years old. 72.9% of the households had at least one family present. Out of the 19,994 households, 55.3% had a married couple (21.0% with a child under 18), 3.9% had a cohabiting couple (1.1% with a child under 18), 14.6% had a single male (1.0% with a child under 18), and 26.2% had a single female (3.3% with a child under 18). 29.9% of households had children. In this neighborhood, 22.9% of non-vacant housing units are renter-occupied.

The entirety of Community District 3, which comprises Great Kills and other South Shore neighborhoods, had 159,132 inhabitants as of NYC Health's 2018 Community Health Profile, with an average life expectancy of 81.3 years at birth. This is about the same as the life expectancy of 81.2 for all New York City neighborhoods. Most inhabitants are youth and middle-aged adults: 21% are between the ages of 0 and 17, 26% between 25 and 44, and 29% between 45 and 64. The ratio of college-aged and elderly residents was lower, at 8% and 16% respectively.

As of 2017, the median household income in Community District 3 was $96,796. In 2018, an estimated 11% of South Shore residents lived in poverty, compared to 17% in all of Staten Island and 20% in all of New York City. On average during 2012–2016, one in sixteen South Shore residents (6%) were unemployed, compared to 6% in Staten Island and 9% in New York City. Rent burden, or the percentage of renters who paid more than 30% of their income for housing, was 42% for the South Shore, compared to the boroughwide and citywide rates of 49% and 51%, respectively. As of 2018, Great Kills and the South Shore were considered middle- to high-income relative to the rest of the city, and not gentrifying.

== Political representation ==
In the United States House of Representatives, Great Kills is located within New York's 11th congressional district, represented by Republican Nicole Malliotakis, a former resident of the neighborhood. Great Kills is part of the 24th State Senate district, represented by Republican Andrew Lanza, and the 62nd and 64th State Assembly districts, represented respectively by Republicans Michael Reilly and Michael Tannousis. In the New York City Council, Great Kills is part of District 51, represented by Republican Frank Morano.

== Police and crime ==
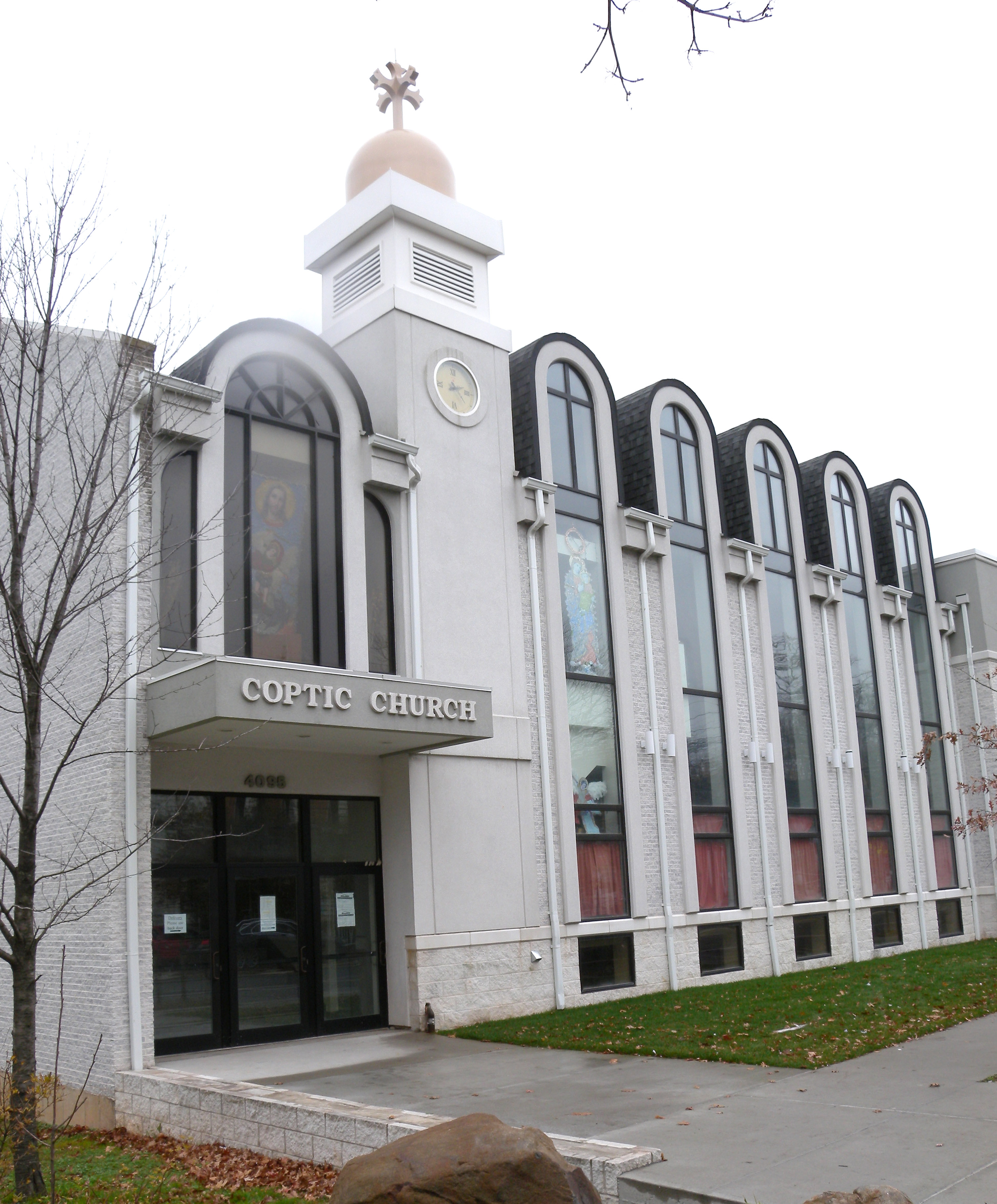
Coptic Church

Great Kills is patrolled by the 122nd Precinct of the NYPD, after shifting out of the 123rd when Staten Island's precinct maps were redrawn on July 1, 2013. The neighborhoods represented by these two precincts were the two safest (out of 69) in a 2010 study of New York's per-capita crime statistics. With a non-fatal assault rate of 25 per 100,000 people (2012–2014), the South Shore's rate of violent crimes per capita was less than half that of the city as a whole. The incarceration rate of 193 per 100,000 people (2015–2016) was also less than half that of the city as a whole. The rate of licensed gun ownership was among the city's highest in the 2010 study, as was the rate of opioid abuse.

Like most of New York City, the 122nd Precinct has a substantially lower crime rate than in the 1990s, with crimes across all categories having decreased by 88% between 1990 and 2022. The precinct reported one murder, eight rapes, 63 robberies, 128 felony assaults, 91 burglaries, 373 grand larcenies, and 136 grand larcenies auto in 2022.

== Fire safety ==
Great Kills is served by the New York City Fire Department (FDNY) Engine Company 162, Ladder Company 82, and Battalion 23, located at 256 Nelson Avenue.

== Health ==
Preterm and teenage births are less common in Great Kills and the South Shore than in other places citywide. For the South Shore in 2015, there were 77 preterm births per 1,000 live births (compared to 87 per 1,000 citywide), and 3.6 teenage births per 1,000 live births (compared to 19.3 per 1,000 citywide). The South Shore has a relatively low percentage of residents who are uninsured. The population of uninsured adults was estimated to be 4%, less than the citywide rate of 12%, though this was based on a small sample size in 2015–2016.

The concentration of fine particulate matter, the deadliest type of air pollutant, was 0.0066 milligrams per cubic metre (6.6×10^{−9} oz/ft^{3}) for the South Shore, 12% less than the city average. In 2015–2016, 17% of South Shore adults were smokers, which was higher than the city average of 14%. For the South Shore, 26% of adults were obese, 9% were diabetic, and 22% had high blood pressure—compared to the citywide averages of 24%, 11%, and 28%, respectively. In addition, 17% of children were obese, compared to the citywide average of 20%.

Ninety-five percent of South Shore adults ate some fruits and vegetables every day, which was more than the city's average of 87%. In 2015–2016, 88% of adults described their health as "good", "very good", or "excellent", more than the city's average of 78%. For every supermarket on the South Shore, there were 4 bodegas. During late 2020, Great Kills spent weeks with the highest coronavirus rate of any New York City ZIP Code, and in the center of a State-designated "Orange Zone" cluster of cases.

The nearest major hospital is Staten Island University Hospital South Campus in Prince's Bay.

== Post office and ZIP Codes ==
Great Kills generally is coextensive with the ZIP Code 10308, which the United States Postal Service serves from its Great Kills Station at 1 Nelson Avenue. A small portion of ZIP Code 10306, between Amboy Road and Siedenburg Park, is sometimes considered part of the Great Kills neighborhood.

== Education ==
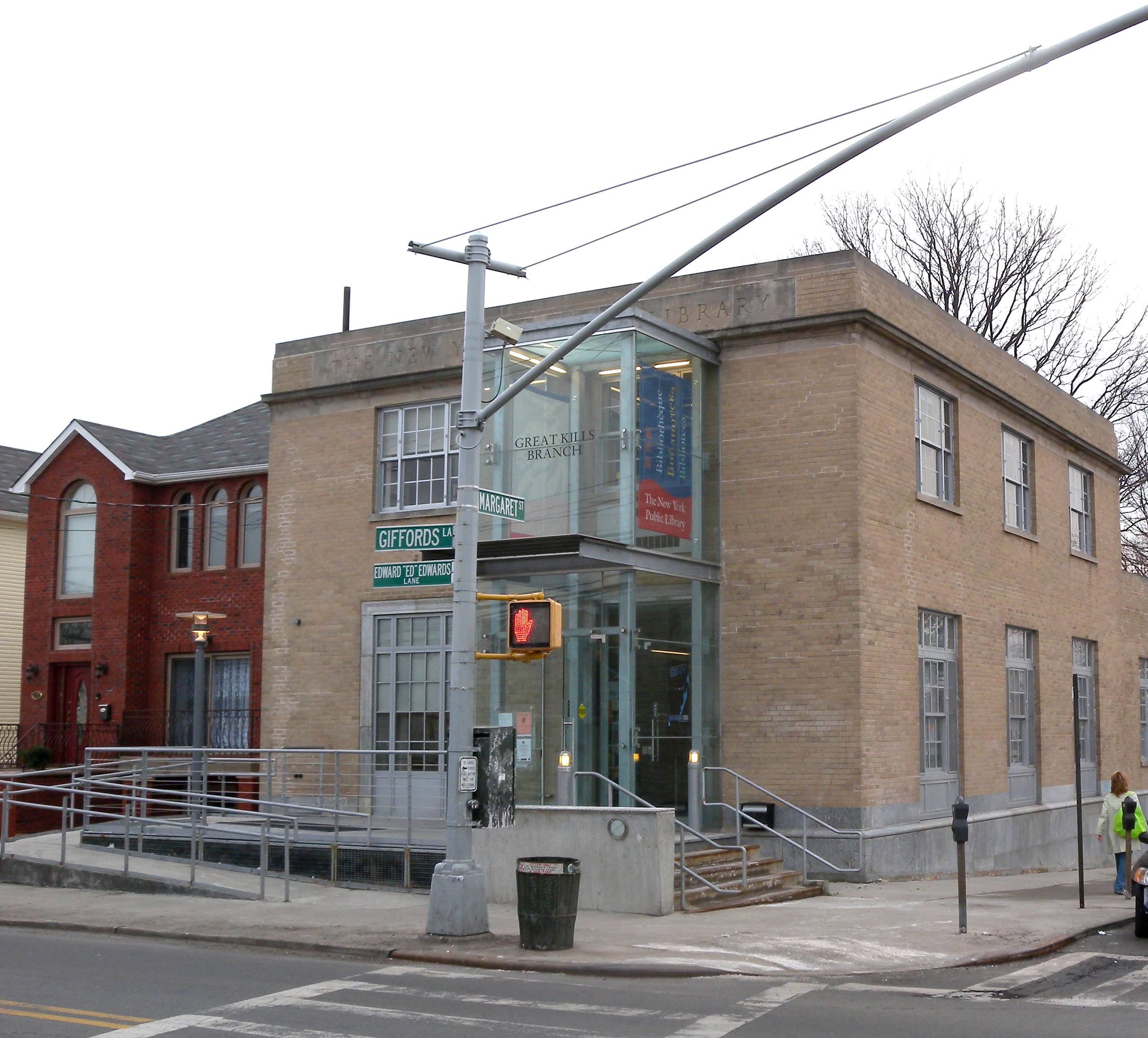
New York Public Library, Great Kills branch

Great Kills and the South Shore generally have a similar rate of college-educated residents to the rest of the city. While 41% of South Shore residents of age 25+ had a college education or higher in 2012–2016, 8% had less than a high school education and 51% were high school graduates or had some college education. Citywide, 43% of adults had a college education or higher. The percentage of South Shore students achieving at grade level in math rose from 48% in 2000 to 65% in 2011, though reading achievement declined from 55% to 52% during the same time period.

For the South Shore, 12% of elementary school students were absent for 19 or more days of the 2016–2017 school year, less than the citywide average of 20%. Additionally, 89% of high school students from the South Shore graduated on time, more than the citywide average of 75%.

=== Schools ===
Barnes I.S. 24 in Great Kills is one of Staten Island's public intermediate schools (grades 6–8), named for the local educator and civic activist Myra S. Barnes (1880–1962). Dubbed the "Fighting Lady", she was well known for highlighting Staten Island issues to the New York City government. Firefighter Scott Davidson, lost in the September 11 attacks of 2001, attended I.S. 24, and is one of 29 local victims memorialized by an eternal flame at St. Clare's, the neighborhood's prominent Catholic church and parochial school.

In 2009, The New York Times reported: "The three public schools in Great Kills, two of them elementary schools [P.S. 8 and P.S. 32], are among the best in the city." In 2008, Today's Catholic Teacher magazine selected St. Clare's School as one of twelve nationwide to receive the "Catholic Schools for Tomorrow Award".

=== Libraries ===
The New York Public Library (NYPL) operates two locations nearby. The Great Kills branch is located at 56 Giffords Lane. The branch was opened in 1927 as a one-story building and was replaced by the current three-story building in 1954. Fully renovated in 2005, it currently has a lower level for community events, a first floor for adults, and a second floor for children's collections.

The Richmondtown branch is located at 200 Clarke Avenue, just outside Great Kills. It opened in 1996 and contains two floors: a first floor for adults and a second floor for children.

== Recreation ==
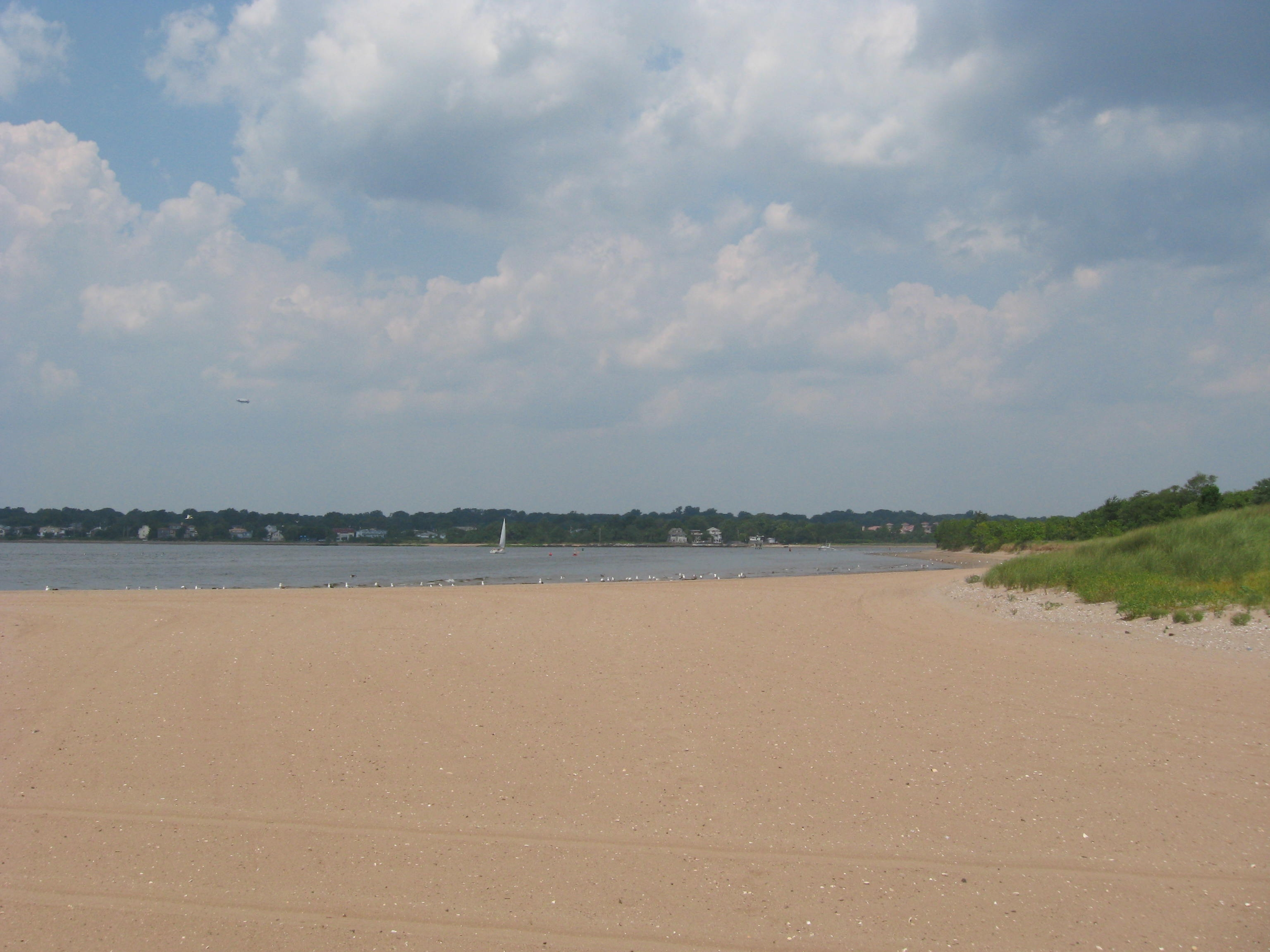
Great Kills Harbor in 2008

The neighborhood is home to the Great Kills Little League, one of eight Little Leagues on Staten Island, and winner of the state baseball championship in 2011. Another thousand neighborhood children participate in sports teams organized through St. Clare's Church and its spin-off Great Kills Soccer Club. St. Clare's cheerleading squad won a Northeast divisional championship in 2016.

Located right beside the Great Kills Little League is the Great Kills Swim Club. This is a private club that belongs to over 500 families and competes in swimming and diving with other swim clubs in the borough. The Great Kills Swim Club is the site of the 2015 movie Staten Island Summer written by comedian Colin Jost, who was a lifeguard there as a teenager. The neighborhood also plays a key role in the 2009 Dutch film Great Kills Road.

Great Kills was the site of the first middleweight boxing championship, when Nonpareil Jack Dempsey defeated George Fulljames in 1884 for the title.

At the southeastern corner of the neighborhood is Great Kills Park, part of the Gateway National Recreation Area. The park includes a beach, trails, fishing and bird-watching areas, sports fields, and the Nichols Marina, with several private marinas nearby. The shorefront has required extensive work after heavy damage from Hurricane Sandy in 2012.

== Transportation ==
Great Kills is served by the Staten Island Railway and numerous local and express buses. The railway serves the neighborhood via the Great Kills station, located at Giffords Lane near Amboy Road. Express train service between Great Kills and the St. George Ferry Terminal is maintained during the morning and evening weekday rush hours, while local trains serve the station 24/7. Local buses are the S54, S74, S78, S79 and S84, and Manhattan express buses are the SIM1, SIM5, SIM6, SIM7, SIM9 and SIM10. Parallel to Amboy Road, the neighborhood's other major commercial streets are Arthur Kill Road and Hylan Boulevard.

== Notable people ==
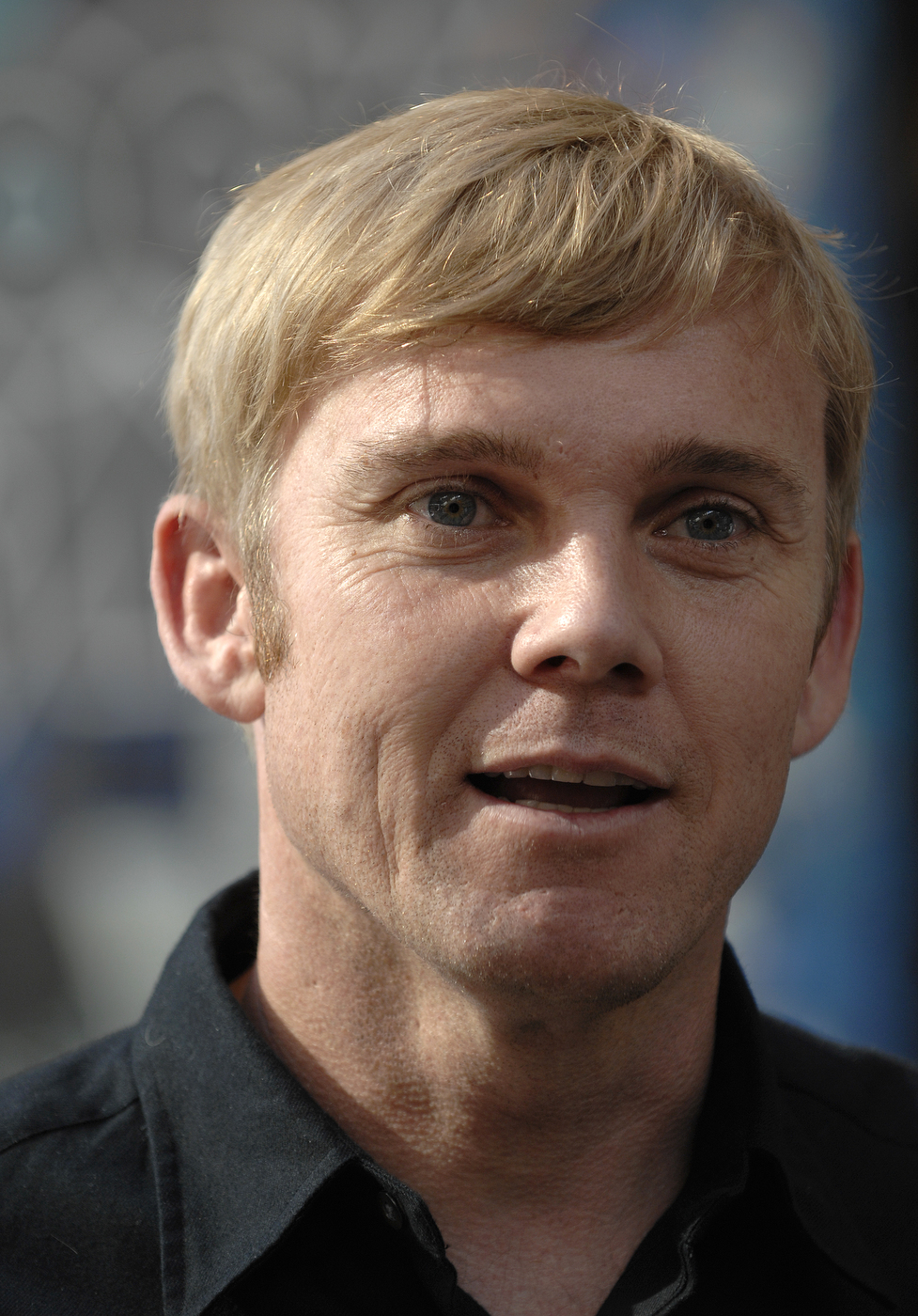
Ricky Schroder

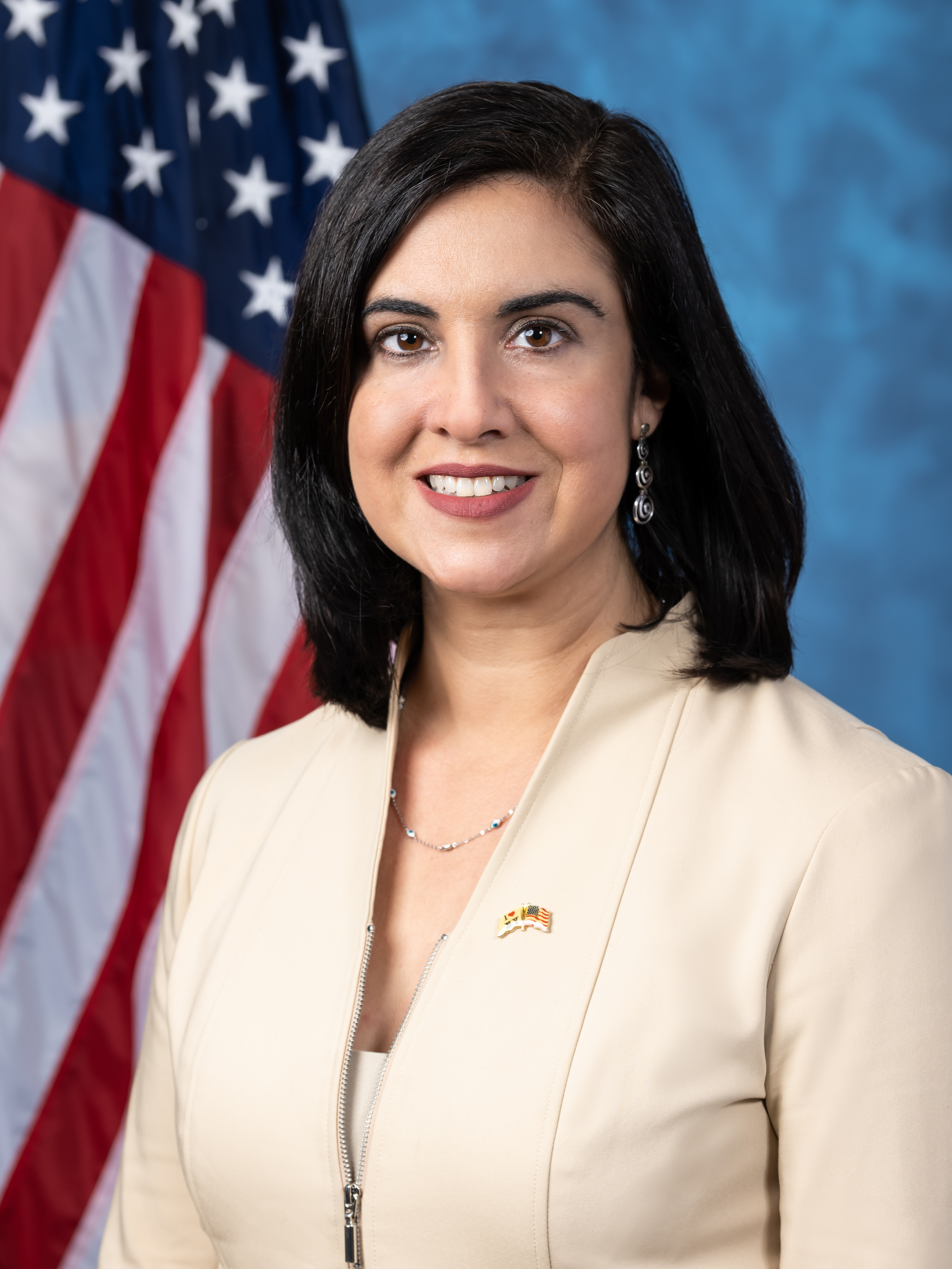
Nicole Malliotakis

People who were born in, residents of, or otherwise closely associated with Great Kills include:

- Stephen Caracappa (1941–2017), detective convicted of eight murders
- Alfred C. Cerullo III (born 1961), politician and actor
- George William Curtis, abolitionist, essayist, novelist and editorial writer for the New York Tribune, Putnam's Monthly and Harpers Weekly
- Roy Clark (1933–2018), country musician, co-host of Hee Haw
- Helen Clevenger (1917–1936), NYU student who was murdered in North Carolina
- Romi Cohn (1929–2020), rabbi, mohel and real estate developer
- Pete Davidson (born 1993), comedian best known for Saturday Night Live
- Edmund J. Dobbin (1935–2015), priest, president of Villanova University
- Joey Faye (born Joseph Antony Palladino, c.1909–1997), comedian
- Vincent Fanelli (1883–1966), professional harpist
- Matt Festa (born 1993), baseball pitcher
- Vito Fossella (born 1965), politician
- Zack Granite (born 1992), baseball outfielder
- James Guyon Jr. (1778–1846), politician
- Daniel Paul Higgins (1886–1953), architect
- Andrew Lanza (born 1964), politician
- Nicholas LaPorte (1926–1990), politician
- Damien Leone (born 1982), director and screenwriter of horror films including the Terrifier series
- Nicole Malliotakis (born 1980), politician
- Edwin Markham
- Thomas John McDonnell (1894–1961), priest, bishop
- Alyssa Milano (born 1972), actress
- Ralph Munroe (1851–1933), yacht designer and pioneering settler of Miami
- Kevin O'Connor (born c.1947), basketball executive
- Garry Pastore (born 1961), actor, brother of Eric Blackwood
- Luke Pensabene (born 1991), actor and film producer
- Angelina Pivarnick (born 1986), Jersey Shore cast member
- Louis N. Scarcella (born 1951), homicide detective involved in 20 overturned convictions
- Francesco Scavullo (1921–2004), celebrity photographer
- Ricky Schroder (born 1970), actor
- Robert A. Straniere (born 1941), politician
