= South Shore, Staten Island =

Area in New York City

Coordinates: 40.537°N 74.161°W

Community District Tabulation Area South Shore (SI03) with neighborhoods of Annadale, Arden Heights, Charleston, Eltingville, Freshkills Park (South), Great Kills, Huguenot, Oakwood, Prince's Bay, Richmondtown, Rossville, Tottenville, Woodrow'"`UNIQ--ref-00000005-QINU`"'

The South Shore is a geographical term applied to the area in the New York City borough of Staten Island, south and east of the island's ridge of hills (and Richmond Creek and Fresh Kills south of Historic Richmond Town) along the waterfront and adjacent areas from the Narrows to the mouth of the Arthur Kill. Many observers prefer to restrict its scope to the neighborhoods located between the shoreline of Raritan Bay on one side and Richmond Creek and Fresh Kills on the other, thus encompassing the neighborhoods of Great Kills to Tottenville only. Those who use this narrower definition of the "South Shore" prefer the term "East Shore" for the communities that lie along Lower New York Bay, and inland for approximately 2 to 2 1/2 miles, from Bay Terrace and Richmondtown to as far north as Grasmere and Concord. The South Shore (under the narrower definition) is represented in the New York City Council by Frank Morano.

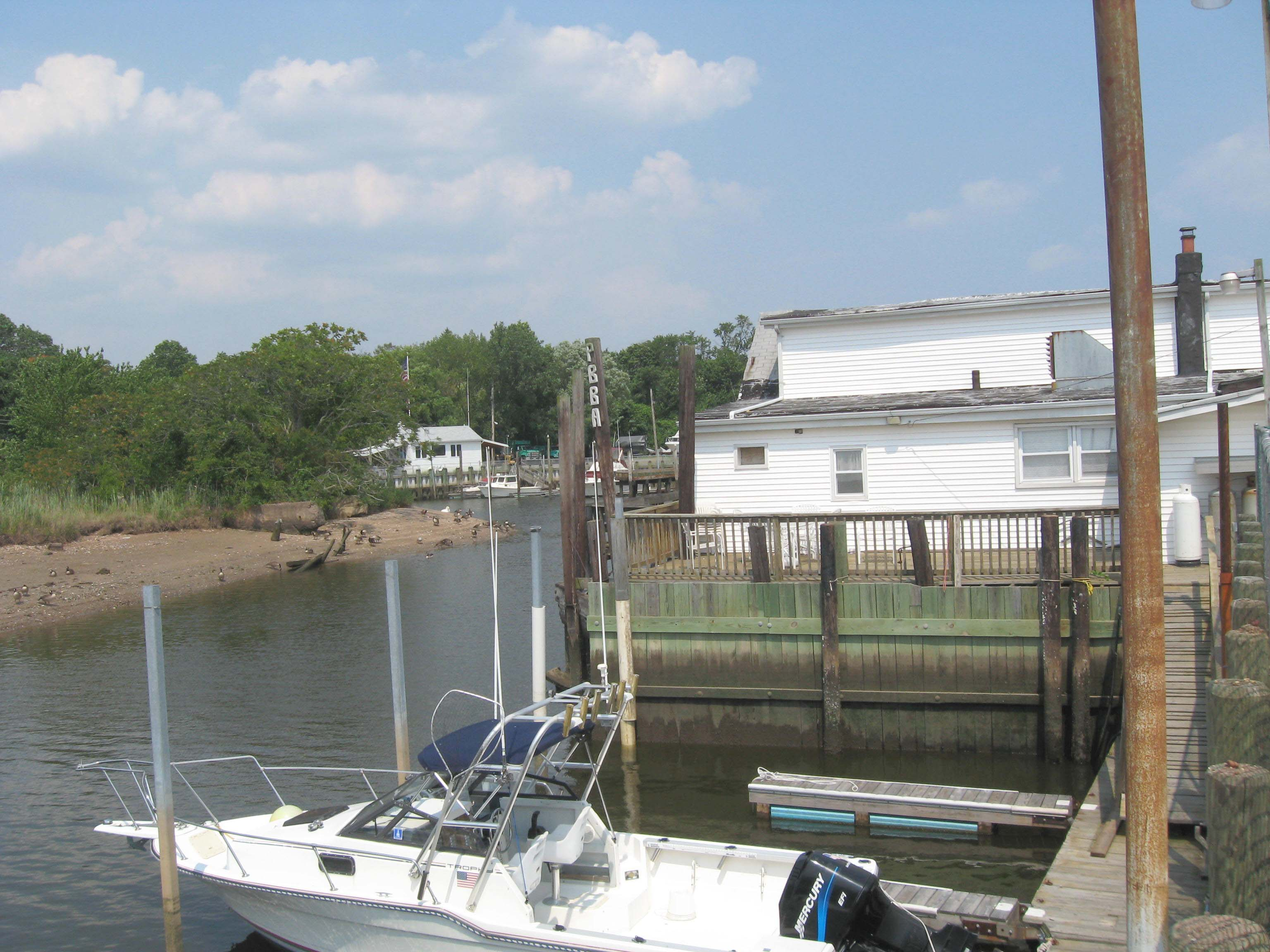
Lemon Creek

Geologically, the area is an outwash plain of glacial sediment formed from the edge of the terminal moraine, and continues as an underwater shoal into Lower New York Bay, where it was a prime oystering ground in the 19th century.

Prior to the 1960s, the South Shore was undeveloped. After the building of the Verrazzano–Narrows Bridge, the South Shore experienced rapid urbanization and its population rose sharply. The population is predominantly white, but according to census data has been growing more heterogeneous in recent years. Many residents are of Italian, Irish, English, and Jewish descent, with a massive boom to the Italian population in the 1980s and 1990s. The area generally has a low crime rate except for thefts.

Commerce was previously dominated by small businesses despite the presence of Hylan Boulevard running along the eastern boundary of the South Shore. However, a number of shopping centers have been built over the last decade. The area is still known for small businesses, including 24-hour delis, pork stores, pizzerias, cafés, gourmet food shops, and a number of independently owned pharmacies, florists, hair, tanning and nail salons, paint stores, and car repair shops.

== Transportation ==
Staten Islanders on the South Shore have the longest average commute of anyone in New York City. Commuters to Manhattan have the option of express buses, which run along Hylan Boulevard, Richmond Avenue, and New York State Route 440, or the Staten Island Railway. Express train service cuts the commute time to and from the Staten Island Ferry. Morning express trains make all local stops to New Dorp station, and then express to the St. George Terminal. In the evening, express trains travel from St. George to Great Kills station, then make all local stops until Tottenville station. Local trains make all stops.

The Charleston Bus Depot opened in January 2011 at Arthur Kill Road in Charleston.

Talks have been underway to implement a new Fast Ferry service from the Prince's Bay/Mount Loretto area on the Raritan Bay to both Midtown Manhattan and the Wall Street area. It is estimated based on several studies that the ridership base for such a ferry route would be substantial, given the lack of sufficient alternative public transportation from this area and its population of high-income professionals commuting to Manhattan.

Many commuters from the South Shore of Staten Island drive over the Outerbridge Crossing to the Park & Ride facility operated by NJ Transit at the Metropark Train Station in Iselin, NJ, which offers rail service to Newark Penn Station, New York Penn Station, and their many connecting services.
