= Great Kills Park =

Public park in Staten Island, New York

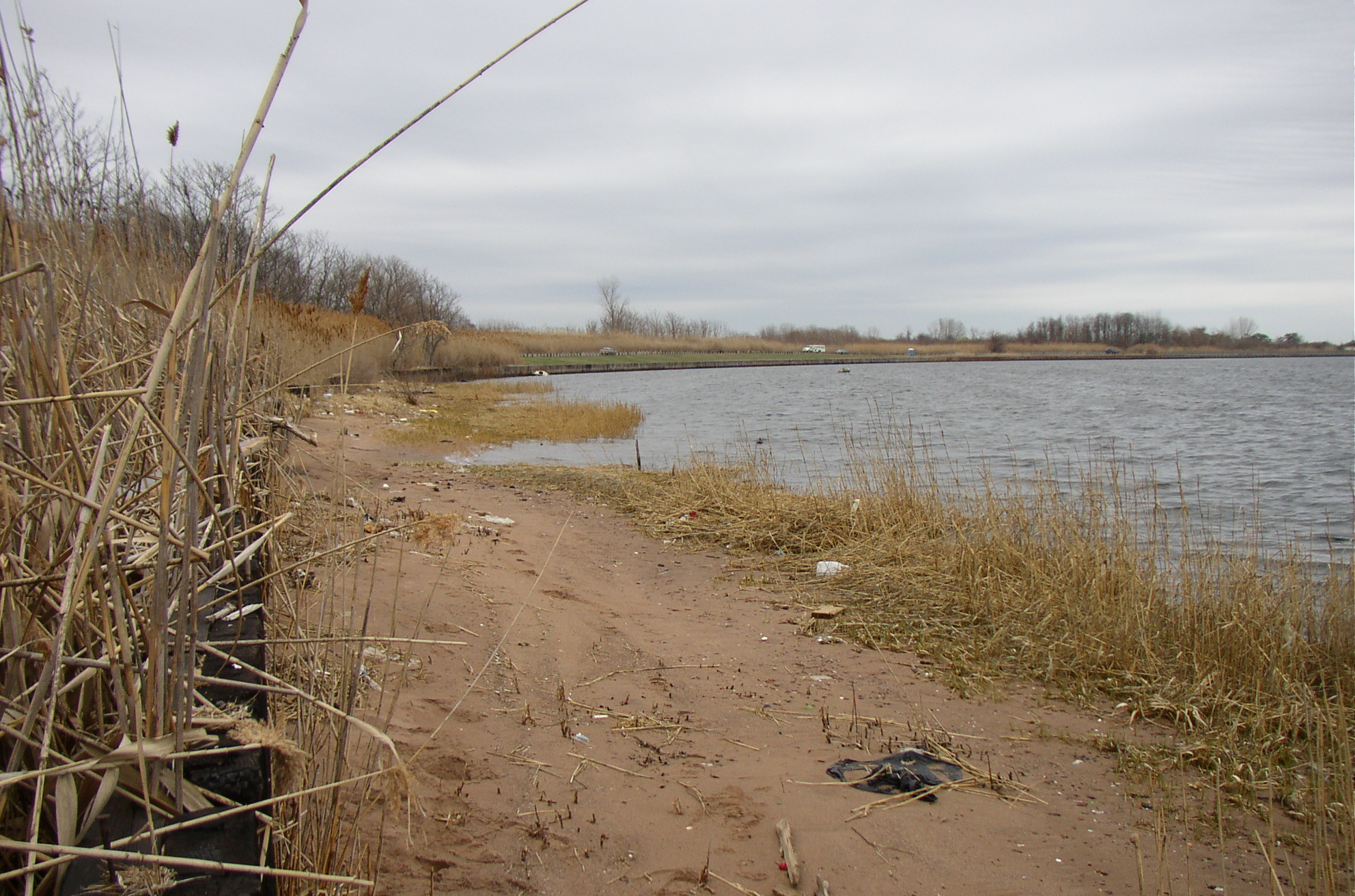
- Interactive map of Great Kills Park
- Type: Urban park
- Location: Staten Island, New York City, New York, United States
- Coordinates: 40°32′40″N 74°7′30″W
- Area: 580 acres (230 ha)
- Created: 1949
- Operator: National Park Service
- Status: Open all year. Approximately half of the park is closed for decontamination.

Great Kills Park is a public park in Great Kills, Staten Island, New York City. Originally named Marine Park, it is a part of the Staten Island unit of Gateway National Recreation Area. Administered by the National Park Service, it covers an area of approximately 580 acres (2.3 km^{2}) of salt marsh, beach and woodlands, stretching along two miles (3 km) of Staten Island's south shore.

== Access ==
The park's main entrance is at Hylan Boulevard and Buffalo Street, where there is a bus stop for the S78 and S79 SBS buses. The Bay Terrace station of the Staten Island Railway is also near the main entrance. Boaters can arrange access at Nichols Marina in Great Kills Harbor.

== History ==
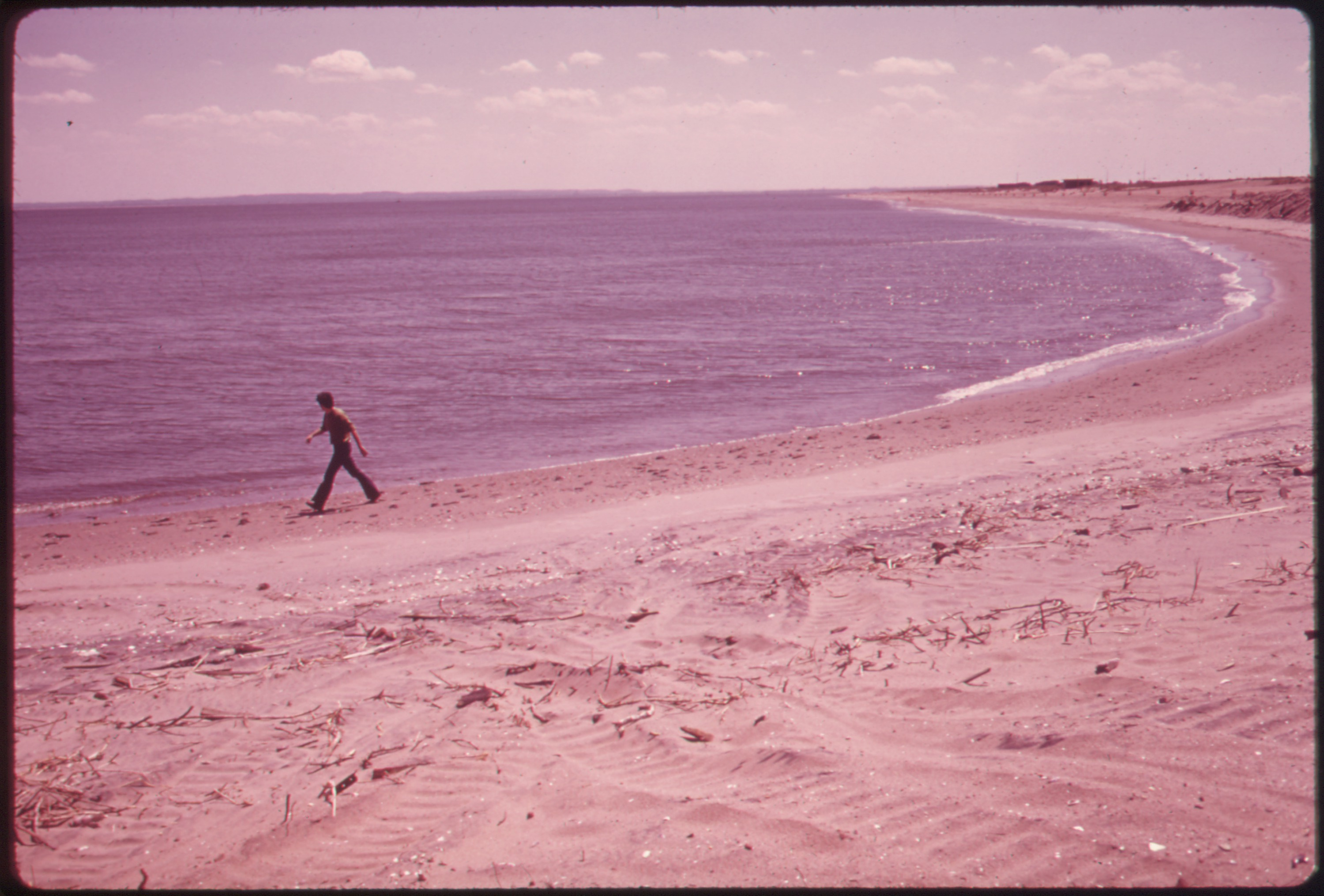
Beach at Great Kills Park, 1973. Photo by Arthur Tress.

In 1860, the businessman and pioneering naturalist John J. Crooke bought a part of the land and lived in a wooden house at the beach. In 1916, severe erosion cut the narrow spit of land and Crooke's Point became an island to itself.

As early as 1925, the New York City government was considering buying 50 acres (20 ha) of Crooke's land to build a playground. Mayor John Francis Hylan considered purchasing up to 443 acres (179 ha) of land for a larger park, with provisions for future additions to bring the park's size to 1,000 acres (400 ha). A resort would be built on the site, which was expected to cost $10 million.

In 1929, the city bought Crooke's Point and adjacent land and started to build a public park. Due to the Great Depression and World War II, the work was delayed and the park was not opened to the public until 1949.

The city operated an incinerator on the site of the park from 1926 to 1941, and over 197,000 tons of its toxic residue remained at the site. Additionally, 15 million tons of contaminated waste was used as landfill, with Robert Moses noting that the City of New York saved $5 million by using "Sanitation-controlled fill" to complete the park.

A pioneering rocket launch in 1933 led the American Institute of Aeronautics and Astronautics to commemorate the location as a "Historic Aerospace Site". Great Kills Harbor, located within the park, was created in the 1940s by expanding and reconnecting Crooke's Island to the rest of Staten Island, using landfill and dredge material.

Numerous species of birds frequent the park's diverse habitats. It became part of the Gateway National Recreation Area in 1973, along with Miller Field and Fort Wadsworth on Staten Island, Jamaica Bay in Brooklyn and Queens, and Sandy Hook in New Jersey. The park now includes the Nichols Marina, a beach, trails, fishing and bird-watching areas, and sports fields.

=== Radium contamination ===
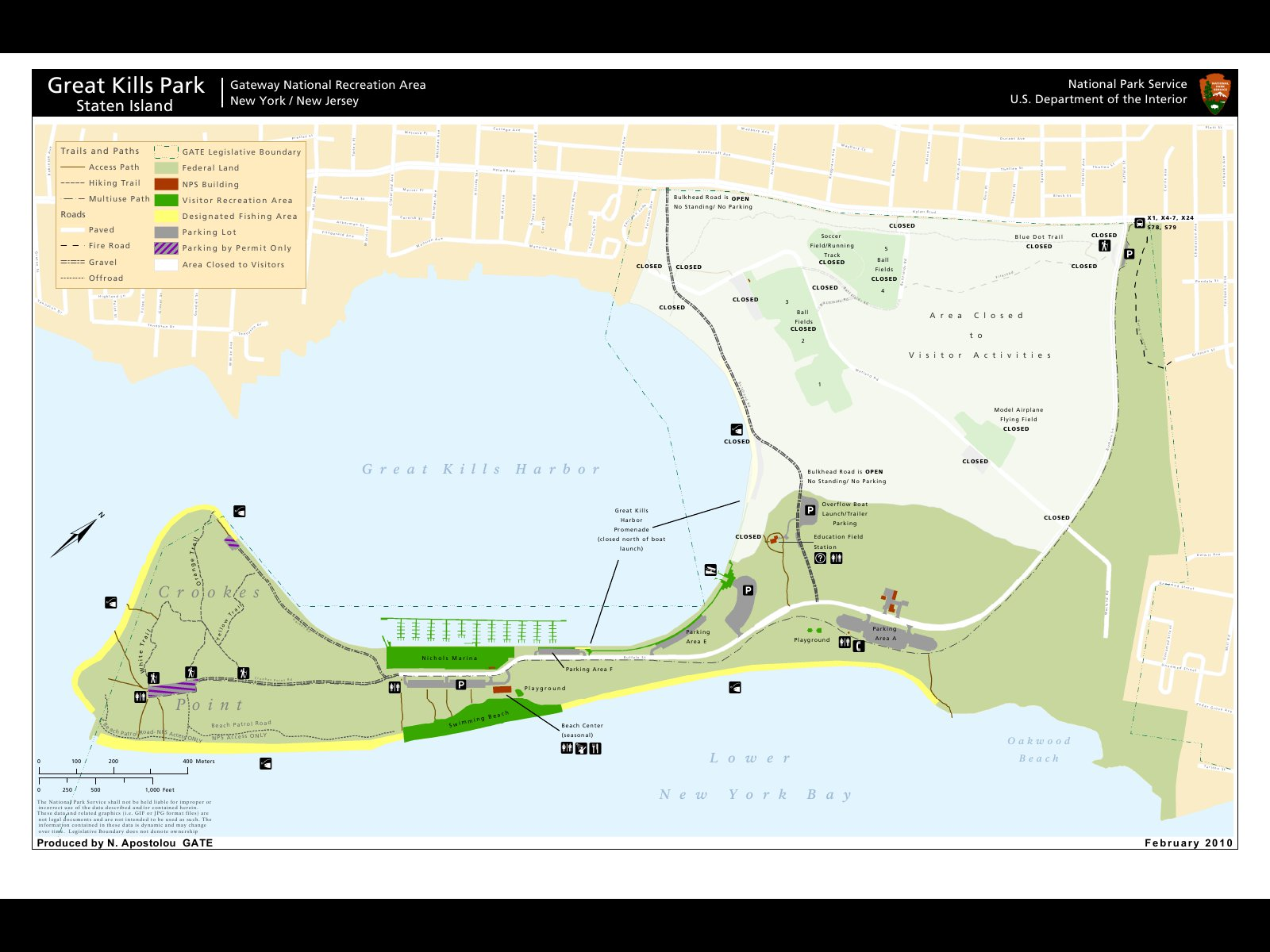
NPS map of the Park, displaying the closed area in white

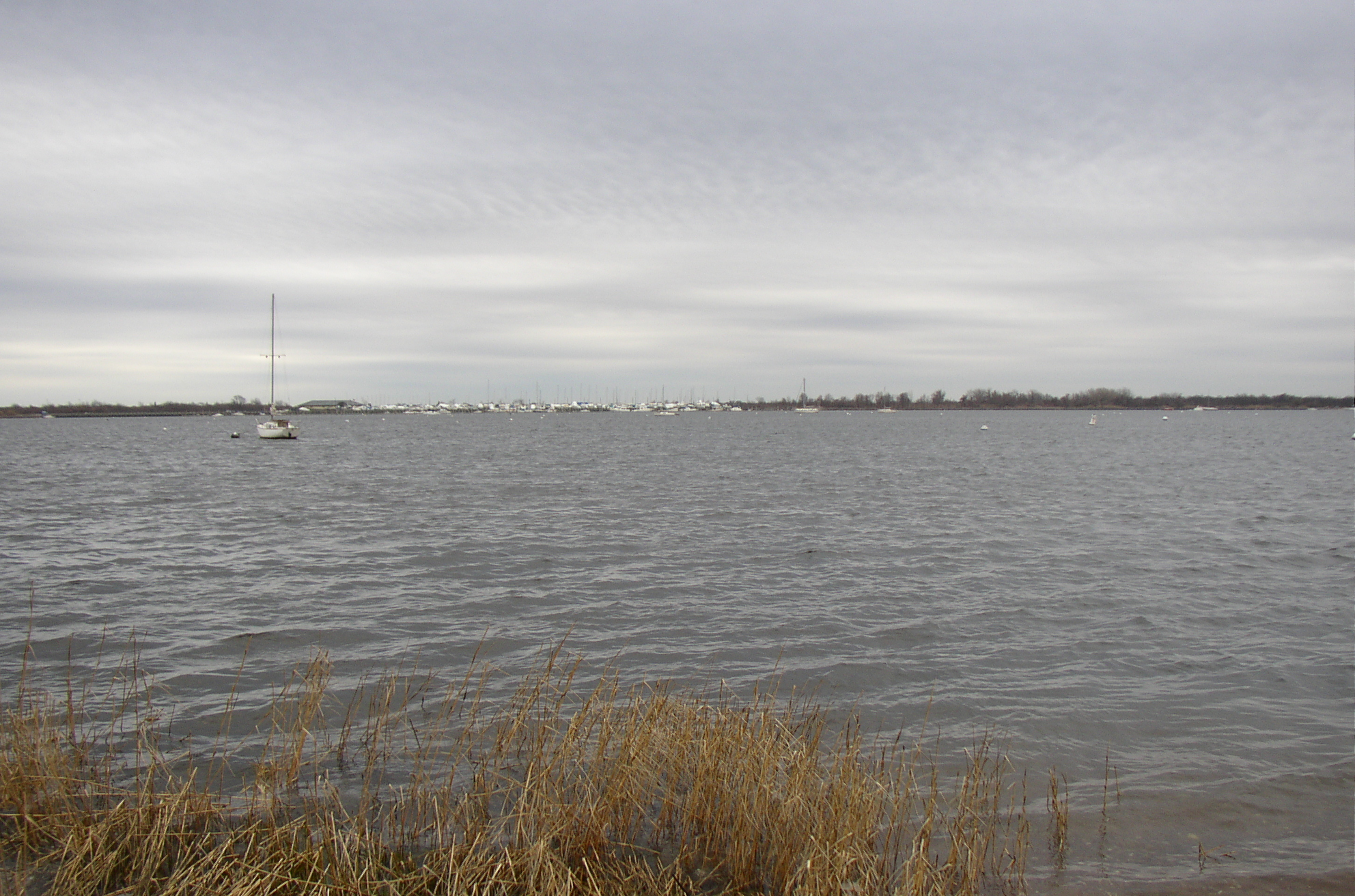
Great Kills Harbor view

The park's 15 million cubic yards of 1940s-era landfill included sanitary and medical waste. In 2005, radioactive radium (^{226}Ra, once used in cancer treatments) was found in the sand at a depth of about 1–1.5 feet (30–40 cm). Directly at the sources, investigators measured gamma radiation about 200 times higher than the natural background level. Approximately half of the park has been closed to the public since 2009, and in 2021 the National Park Service was working to complete a comprehensive "Remedial Investigation Report" for its long-term decontamination project. The NPS has officially completed the Remedial Investigations for both Operable Unit 1 (OU1) and Operable Unit 2 (OU2).
