= New Dorp station =

Staten Island Railway station

New Dorp
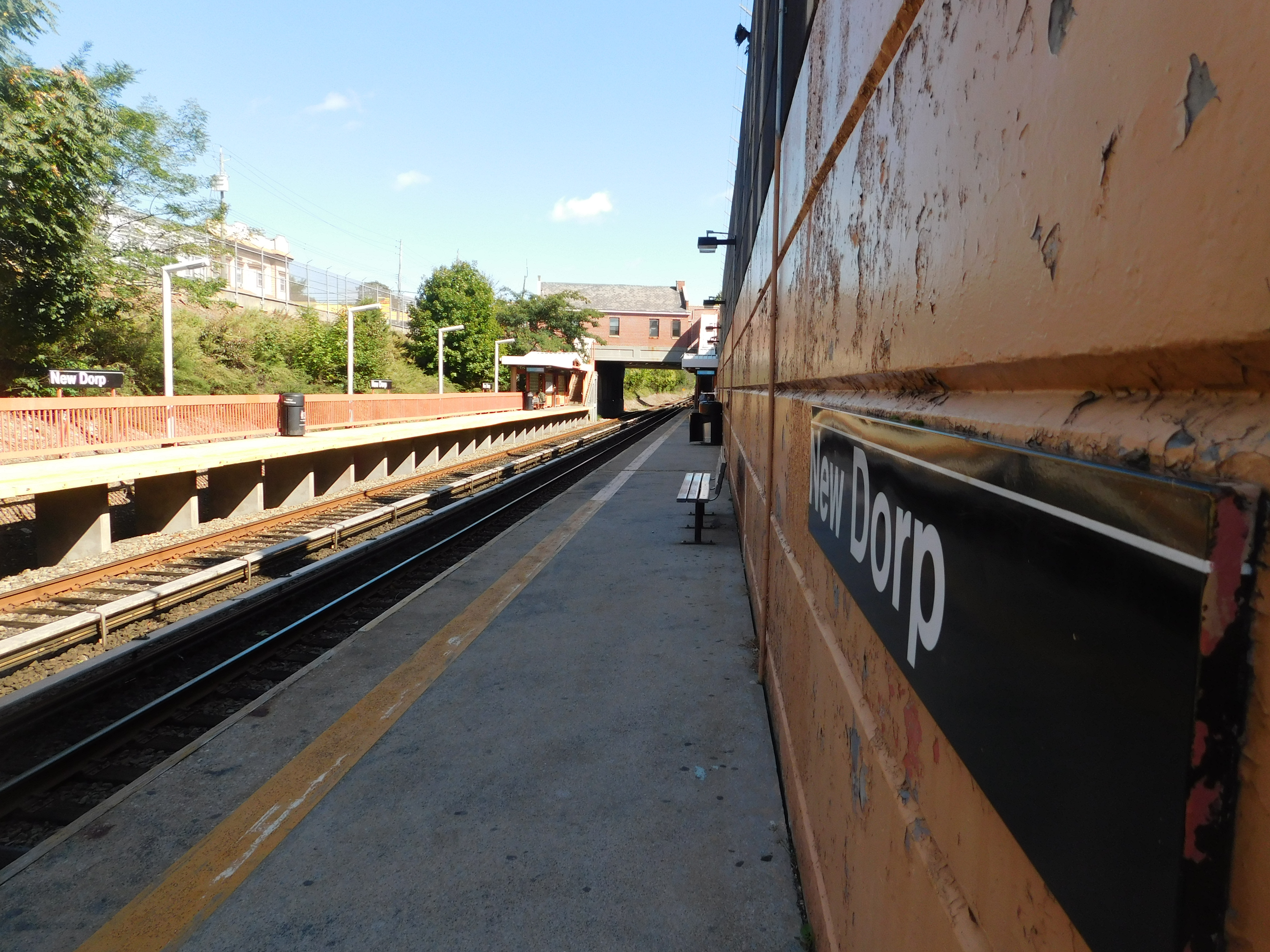
- New Dorp station in September 2020

General information
- Location: New Dorp Lane and North Railroad Avenue; New Dorp, Staten Island
- Coordinates: 40.5736°N 74.1171°W
- Platforms: 2 side platforms
- Tracks: 2
- Connections: NYCT Bus: S57, S76, S86

Construction
- Structure type: Open-cut
- Accessible: Yes

Other information
- Station code: 510

History
- Opened: April 23, 1860; 166 years ago
- Rebuilt: 1889, 1965–1968

Services
Preceding station	Staten Island Railway	Following station
Grant City toward St. George	Staten Island Railway	Oakwood Heights toward Tottenville
Track layout
Location

The New Dorp station is a Staten Island Railway station in the neighborhood of New Dorp, Staten Island, New York. The station became fully compliant with the Americans with Disabilities Act of 1990 in 2023.

== History ==
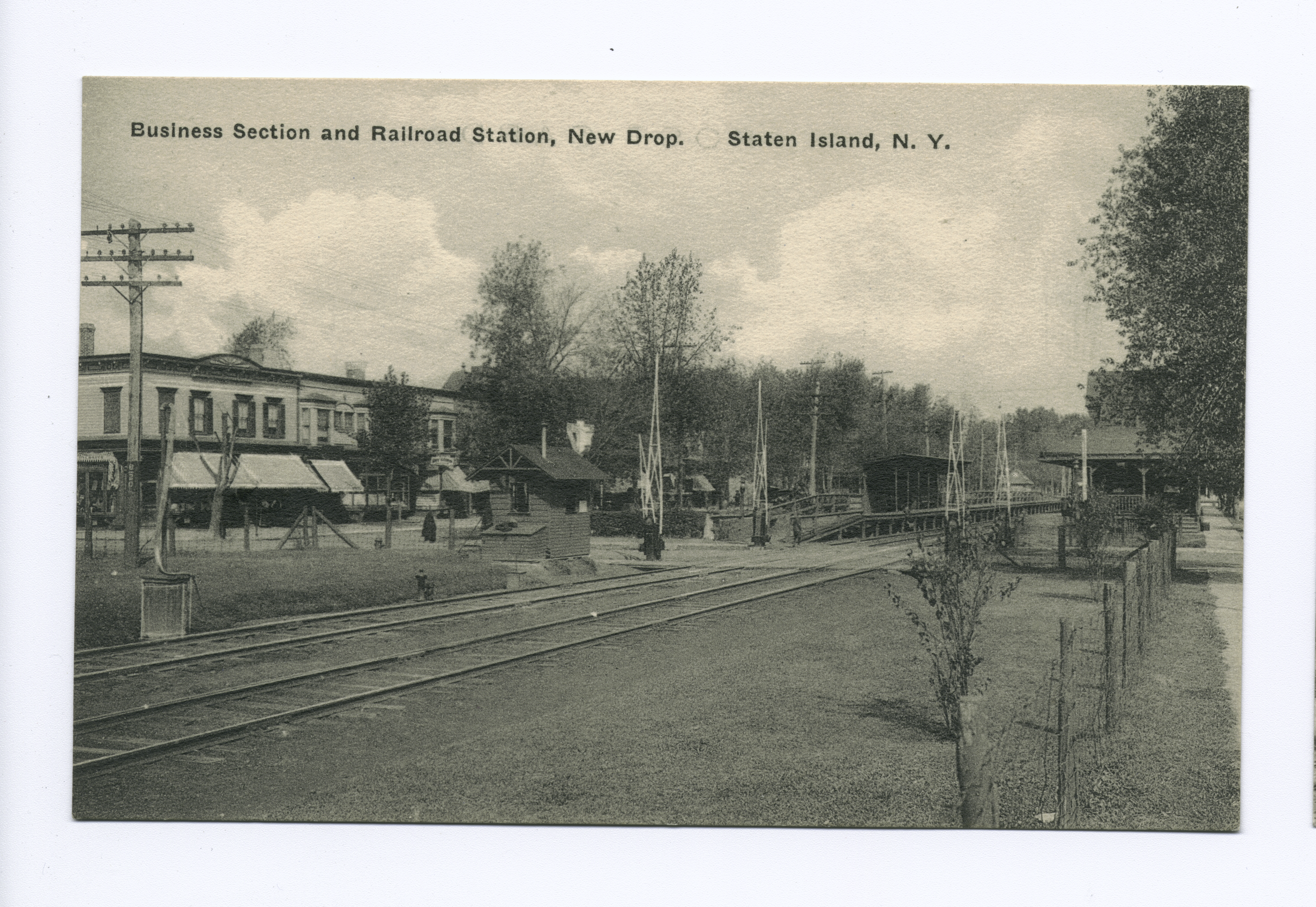
Early 20th century

The station opened on April 23, 1860, with the opening of the Staten Island Railway from Vanderbilt's Landing to Eltingville. It was rebuilt in 1889 by real estate developers Hughes and Ross who sought to build a depot designed to attract potential homebuyers. The former stationhouse that was in use until the 1965-1968 grade crossing elimination was moved to Historic Richmond Town, located at the three-way loop intersection of Arthur Kill Road, Richmond Road and Richmond Hill Road.

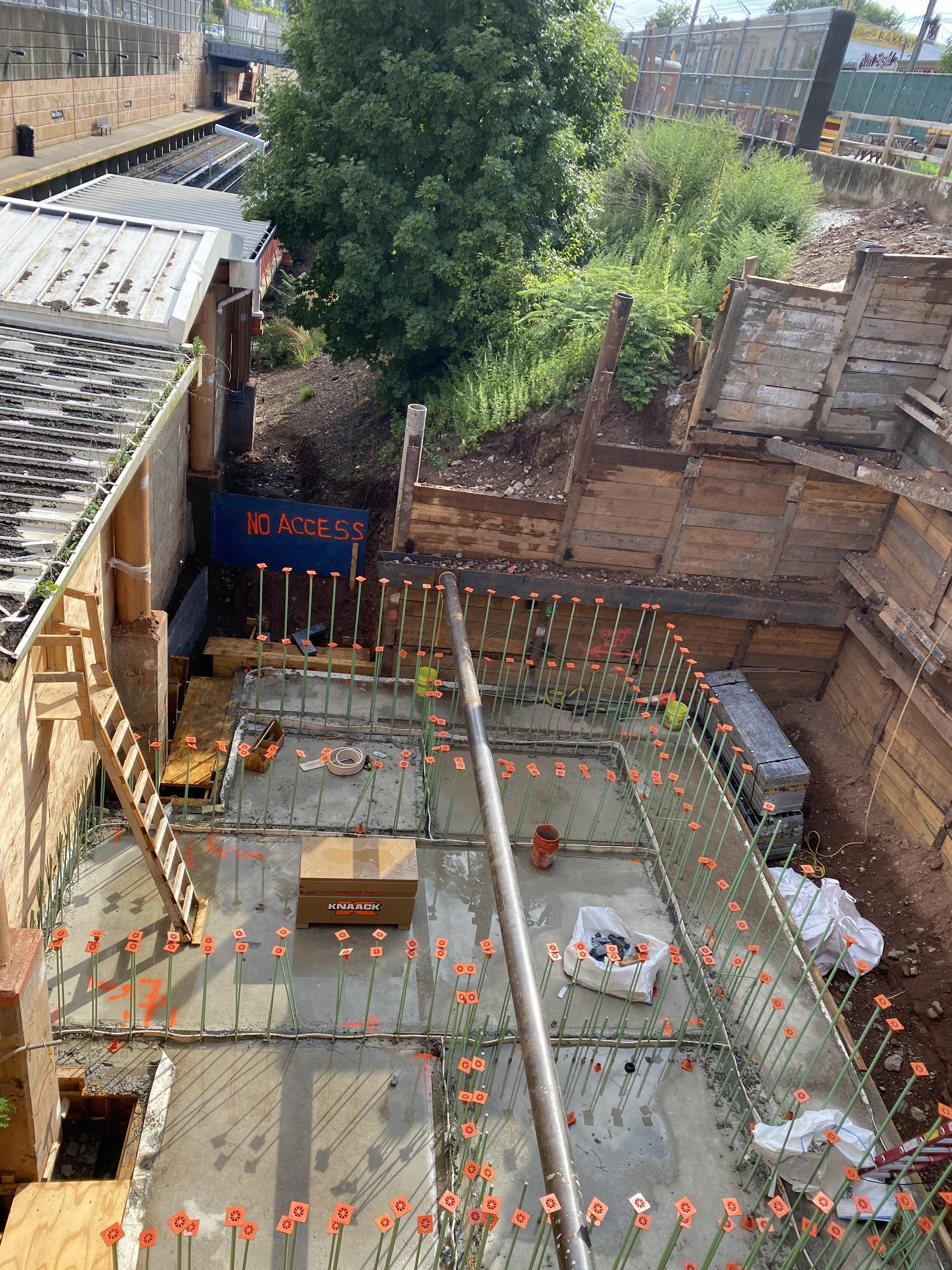
Construction on the new ADA accessibility upgrades included two new elevators. This is construction of the base of the elevator. July 2022. The ADA upgrades have since been completed.

In 2019, the Metropolitan Transportation Authority announced that this station would become ADA-accessible as part of the agency's 2020–2024 Capital Program. A contract for two elevators at the station was awarded in December 2020. The elevator towers were completed in early 2023, and the elevators opened for use on September 19, 2023.

== Station layout ==
New Dorp station is located in an open cut at New Dorp Lane and Railroad Avenue on the main line. It has two side platforms and orange colored walls and railings. The northbound platform has a 20-foot (6.1 m) high concrete wall, while the southbound platform has a hill. Express trains to St. George begin the express section of their run at New Dorp in the morning rush hour.

Ground	Street level	Station house, exit/entrance, buses
Platform level	Side platform
Platform level	Southbound	← toward Tottenville (Oakwood Heights) ← rush hour express does not stop here
Platform level	Northbound	toward St. George (Grant City) → AM rush express toward St. George (Terminus) →
Platform level	Side platform

=== Exits ===
The north exit leads to New Dorp Lane where the station house is located, while the south exit leads to Rose Avenue. The south side is the only exit location where both staircases are not aligned together on one side of the street. The staircase to the northbound platform starts on the south side of Rose Avenue while the staircase to the southbound platform starts on the north side. The elevator to the northbound platform is at the southwest corner of New Dorp Lane and New Dorp Plaza South, while the elevator to the southbound platform is at the southeast corner of New Dorp Lane and New Dorp Plaza North.

== Bus connections ==
- S57, S76, S86
