= Great Kills station =

Staten Island Railway station

Great Kills
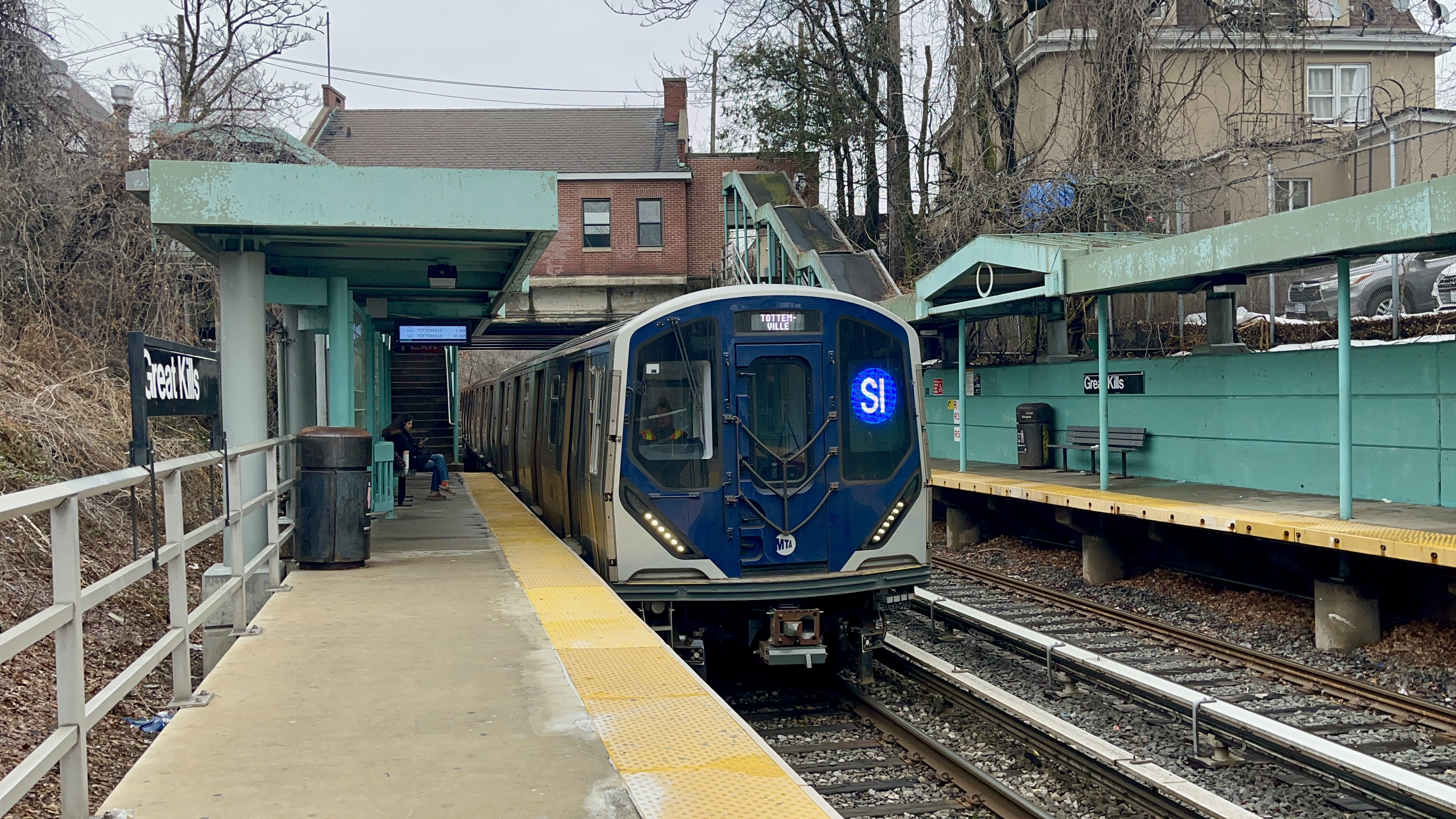
- Tottenville-bound train arriving at the station in March 2026

General information
- Location: Giffords Lane and Brower Court; Great Kills, Staten Island
- Coordinates: 40.55125°N 74.15132°W
- Platforms: 2 side platforms
- Tracks: 2
- Connections: NYCT Bus: S54, SIM5, SIM6

Construction
- Structure type: Open-cut
- Accessible: Yes

Other information
- Station code: 513

History
- Opened: April 23, 1860; 166 years ago
- Rebuilt: 1933; 1997
- Former names: Gifford's; Gifford's Lane

Services
Preceding station	Staten Island Railway	Following station
Bay Terrace toward St. George	Staten Island Railway	Eltingville toward Tottenville
Track layout
Location

The Great Kills station is a Staten Island Railway station in the neighborhood of Great Kills, Staten Island, New York. It is located on an open cut west of Giffords Lane and Amboy Road on the main line. It has two side platforms and turquoise blue canopies and walls.

== History ==
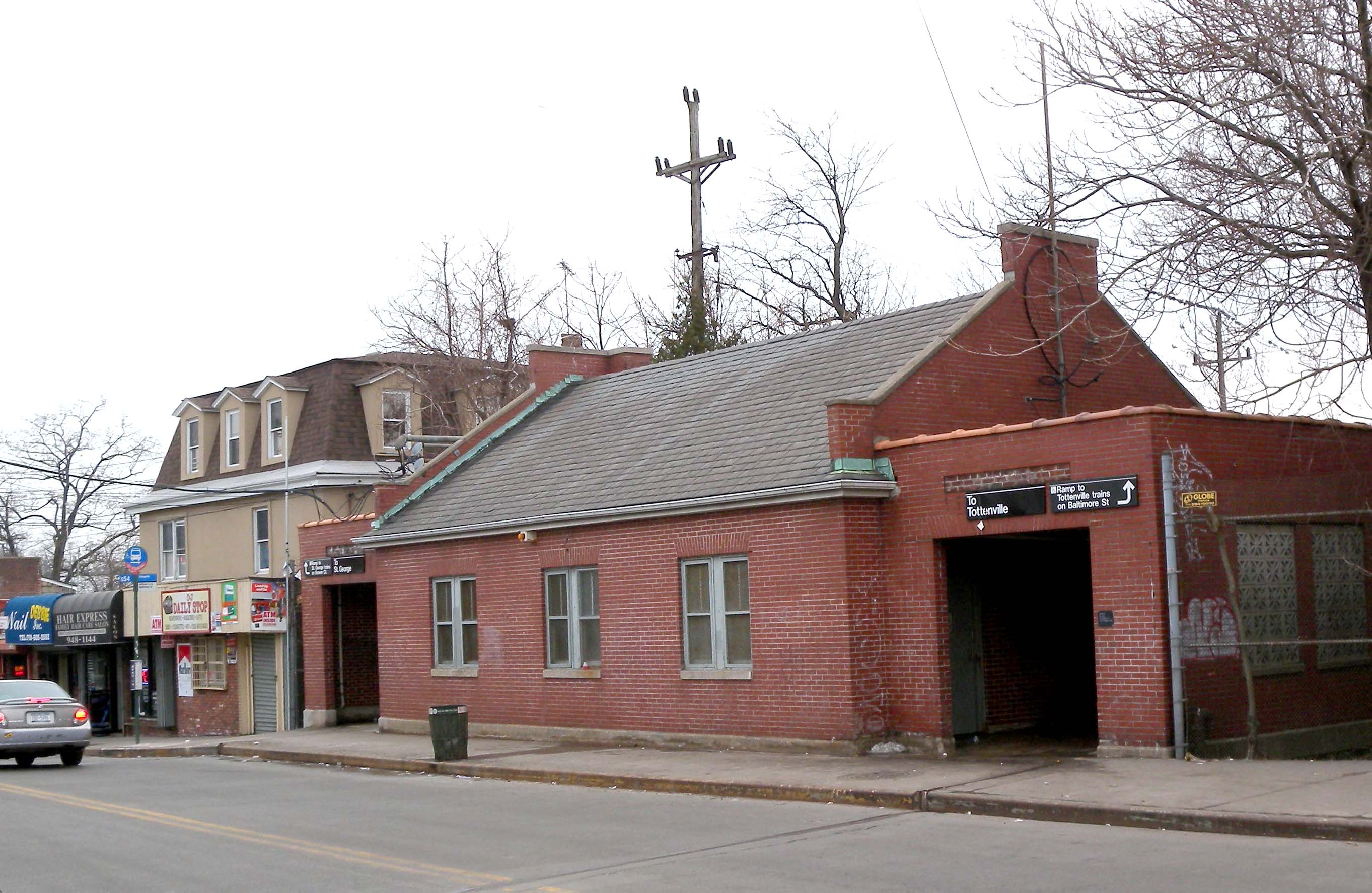
Station house located above the platforms at Giffords Lane

The station's original name was Gifford's, a previous name of the neighborhood honoring Daniel Gifford, a local commissioner and surveyor. The name also survives in Giffords Lane and Giffords Glen, which are adjacent to the station. The station was also known as Gifford's Lane. Both names appeared on the October 16, 1921, timetable.

The station opened on April 23, 1860, with the opening of the Staten Island Railway from Vanderbilt's Landing to Eltingville. It was rebuilt in the early 1930s to eliminate grade crossings, but with great difficulty. Workers had to dig 30 feet below ground level in order to avoid the underground springs and deep quicksand that laced the vicinity of the right-of-way. The project was finished by 1933.

== Station layout ==
The station is located in an open cut and has two tracks and two side platforms. Rush-hour express trains from St. George end their non-stop runs at this station. Local trains operating in the peak direction begin or end their runs here. New switches were installed in 1997 south of the platforms. The remains of a spur are visible in this area. The New York City Department of Transportation operates a park and ride lot near the station.

Mezzanine	Overpass	Exit/entrance, connection between platforms
Ground	Street level	Station house, exit/entrance, buses, parking Ramps on both sides of the station
Platform level	Side platform
Platform level	Southbound	← toward Tottenville (Eltingville) ← rush hour express toward Tottenville (Eltingville) ← rush hour local termination track
Platform level	Northbound	toward St. George (Bay Terrace) →
Platform level	Side platform

=== Exits ===
This station is handicapped-accessible in compliance with the Americans with Disabilities Act via a pair of long ramps. In addition, there are stairs and an overpass leading to Brower Court and Nelson Avenue. The Great Kills Veterans Memorial is outside the entrance on the northbound side. The north end at Giffords Lane has the standard SIRT street-level stationhouse, and staircases leading to a heavily used commercial district.
