= William Whitlock =

William Whitlock may refer to:

Ordered chronologically

- William Whitelock (1636–1717), also spelt Whitlock, English gentleman and member of parliament for the University of Oxford
- William Whitlock Jr. (1791–1875), American businessman
- Billy Whitlock (1813–1878), American blackface performer
- William Whitlock (journalist) (1891–1977), New Zealand journalist, newspaper editor and proprietor
- William Whitlock (politician) (1918–2001), British Labour Party MP for Nottingham North
