= Whitelocke =

Whitelocke is an English surname. Notable people with the name include:

- Bulstrode Whitelocke (1605–1675), English lawyer and politician
- Edmund Whitelocke (1565–1608), English soldier
- James Whitelocke (1570–1632), English judge
- John Whitelocke (1757–1833), British soldier

== See also ==
- Whitlock (surname)
