= Oakwood Heights station =

Staten Island Railway station

Oakwood Heights
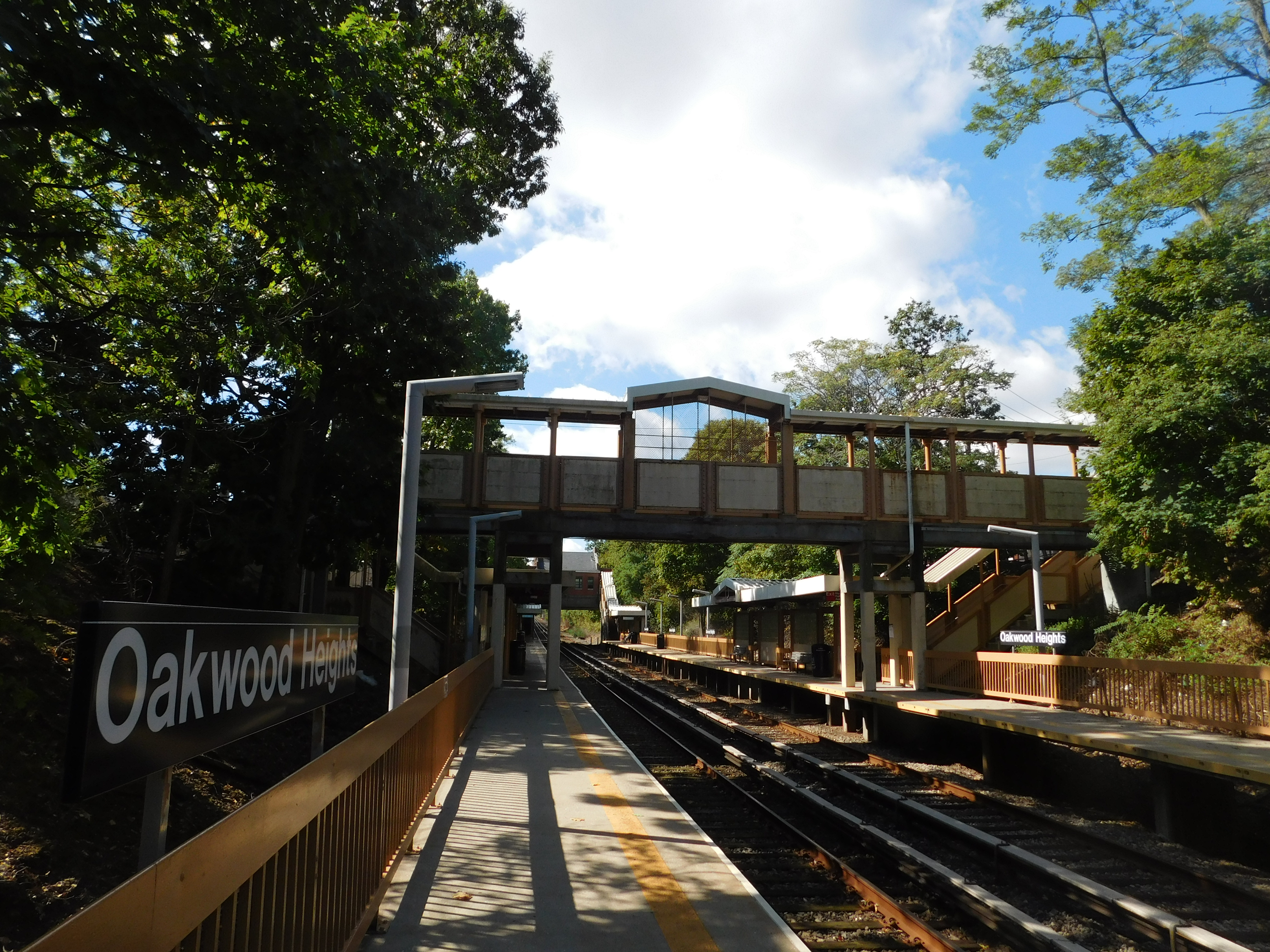
- Oakwood Heights station in September 2020

General information
- Location: Guyon Avenue and South Railroad Avenue; Oakwood, Staten Island
- Coordinates: 40.5647°N 74.1269°W
- Platforms: 2 side platforms
- Tracks: 2
- Connections: NYCT Bus: S57

Construction
- Structure type: Open-cut

Other information
- Station code: 511

History
- Opened: April 23, 1860; 166 years ago
- Former names: Richmond; Court House; Oakwood

Services
Preceding station	Staten Island Railway	Following station
New Dorp toward St. George	Staten Island Railway	Bay Terrace toward Tottenville
Track layout
Location

The Oakwood Heights station is a Staten Island Railway station in the neighborhood of Oakwood, Staten Island, New York.

== History ==
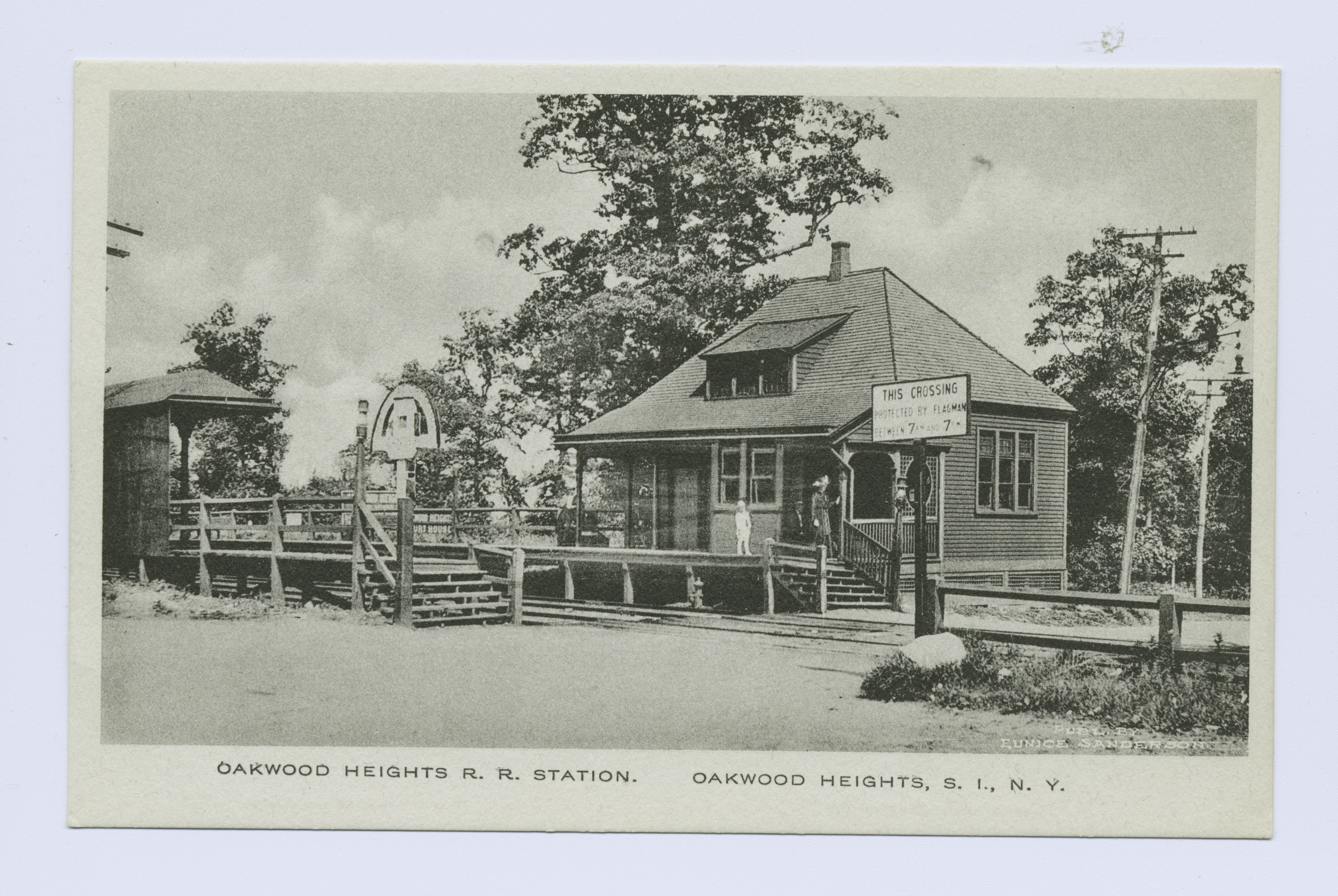
The station prior to its insertion into an open cut

The station opened as Richmond on April 23, 1860, with the opening of the Staten Island Railway from Vanderbilt's Landing to Eltingville. The station was named Richmond as the station was on the border between Richmond and Oakwood. Afterwards, sometime around 1885 the station was renamed Court House. The station was a flag stop. The station was later renamed Oakwood, and then finally Oakwood Heights after the other neighborhood on the border of the station. A 1909 timetable calls the station Oakwood Heights, but puts Court House in parentheses.

== Station layout ==
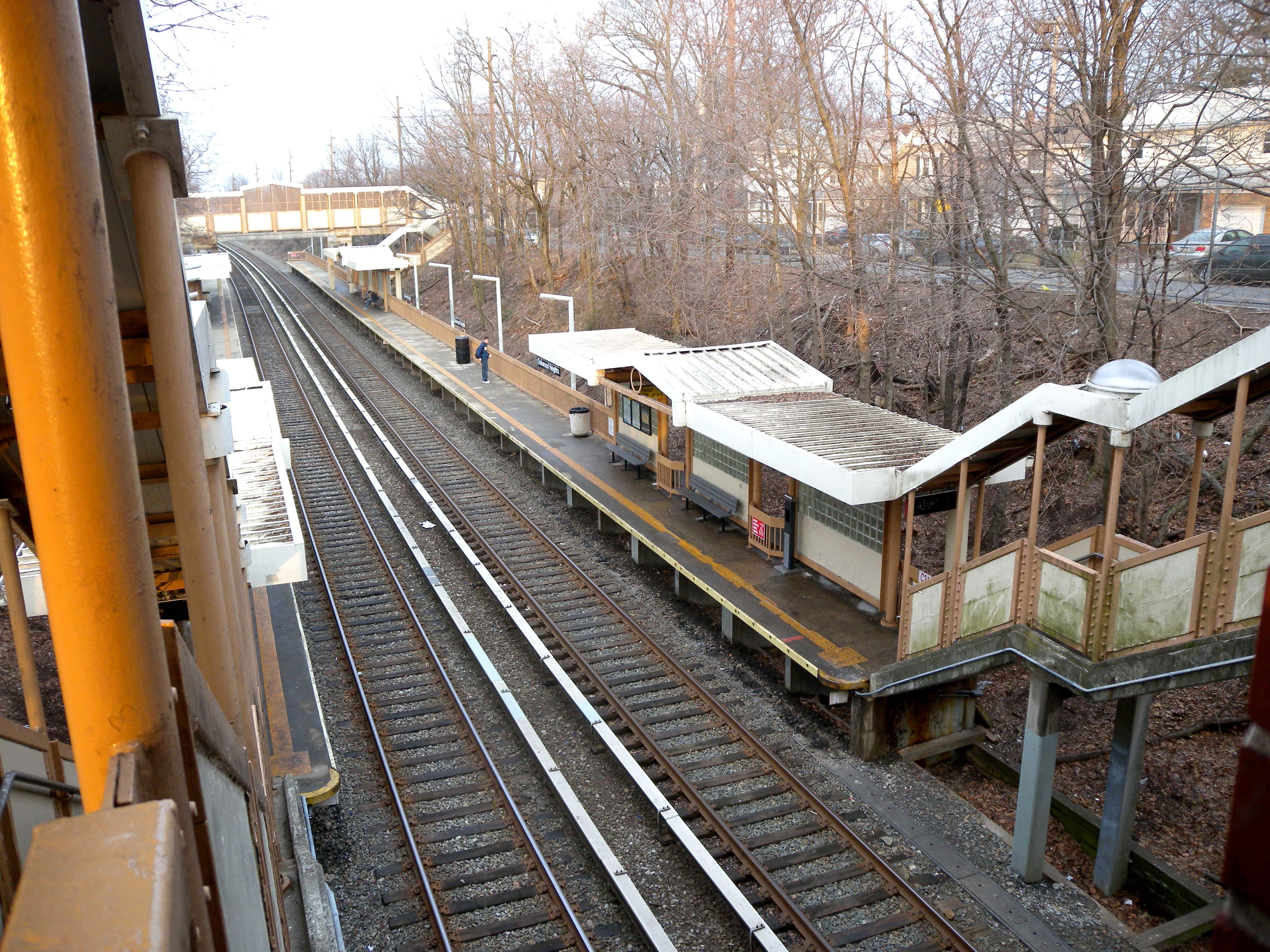
Northbound platform and tracks

The station is located on an open cut at Guyon Avenue and Railroad Avenue. It has two side platforms and beige painted walls. This station is used frequently by students of the nearby Monsignor Farrell High School.

Mezzanine	Overpass	Exit/entrance, connection between platforms
Ground	Street level	Station house, exit/entrance, buses
Platform level	Side platform
Platform level	Southbound	← toward Tottenville (Bay Terrace) ← rush hour express does not stop here
Platform level	Northbound	toward St. George (New Dorp) →
Platform level	Side platform

=== Exits ===
The north end has an overpass with two exits, one to Oak Avenue for the northbound platform, and the other to Cedarview Avenue for the southbound platform side. Another exit at the south end leads to Guyon Avenue.

== Bus connection ==
- S57
