= Oakwood, Staten Island =

Neighborhood in New York City

Coordinates: 40°33′37″N 74°07′12″W

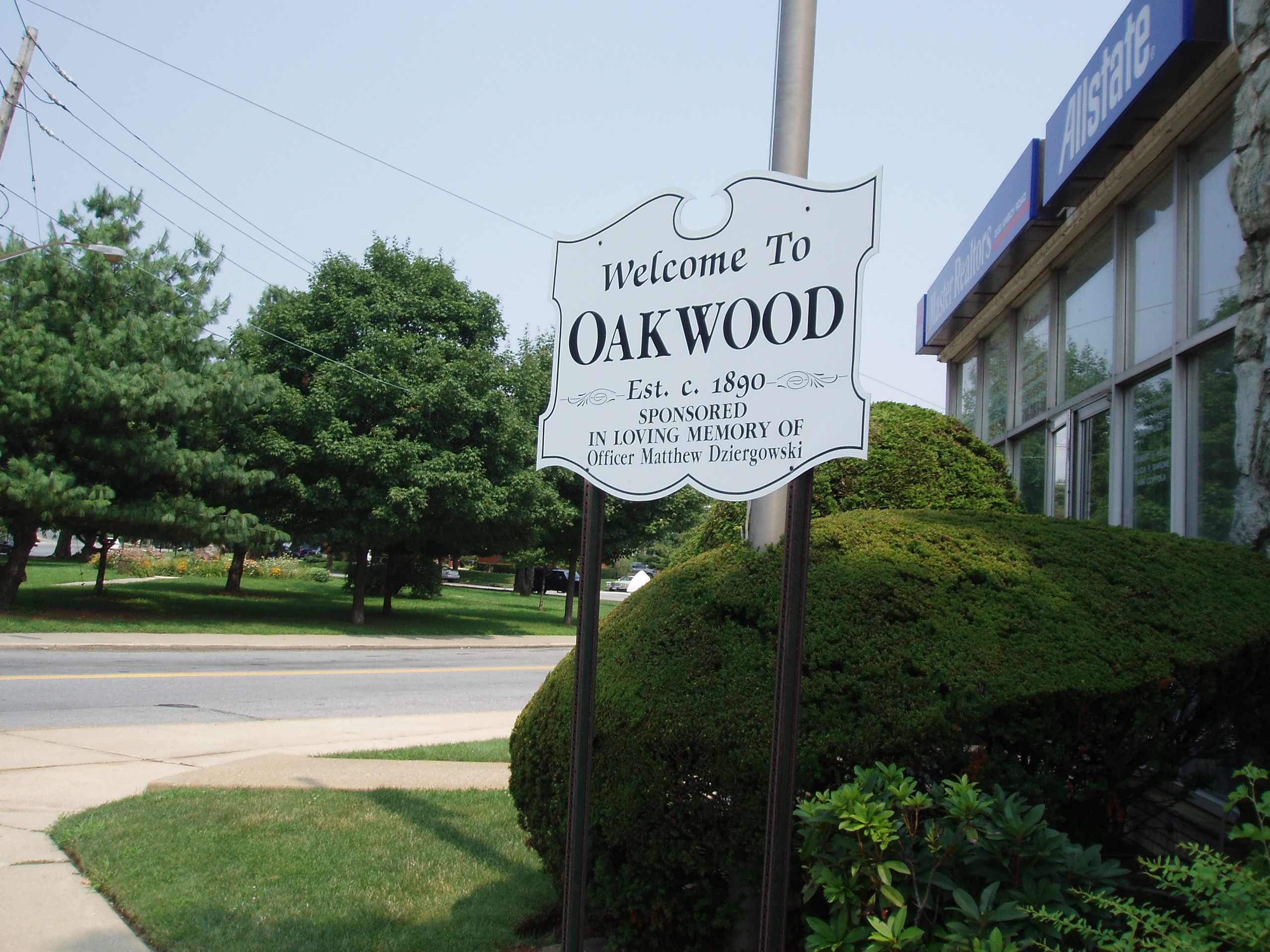
Oakwood Welcome Sign with Amundsen Circle in the background

Oakwood is a neighborhood located in east central Staten Island, New York City, near the South Shore. It is bordered by Tysens Lane (north); the Atlantic Ocean (east); Great Kills Park (south); Kensico Street, and Clarke Avenue (west).

The neighborhood has a coastline on the Lower New York Bay; the coastal area is sometimes referred to as Oakwood Beach, and is the site of a sewage treatment facility. Bordering this facility on the south is the Staten Island Unit of the Gateway National Recreation Area, also known locally (and formerly, officially) as Great Kills Park.

Oakwood's ZIP Code is 10306, served by a post office in New Dorp, the community's northern neighbor.

== History ==
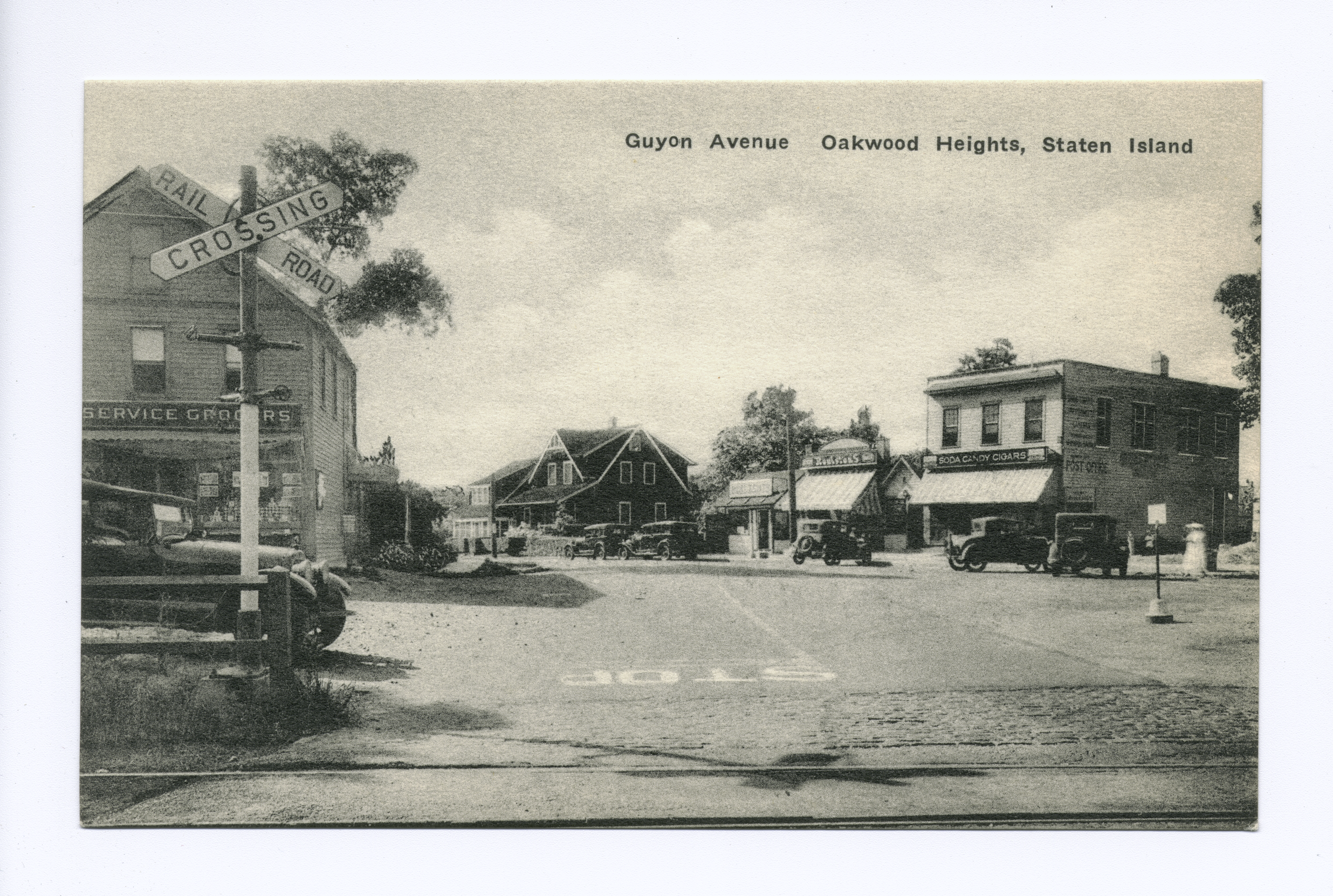
Guyon Avenue, Oakwood Heights, middle 20th century

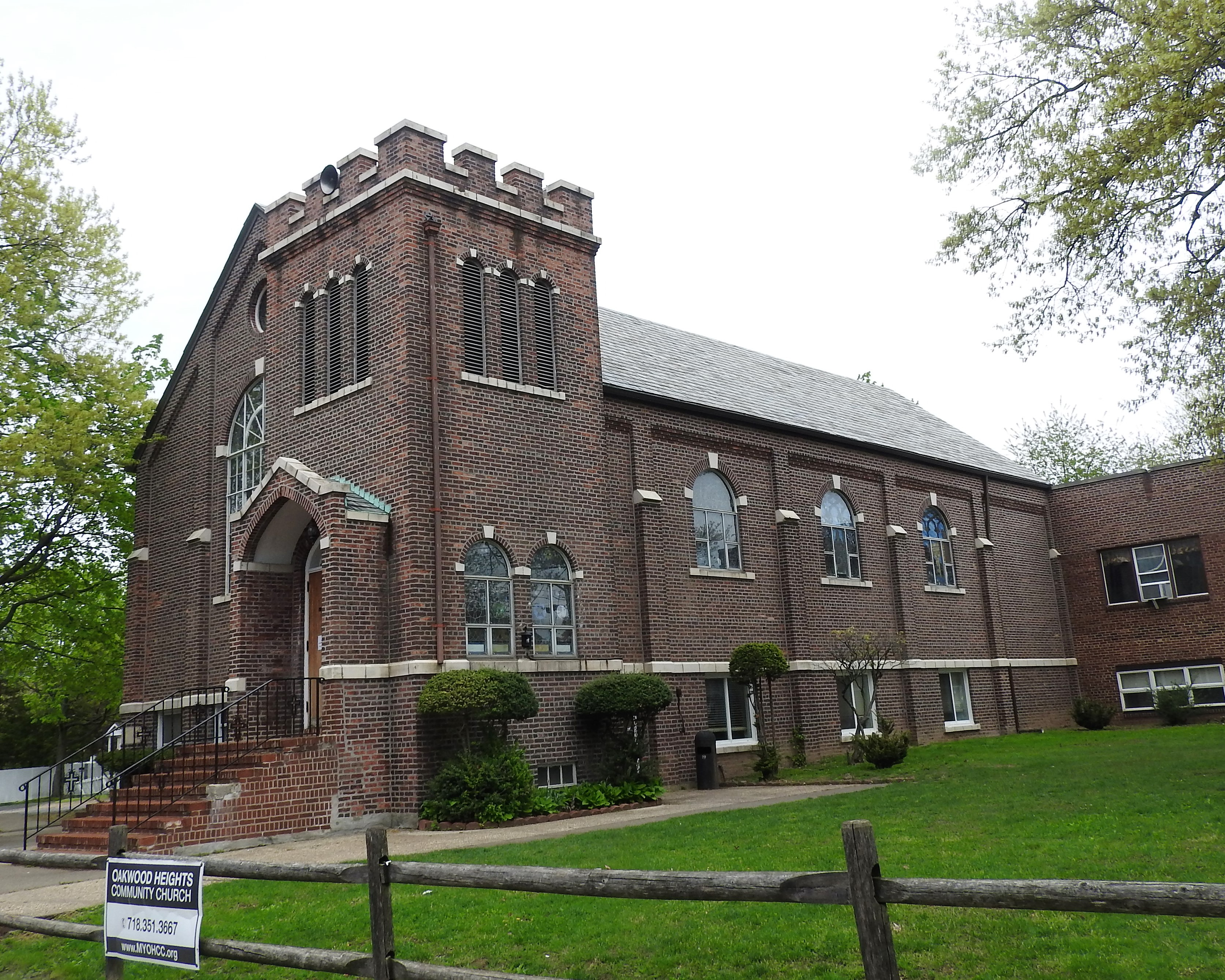
Oakwood Heights Community Church

Dominated by farmland in the heights area, and an ocean resort in the beach area until the mid-20th century, Oakwood started suburbanization when a Staten Island Tunnel was proposed to connect to the New York City Subway. Development was rapid after the Verrazzano–Narrows Bridge opened in November 1964. Today, Oakwood is a middle-class neighborhood of one- and two-family homes and garden apartments, with important commercial establishments along Hylan Boulevard.

Oakwood Beach underwent massive damage during Hurricane Sandy in late October 2012. A year later, due to the damage and low elevation, neighborhood homeowners were given the option of government buyouts, which would leave the area as a vacant buffer zone for future storms.

== Demographics ==
For census purposes, the New York City Department of City Planning classifies Oakwood as part of a larger Neighborhood Tabulation Area called Oakwood-Richmondtown SI0301. This neighborhood had 22,388 inhabitants based on data from the 2020 United States Census. This was an increase of 339 persons (1.5%) from the 22,049 counted in 2010. The neighborhood had a population density of 17.0 inhabitants per acre (14,500/sq mi; 5,600/km2).

The racial makeup of the neighborhood was 72.9% (16,322) White (Non-Hispanic), 2.6% (581) Black (Non-Hispanic), 10.6% (2,366) Asian, 2.7% (596) from some other race or from two or more races. Hispanic or Latino of any race were 11.3% (2,523) of the population.

According to the 2020 United States Census, this area has many cultural communities of over 1,000 inhabitants. These groups are residents who identify as Puerto Rican, Chinese, German, Irish, and Italian.

Most inhabitants are higher-aged adults: 23.1% are between 50-64 years old. 72.4% of the households had at least one family present. Out of the 8,202 households, 51.3% had a married couple (19.9% with a child under 18), 3.9% had a cohabiting couple (1.5% with a child under 18), 16.0% had a single male (1.4% with a child under 18), and 28.8% had a single female (3.8% with a child under 18). 30.3% of households had children. In this neighborhood, 34.3% of non-vacant housing units are renter-occupied.

== Points of interest ==
Points of interest located in Oakwood include Monsignor Farrell High School and a string of cemeteries on the neighborhood's southwest side, most notably Frederick Douglass Memorial Park, an African-American burial ground – an anomaly as very few African-Americans actually reside in Oakwood or any of the neighborhoods that surround it. Historic Richmond Town lies immediately to the west.

The greenbelt woods located along Riedel Avenue have some concrete artifacts (such as a piece of sidewalk located near the pond at Riedel and Thomas Street), and pieces of the Great Depression can be occasionally found along the trails, such as bricks or chimneys or foundations of houses that were once located in the area, when it was still rural. The trails along Riedel Avenue, once planned for the Willowbrook Parkway, also contain large boulders dropped off from glacial retreat during the ice age (though many are painted red due to vandals).

=== Amundsen Circle ===
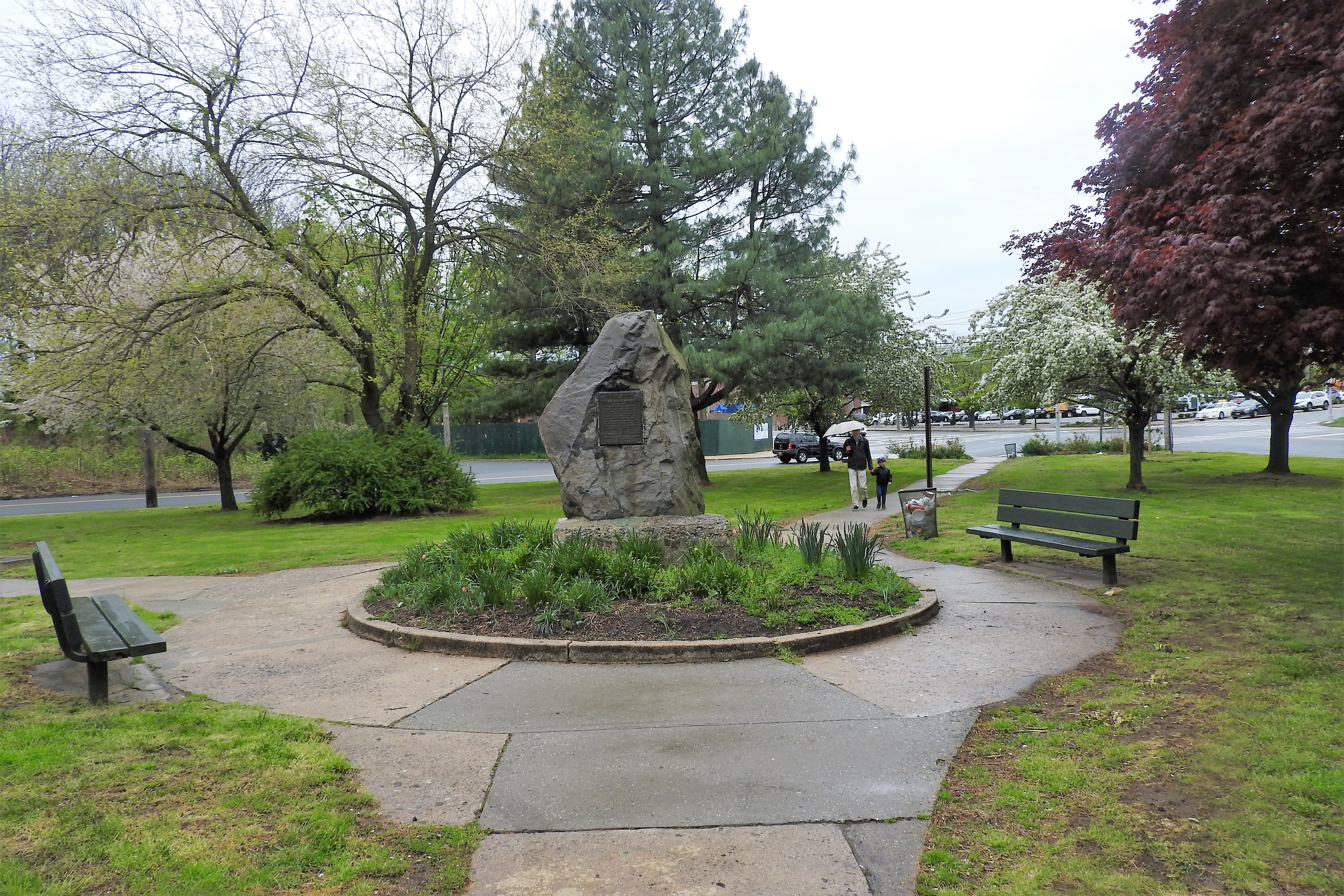
Monument

Amundsen Circle (officially Captain Roald Amundsen Plaza) is a traffic circle and 1.05-acre (4,200 m^{2}) park bounded by Amboy Road, Clarke Avenue and Savoy Street. Amundsen Circle and the 4.5-mile (7.2 km) Amundsen Trail for joggers both commemorate explorer Roald Amundsen. The park was acquired by the city in 1928, and named on July 9, 1929. In the park, there is a stone plaque, erected in 1933, when there was a large Norwegian population in Oakwood, by the Norsemen Glee Club of Staten Island and the Norwegian Singing Society of Brooklyn. The park is maintained by the Richmond Ever-Green Garden Club.

== Public transportation ==
The Staten Island Railway serves the neighborhood at its eponymous station. Oakwood Heights' bus service is provided by the S57, S76, S78, S79 SBS and S86 local buses and the SIM1, SIM5, SIM6, SIM7, SIM9, SIM10 and SIM22 express buses.
