= Whitlock (surname) =

Whitlock is a surname of Old English origin, meaning “white enclosure” from Old English hwit “white” and locc “lock, enclosure”. The name also means "white hair" in Old English. Notable people with the name include:

- Albert Whitlock (1915–1999), English motion picture matte artist
- Anna Whitlock (1852–1930), Swedish feminist
- Barbara Ann Whitlock (born 1967), American botanist
- Billy Whitlock (1813–1878), American blackface performer
- Bob Whitlock (born 1949), Canadian ice hockey player
- Bob Whitlock (musician) (1931–2015), American jazz double-bassist
- Bobby Whitlock (1948–2025), American singer, songwriter and musician
- Brand Whitlock (1869–1934), American municipal reformer, diplomat, journalist, and author
- Dave Whitlock (born 1966), Canadian racing driver
- David W. Whitlock (born 1962), American university president, author, Baptist minister
- E. Florence Whitlock (1889–1978), British composer, conductor, and educator
- Ed Whitlock (1931–2017), English-Canadian long distance runner
- Elizabeth Whitlock (1761–1836), British stage actress
- Garrett Whitlock (born 1996), American baseball player
- Harold Whitlock (1903–1985), British Olympic athlete in the 1936 Olympics
- Isiah Whitlock Jr. (1954–2025), American actor
- Jack Whitlock (born 2006), Australian rules footballer, twin brother of Matt
- Jason Whitlock (born 1967), American sportswriter and radio personality
- Jeremy Whitlock (born 1965), reactor physicist
- Ken Whitlock (1920–2012), American football player
- Lee Whitlock (born 1968), British television actor
- Matt Whitlock (born 2006), Australian rules footballer, twin brother of Jack
- Max Whitlock (born 1993), British artistic gymnast, 2 times world champion and 2 times olympic gold medallist
- Percy Whitlock (1903–1946), English organist and composer
- Phil Whitlock (footballer) (1930–2009), Welsh footballer
- Phil Whitlock (squash player) (born 1962), English squash player
- Simon Whitlock (born 1969), Australian darts player
- Tom Whitlock (1954–2023), American songwriter and lyricist
- William Whitlock (disambiguation)

== See also ==
- Whitelocke
