= Phil Whitlock (footballer) =

Welsh footballer

Personal information
- Full name: Philip John Whitlock
- Date of birth: 1 May 1930
- Place of birth: Llanhilleth, Wales
- Date of death: 2009 (aged 78–79)
- Place of death: Chester, England
- Position: Wing half

Senior career*
| Years | Team | Apps | (Gls) |
| 1950–1959 | Chester | 142 | (3) |
- * Club domestic league appearances and goals

Phil Whitlock (1 May 1930 – December 2009) was a Welsh footballer, who played as a wing half in the Football League for Chester.
