= Bay Terrace station =

Staten Island Railway station

Bay Terrace
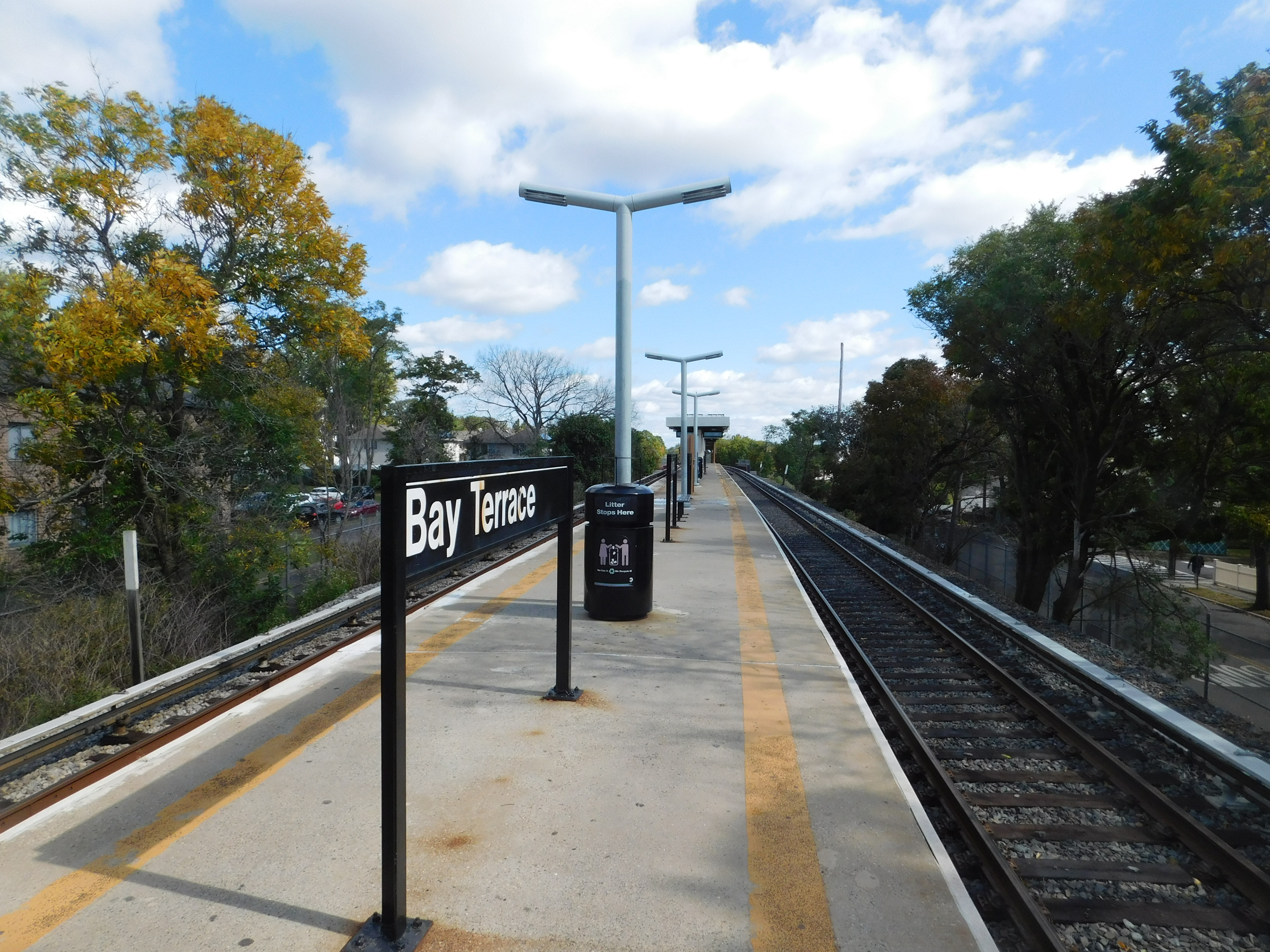
- Bay Terrace station in September 2020

General information
- Location: Justin Avenue and South Railroad Avenue; Bay Terrace, Staten Island
- Coordinates: 40.55658°N 74.13663°W
- Platforms: 1 island platform
- Tracks: 2

Construction
- Structure type: Embankment

Other information
- Station code: 512

History
- Opened: c. 1897; 129 years ago (Brendan) c. 1902; 124 years ago (Whitlock) c. 1910s (Bay Terrace)
- Former names: Whitlock

Services
| Preceding station | Staten Island Railway | Following station |
|---|---|---|
| Oakwood Heights toward St. George | Staten Island Railway | Great Kills toward Tottenville |
Track layout
Location

The Bay Terrace station is a Staten Island Railway station in the neighborhood of Bay Terrace, Staten Island, New York.

== History ==
The station opened c. 1897 as a flag stop named Brendan. and was renamed by 1902 as Whitlock. Whitlock was located on Park Place (present-day-Railroad Avenue) in between Washington Avenue (Hopkins Avenue) and Grant Avenue (Spratt Avenue). On December 18, 1912, a public hearing was held by the Public Service Commission (PSC), which among other things, was hearing the Staten Island Rapid Transit Company (SIRT)'s petition to abandon the Whitlock station and replace it with the Bay Terrace station. The movement of the station was done in anticipation of a change in the center of population in the area. The new station was to be built 1,594 feet (486 m) to the south of the Whitlock station.

On April 13, 1922, the SIRT petitioned to the PSC to move the station 1,000 feet (300 m) to the east of the station to Lincoln Road and to renamed the station Rice Manor. The PSC denied the application as the move would allow fewer people to use the station. There were 35 homes immediately surrounding the existing station while there were only 3 at the proposed location. The move was intended to spur development in the surrounding area. In 1922, Bay Terrace was made a full-time station. It had previously been closed during part of the year.

== Station layout ==
The station is located on an embankment at Bay Terrace and South Railroad Avenue on the main line. It has an island platform and exits are located at both ends. During a renovation, the glass windows and exterior staircases were refurbished at both ends.

| P Platform level | Southbound | ← toward Great Kills or Tottenville (Great Kills) ← rush hour express does not stop here |
| P Platform level | Island platform |
| P Platform level | Northbound | toward St. George (Oakwood Heights) → |
| G | Street level | Exit/entrance, parking, buses |

=== Exits ===
The north exit leads to Justin Avenue while the south exit leads to Bay Terrace. Both ends have a street-level underpass, but the one at the south end is pedestrian-only while the north end is for both pedestrians and vehicles. The south end has greenery outside both sides of the underpass. This greenery is maintained by the New York City Parks Department.
