= New Dorp, Staten Island =

Neighborhood in New York City

New Dorp
- Neighborhood of Staten Island
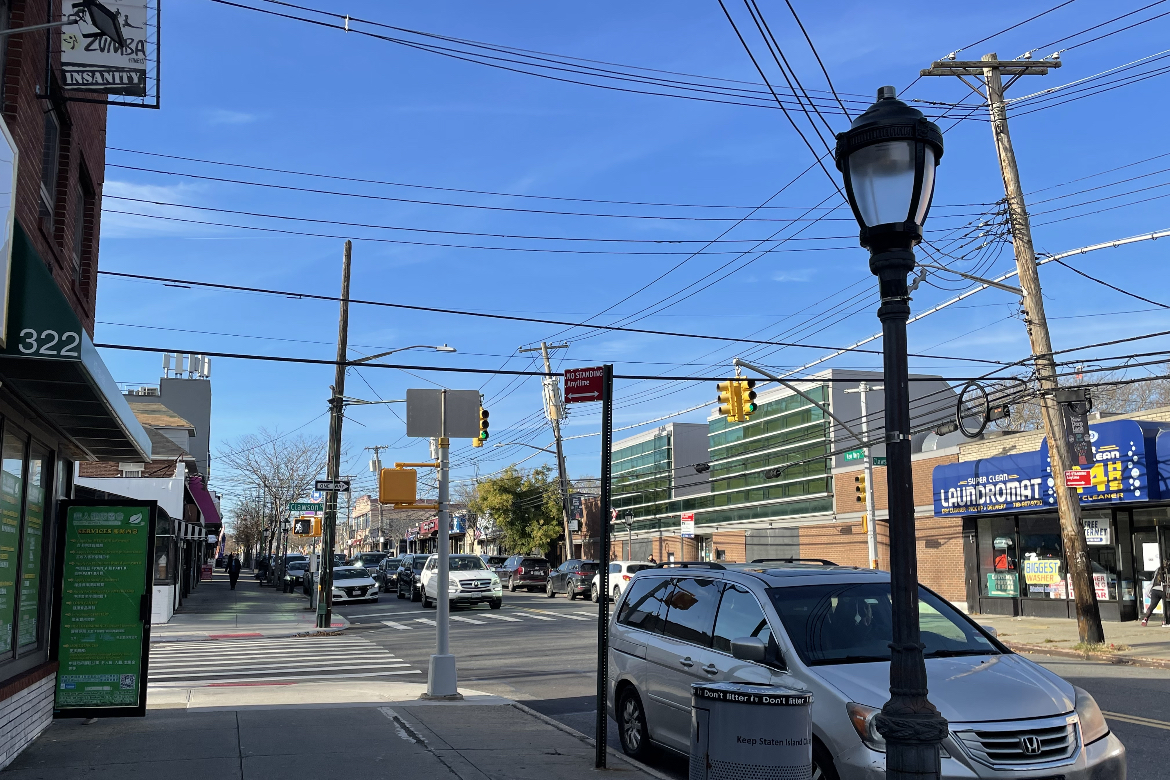
- New Dorp Lane
- Etymology: "new village" in Dutch
- Location in New York City
- Coordinates: 40°34′25″N 74°06′56″W
- Country: United States
- State: New York
- City: New York City
- Borough: Staten Island
- Community District: Staten Island 2
- Established: 1671

Area
  - Total: 2.881 sq mi (7.46 km^{2})

Population (2020)
  - Total: 29,083
  - Density: 10,090/sq mi (3,898/km^{2})

Economics
  - Median income: $80,412
- Time zone: UTC−5 (Eastern)
- ZIP Codes: 10306
- Area code: 718, 347, 929, and 917

New Dorp (/ˈnjuːdɔːrp/ NEW-dorp) is a neighborhood on the South Shore of Staten Island, New York City, United States. New Dorp is bounded by Mill Road on the southeast, Tysens Lane on the southwest, Amboy and Richmond Roads on the northwest, and Bancroft Avenue on the northeast. It is adjacent to Oakwood to the southwest, Todt Hill to the northwest, Dongan Hills and Grant City, and Midland Beach and Miller Field to the southeast. New Dorp Beach, bordering to the east, is often listed on maps as a separate neighborhood from Mill Road to the shore of Lower New York Bay, but is generally considered to be a part of New Dorp.

One of the earliest European settlements in the New York City area, New Dorp was founded by Dutch settlers from the New Netherland colony, and the name is an anglicization of Nieuw Dorp, meaning "New Village" in Dutch. It was historically one of the most important towns on Staten Island, becoming a part of New York City in 1898 as part of the Borough of Richmond. In the 1960s New Dorp ceased to be a distinct town during New York City's suburbanization, where rapid housing development on Staten Island saw the town added to the city conurbation. Despite this, today New Dorp remains one of the main commercial and transport centers on Staten Island.

New Dorp is often associated with the Vanderbilt family, who had a notable presence in the area and many of whom are buried in the neighborhood at the Moravian Cemetery, the largest and oldest active cemetery on Staten Island.

New Dorp is part of Staten Island Community District 2 and its ZIP Code is 10306. New Dorp is patrolled by the 122nd Precinct of the New York City Police Department.

== History ==
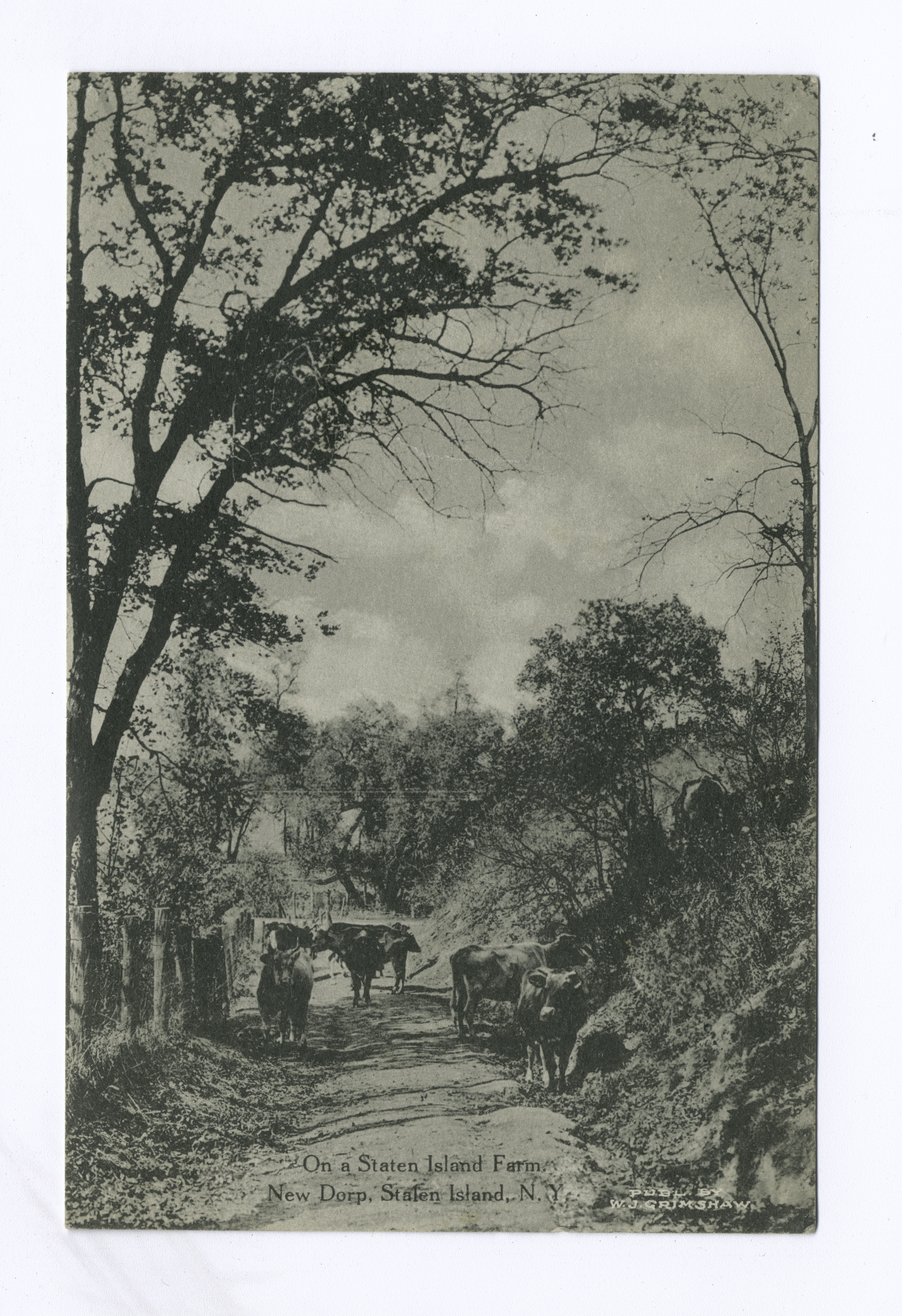
Photograph of cows standing on a dirt path at a farm in New Dorp, reflecting the area's former agricultural character.

New Dorp was the location of the first county seat of Richmond County. Called Stony Brook, it was located approximately where Amboy Road experiences a sharp bend between the New Dorp and Oakwood train stations.

In 1667, at the end of the Second Anglo-Dutch War, the Dutch Republic ceded their colony of New Netherland to England as a condition of the Treaty of Breda. The colony had been occupied by the English since 1664, and was re-branded as the Province of New York when it was granted as a proprietary colony to James, Duke of York. The areas of New Netherland already settled by the Dutch included the primary settlement of New Amsterdam (now renamed New York City) located at the southern tip of Manhattan Island, and numerous additional lands around the city and along the Hudson River. This included Staaten Eylandt, later anglicized as "Staten Island", a sparsely populated island south-west of New York across Upper New York Bay. In 1670, the local Native Americans, mainly Raritans and other subgroups of the Lenape tribe, ceded all claims to Staten Island to the English in a deed to Governor Francis Lovelace.

New Dorp was founded in 1671 following the English resurveying the pre-existing Dutch settlement of Oude Dorp (now Old Town) and expanded the lots along the South Shore, which were then settled primarily by Dutch families. The new lots became known as Nieuwe Dorp (meaning "New Village" in the Dutch language), in contrast with Oude Dorp (meaning "Old Village"), and later became anglicized as New Dorp. The new village developed into one of the largest and most important settlements on Staten Island, and during the American Revolution it became a center of activity when it was occupied by British forces in preparation to attack the American-occupied New York City. The Rose and Crown Tavern in New Dorp, owned by the uncle of Cornelius Vanderbilt, temporarily served as the local British military headquarters.

In the late 19th century, New Dorp became the home to members of the prominent Vanderbilt family, many of whom are buried in the Moravian Cemetery, the largest and oldest active cemetery on Staten Island. On January 1, 1898, New Dorp was consolidated as part of New York City along with the entirety of Staten Island as the Borough of Richmond. The Vanderbilt farm was later used by the U.S. Army as Miller Air Field, and in the 1970s became part of Gateway National Recreation Area. New Dorp continued to be one of the primary settlements on Staten Island until the 1960s, when the suburbanization of New York City began to expand into the island. The largely rural character of Staten Island was replaced with the massive development of suburban housing, causing separate towns such as New Dorp to be absorbed into New York City's conurbation and become one of many contiguous neighborhoods. New Dorp retained its distinct character as a town, and is one of the most thriving commercial centers on the Island which in the 1960s spread along Hylan Boulevard from New Dorp Lane and led to the construction of five shopping centers, anchored by supermarkets and department stores, with the largest being Hylan Plaza which opened in 1966.

The 1960 New York mid-air collision, where 134 people were killed and held the highest death toll for a commercial aviation accident until 1968, occurred over New Dorp.

== Government and politics ==
=== Demographics ===
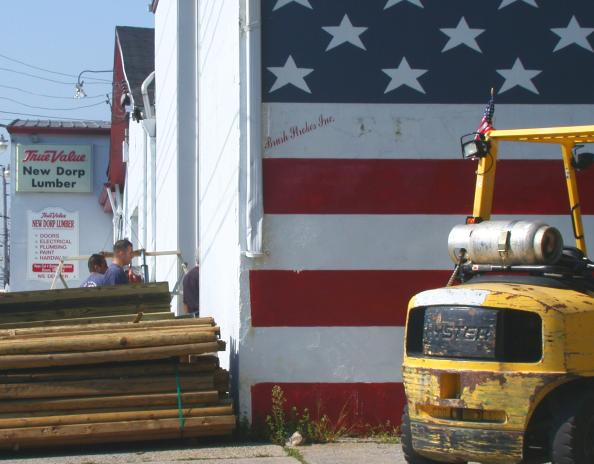
Workers enter a True Value lumberyard in New Dorp. The lumberyard shut down in 2009.

For census purposes, the New York City Department of City Planning classifies New Dorp as part of a larger Neighborhood Tabulation Area called New Dorp-Midland Beach SI0202. This designated neighborhood had 29,083 inhabitants based on data from the 2020 United States Census. This was an increase of 1,460 persons (5.3%) from the 27,623 counted in 2010. The neighborhood had a population density of 20.4 inhabitants per acre (14,500/sq mi; 5,600/km^{2}).

The racial makeup of the neighborhood was 65.8% (19,149) White (Non-Hispanic), 1.5% (432) Black (Non-Hispanic), 15.5% (4,507) Asian, and 2.7% (774) from two or more races. Hispanic or Latino of any race were 14.5% (4,221) of the population.

According to the 2020 United States Census, this area has many cultural communities of over 1,000 inhabitants. This include residents who identify as Mexican, Puerto Rican, Albanian, German, Irish, Italian, Polish, Russian, and Chinese.

The largest age group was people 50-64 years old, which made up 22.6% of the residents. 72.6% of the households had at least one family present. Out of the 10,148 households, 51.6% had a married couple (20.6% with a child under 18), 5.2% had a cohabiting couple (1.9% with a child under 18), 17.1% had a single male (1.2% with a child under 18), and 26.1% had a single female (3.9% with a child under 18). 31.8% of households had children under 18. In this neighborhood, 70.2% of non-vacant housing units are renter-occupied.

The entirety of Community District 2, which comprises New Dorp and other Mid-Island neighborhoods, had 134,657 inhabitants as of NYC Health's 2018 Community Health Profile, with an average life expectancy of 81.2 years. This is the same as the median life expectancy of 81.2 for all New York City neighborhoods. Most inhabitants are youth and middle-aged adults: 20% are between the ages of between 0–17, 25% between 25 and 44, and 29% between 45 and 64. The ratio of college-aged and elderly residents was lower, at 8% and 18% respectively.

As of 2017, the median household income in Community District 2 was $81,487, though the median income in South Beach individually was $80,412. In 2018, an estimated 14% of New Dorp and Mid-Island residents lived in poverty, compared to 17% in all of Staten Island and 20% in all of New York City. One in sixteen residents (6%) were unemployed, compared to 6% in Staten Island and 9% in New York City. Rent burden, or the percentage of residents who have difficulty paying their rent, is 52% in New Dorp and Mid-Island, compared to the boroughwide and citywide rates of 49% and 51% respectively. Based on this calculation, as of 2018, New Dorp and Mid-Island are considered high-income relative to the rest of the city and not gentrifying.

==== Staten Island Chinatown Emerging ====
In 2024, some reports came out that there has been an increasing influx of Chinese homeowners moving into the neighborhood particularly New Dorp Lane and some even calling this the Staten Island Chinatown. There has been an increasing influx of authentic Chinese owned businesses opening up from professional and educational services, food stores, eateries, pharmacies, and H&L Supermarket opened up on Hylan Boulevard as a large Chinese supermarket to cater to the growing Chinese population.

== Entertainment ==
The Lane Theater in New Dorp opened on February 10, 1938, playing One Hundred Men and a Girl as its first feature film. Charles, Lewis and Elias Moses, who operated theaters on Staten Island under the name "Isle Theatrical" had John Eberson design an "atmospheric theater" using lighting, projecting images, and an impressive painted ceiling. The facility cost about $100,000 to build, had seating for 600 people, the latest RCA sound system, and was cooled by refrigeration.

The structure was remodeled in 1977 with a new seating capacity of 550. Attendance dropped with the opening of UA Movies of Staten Island in Travis in 1987, which boasted 10 screens showing the latest new releases, and it closed a year later. In 1988 a landmark designation report was submitted describing the Lane Theater as "one of the last surviving pre-World War II movie theater interiors on Staten Island, and one of the few known largely intact examples of the Depression-era, Art Moderne style theater interior in New York City." The theater's interior was landmarked in November 1988. Starting in 1998, several concerts were hosted including one by a young Eminem. "The EleMent" nightclub opened and eventually closed in 2001 in the building.

In the summer of 2009 renovations were performed and Uncle Vinnies Comedy Club opened. The club closed in April 2011. In 2012 the building became the home of the Crossroads Church.

== Police and crime ==
New Dorp and Mid-Island are patrolled by the 122nd Precinct of the NYPD, located at 2320 Hylan Boulevard. The 122nd Precinct ranked 2nd safest out of 69 patrol areas for per-capita crime in 2010, behind only the 123rd Precinct on Staten Island's South Shore. As of 2018, with a non-fatal assault rate of 40 per 100,000 people, New Dorp and Mid-Island's rate of violent crimes per capita is less than that of the city as a whole. The incarceration rate of 253 per 100,000 people is lower than that of the city as a whole.

The 122nd Precinct has a substantially lower crime rate than in the 1990s, with crimes across all categories having decreased by 88.3% between 1990 and 2022. The precinct reported one murder, eight rapes, 63 robberies, 128 felony assaults, 91 burglaries, 373 grand larcenies, and 136 grand larcenies auto in 2022.

== Fire safety ==
New Dorp is served by the New York City Fire Department (FDNY)'s Engine Company 165/Ladder Company 85, located at 3067 Richmond Road. Engine Company 165 is the only Engine Company in Staten Island that has clothing to deal with hazardous materials, and it also has extra hazmat training.

== Health ==
As of 2018, preterm births and births to teenage mothers are less common in New Dorp and Mid-Island than in other places citywide. In New Dorp and Mid-Island, there were 80 preterm births per 1,000 live births (compared to 87 per 1,000 citywide), and 6.8 births to teenage mothers per 1,000 live births (compared to 19.3 per 1,000 citywide). New Dorp and Mid-Island have a low population of residents who are uninsured. In 2018, this population of uninsured residents was estimated to be 4%, less than the citywide rate of 12%, though this was based on a small sample size.

The concentration of fine particulate matter, the deadliest type of air pollutant, in New Dorp and Mid-Island is 0.0069 milligrams per cubic metre (6.9×10^{−9} oz/ft^{3}), less than the city average. Fourteen percent of New Dorp and Mid-Island residents are smokers, which is the same as the city average of 14% of residents being smokers. In New Dorp and Mid-Island, 24% of residents are obese, 9% are diabetic, and 26% have high blood pressure—compared to the citywide averages of 24%, 11%, and 28% respectively. In addition, 19% of children are obese, compared to the citywide average of 20%.

Eighty-eight percent of residents eat some fruits and vegetables every day, which is about the same as the city's average of 87%. In 2018, 76% of residents described their health as "good", "very good", or "excellent", slightly less than the city's average of 78%. For every supermarket in New Dorp and Mid-Island, there are 7 bodegas.

The nearest major hospital is Staten Island University Hospital in South Beach.

== Post office and ZIP Code ==
New Dorp is located within the ZIP Code 10306. The United States Postal Service operates the New Dorp Station post office at 2562 Hylan Boulevard.

== Parks ==
Dugan Park (Gerard P. Dugan Playground) is a large park in New Dorp, named after a civic association president when it was renovated in 1974. The park is often referred to as "Tysens Park" due to the park's location on an intersection of Tysens Lane. The accompanying Tysens Park Apartments, a large housing complex, stands across the street from the park. The park is usually crowded with people from nearby schools as well as people from the apartments nearby. The park contains a large field with 2 baseball/soft fields where leagues come play almost every weekend during the summer. There are 2 basketball courts, handball courts and jungle gyms.

== Education ==
New Dorp and Mid-Island generally have a similar rate of college-educated residents to the rest of the city as of 2018. While 40% of residents age 25 and older have a college education or higher, 11% have less than a high school education and 49% are high school graduates or have some college education. By contrast, 39% of Staten Island residents and 43% of city residents have a college education or higher. The percentage of New Dorp and Mid-Island students excelling in math rose from 49% in 2000 to 65% in 2011, though reading achievement declined from 55% to 52% during the same time period.

New Dorp and Mid-Island's rate of elementary school student absenteeism is lower than the rest of New York City. In New Dorp and Mid-Island, 15% of elementary school students missed twenty or more days per school year, less than the citywide average of 20%. Additionally, 87% of high school students in New Dorp and Mid-Island graduate on time, more than the citywide average of 75%.

=== Schools ===
The New York City Department of Education operates the following public schools near New Dorp:

- PS 41 New Dorp (grades PK-5)
- New Dorp High School (grades 9–12)
- Staten Island Technical High School (grades 9–12)

=== Library ===
The New York Public Library (NYPL)'s New Dorp branch at 309 New Dorp Lane, is one of the busiest libraries on Staten Island. The one-story branch was established by local residentsand opened in 1907 as the New Dorp Community Library. While the NYPL started providing books to the New Dorp branch through its Bookmobile program in 1909, the branch did not become an NYPL branch until 1926. The branch was renovated in 2000.

==== Temporary closures ====
The New Dorp branch has been closed temporarily since the end of summer 2024 to make $5M renovations, including heating, ventilation, air conditioning systems, and roof reconstruction.

== Transportation ==
New Dorp is served by the Staten Island Railway's New Dorp station at New Dorp Lane and New Dorp Plaza. New Dorp is also served by numerous express and local bus routes. This includes the S57, S74, S76, S78, S84 and S86 local and limited buses, the S79 Select Bus Service bus, and the SIM1, SIM5, SIM6, SIM7, SIM9, SIM10 and SIM11 express buses.

== Notable residents ==
- Nathaniel Lord Britton, botanist and first director of the New York Botanical Garden, born in New Dorp Beach. The Britton Cottage, a 17th Century house owned by Britton, was relocated from New Dorp Lane and Cedar Grove Avenue and is now preserved at nearby Historic Richmond Town.
- Gustav A. Mayer, confectioner and the inventor of the Nilla wafer, lived in a mansion in New Dorp, on St. Stephens Pl.
- Jacques Reich, portrait etcher, lived in New Dorp.
- Eddie Kaye Thomas, actor, lived in New Dorp growing up.
- George Washington Vanderbilt II, born in New Dorp, a descendant of Cornelius "Commodore" Vanderbilt, who in 1836 began purchasing farmland in New Dorp and owned most of what became Miller Field by 1843; George Vanderbilt II became owner of the property in 1885, and used the "White House" on the land as an occasional residence until his death in 1914.
- Susan Molinari, former city councilwoman and congresswoman
- Robert Funaro, actor known for his portrayal of Eugene Pontecorvo in The Sopranos
- Bobby Gustafson, former lead guitarist of thrash metal band Overkill.
