= The Old Britton House =

Coordinates: 40.569°N 74.125°W

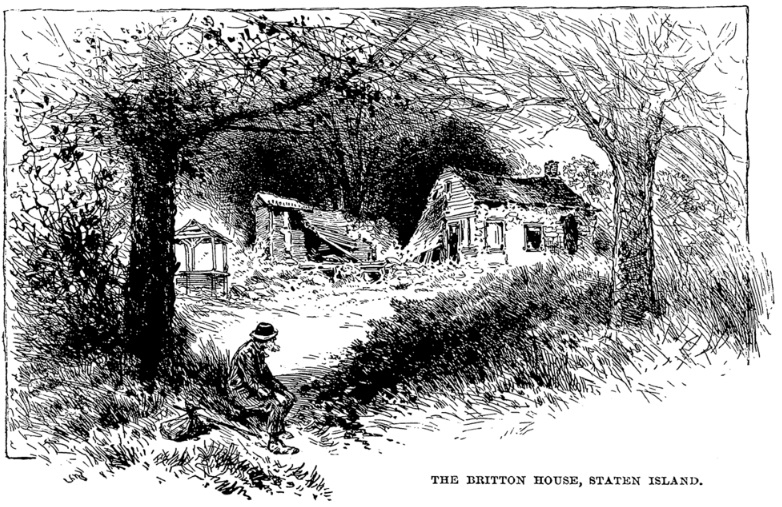
The Old Britton House

The Old Britton House was a house located on the western side of Amboy Road almost directly opposite of Tysens Lane in the New Dorp Beach section of Staten Island, New York. At one time, it was one of the oldest structures on Staten Island. Built between 1650 and 1680 by a Huguenot refugee, the house was the site of an Indian massacre, the headquarters for a Hessian commander during the American Revolutionary War, a smallpox hospital and a colonial courthouse. It was demolished in 1896 and the stones that formed the walls were crushed up into macadam.

== Alleged haunting ==
The area around the house was said to be haunted by shadows. After midnight, it was said that a reenactment of the Indian massacre would take place. The sounds of the English family's screams could be heard along with the yells of the attacking Indians.
