= South Beach, Staten Island =

Neighborhood in New York City

South Beach
- Neighborhood of Staten Island
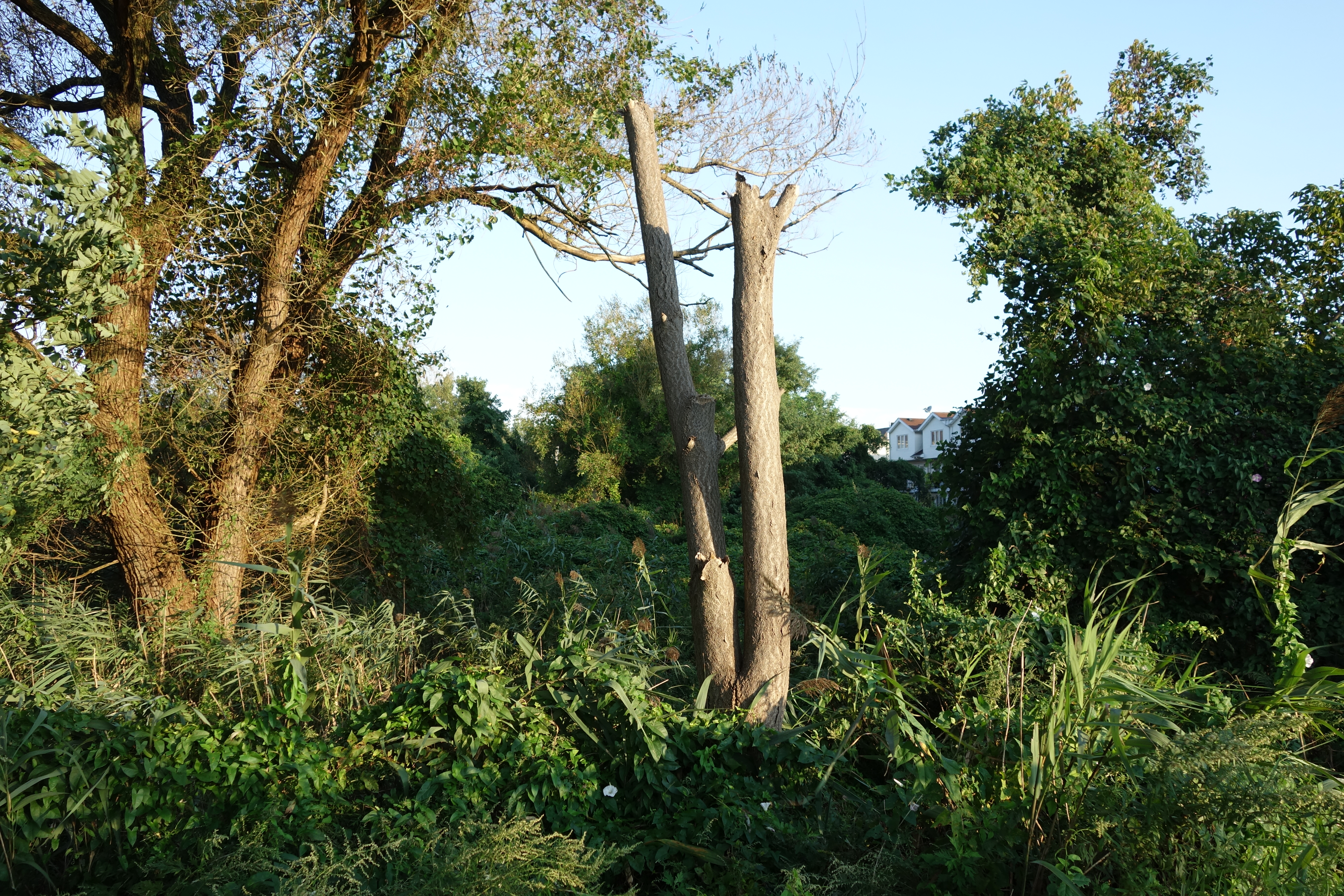
- South Beach Wetlands
- Location in New York City
- Coordinates: 40.590°N 74.067°W
- Country: United States
- State: New York
- City: New York City
- Borough: Staten Island
- Community District: Staten Island 2

Area
  - Total: 0.903 sq mi (2.34 km^{2})

Population (2020)
  - Total: 36,259
  - Density: 40,200/sq mi (15,500/km^{2})
- Neighborhood tabulation area

Economics
  - Median income: $80,361
- ZIP Codes: 10305
- Area code: 718, 347, 929, and 917

South Beach is a neighborhood on the East Shore of Staten Island, New York City, situated directly south of the Verrazzano–Narrows Bridge. South Beach is bounded by New York Bay on the southeast, Seaview Avenue on the southwest, Laconia Avenue on the northwest, Reid and McClean Avenues on the north, and Lily Pond Avenue on the northeast. It is adjacent to Midland Beach to the southwest, Dongan Hills and Old Town/Concord to the northwest, and Fort Wadsworth and Rosebank to the northeast.

South Beach contains a boardwalk with an eponymous beach on its southeastern coast. Directly east of the beach are two small islands, Hoffman Island and Swinburne Island. The northern part of South Beach is sometimes known as Arrochar.

South Beach is part of Staten Island Community District 2 and its ZIP Code is 10305. South Beach is patrolled by the 122nd Precinct of the New York City Police Department.

== History ==
Once referred to as Graham Beach, the area was originally a summer beach colony consisting of many bungalows and tents. Located nearby was Warren Manor, a residential development that was demolished in the 1950s to make way for a proposed new City University of New York campus that was never built. By the early 20th century, many Italian-Americans, including immigrants, settled in the neighborhood, and their descendants still form the majority of the community's population.

=== Resort years ===
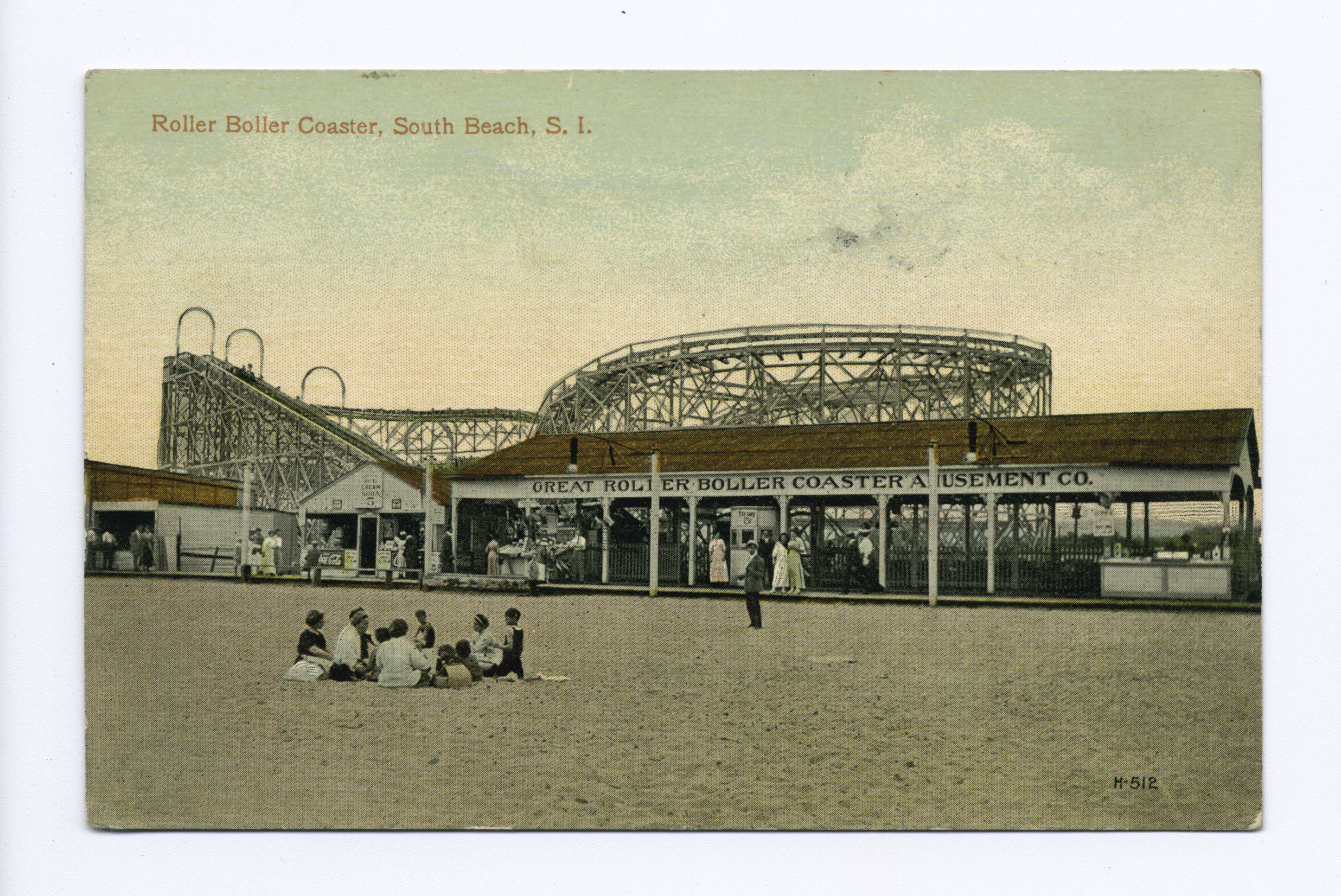
The Roller Boller Coaster (1907–1917) was one of several coasters to be built in South Beach

By the mid-1880s, South Beach's amusement area consisted of a 1,700-foot (520 m) boardwalk, a carousel, a Noah's Ark ride, beer gardens, as well as games of chance and other suspicious game booths. However, the beach was still the most popular activity in the area, and picnicking was a common activity. As a result of reforms in 1890, these questionable game booths had been removed and bathing kiosks had been built in their place. Much of the area was destroyed by a fire in September 1896 that destroyed a third of the boardwalk, as well as numerous hotels and businesses, two hundred bathhouses, a carousel, and a photo gallery. Many of the hotels could not feasibly be rebuilt, as the leases expired in one and a half years. LaMarcus Adna Thompson built one of his Scenic Railway roller coasters in South Beach in 1899, though that only lasted four years. Another large fire swept the area in 1902.

The 15-acre (6.1 ha) Happyland Amusement Park, an enclosed park with numerous attractions and landscape features, opened on June 30, 1906, to a crowd of 30,000 people. Upon its opening, the park contained a beachfront of 1,000 feet (300 m), a 1,500-foot (460 m) pier, and a 30-foot-wide (9.1 m) boardwalk, as well as a system of over 10,000 lights. The park's rides included a circle swing, a Magnetic House, a Foolish House, a L.A. Thompson miniature railroad, an airship ride, a carousel, a Shoot the Chute, a revolving 190-foot-tall (58 m) tower. One source adds that "fortune tellers, card printers, and photography studios" began to open very close to the park.

Other entertainment at Happyland included continuous vaudeville, a ballroom, bandstand, roller rink, shooting galleries, and penny arcades. More passive features included a Japanese garden, picnic areas, landscaped groves, and Venetian style canals. The stage productions and Vaudeville shows were popular in summer when many of the theatres on Broadway were closed. Patrons could watch the shows or listen to music for free, and the park gave visitors "pass-out checks" so they could return later in the day without paying another fee. Competitions such as a "baby contest" and a schoolchildren's contest were held at Happyland, and by mid-1907 the park was seeing 20,000 patrons each summer weekends.

One noteworthy incident in the 1907 season concerned the aviator Lincoln Beachey, who made two flights a day between Happyland and Manhattan for ten days in June 1907. On one of these flights, his plane's propeller got tangled with a balloon, and he was able to land safely in the East River near Randalls and Wards Islands.

The amusement park continued to operate through the 1910s, with the addition of a Chinese show. By 1909, the park's admission had been repealed, and numerous independent amusements had been built adjacent to Happyland, including photograph studios, fortune tellers, two dance halls, a souvenir shop, card-printers, and several games. Also built were numerous roller coasters, including a wooden roller coaster called Roller Boller Coaster. In 1919 the amusement area was damaged by a large fire that killed one woman, destroyed 40 buildings, and caused up to $200,000 in damage.

Happyland was rebuilt, but never regained the prestige that it had in its earlier years. Five suspicious fires in 1929, set on consecutive Sunday afternoons, destroyed several hotels and bathhouses as well as the boardwalk. Much of the resort was razed in the mid-1930s to create the South Beach–Franklin Delano Roosevelt Boardwalk, which opened in 1937. One remnant of the amusement area, the 1-acre (0.40 ha) South Beach Amusement Park at the northern end of South Beach, continued to operate through the end of the 20th century, though much of that park was destroyed in 1955. Beachland Amusements, an adjacent amusement arcade, operated from 1941 to 2006 and was the last amusement attraction on the South Beach–Franklin Delano Roosevelt Boardwalk. It relocated to Sand Lane in 1953 after the city banned commercial businesses from the boardwalk.

=== Residential neighborhood ===
The City of New York built a public housing project in the neighborhood in 1949; it is one of three such developments south of the Staten Island Expressway. Service on the South Beach Branch was halted in 1953; by the 1980s the tracks of this line had been removed, and tract homes now stand on the original right-of-way in most places. Today, Railroad Avenue's name, the Robin Road Trestle, and the street grid are the only remaining pieces of evidence.

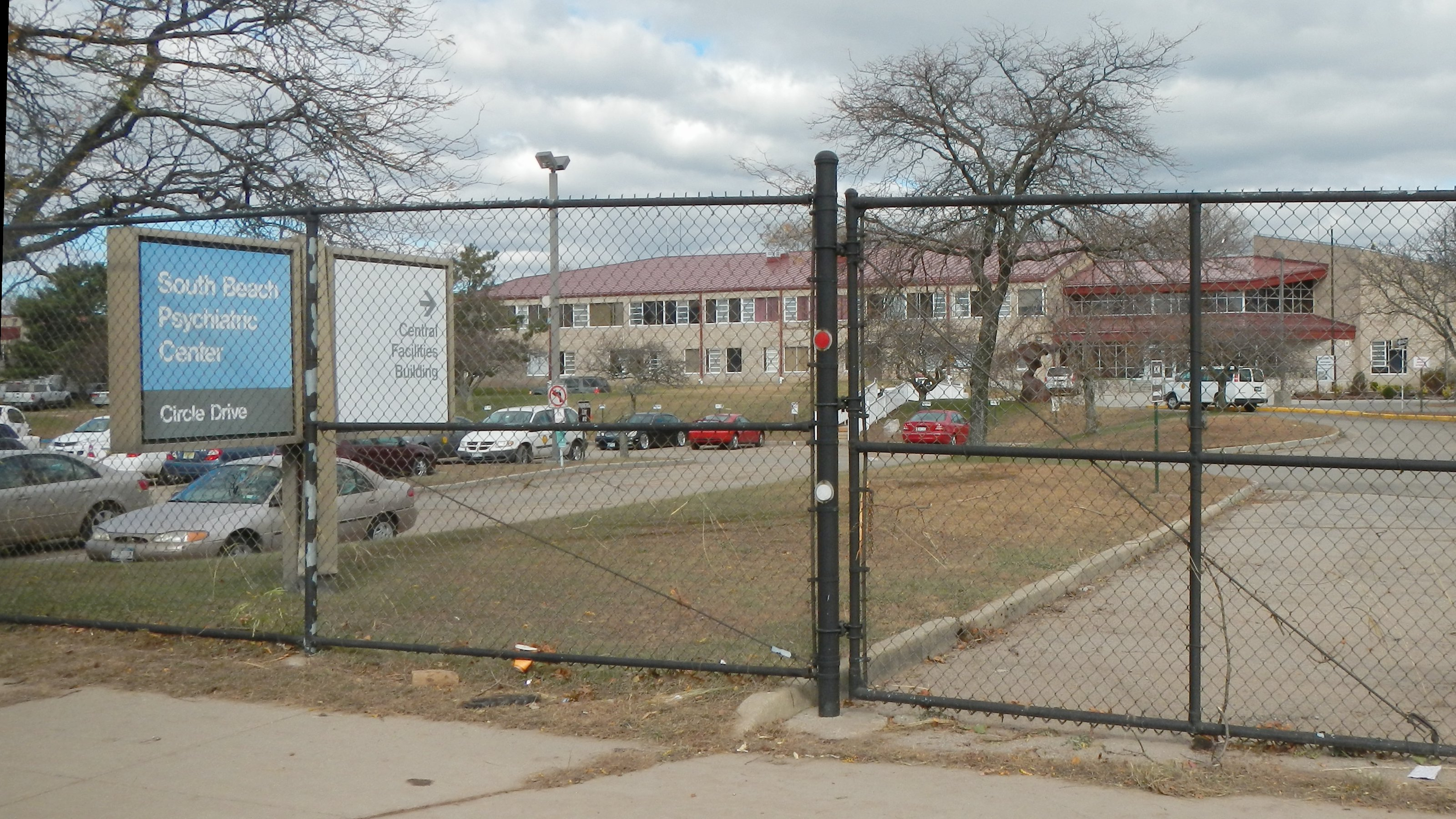
South Beach Psychiatric Center

The neighborhood's principal thoroughfare was originally named Seaside Boulevard, which ran parallel to the shoreline, with the South Beach Boardwalk flanking it on the shoreward side. This roadway, which was the only portion of the "Shore Front Drive" proposed by Robert Moses to be actually built, was later renamed Father Capodanno Boulevard, after a Roman Catholic chaplain who was killed in action during the Vietnam War, and runs from near the Verrazzano–Narrows Bridge to Midland Beach.

Two hospitals, one an acute-care facility (the North Campus of Staten Island University Hospital), the other a state-run hospital for the mentally ill (the South Beach Psychiatric Center), where reports of mysterious deaths of juvenile patients originated during the later 20th century, stand at the southern edge of the neighborhood (sometimes reckoned as the separate locality. The location of the two hospitals was marshland as recently as the 1960s. What is now the Staten Island University Hospital was later constructed on part of the former Warren Manor property; Staten Island Hospital was relocated to the site from New Brighton in 1979; in 1989 this hospital merged with Richmond Memorial Hospital in Prince's Bay to form Staten Island University Hospital. Immediately to the east of Staten Island University Hospital is the South Beach Psychiatric Center, a state institution for the mentally ill which opened shortly after the aforementioned hospital did. Wild turkeys appeared on and near the grounds of this facility in the 1990s, and have since multiplied and spread to other Staten Island neighborhoods, having been sighted as far away as West Brighton on the island's central North Shore.

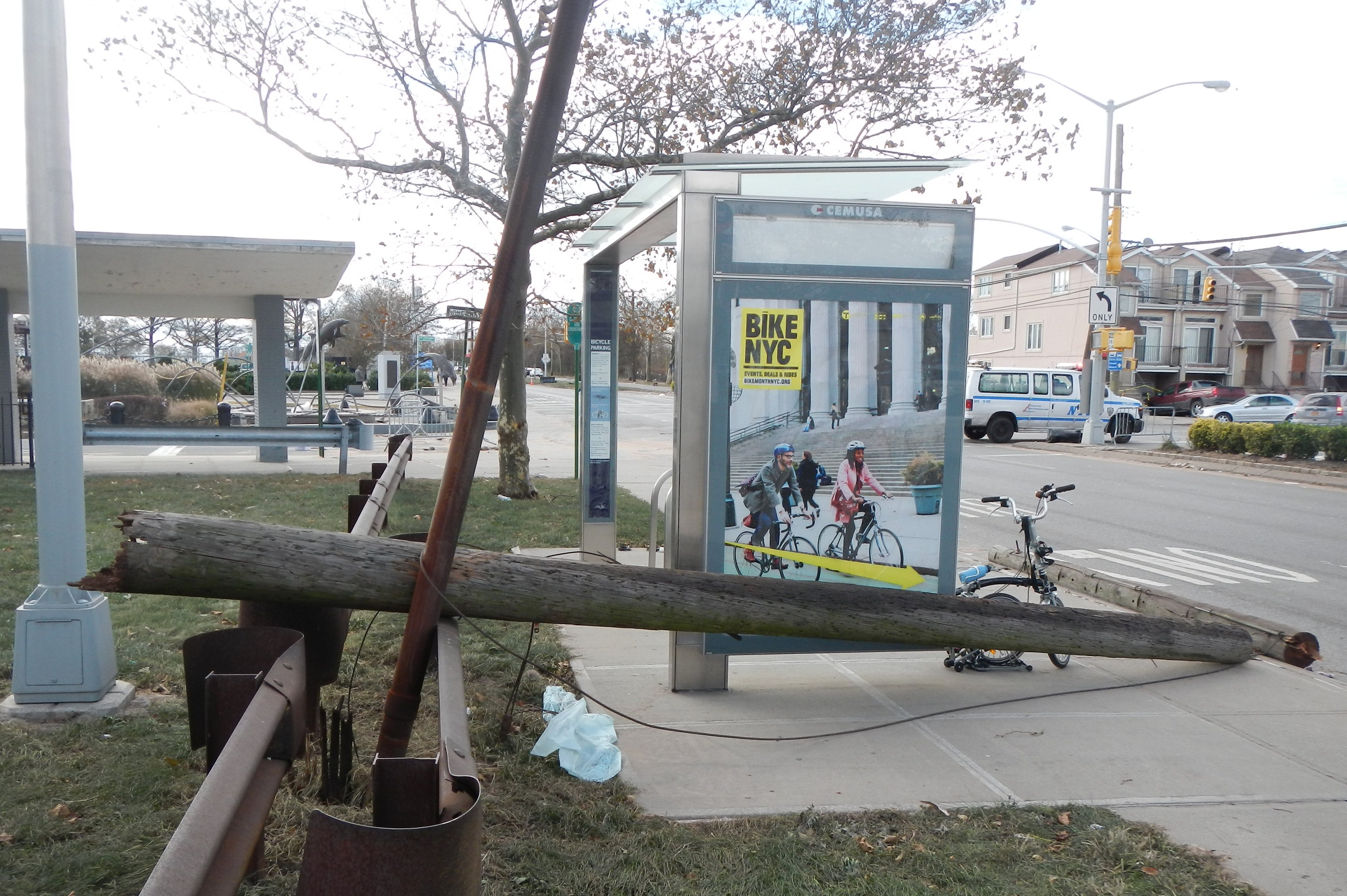
Utility pole smashed by Hurricane Sandy

During Hurricane Sandy in 2012, much of South Beach was flooded and several homes were damaged. Many local homeowners later elected to buy out their homes to be demolished, although some residents planned on staying. A 9,600-square-foot (890 m^{2}) Key Food supermarket opened on the Beachland Amusements site in August 2013.

== Topography ==
The southernmost tip of South Beach is called Ocean Breeze. Situated in a low-lying coastal area, Ocean Breeze often experiences the worst flood-related damage in all of Staten Island after heavy rain has fallen, and many of the neighborhood's side streets become impassable. Because of the flooding that results from the low-lying terrain, the New Creek bluebelt, which collects rainwater after storms, runs through the area.

== Demographics ==
For census purposes, the New York City Department of City Planning classifies South Beach as part of a larger Neighborhood Tabulation Area called Grasmere-Arrochar-South Beach-Dongan Hills SI0201. This designated neighborhood had 36,259 inhabitants based on data from the 2020 United States Census. This was an increase of 1,834 persons (5.3%) from the 34,425 counted in 2010. The neighborhood had a population density of 19.9 inhabitants per acre (14,500/sq mi; 5,600/km^{2}).

The racial makeup of the neighborhood was 57.7% (20,914) White (Non-Hispanic), 5.0% (1,828) Black (Non-Hispanic), 17.9% (6,499) Asian, and 2.7% (979) from two or more races. Hispanic or Latino of any race were 16.7% (6,039) of the population.

According to the 2020 United States Census, this area has many cultural communities of over 1,000 inhabitants. This include residents who identify as Mexican, Puerto Rican, Albanian, German, Irish, Italian, Polish, Russian, African-American, and Chinese.

The largest age group was people 50-64 years old, which made up 22.4% of the residents. 70.0% of the households had at least one family present. Out of the 12,811 households, 46.4% had a married couple (18.2% with a child under 18), 4.4% had a cohabiting couple (1.7% with a child under 18), 19.1% had a single male (1.7% with a child under 18), and 30.1% had a single female (5.3% with a child under 18). 31.6% of households had children under 18. In this neighborhood, 42.8% of non-vacant housing units are renter-occupied.

The entirety of Community District 2, which comprises South Beach and other Mid-Island neighborhoods, had 134,657 inhabitants as of NYC Health's 2018 Community Health Profile, with an average life expectancy of 81.2 years. This is the same as the median life expectancy of 81.2 for all New York City neighborhoods. Most inhabitants are youth and middle-aged adults: 20% are between the ages of between 0–17, 25% between 25 and 44, and 29% between 45 and 64. The ratio of college-aged and elderly residents was lower, at 8% and 18% respectively.

As of 2017, the median household income in Community District 2 was $81,487, though the median income in South Beach individually was $80,361. In 2018, an estimated 14% of South Beach and Mid-Island residents lived in poverty, compared to 17% in all of Staten Island and 20% in all of New York City. One in sixteen residents (6%) were unemployed, compared to 6% in Staten Island and 9% in New York City. Rent burden, or the percentage of residents who have difficulty paying their rent, is 52% in South Beach and Mid-Island, compared to the boroughwide and citywide rates of 49% and 51% respectively. Based on this calculation, as of 2018, South Beach and Mid-Island are considered high-income relative to the rest of the city and not gentrifying.

== Police and crime ==
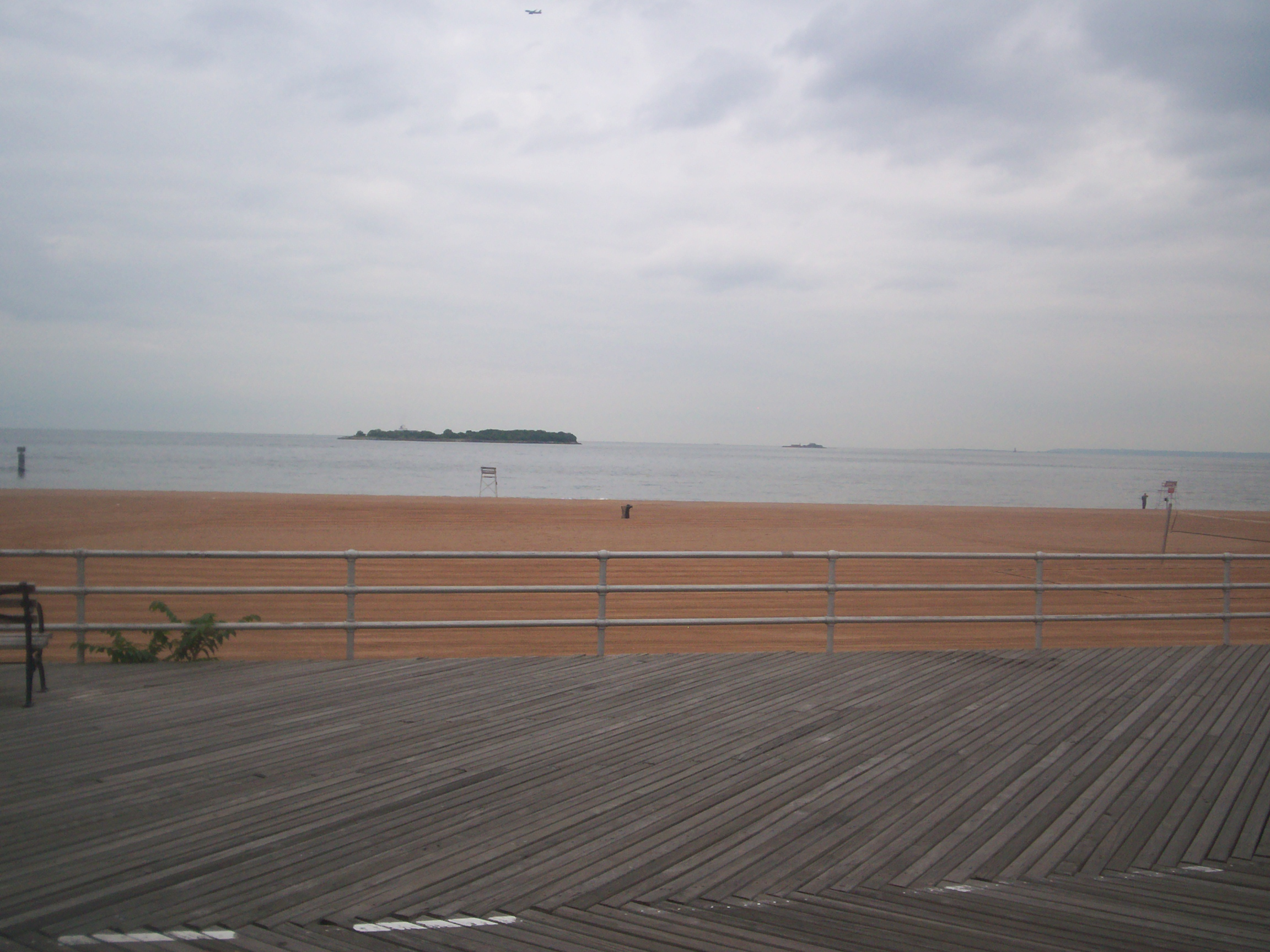
Hoffman Island on left and Swinburne Island on the right as seen from the boardwalk at South Beach

South Beach and Mid-Island are patrolled by the 122nd Precinct of the NYPD, located at 2320 Hylan Boulevard. The 122nd Precinct ranked 2nd safest out of 69 patrol areas for per-capita crime in 2010, behind only the 123rd Precinct on Staten Island's South Shore. As of 2018, with a non-fatal assault rate of 40 per 100,000 people, South Beach and Mid-Island's rate of violent crimes per capita is less than that of the city as a whole. The incarceration rate of 253 per 100,000 people is lower than that of the city as a whole.

The 122nd Precinct has a substantially lower crime rate than in the 1990s, with crimes across all categories having decreased by 88.3% between 1990 and 2022. The precinct reported one murder, eight rapes, 63 robberies, 128 felony assaults, 91 burglaries, 373 grand larcenies, and 136 grand larcenies auto in 2022.

== Fire safety ==
South Beach is served by the New York City Fire Department (FDNY)'s Engine Co. 161/Ladder Co. 81, located at 278 McClean Avenue.

== Health ==
As of 2018, preterm births and births to teenage mothers are less common in South Beach and Mid-Island than in other places citywide. In South Beach and Mid-Island, there were 80 preterm births per 1,000 live births (compared to 87 per 1,000 citywide), and 6.8 births to teenage mothers per 1,000 live births (compared to 19.3 per 1,000 citywide). South Beach and Mid-Island have a low population of residents who are uninsured. In 2018, this population of uninsured residents was estimated to be 4%, less than the citywide rate of 12%, though this was based on a small sample size.

The concentration of fine particulate matter, the deadliest type of air pollutant, in South Beach and Mid-Island is 0.0069 milligrams per cubic metre (6.9×10^{−9} oz/ft^{3}), less than the city average. Fourteen percent of South Beach and Mid-Island residents are smokers, which is the same as the city average of 14% of residents being smokers. In South Beach and Mid-Island, 24% of residents are obese, 9% are diabetic, and 26% have high blood pressure—compared to the citywide averages of 24%, 11%, and 28% respectively. In addition, 19% of children are obese, compared to the citywide average of 20%.

Eighty-eight percent of residents eat some fruits and vegetables every day, which is about the same as the city's average of 87%. In 2018, 76% of residents described their health as "good", "very good", or "excellent", slightly less than the city's average of 78%. For every supermarket in South Beach and Mid-Island, there are 7 bodegas.

Staten Island University Hospital is located in South Beach.

== Post office and ZIP Code ==
South Beach is located within the ZIP Code 10305. The United States Postal Service does not operate a post office in South Beach, but the nearest post office is Rosebank Station at 567 Tompkins Avenue.

== Education ==
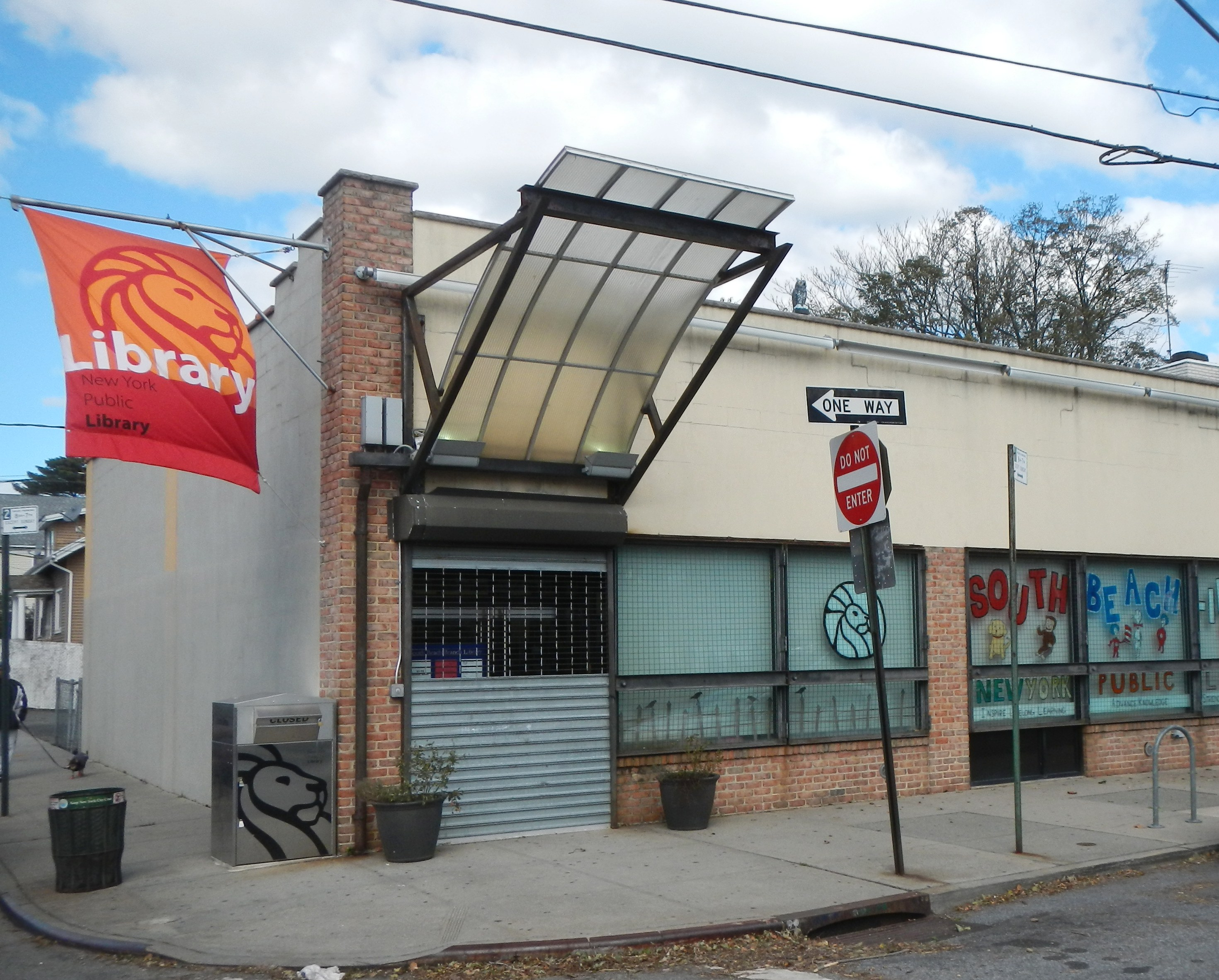
New York Public Library, South Beach branch

South Beach and Mid-Island generally have a similar rate of college-educated residents to the rest of the city as of 2018. While 40% of residents age 25 and older have a college education or higher, 11% have less than a high school education and 49% are high school graduates or have some college education. By contrast, 39% of Staten Island residents and 43% of city residents have a college education or higher. The percentage of South Beach and Mid-Island students excelling in math rose from 49% in 2000 to 65% in 2011, though reading achievement declined from 55% to 52% during the same time period.

South Beach and Mid-Island's rate of elementary school student absenteeism is lower than the rest of New York City. In South Beach and Mid-Island, 15% of elementary school students missed twenty or more days per school year, less than the citywide average of 20%. Additionally, 87% of high school students in South Beach and Mid-Island graduate on time, more than the citywide average of 75%.

=== Schools ===
The New York City Department of Education operates the following public schools in South Beach and Arrochar:

- PS 39 Francis J Murphy Jr (grades K-5)
- PS 46 Albert V Maniscalco (grades PK-5)

=== Library ===
The New York Public Library (NYPL)'s South Beach branch is located at 21–25 Robin Road, near Ocean Avenue and Father Capodanno Boulevard. The branch started operating out of a location on Sand Lane in the mid-20th century, but was destroyed in a 1989 fire. The South Beach branch reopened in 1990 and moved to its current one-story, 3,000-square-foot (280 m^{2}) location on Robin Road in 2000.

== Transportation ==
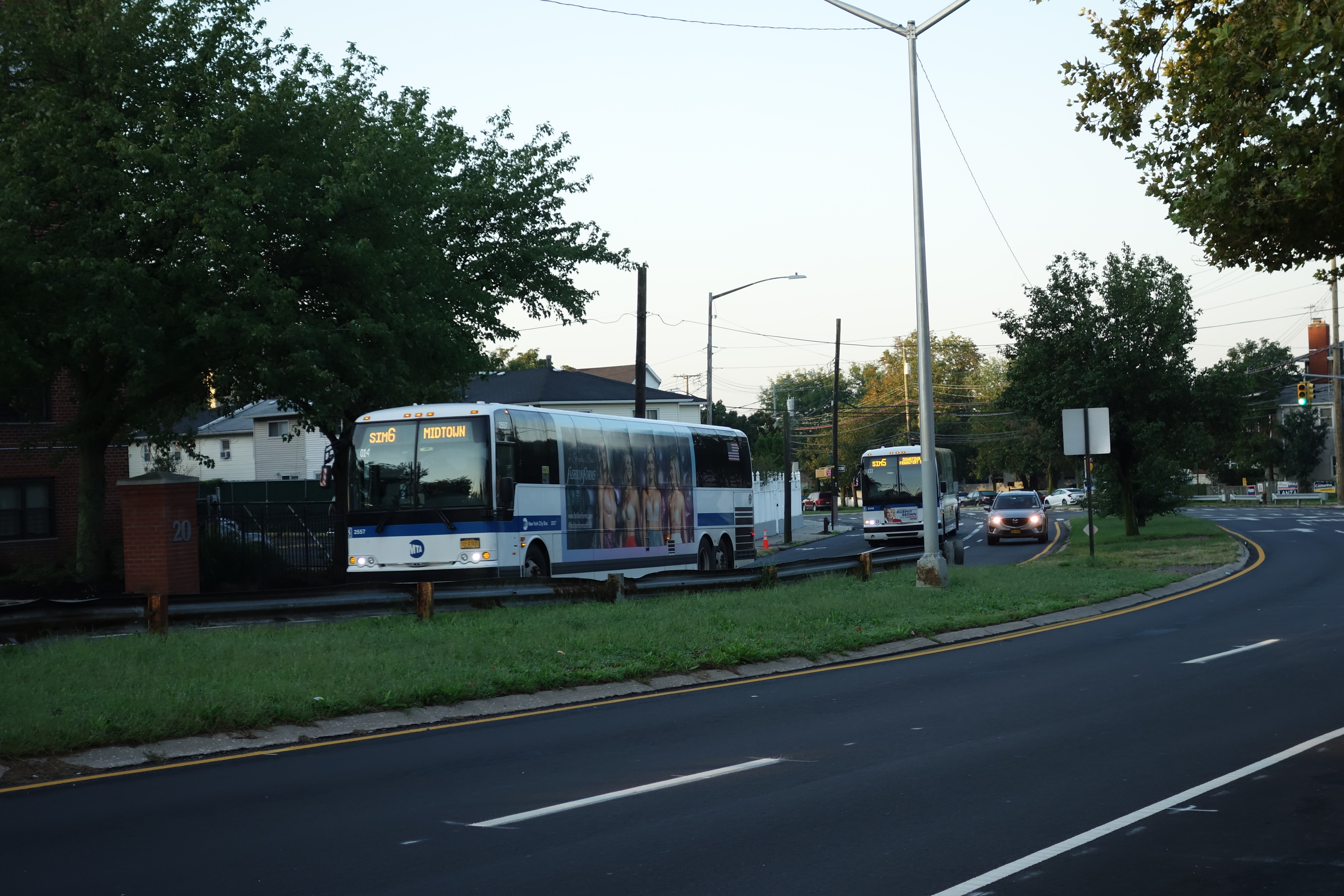
Express bus on Fr. Capodanno Boulevard

South Beach is served by a number of local and express buses. The S78 and S79 SBS local buses and SIM1, SIM1C, SIM7 and SIM10 express buses stop along Hylan Boulevard. The S51, S81 and S52 local buses and SIM5, SIM6 and SIM9 express buses travel along Father Capodanno Boulevard.

South Beach was served by the X20 on its South Side and by the X18 on its North Side, but both were discontinued in 2010 by the MTA due to budget cuts. The SIM5X and SIM6X operated briefly from August to October 2018 due to low ridership. South Beach was also served by the Staten Island Railway's South Beach station until March 31, 1953.
