= Last Chance Pond Park =

Park in Staten Island, New York

- Interactive map of Last Chance Pond Park
- Type: Wetland park
- Location: Staten Island, New York City, U.S.
- Coordinates: 40.5841°N 74.0989°W
- Area: 3.903 acres (1.579 ha)
- Owner: New York City Department of Parks and Recreation
- Status: Open all year
- Water: New Creek stream
- Website: www.nycgovparks.org/parks/last-chance-pond-park/history

Last Chance Pond Park is a wetland park located on Staten Island's East Shore and part of the main channel of the New Creek stream and the Staten Island Bluebelt in New York City. Located on the northeast migration flyway, Last Chance Pond Park hosts a wide range of local flora and fauna that visit and live in the landscape of the park that includes two saltwater marshes, a fresh spring, and a freshwater pond. The park was named after the Last Chance Pond and Wilderness Foundation which helped to preserve the site starting in the mid-1960s.

Before the completion of the Verrazzano–Narrows Bridge, the neighborhood of Dongan Hills contained mostly wetlands, one and two-family detached homes, and garden apartments. The park area had 50 lots that were previously undeveloped wetlands with "no trails or signs indicating the pond's presence." With the bridge opening the residents had concerns about developers "buy[ing] old homes, tear[ing] them down and build[ing] town houses, changing the neighborhood's character."

The Last Chance Pond and Wilderness Foundation was established in the mid 1960 by local residents Lou Caravone and John Mouner to preserve the existing multiplicity-owned wetlands in the face of "rapid, uncheck development." However, at the time more than a third of the lots were owned by New York City and the baseball little league and the New York State Department of Environmental Conservation had temporarily designated the site as a "tidal wetland." Private developers also did not have "serious plans to build on the site" due to the upfront cost to fill and drain the wetland.

With political support, the foundation was able to get the New York State Nature and Historical Preserve Trust (now the New York State Office of Parks, Recreation and Historic Preservation) to purchase land and donate it to the city. As a result, the park was officially established in 1999 with natural woodland, marshes, and a pond.

In 2019, as a part of the funding from Mid-Island Bluebelt Phase II and New Creek Bluebelt project, the pond and wetland areas was rebuilt to provide a natural filter for excess runoff.
