= The Boulevard (Staten Island, New York) =

Coordinates: 40.56668°N 74.11332°W

- Location: New Dorp, Staten Island, New York City, United States
- Address: 2630–2670 Hylan Boulevard; Staten Island, NY 10306
- Opened: 1966
- Manager: Kimco Realty
- Owner: Kimco Realty
- Num. of stores: 11
- Num. of anchor tenants: 1
- Floor area: 356,267 ft²
- Floors: 1
- Parking: 1,507 parking spaces
- Website: theboulevard.shopkimco.com

The Boulevard, formerly Hylan Plaza, is an open-air shopping center in the New Dorp neighborhood of Staten Island, New York City, United States.

== History ==
Hylan Plaza debuted in 1966 with the opening of a Fox Plaza, now United Artists Movie Theater, and a W.T. Grant department store, now Kmart. By 1968 a new Garber Brothers department store, later a Toys "R" Us/Babies "R" Us combination, and a Pathmark supermarket were added as anchors to the shopping center. Toys "R" Us closed in 2006, reopened in 2010, and closed a second time in 2017.

Hylan Plaza went through a major renovation in 2003 which included an expansion and complete remodeling of Pathmark, new grass and tree planted medians, new lampposts, and the closing of several secondary driveways and the causeway to travel between both the main (Hylan Boulevard) and Mill Road parking lots.

Throughout 2015–2017, the tenants closed and or moved in preparation for a new replacement shopping center, named The Boulevard. This center began reopening in 2021 with a ShopRite supermarket. Other tenants opened in 2021 include Marshalls, Old Navy, LA Fitness, and Burlington.
