= Midland Beach, Staten Island =

Neighborhood in New York City

Midland Beach
- Neighborhood of Staten Island
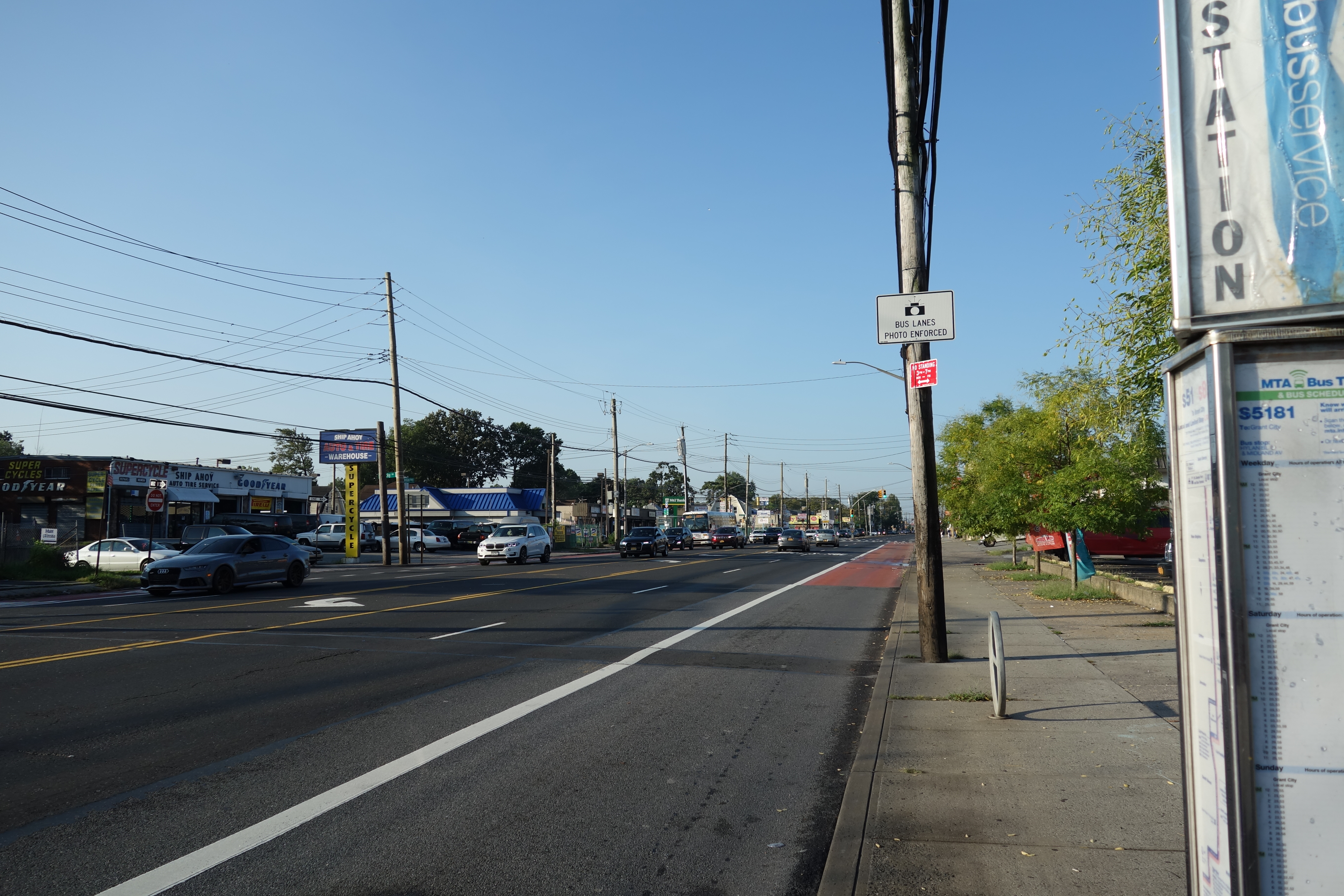
- Hylan Boulevard
- Interactive map of Midland Beach
- Coordinates: 40.573°N 74.094°W
- Country: United States
- State: New York
- City: New York City
- Borough: Staten Island
- Community District: Staten Island 2

Area
  - Total: 2.187 sq mi (5.66 km^{2})

Population (2020)
  - Total: 29,083
  - Density: 13,300/sq mi (5,134/km^{2})
- Neighborhood tabulation area

Economics
  - Median income: $72,868
- ZIP Codes: 10305, 10306
- Area code: 718, 347, 929, and 917

Midland Beach (formerly known as Woodland Beach) is a neighborhood of Staten Island in New York City. It lies along the east-central coast of the island, in the area known locally as the "Mid-Island, Staten Island" or the "East Shore".

To its immediate northwest is Grant City, to the southeast is New Dorp Beach, and to the northeast are Graham Beach and South Beach. Miller Field and Prescott Avenue form the southwest border (formerly, a lane called Maplewood Terrace paralleled New Dorp Lane); Poultney Street/Laconia Avenue is to the northwest; the Lower New York Bay is to the southeast, and Seaview Avenue is to the northeast. Father Capodanno Boulevard and Midland Avenue are Midland Beach's two main arteries.

Midland Beach is part of Staten Island Community District 2 and its ZIP Codes are 10305 and 10306. Midland Beach is patrolled by the 122nd Precinct of the New York City Police Department.

== History ==
=== Resort years ===
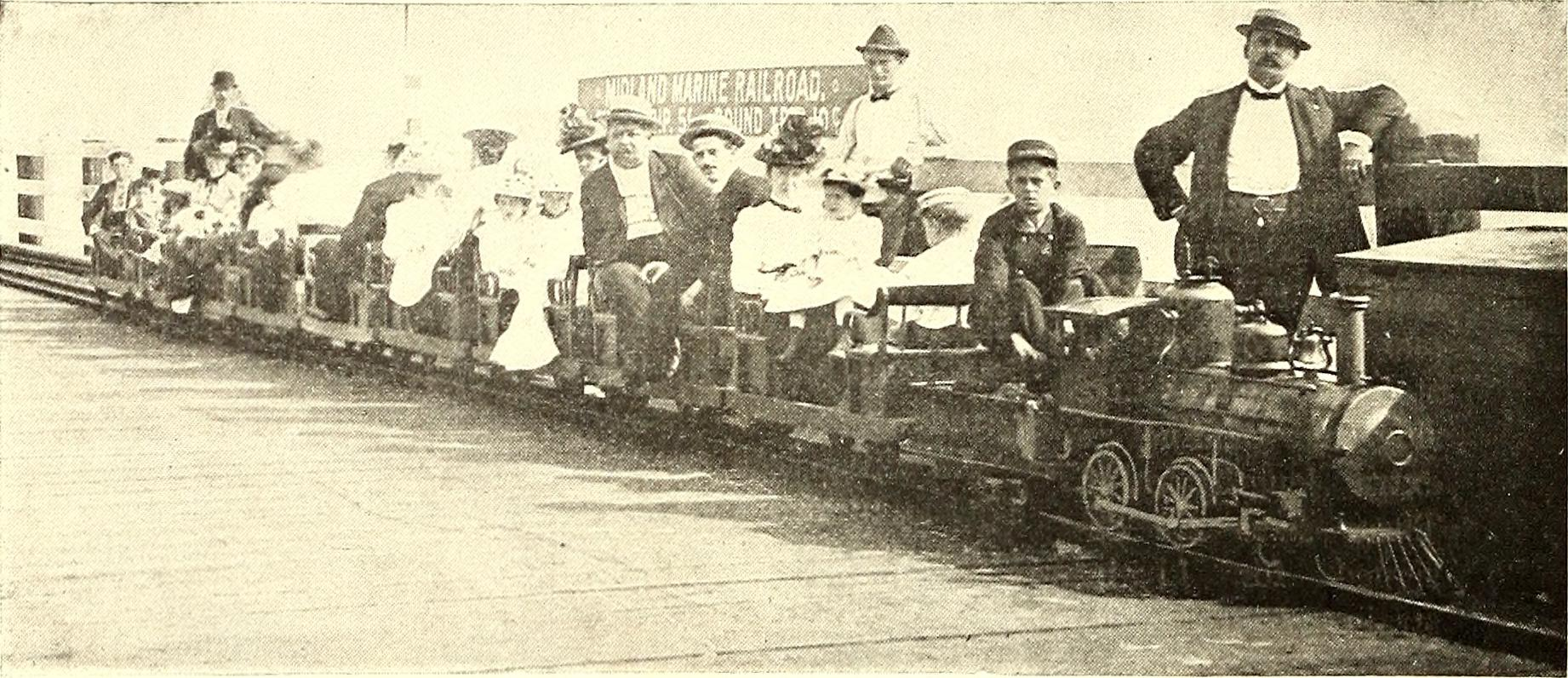
Miniature train for the Midland Beach Pier

Midland Beach became a resort by the 1890s when the Staten Island Railway's South Beach Branch came to nearby Wentworth Avenue, where there were transfers to trolleys serving the area. It contained a 1,700-foot (520 m) pier jutting into the Atlantic Ocean, where visitors could catch the steamboat William Story to the Battery at the tip of Lower Manhattan. The pier was so long that the Midland Beach Railway Company operated a miniature railroad to take fishermen and other visitors to the end of the pier. Around 1900, there was a disagreement between operators of Midland Beach and the town to the south, Woodland Beach, due to the pier's location close to the border between the towns. A fence along the beach was repeatedly erected and torn down, and the dispute was only resolved several years later.

Nevertheless, Midland Beach became a popular destination, easily visible from Coney Island across the Lower New York Bay, and fireworks from Coney Island could be seen from Midland Beach at night. Like South Beach, it offered theater performances, a beach, picnicking areas, snack kiosks, an "Aquarama" panorama, and numerous hotels and bungalows. The attractions were also similar: they included Japanese bowling, a Thompson scenic railway, a dance pavilion, a carousel, a circle swing, and a theater. The beach also contained a boardwalk. Three separate wooden coasters were constructed along Midland Beach. Normally, no admission was charged, but the first admission fee was instituted at a carnival in June 1918, whereupon revenue from the 10-cent charge was donated to the American Red Cross. A saltwater swimming pool was added in 1924.

Midland Beach, like its northern neighbor South Beach, also saw several large fires and other severe incidents. For instance, a conflagration in 1916 damaged large portions of the resort. Rider incidents included a 1917 accident where a patron was left dangling from a roller coaster by his leg, and a miniature train derailment in 1918 that injured 12 people. An extreme thunderstorm in 1923 resulted in several buildings being set on fire by lightning, as well as trolley tracks being washed away by storm surges.

Midland Beach's downfall was caused by two clusters of fires in 1924, though it continued to operate for five more years. In August 1924, two fires occurred on the pier: a small fire at its west end, followed by a much larger fire that nearly destroyed the pier. The fire severely reduced the ability of boats to travel to Midland Beach. In late September, a few weeks after the end of the season, a large fire burned or damaged 15 of the 5,000 summer bungalows at Midland Beach, as well as destroyed four hotels and most of the rides in the Midland Beach Resort. Many of the structures could not be rebuilt because the owners lacked insurance. The year after, James S. Graham purchased much of the remaining resort and rebuilt many of the attractions, including a scenic railroad, Barrel of Fun, Old Mill, skee-ball, and other smaller amusements. However, a fire in 1929 destroyed one-fourth of the rebuilt park, and Midland Beach was subsequently used primarily for swimming, with the beach being restricted and visitors charged a 25-cent fee. The fee was repealed by order of the city in 1930.

=== Residential neighborhood ===
Rainstorms on the island caused wind or water damage (such as flooded bungalows) in Midland Beach in the 1970s, due to its proximity to the coast and lack of storm sewers. The City of New York installed a large new storm sewer system down Greeley Avenue in 1979, which resolved the flooding issues for most of the newer housing stock in the neighborhood. Today, the bungalows built as summer homes are owned or rented by locals for permanent residence. According to data compiled by the Roman Catholic Archdiocese of New York, the parish of St. Margaret Mary, which serves Midland Beach, is a middle-class parish on Staten Island based on per-capita income.

The neighborhood once had its own post office branch, bearing the postal code "Staten Island 11, New York." The building that housed the post office, located at 553 Lincoln Avenue, was one of the smallest. The post office closed in 1949.

The Ocean Breeze Fishing Pier, a steel and concrete recreational pier, opened in September 2003. At 835 feet (255 m), it is the largest oceanfront recreational pier built in the New York metropolitan area in over a century.

Midland Beach was devastated by the storm surge caused by Hurricane Sandy on October 29, 2012.

== Demographics ==
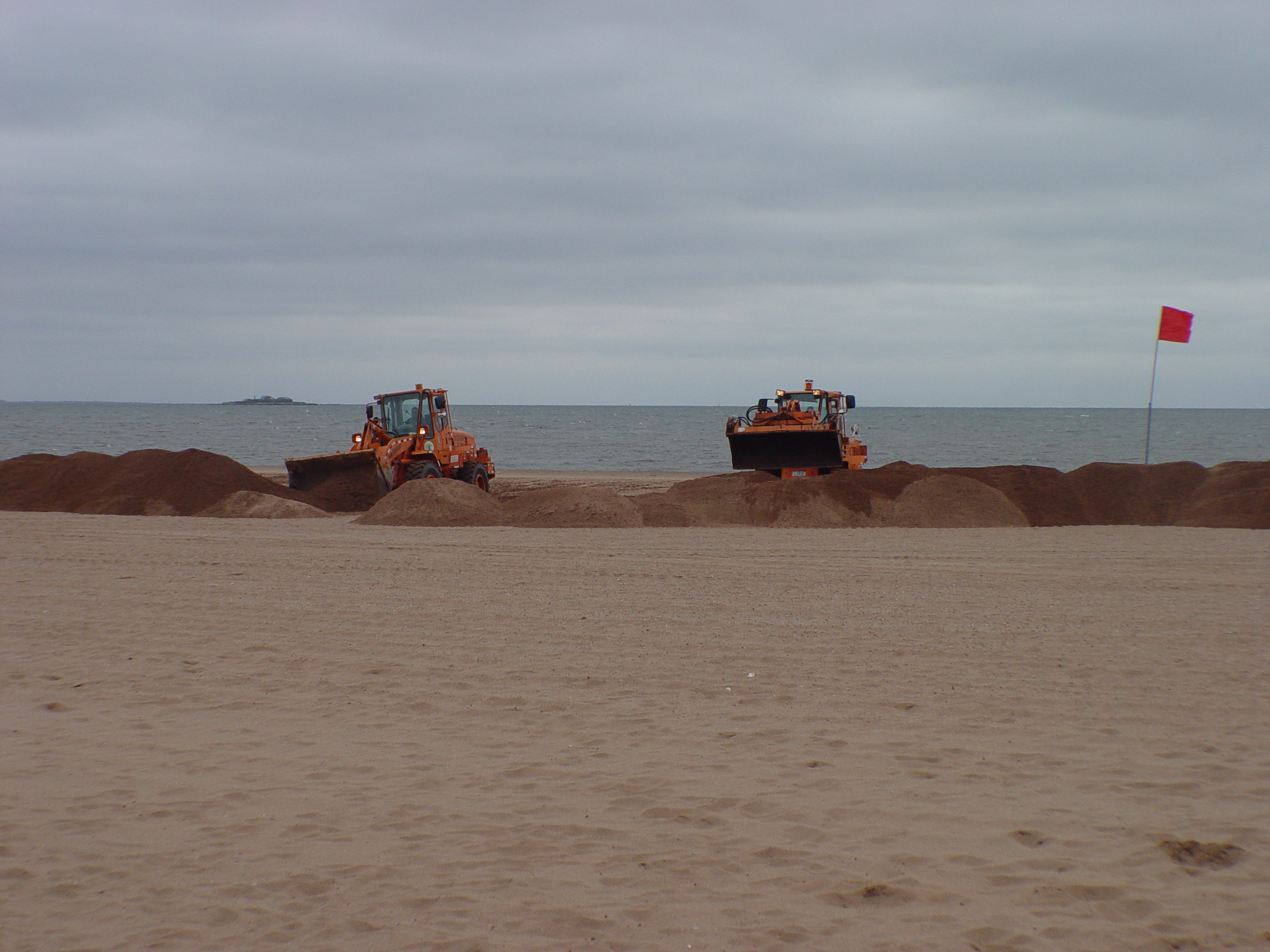
Beachfront at the South Beach–Franklin Delano Roosevelt Boardwalk

For census purposes, the New York City Department of City Planning classifies Midland Beach as part of a larger Neighborhood Tabulation Area called New Dorp-Midland Beach SI0202. This designated neighborhood had 29,083 inhabitants based on data from the 2020 United States Census. This was an increase of 1,460 persons (5.3%) from the 27,623 counted in 2010. The neighborhood had a population density of 20.4 inhabitants per acre (14,500/sq mi; 5,600/km^{2}).

The racial makeup of the neighborhood was 65.8% (19,149) White (Non-Hispanic), 1.5% (432) Black (Non-Hispanic), 15.5% (4,507) Asian, and 2.7% (774) from two or more races. Hispanic or Latino of any race were 14.5% (4,221) of the population.

According to the 2020 United States Census, this area has many cultural communities of over 1,000 inhabitants. This include residents who identify as Mexican, Puerto Rican, Albanian, German, Irish, Italian, Polish, Russian, and Chinese.

The largest age group was people 50-64 years old, which made up 22.6% of the residents. 72.6% of the households had at least one family present. Out of the 10,148 households, 51.6% had a married couple (20.6% with a child under 18), 5.2% had a cohabiting couple (1.9% with a child under 18), 17.1% had a single male (1.2% with a child under 18), and 26.1% had a single female (3.9% with a child under 18). 31.8% of households had children under 18. In this neighborhood, 70.2% of non-vacant housing units are renter-occupied.

The entirety of Community District 2, which comprises Midland Beach and other Mid-Island neighborhoods, had 134,657 inhabitants as of NYC Health's 2018 Community Health Profile, with an average life expectancy of 81.2 years. This is the same as the median life expectancy of 81.2 for all New York City neighborhoods. Most inhabitants are youth and middle-aged adults: 20% are between the ages of between 0–17, 25% between 25 and 44, and 29% between 45 and 64. The ratio of college-aged and elderly residents was lower, at 8% and 18% respectively.

As of 2017, the median household income in Community District 2 was $81,487, though the median income in Midland Beach individually was $80,412. In 2018, an estimated 14% of Midland Beach and Mid-Island residents lived in poverty, compared to 17% in all of Staten Island and 20% in all of New York City. One in sixteen residents (6%) were unemployed, compared to 6% in Staten Island and 9% in New York City. Rent burden, or the percentage of residents who have difficulty paying their rent, is 52% in Midland Beach and Mid-Island, compared to the boroughwide and citywide rates of 49% and 51% respectively. Based on this calculation, as of 2018, Midland Beach and Mid-Island are considered high-income relative to the rest of the city and not gentrifying.

== Bluebelt ==
The Midland Beach (New Creek) Bluebelt, part of the larger Staten Island Bluebelt, is now being constructed by the New York City Department of Environmental Protection throughout the northern edge of the neighborhood, where most of the bungalows stand. This comprehensive watershed wetlands will alleviate much of the flooding that occurs in this low-lying area. The land will be protected for passive residential use and absorb storm water runoff. Stone bridges, culverts, viaducts, walls and tree plantings will beautify the neighborhood and eventually eliminate the blight that has plagued the northern edge of Midland Beach since the 1960s.

== Police and crime ==
Midland Beach and Mid-Island are patrolled by the 122nd Precinct of the NYPD, located at 2320 Hylan Boulevard. The 122nd Precinct ranked 2nd safest out of 69 patrol areas for per-capita crime in 2010, behind only the 123rd Precinct on Staten Island's South Shore. As of 2018, with a non-fatal assault rate of 40 per 100,000 people, Midland Beach and Mid-Island's rate of violent crimes per capita is less than that of the city as a whole. The incarceration rate of 253 per 100,000 people is lower than that of the city as a whole.

The 122nd Precinct has a substantially lower crime rate than in the 1990s, with crimes across all categories having decreased by 88.3% between 1990 and 2022. The precinct reported one murder, eight rapes, 63 robberies, 128 felony assaults, 91 burglaries, 373 grand larcenies, and 136 grand larcenies auto in 2022.

== Fire safety ==
Midland Beach is served by the New York City Fire Department (FDNY)'s Engine Co. 165/Ladder Co. 85, located at 3067 Richmond Road. Engine Co. 165 is the only Engine Company in Staten Island that has clothing to deal with hazardous materials, and it also has extra hazmat training.

== Health ==
As of 2018, preterm births and births to teenage mothers are less common in Midland Beach and Mid-Island than in other places citywide. In Midland Beach and Mid-Island, there were 80 preterm births per 1,000 live births (compared to 87 per 1,000 citywide), and 6.8 births to teenage mothers per 1,000 live births (compared to 19.3 per 1,000 citywide). Midland Beach and Mid-Island have a low population of residents who are uninsured. In 2018, this population of uninsured residents was estimated to be 4%, less than the citywide rate of 12%, though this was based on a small sample size.

The concentration of fine particulate matter, the deadliest type of air pollutant, in Midland Beach and Mid-Island is 0.0069 milligrams per cubic metre (6.9×10^{−9} oz/ft^{3}), less than the city average. Fourteen percent of Midland Beach and Mid-Island residents are smokers, which is the same as the city average of 14% of residents being smokers. In Midland Beach and Mid-Island, 24% of residents are obese, 9% are diabetic, and 26% have high blood pressure—compared to the citywide averages of 24%, 11%, and 28% respectively. In addition, 19% of children are obese, compared to the citywide average of 20%.

Eighty-eight percent of residents eat some fruits and vegetables every day, which is about the same as the city's average of 87%. In 2018, 76% of residents described their health as "good", "very good", or "excellent", slightly less than the city's average of 78%. For every supermarket in Midland Beach and Mid-Island, there are 7 bodegas.

The nearest major hospital is Staten Island University Hospital in South Beach.

== Post office and ZIP Code ==
Midland Beach is located within the ZIP Codes 10305 and 10306. The nearest post office operated by the United States Postal Service is the New Dorp Station post office at 2562 Hylan Boulevard.

== Education ==
Midland Beach and Mid-Island generally have a similar rate of college-educated residents to the rest of the city as of 2018. While 40% of residents age 25 and older have a college education or higher, 11% have less than a high school education and 49% are high school graduates or have some college education. By contrast, 39% of Staten Island residents and 43% of city residents have a college education or higher. The percentage of Midland Beach and Mid-Island students excelling in math rose from 49% in 2000 to 65% in 2011, though reading achievement declined from 55% to 52% during the same time period.

Midland Beach and Mid-Island's rate of elementary school student absenteeism is lower than the rest of New York City. In Midland Beach and Mid-Island, 15% of elementary school students missed twenty or more days per school year, less than the citywide average of 20%. Additionally, 87% of high school students in Midland Beach and Mid-Island graduate on time, more than the citywide average of 75%.

=== Schools ===
The New York City Department of Education operates the following public schools in Midland Beach:

- PS 38 George Cromwell (grades PK-5)
- PS 52 John C Thompson (grades PK-5)

The Roman Catholic Archdiocese of New York operates Staten Island Catholic schools. St. Margaret Mary Parish School in Midland Beach closed in 2011. In its final year it had 74 students, giving it a 30% utilization rate.

== Transportation ==
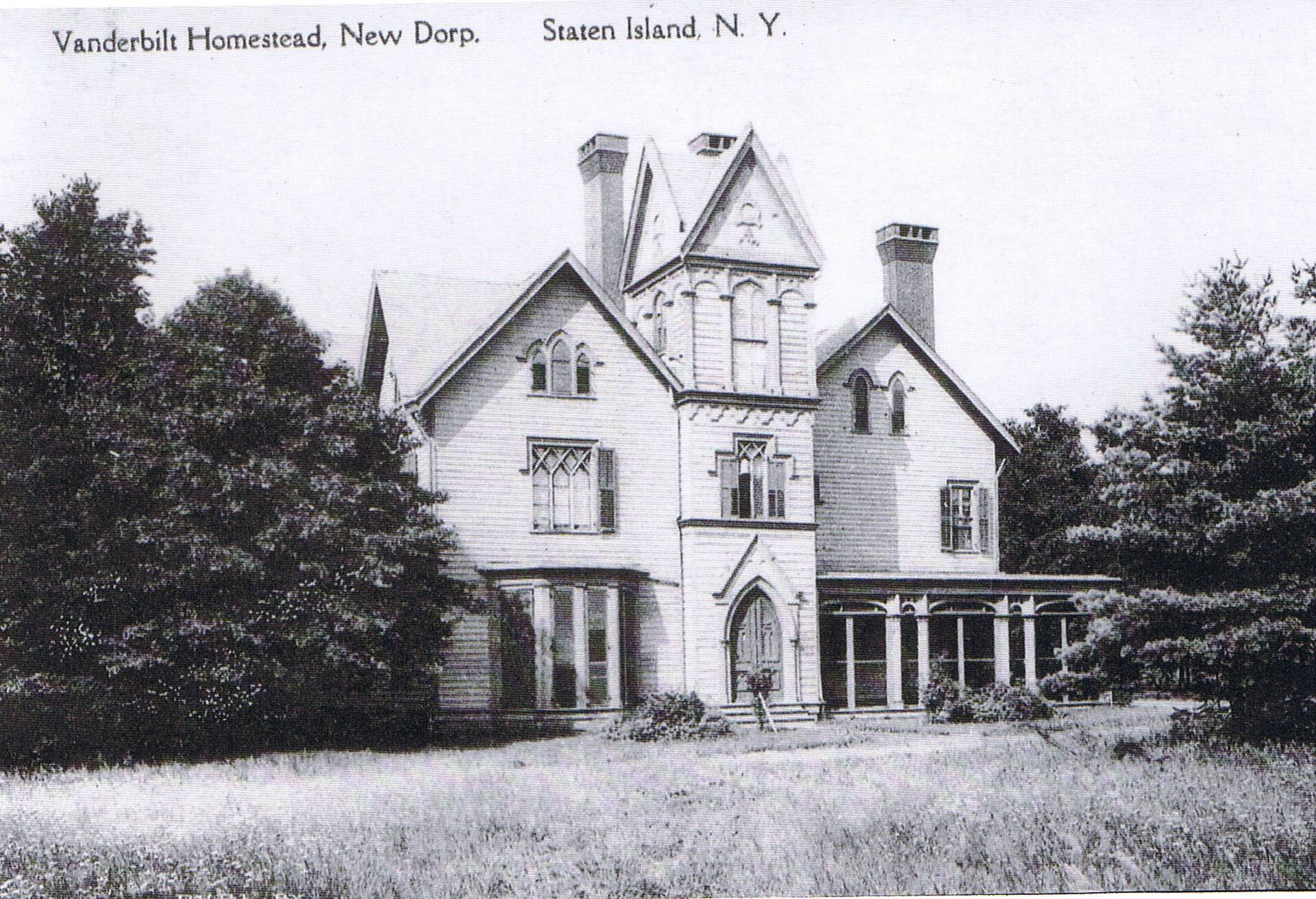
William H. Vanderbilt's mansion in Woodland Beach, 1915

Midland Beach is served by a number of local and express buses. The S78 and S79 SBS local buses and SIM1, SIM7 and SIM10 express buses stop along Hylan Boulevard. The S51, S52 and S81 local and limited buses and SIM5, SIM6 and SIM9 express buses travel along Father Capodanno Boulevard.

== Notable people ==
One of Woodland Beach's most famous residents was William Henry Vanderbilt, Cornelius Vanderbilt's oldest son. He maintained a profitable 186.7-acre (0.756 km^{2}) farm in 1855 and built an Italianate style 24-room mansion on the property, complete with horse stables, trotting field and judges' stands, which was overseen by his son George Washington Vanderbilt II. It is now Miller Field, part of the Gateway National Recreation Area.
