= Rose and Crown Tavern =

Farmhouse and tavern in Staten Island, New York

Coordinates: 40°34.54′N 74°7.2′W

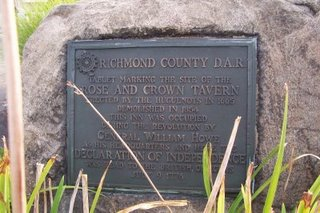
The Rose and Crown Tavern stone marker

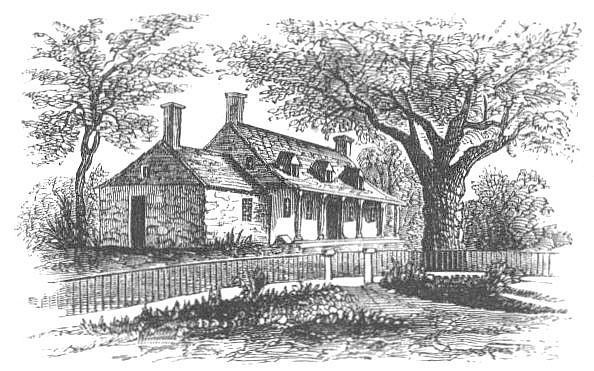
Rose & Crown Tavern

The Rose and Crown Tavern was a farmhouse and tavern located in New Dorp, Staten Island, New York.

== History ==
The tavern was built by Huguenot immigrants in 1665.

During the American Revolution the tavern was owned by Cornelius Vanderbilt, the uncle of Commodore Cornelius Vanderbilt. An historian described the tavern as a "one-story building of stone, with a hall through the middle, and rooms on either side; in front was a large elm tree." The future King William stayed at the tavern as a young adult for an extended period in 1781 during the British occupation.

In 1776, General William Howe, with his aides-de-camp and 30,000 British and Hessian soldiers, was encamped on Staten Island awaiting orders to invade New York City. During that time, the tavern became the local British headquarters. On July 9, 1776, General Howe read the United States Declaration of Independence to his troops at this tavern. Other military occupants of the tavern representing the British included General Wilhelm von Knyphausen and Sir Guy Carleton. It was here at the tavern that the Battle of Brooklyn was planned.

The building itself was demolished in 1854. In 1855 an Italianate mansion was built on the site by David R. Ryers, who sold it in the 1890s to German confectioner Gustave Mayer, who invented Nilla wafers at that location. the formula of which was sold to Nabisco. The house, considered haunted, was listed for sale in 2015 for US$2.3 million.

In 1921, the Richmond County Chapter of the Daughters of the American Revolution erected a stone marker at the approximate location of the tavern to signify that the tavern once stood there. The marker is located at the corner of New Dorp Lane and Richmond Road.
