= New Creek (Staten Island) =

Urban stream in Staten Island, New York

Coordinates: 40°34′38.02″N 74°5′5.13″W

The New Creek is an urban stream on the East Shore of Staten Island, New York City. The creek is fed by many natural springs in the area, which were used by the Lenape Indians before the arrival of European colonists in the 17th century. Many of the springs have been channeled underground by urban development as the population expanded throughout New York City and Staten Island.

The New Creek watershed encompasses 2,249 acres (9.10 km^{2}) and consists of marshland which supports a variety of flora and fauna. Spartina grass flourished in a tidal wetland before the restoration of the shore and beach area and the development of a shoreline urban park by the New York City Department of Parks and Recreation in the 1960s, blocking tidal flow to the area. Some of the indigenous flora include Rose Mallow, Soft Rush, and Bladder Sedge.

The main channel originates at the Last Chance Pond Park and dominates the neighborhood of Midland Beach, with the surrounding watershed covering the neighborhoods of Dongan Hills, Grant City and Todt Hill. The west branch originates at the Boundary Avenue wetlands (Midland Field), and the east branch originates from southern end of Dongan Hills Avenue (and Patterson Avenue). The upper parts of the watershed are fed by Moravian Brook and Mersereau Valley, which feed the West and Main channels.

Previous to the name New Creek, the branches had their own titles "including Perine’s Creek, Old Town Creek (aka Pole Creek), Barton’s Creek (aka Seaver’s Creek), and Barne’s Creek, which flowed out past Poppy Joe’s Island."

The New York City Department of Environmental Protection (NYCDEP) has embarked on a vast Bluebelt project, which began in the 1990s and incorporates most of the east and south shores of Staten Island. In 2019 the New York City Department of Transportation and DEP began constriction on a $121 million enhancement. The project would award $33 million to put towards the "Gateway to the Bluebelt," creating a public viewing area and rehabilitate wetlands; $42 million towards expansion of the New Creek Bluebelt and would "create the largest wetland area in the entire Bluebelt system," and incorporates an upgraded storm sewer system, outfalls, stilling basins, micro pools, and weirs on and along the creek.
