= New Dorp Beach =

Public beach in Staten Island, New York

Coordinates: 40°33′51″N 74°06′16″W

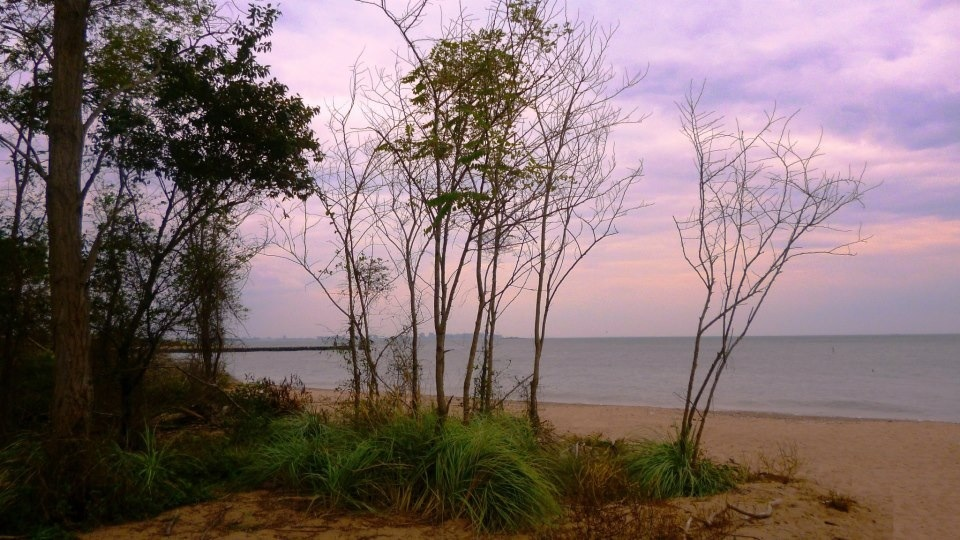
New Dorp Beach, October 2012, on the site of the old Clearwater Beach Colony that was torn down around 1965.

New Dorp Beach is along the shore of the neighborhood of New Dorp, on Staten Island, one of the five boroughs of New York City. It is between Midland Beach and Oakwood Beach.

== History ==
The first recorded European settlement in the town of New Dorp occurred by the beach, in 1671, when Governor Edmund Andros patented the land to Obediah Holmes, an 86-acre (35 ha) parcel of land from the Governor's Lot. A small two room cottage was built along near the shore. This small, colonial home would later be owned by Nathaniel Britton, and be known as the Britton Cottage. This cottage would sit for over 200 years, as the area of New Dorp Beach developed around it, eventually finding itself sitting at the corner of New Dorp Lane and Cedar Grove Avenue.

After the Civil War, the area began to prosper as a resort, as campgrounds and seasonal bungalows began to develop along the gridded side streets along Cedar Grove Avenue. Along the waterfront, wooden piers and hotels popped up. The New Dorp Beach Hotel, formerly located along the beach, sat on a large lot which fronted both Cedar Grove Avenue and Marine Way, which once extended down to the water. Along the southern end, the Cedar Grove Beach Club grew, with a line of summer bungalows.

In 1879, the St. John's Guild acquired 14 acres (5.7 ha) of land along the shore of New Dorp Beach, and built a hospital, known as Seaside Hospital. This, along with a dock for their boat, would be owned by the St. John's Guild till 1951, when the hospital went up for sale. The hospital and its surrounding buildings would later be demolished.

Britton Cottage was donated to the Staten Island Institute of Arts and Sciences by Nathaniel Britton, for the sake of preservation of colonial architecture. The house was razed and rebuilt at the foot of Richmond Road, in Historic Richmondtown, in 1967. At that point, much of the old resort community and waterfront property on the beach side of Cedar Grove Avenue had been acquired by the city via eminent domain. The property was demolished to prepare for the Shore Front Drive, part of the master plan of Robert Moses. But by the 1960s, opposition to Moses' projects had forced the mayor to relieve Moses of his positions, and the city's fiscal crises helped to put a halt to the oncoming new highway, which was never built. Cedar Grove Beach opened to the public in 2026.

== Present day ==
The land sits now as parkland of the Parks Department, with many of its old streets now turned into walking paths, and many of the old trees grown over. The remains of any of the hotels or beachfront communities is buried underneath the 10-foot (3.0 m) tall sand dunes which appeared in the mid-1980s, while the foundations of the old hospital have since been unearthed by the eroding sand.

Residents of New Dorp Beach are a more mixed crowd than the homogeneous blocks above Hylan Blvd. Most houses are converted beach houses with many attached homes mixed in. Many residents are of Italian or Irish descent.

New Dorp Beach is home to Miller Field, Dugan Park, and the namesake of the neighborhood, New Dorp Beach. Flooding occurs regularly between Marine Way and Tysen's Lane, where the elevation of the land goes to sea level and below to meet the tidal wetlands within Cedar Grove Beach. A small saltwater pond at the foot of Marine Way appears in the 1874 Beers map of Richmond. Alois Peteler built the pond for his hotel, South Beach Pavilion.
