= Britton Cottage =

House in Staten Island, New York

Coordinates: 40°34′19.2″N 74°08′45.1″W

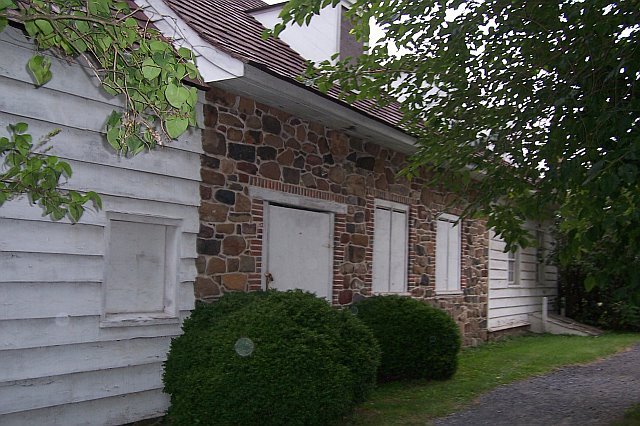
Britton Cottage

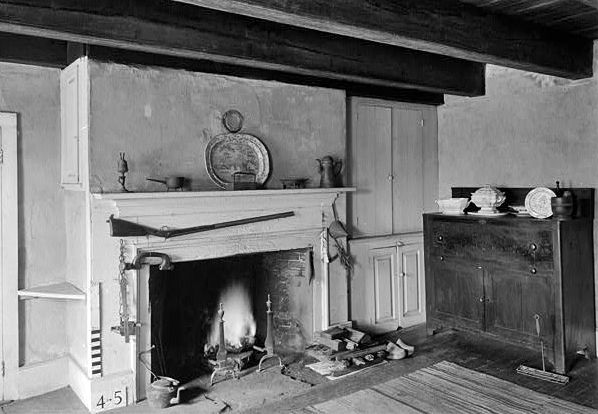
Britton Cottage

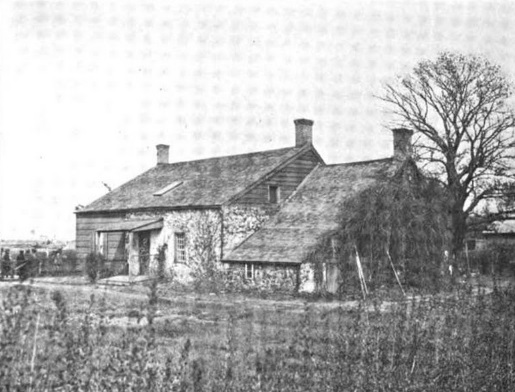
The Britton Cottage in 1920

The Britton Cottage, formerly known as the Cubberly House, is a house in the Historic Richmond Town museum complex in the neighborhood of Richmondtown, Staten Island, in New York City. The oldest section of the cottage dates to 1671, with additions in the mid-18th century. It is constructed of stone and timberframe components. The house was originally located at the intersection of New Dorp Lane and Cedar Grove Avenue in the New Dorp Beach section of Staten Island, but was moved to its current location in 1967 when it was threatened with demolition.

== History of ownership ==
The earliest section of the house was built to serve court and government functions. One of its earliest known inhabitants was town clerk and justice of the peace Obadiah Holmes, the son of early Rhode Island settler Obadiah Holmes, who came from Long Island. In 1679, he transferred ownership of the property to his son Obadiah. Nathaniel Britton, an ancestor of the man for whom the cottage is named, acquired the house in 1695. Isaac Cubberly bought the house in 1761 and the house remained in his family for eighty-six years. Dr. Nathaniel Lord Britton, a botanist and the creator of the New York Botanical Garden, became the owner of the house in the 19th century and deeded the house to the Staten Island Institute of Arts and Sciences in 1915.

== See also ==
- List of the oldest buildings in New York
- List of New York City Designated Landmarks in Staten Island
- National Register of Historic Places listings in Richmond County, New York

== Other sources ==
- Sterling, Keir B. 1997. Biographical Dictionary of American and Canadian Naturalists and Environmentalists, Westport, Conn: Greenwood Press.
- Neighborhood Preservation center, New York, NY
