= Bluebelt =

New York City storm water management system

Coordinates: 40.758°N 73.984°W

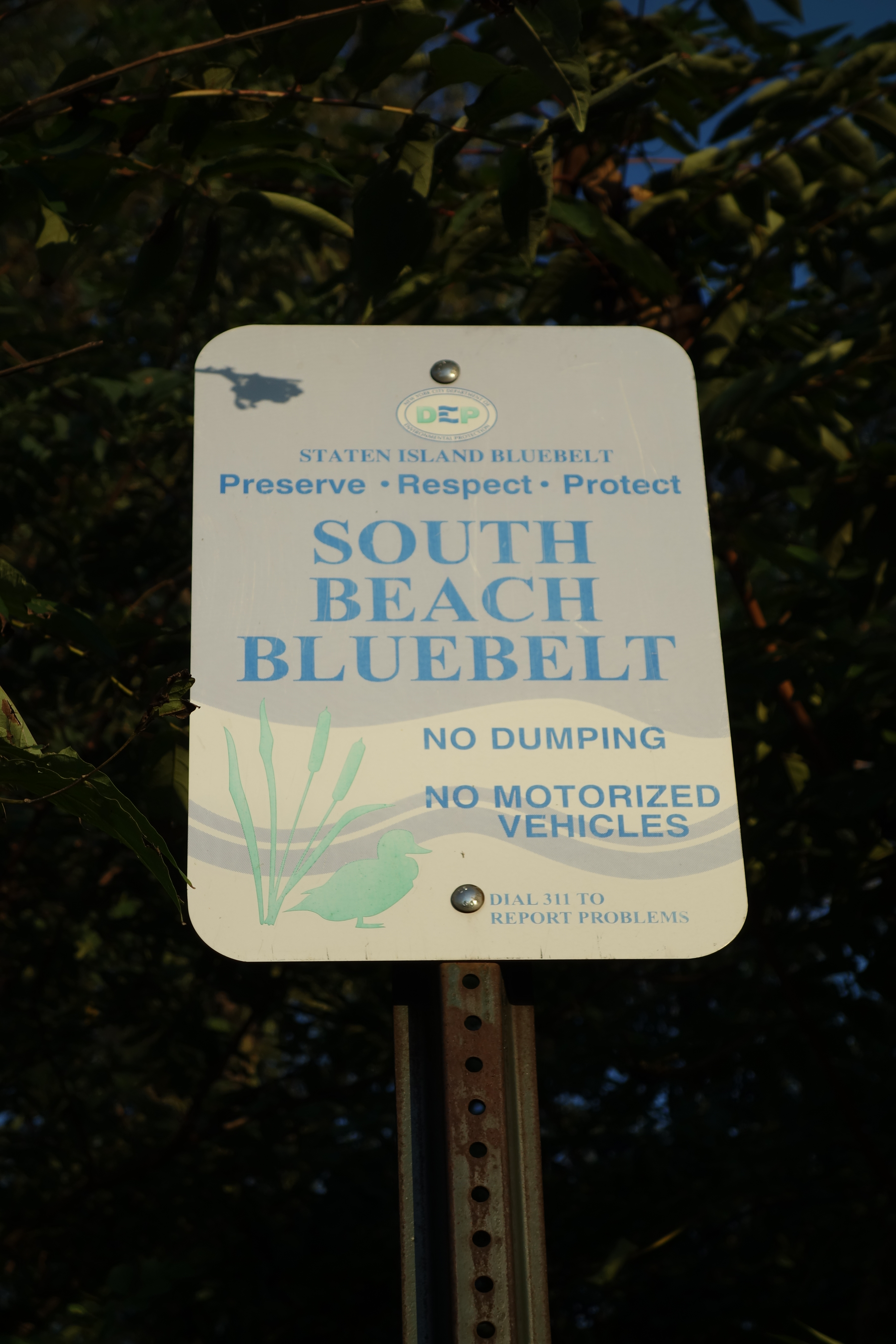
A sign for the Staten Island Bluebelt in South Beach, Staten Island

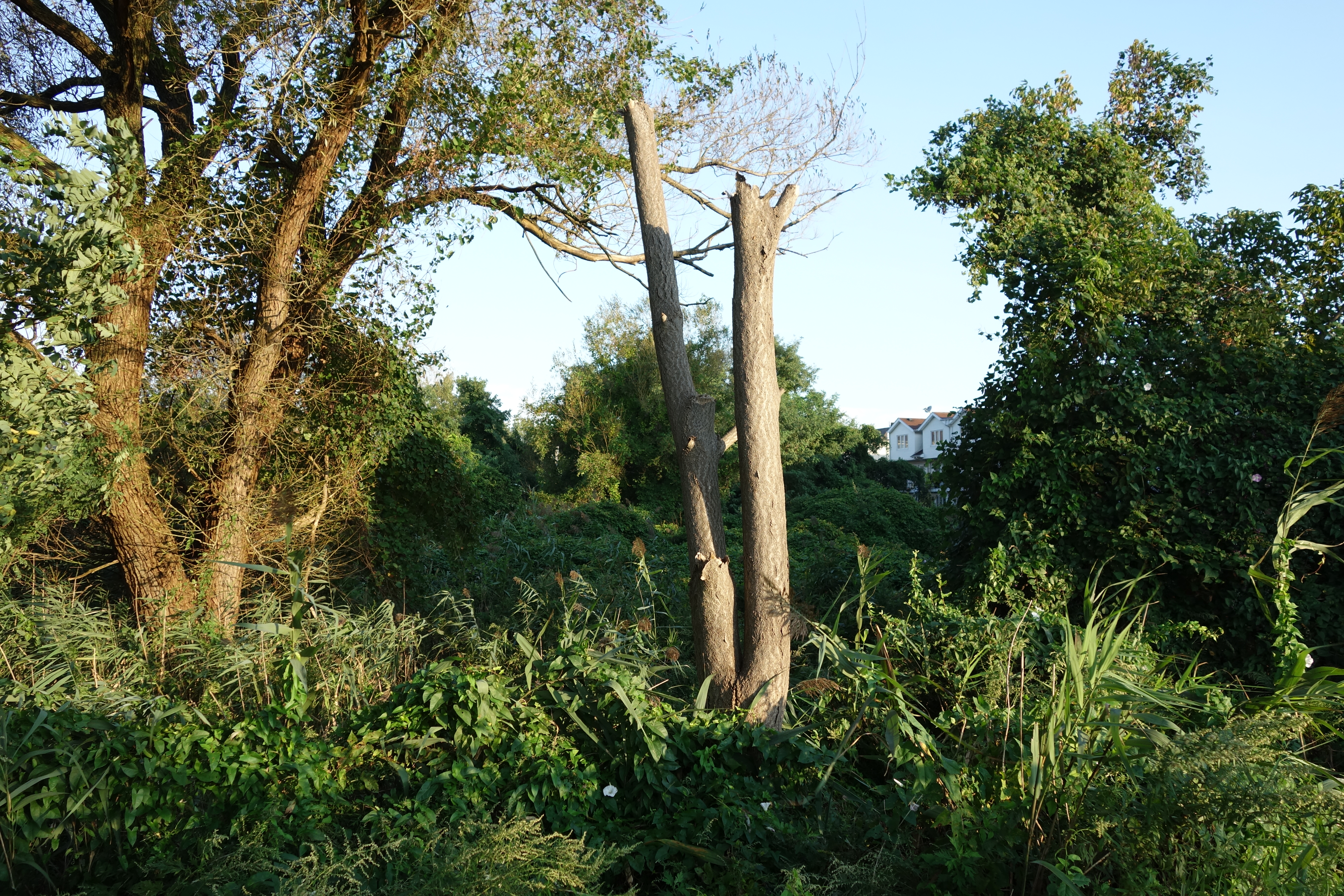
South Beach Wetlands, part of the Bluebelt

The Bluebelt is a large scale system of stormwater best management practices (BMPs) in New York City. The program originated on Staten Island in the early 1990s, but has also been implemented in Queens and the Bronx. The Bluebelt includes structural and nonstructural stormwater management control measures taken to mitigate changes to both quantity and quality of runoff caused through changes to land use.

== History ==
The Bluebelt program was initiated in the late 1980s by New York City’s Departments of Environmental Protection and City Planning, based on a suggestion made several decades earlier by Ian McHarg, a landscape architect. Acquisition of land began in 1991 for the project, one of the Northeast United States’ most ambitious stormwater management efforts. The overall goal is to provide the necessary stormwater drainage infrastructure for a 12,000-acre (49 km^{2}) region on the southern end of the island while at the same time preserving the last freshwater wetlands in New York City. The bluebelt uses a series of carefully placed BMPs at the storm sewer/wetland interface to reduce flooding and improve water quality. Creation of a self-regulating ecosystem that is native to the region is of primary importance to the program.

BMPs used in the bluebelt include stormwater wetlands, stream restoration, outlet stilling basins, and sand filters. Ninety-two stormwater wetlands were included as part of the Staten Island project. In order to integrate the wetlands into the natural ecology, the construction process is advised by restoration specialists since general contractors are typically not trained in proper plant selection and installation. The planting design focuses on quick establishment of the preferred successional communities that will complement the surrounding landscape, before invasive species take over the site.

The performance of the Bluebelt during the storms that battered the city in the early 21st century – including Hurricane Sandy – has been described as "brilliant".

== See also ==
- Low-impact development (U.S. and Canada)
