= Australians in the United Kingdom =

Ethnic group in the United Kingdom

Total population
- Australia-born residents in the United Kingdom: 124,813 – 0.2% (2021/22 Census) (Note: Does not include Australians born in the United Kingdom or those with ancestry rooted in Australia); England: 109,963 – 0.2% (2021); Scotland: 9,575 – 0.2% (2022); Wales: 3,008 – 0.1% (2021); Northern Ireland: 2,267 – 0.1% (2021); 126,316 (2011 Census); Australian citizens/passports held: 51,168 (England and Wales only, 2021); Other estimates: 166,000 (2020 ONS estimate)

Regions with significant populations
- Regions: London, South East England; Cities: London (Earl's Court, Kensington, Hammersmith, Fulham, Shepherd's Bush, Putney and Clapham)

Languages
- Australian English, British English, Australian Aboriginal languages

Related ethnic groups
- Australian diaspora and Anglo-Celtic Australians

Australians in the United Kingdom, or Australian Britons, include Australians who have become residents or citizens of the United Kingdom. The largest segment of Australia's diaspora of 1 million resides in the United Kingdom.

The 2001 UK Census recorded 107,871 Australian-born people. In that census, the highest concentration of Australians in the UK was recorded in south-west London, with sizeable communities in Earl's Court, Kensington, Hammersmith, Fulham, Shepherd's Bush and Putney. In 2007, Bloomberg reported that there were approximately 200,000 Australians in London. In 2008, The Times reported that there were 400,000 Australians in the United Kingdom. The 2011 UK Census recorded 113,592 residents born in Australia in England, 2,695 in Wales, 8,279 in Scotland, and 1,750 in Northern Ireland. Within England, the majority were resident in London (53,959) and the South East (20,242). The Office for National Statistics estimates that 138,000 people born in Australia were resident in the UK in 2017. The equivalent estimate in 2020 was 166,000.

The late-2000s recession was reported to have resulted in an increased number of Australians moving from the UK. 2,700 Australians left each month in late 2008, compared to 1,750 a month in 2005.

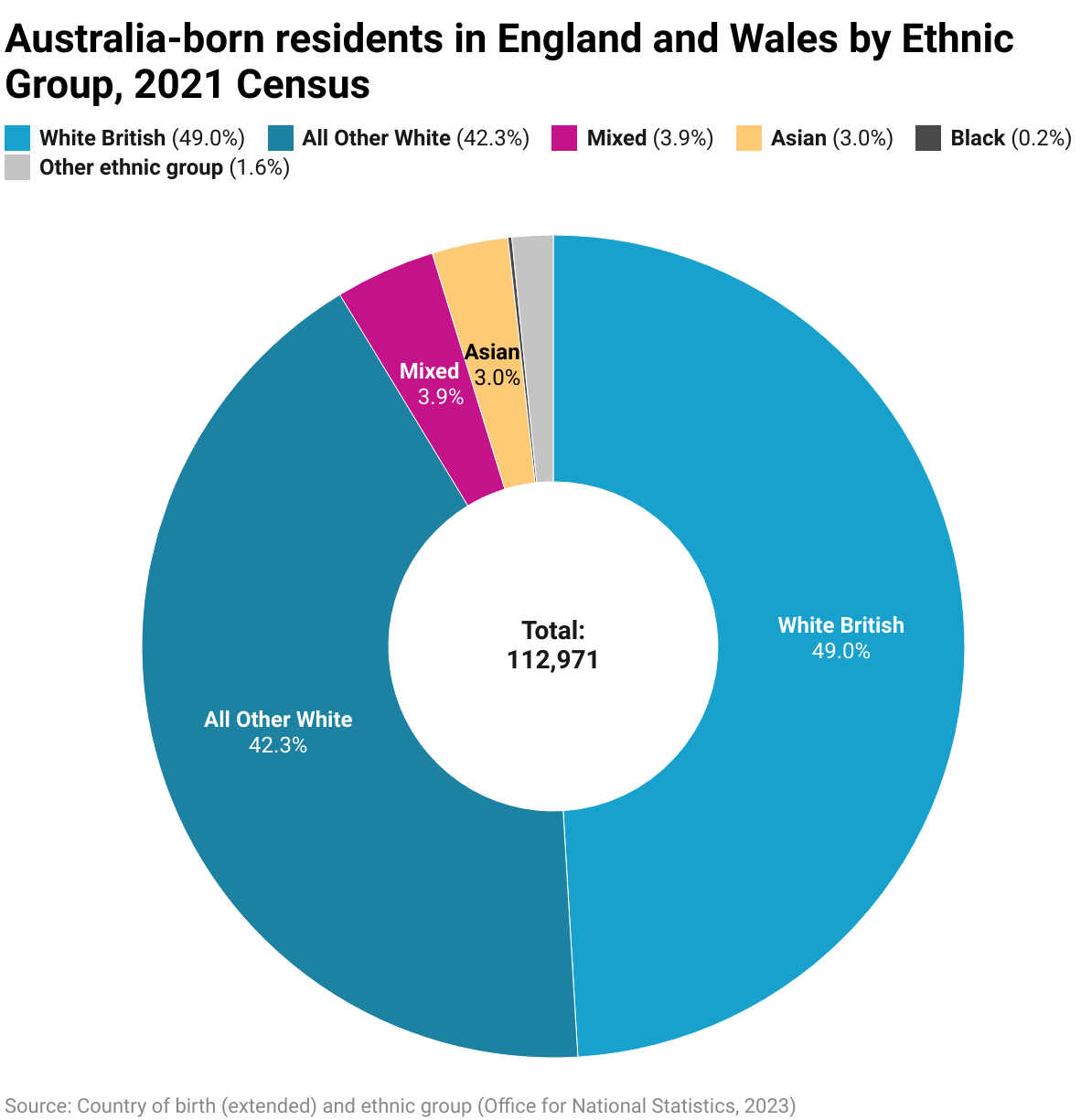
Australia-born residents by ethnic group (2021 census, England and Wales)

== Notable individuals ==
| Name | Occupation |
|---|---|
| Milly Alcock | Actress |
| Vanessa Amorosi | Entertainer |
| Peter Andre | Entertainer (Born in London and raised in Australia) |
| Tina Arena | Entertainer |
| Francis Bacon | Artist (Father born in Australia) |
| Natalie Bennett | Former leader of the Green Party |
| Phil Black | Journalist |
| Deidre Brock | MP for Edinburgh North and Leith (2015–present), Scottish National Party politician |
| Hedley Bull | International relations scholar |
| Nick Cave | Singer, songwriter and screenwriter |
| Hubert Clifford | Composer and conductor; born 1904 in Victoria |
| John Gregory Crace | Naval officer |
| Lynton Crosby | Political strategist |
| Georgia Davies | Musician |
| Jason Donovan | Singer and actor |
| Alexander Downer | High Commissioner |
| Courtney Eaton | Actress and model |
| Richard Farleigh | Investor |
| John Gough | Composer, radio producer and radio playwright; born 1903 in Tasmania |
| Germaine Greer | Feminist and writer |
| Charlotte Hatherley | Former guitarist and backing vocalist for band Ash; father is Australian. |
| Brady Haran | YouTuber, podcaster |
| Rolf Harris | Television presenter, artist, singer-songwriter, entertainer, composer, and convicted sex offender (born in Australia to Welsh parents but lived in the United Kingdom from 1952) |
| Darren Hayes | Singer (Savage Garden) |
| Patricia Hewitt | Former British Cabinet Minister and MP |
| David Higgins | Businessman |
| Adam Hills | Australian comedian and TV presenter, presents The Last Leg |
| Craig Revel Horwood | Choreographer |
| Barry Humphries | Comedian, actor and satirist |
| Toby Wallace | Actor |
| Natalie Imbruglia | Singer-songwriter, model, actress |
| Hugh Jackman | Actor |
| Clive James | Writer and broadcaster |
| Craig Johnston | Professional footballer |
| Harry Kewell | Football player |
| Nicole Kidman | Actress |
| Kathy Lette | Novelist and playwright |
| Abbey Lee | Model and actress |
| Elle Macpherson | Model, actress, and businesswoman |
| Tim Minchin | Comedian, actor and musician |
| Dannii Minogue | Entertainer |
| Kenneth Minogue | Political philosopher |
| Kylie Minogue | Entertainer |
| Elisabeth Murdoch | Founder of television production company Shine TV (UK) |
| John Pilger | Journalist and documentary film maker |
| Amanda Platell | Journalist and television presenter, best known as William Hague's press secretary in 1997–2001 |
| Peter Porter | Poet |
| Neil Robertson | Snooker player |
| Geoffrey Robertson | Human rights lawyer, author and broadcaster |
| Margot Robbie | Actress and film producer |
| Dan Schreiber | Radio and TV writer and producer (QI, The Museum of Curiosity) |
| Tony Smith | former professional rugby league footballer and head coach of the Warrington Wolves |
| Holly Valance | Actress and singer |
| Geraldine Viswanathan | Actress |
| Mark Webber | Racing driver |
| Catherine West | Member of Parliament for Hornsey and Wood Green since 2015 |
| Walter Worboys | Businessman |
| Cate Blanchett | Actress and film producer |

== See also ==
- Australia–United Kingdom relations
- Australian diaspora
- Ten Pound Poms
- Little Australia
- Australian rules football in the United Kingdom
