= New York City ethnic enclaves =

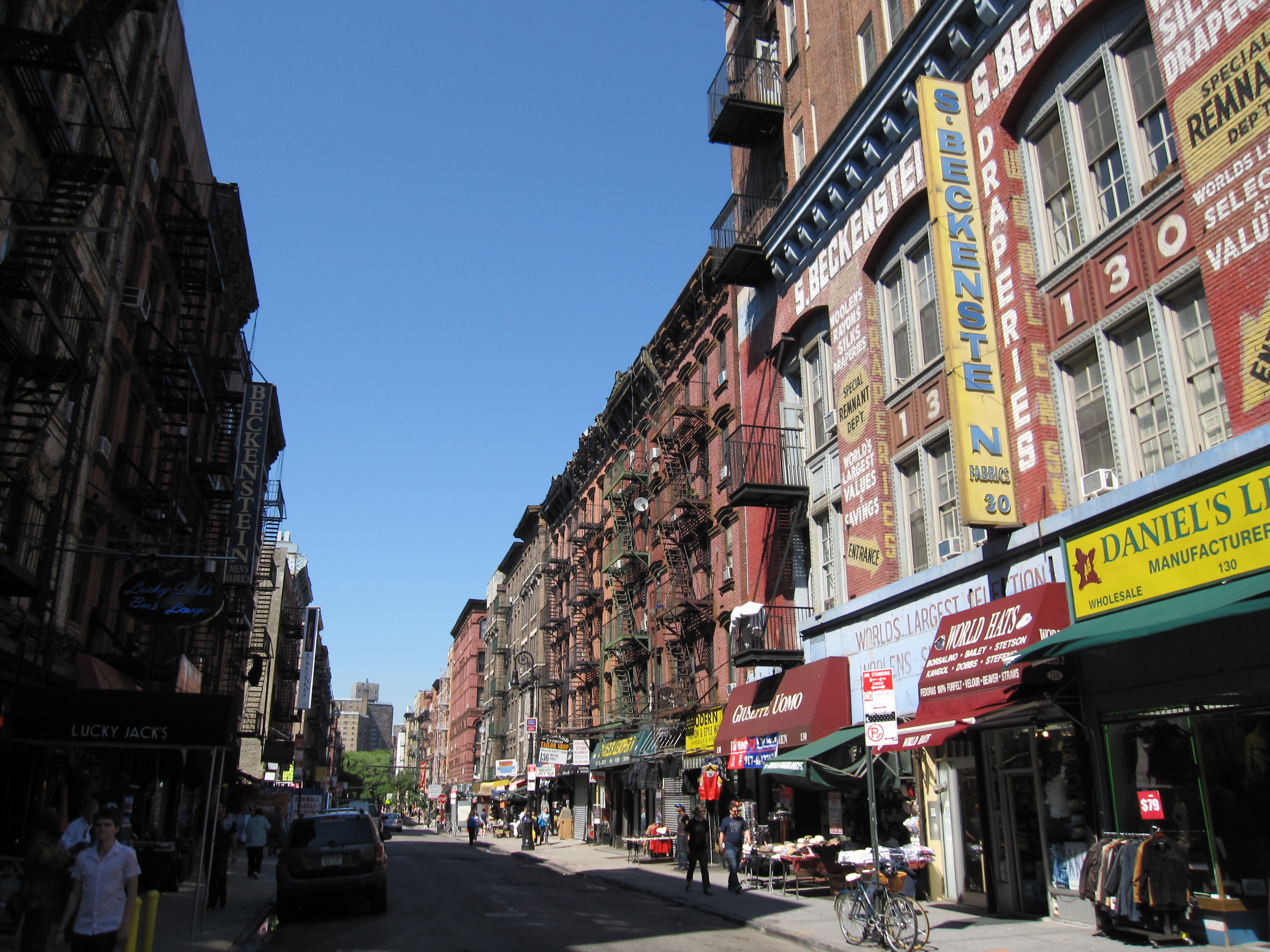
Orchard Street on the Lower East Side, once a bustling Jewish enclave

Since its founding in 1625 by Dutch traders as New Amsterdam, New York City has been a major destination for immigrants of many nationalities who have formed ethnic enclaves, neighborhoods dominated by one ethnicity. African-American freedmen also moved to New York City in the Great Migration and the later Second Great Migration and formed ethnic enclaves. These neighborhoods are set apart from the main city by differences such as food, goods for sale, or even language.

As of 2019, there are 3.1 million immigrants in New York City. This accounts for 37% of the city population and 45% of its workforce. Ethnic enclaves in New York include Caribbean, Asian, European, Latin American, Middle Eastern and Jewish groups, who immigrated from or whose ancestors immigrated from various countries. As many as 800 languages are spoken in New York.

== History of immigration to and ethnic enclaves in New York City ==
New York City was founded in 1625, by Dutch traders as New Amsterdam. The settlement was a slow growing village, but it was diverse. However, the Netherlands never had a large emigrant population, and the colony attracted few Dutch and more people from different ethnic groups. As early as 1646, 18 languages were spoken in New Amsterdam, and ethnic groups within New Amsterdam included Dutch, Danes, English, Flemish, French, Germans, Irish, Italians, Norwegians, Poles, Portuguese, Romanians Scots, Swedes, Walloons, and Bohemians. The young, diverse village also became a seafarer's town, with taverns and smugglers. After Peter Stuyvesant became Director, New Amsterdam began to grow more quickly, achieving a population of 1,500, and growing to 2,000 by 1655 and almost to 9,000 in 1664, when the British seized the colony, renaming it New York.

Colonial New York City was also a center of religious diversity, including one of the first Jewish congregations, along with Philadelphia, Savannah, and Newport, in what was to become the United States.

== African American ==
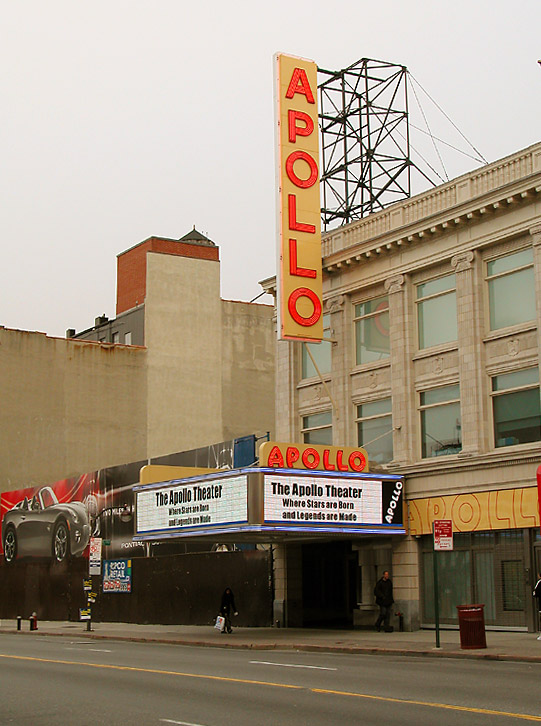
The Apollo Theater on 125th Street in Harlem.

The first recorded African Americans were brought to the present-day United States in 1619 as slaves. In 1780, under British occupation, New York City had approximately 10,000 freed people of African descent, the largest concentration of such people in North America. New York State began emancipating slaves in 1799, and in 1841, all slaves in New York State were freed, and many of New York's emancipated slaves lived in or moved to Fort Greene, Brooklyn. All slaves in the United States were later freed in 1865, with the end of the American Civil War and the ratification of the Thirteenth Amendment. After the Civil War, African Americans left the South, where slavery had been the strongest, in large numbers. These movements are now known as the Great Migration, during the 1910s and 1920s and the Second Great Migration, from the end of World War II until 1970.

After arriving in New York, the African Americans formed neighborhoods, partially due to racism of the landlords at the time. The socioeconomic center of these neighborhoods, and all of "Black America", was Harlem, in Northern Manhattan. Hamilton Heights, on Harlem's western side, was a nicer part of Harlem, and Sugar Hill, named because its inhabitants enjoyed the "sweet life", was the nicest part.

In the 1930s, after the Independent Subway System's Eighth Avenue and Fulton Street subways opened, Harlem residents began to leave crowded Harlem for Brooklyn. The first neighborhood African Americans moved to in large numbers was Bedford–Stuyvesant, composed of the neighborhoods Bedford, Stuyvesant Heights, Weeksville (which had an established African American community by the time of the New York Draft Riots), and Ocean Hill. From Bedford-Stuyvesant, African Americans moved into the surrounding neighborhoods, including Crown Heights, East New York and Brownsville. After World War II, "white flight" occurred, in which predominantly white residents moved to the suburbs and were replaced with minority residents. Neighborhoods that experienced this include Canarsie, Flatbush, and East Flatbush.

Queens also experienced "white flight". Jamaica and South Jamaica both underwent ethnic change. Some of Queens' African American neighborhoods are housing projects or housing cooperatives, such as Queensbridge and LeFrak City. Other African American neighborhoods include Laurelton, Cambria Heights, Hollis, Springfield Gardens, and St. Albans.

The Bronx experienced white flight, which was mostly confined to the South Bronx and mostly in the 1970s.

Staten Island is home to the oldest continuously settled free-black community in the United States, Sandy Ground. This community along the Southwestern shore of Staten Island was once home to thousands of free-black men and women, who came to Staten Island to work as oystermen. Members of this community also settled and established communities on the North Shore, such as West New Brighton and Port Richmond after oyster fishing became scarce in 1916. Many African Americans settled in several North Shore communities during the Great Migration, such as Arlington, Mariners Harbor, and New Brighton. Although the black community of Staten Island is mostly dispersed throughout the North Shore of the Island, there are several African Americans living on the South Shore.

=== West African ===
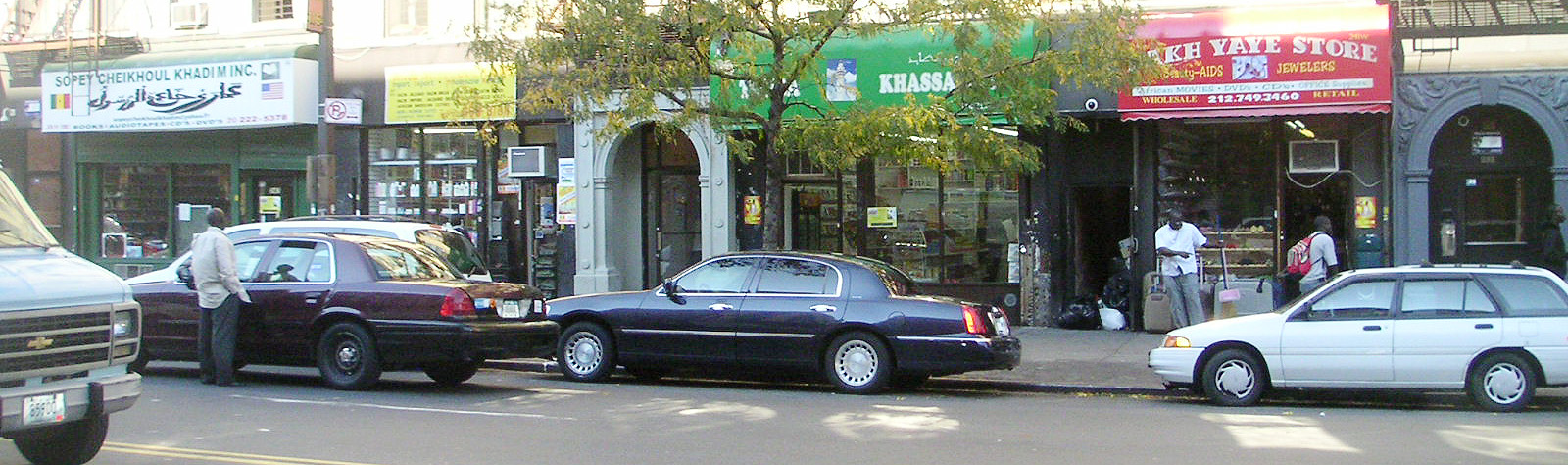
Stores in Le Petit Senegal.

There is at least one community of West Africans in New York, concentrated in Le Petit Senegal in Harlem, Manhattan. The enclave is situated on 116th Street between St. Nicholas and 8th Avenues, and is home to a large number of Francophone West Africans.

An enclave of Liberians developed in Staten Island at the end of the 20th century, following the turbulent Liberian Civil War.

== Caribbean ==
The first reported Caribbean immigrant to the New York area was Juan Rodriguez, a sailor who arrived by ship in what is now Manhattan in 1613. He came from the Spanish colony of La Española, the island now home to the Dominican Republic and Haiti. Since then, Caribbean communities have grown throughout the region. As of 2026, Caribbean immigrants account for 5.41 percent of New York’s population.

According to the 2010 US Census data on brooklyn.com there are approximately 370,000 (16.4%) Caribbean descendants in Brooklyn. That figure includes persons who identify as Dominican (3.3%), but does not include the (7.4%) Puerto Rican population. Including Puerto Ricans, there are approximately 560,000 (23.8%) persons of Caribbean descent in Brooklyn. Similar, but not identical demographics in America exist in Miami, but there are fewer people of Cuban descent in New York. Overtime this number has increased, the 2024 Brooklyn Community Boards Demographic Report, estimates that 17% or an estimate 445,000 people of Brooklyn's population is of Caribbean/West Indian or Caribbean Hispanic ancestry.

=== Reasons for Immigrating and Enclave Formation ===
Caribbean immigrants, like immigrants generally, come to the U.S. for many reasons, including economic opportunities, family reunification, escape from political unrest, and educational opportunities. These reasons for migrating to the U.S., particularly to major metropolitan areas in New York and New Jersey, are associated with the pattern of chain migration. Chain migration is the social process through which immigrants from the same place follow one another to a new location within or outside their country of origin. This pattern helps explain Caribbean enclaves in New York, including Little Caribbean and Crown Heights in Brooklyn, New York. Additionally, chain migration allows ethnic populations to concentrate in particular urban districts, welcoming successive arrivals through family connections and preserving those social ties.

Another related pattern is known as “stepwise migration.” Stepwise migration is a strategic form of migration in which “low-capital migrants” move incrementally, first accumulating financial resources and building social and human capital, then gaining legal entry and bringing more family members to their current location. Research conducted on families in Trinidad and Tobago further illustrates the social costs of migration for Caribbean households. Parents who migrate for economic opportunities may rely on extended relatives to care for their children, supporting them financially from abroad while being unable to parent their children in person.

=== Housing Affordability and Employment ===
When choosing where to settle in the U.S., Caribbean immigrants consider factors such as housing affordability and access to employment. Around 67% of Caribbean immigrants in the U.S. live in a handful of major metropolitan areas, primarily New York and Miami, followed by Boston, Orlando, and Tampa. Moving to these major cities offers access to public transportation systems. In addition, proximity to urban employment corridors reduces commuting costs and increases employment options. New York is a major employment corridor. Caribbean immigrants may seek employment in New York City but the consistent increase in costs make living near these jobs financially straining. This creates an incentive to settle in surrounding communities where housing is more affordable while employment remains accessible. Data from the Center For Migration Studies confirms that while immigrants make up 44% of New York City's workforce, an acute housing affordability crisis is actively driving a suburban migration pattern to surrounding communities.

In addition, public transportation can expand the geographic areas in which immigrants can realistically live and work. However, immigrants who depend on public transportation may also have fewer viable housing options in communities without reliable transit access. This consideration is just one factor contributing to why immigrants choose to live in established Caribbean communities along with cultural familiarity, social networks, and community support. However, housing prices, employment locations, transportation access, and potentially discriminatory housing practices may also restrict their residential choices. Additionally, The financial circumstances of Caribbean immigrants further complicate their ability to secure affordable housing in major metropolitan areas. Although immigrants arrive in the United States from different socioeconomic backgrounds, research indicates that Caribbean immigrants experience lower household incomes than other immigrant populations. According to the Migration Policy Institute, the median annual household income of Caribbean immigrants in 2024 was approximately $66,500, compared to $82,400 for immigrant households overall. In comparison, Indian immigrant households reported a median annual income of approximately $176,200. These income disparities are particularly significant when examining the residential options available to Caribbean immigrants.

=== Race and Residential Segregation ===
Caribbean-dominant settlement areas experience high and persistent racial and socioeconomic segregation, even after accounting for socioeconomic status. Not all immigrants who migrate to the U.S. are Black, but those who are may face a “double minority” tax, encountering barriers as both immigrants and Black individuals. While “White-passing” immigrants can achieve “spatial assimilation” by moving into predominantly White suburbs, a study found that socioeconomic differences did not fully explain the residential segregation experienced by the Caribbean populations it examined. Because racial barriers can restrict movement into other neighborhoods, Caribbean immigrants often remain within their ethnic enclaves. Nevertheless, these communities help preserve traditions and provide support.

One study argues that West Indian immigrants used real estate expertise and community resources to overcome racial barriers to homeownership in New York. West Indian brokers identified White homeowners willing to sell to Black buyers for higher prices, helping immigrants purchase homes in otherwise exclusionary neighborhoods. Caribbean buyers’ efforts to overcome racial exclusion highlight the importance of legal protections against housing discrimination. The Fair Housing Act prohibits discrimination based on race and national origin in the sale or rental of housing, protecting Caribbean immigrants who encounter these barriers. In New York, these protections prohibit landlords and real estate agents from denying housing or directing Caribbean immigrants toward particular neighborhoods because of their race or national origin. When screening applicants, housing providers must apply rental requirements equally rather than impose different standards based on an applicant’s country of origin.

In a City Limits’ article, immigrants from Barbados, purchased a home in Brooklyn's Bedford-Stuyvesant neighborhood during the 1950s. Although they became homeowners, their decision to settle in Bedford-Stuyvesant occurred against the backdrop of White flight, as White residents increasingly relocated from Central Brooklyn to predominantly White neighborhoods in Flatbush, Queens, and Long Island. Over time, the neighborhood became home to Black families from the Caribbean, the American South, and Central America. This experience demonstrates how Caribbean immigrants could achieve homeownership while still confronting racial barriers that limited their residential options.

=== Community Life in New York ===
Caribbean enclaves in New York serve as centers of cultural preservation, social connection, and civic participation. In Brooklyn, Little Caribbean brings together restaurants, markets, public art, and gathering spaces that reflect residents’ Caribbean heritage. In Queens, the Guyanese and Trinidadian communities of Richmond Hill and South Ozone Park maintain cultural ties through celebrations such as Phagwah, familiar foods, and local advocacy organizations. These connections extend beyond cultural traditions. Together, these activities help explain how enclaves maintain a lasting role across generations. They offer places where residents can share familiar customs, build relationships, and preserve connections to their countries of origin while participating in American public life. Understanding these neighborhoods therefore requires attention to both the barriers that influence settlement and the community institutions that give residents reasons to remain connected.

=== Guyanese, Surinamese, Jamaican, and Trinidadian ===
New York City has large Guyanese, Surinamese, and Trinidadian communities, which not only includes Afro-Caribbeans, but also Indo-Caribbeans; Indo-Guyanese, Indo-Surinamese, Indo-Jamaican, and Indo-Trinidadian (Indo-Caribbean Americans). The largest one is in Ozone Park, Queens, on the area located in between 101st and Liberty Avenues; this neighborhood extends to Richmond Hill, along Liberty Avenue between Lefferts Boulevard and the Van Wyck Expressway. Guyanese and Trinidadians in New York City number around 227,582 as of 2014.

Indo-Guyanese, Indo-Jamaican, and, Indo-Surinamese, Indo-Trinidadians originated in India. After the abolition of slavery, and formerly enslaved Blacks refused to continue working for their former owners on the plantations, South Asians were brought to Guyana, Suriname, Jamaica, Trinidad and Tobago, and other parts of the Caribbean to work as indentured servants. These South Asians were mostly Hindu, but there were also Muslims, and Christians who were brought from India. A majority of these South Asians spoke Bhojpuri or Caribbean Hindustani. The descendants of these indentured servants later immigrated to New York City and to other places around the world, such as Toronto. In NYC, they mostly live in Richmond Hill and Ozone Park, which have many Hindu, Muslim, and Christian people.

Afro-Guyanese, Afro-Surinamese and Afro-Trinidadians live in neighborhoods like Canarsie or Flatbush in Brooklyn. However, a majority of the Jamaican population is Black, as Indo-Jamaicans form an extremely small minority.

The largest population of Jamaican Americans in the United States can be found in New York State. About 3.5% of the population of Brooklyn is of Jamaican heritage. In 1655, Jamaica was captured by the British, who brought African slaves in large numbers to work on plantations. The African slaves were emancipated in 1838, and owners starting paying wages to workers, who were now free to immigrate to the United States. Many Jamaicans immigrated in the years following 1944, when the United States economy was rebuilding from World War II, seeing opportunity. After 1965, when immigration quotas were lifted, Jamaican immigration skyrocketed again.

Jamaican neighborhoods include Queens Village and Jamaica in Queens; Crown Heights, East Flatbush, Flatbush in Brooklyn, and Wakefield, Williamsbridge and Tremont in the Bronx.

=== Haitian ===
According to the 2000 census, there are about 200,000 Haitians/Haitian Americans in Brooklyn, showing that it is home to the largest number of Haitian immigrants in New York City. The neighborhood that has the largest Haitian community in New York is Flatbush. The 2010 US Census indicates that 3% of Brooklynites are of Haitian descent. On Flatbush Avenue, Nostrand Avenue and Church Avenue it is possible to find Haitian businesses and restaurants. Other prominent Haitian neighborhoods include Prospect Heights, Bensonhurst, Park Slope, East Flatbush, Lefferts Gardens, Bushwick, Canarsie, Midwood, Crown Heights, Flatlands and Kensington in Brooklyn as well as Springfield Gardens, South Jamaica, Hollis, Queens Village, Cambria Heights, Laurelton and Rosedale in Queens.

==== Haitian Migration and Temporary Protected Status (TPS) ====
On January 12, 2010, a 7.0-magnitude earthquake struck Haiti. According to the Disasters Emergency Committee, approximately 3.5 million people were affected, and an estimated 220,000 die. On January 15, 2010, Secretary of Homeland Security Janet Napolitano announced that Haiti would receive Temporary Protected Status (TPS), allowing eligible Haitian nationals already in the United States to remain temporarily and obtain work authorization. In 2011, Haiti’s redesignation expanded eligibility to qualifying individuals who had continuously resided in the United States since January 12, 2011, and met additional requirements.

On November 28, 2025, Secretary of Homeland Security Kristi Noem, under the Trump administration, announced the termination of Haiti's TPS designation, effective February 3, 2026. Noem determined that Haiti no longer met the conditions necessary to maintain TPS designation under the Immigration and Nationality Act. However, the termination was subsequently challenged in federal court, temporarily preventing its implementation. On June 25, 2026, the Supreme Court ruled in Mullin v. Doe and the consolidated Haitian case, Trump v. Miot, that statutory challenges to the TPS terminations were barred from judicial review. The Court also found that the Haitian plaintiffs’ equal protection claim was unlikely to succeed and therefore did not justify interim relief. According to the National Immigration Forum, Haiti’s TPS termination took effect on August 4, 2026, after the district court lifted its order postponing the termination.

According to a December 2025 news article, Haitian families in Flatbush expressed their concerns about deportation and the disruption of their lives. One Haitian mother, identified by the pseudonym Sophie, described the fear of potentially returning to Haiti with her two young children after finding stability in Brooklyn. Porez Luxama, president of Life of Hope, a Brooklyn-based nonprofit organization assisting Haitian immigrants, reported that community organizations experienced an increase in calls from families seeking guidance about school enrollment, housing benefits, and potential relocation. The reaction is one example of how the termination of TPS created uncertainty around the stability of Haitian families residing in established immigrant communities.

== South, East and Southeast Asian ==
=== South Asian ===
==== Bangladeshi ====
As of 2013, there are more than 74,000 Bangladeshis in New York City, a majority of whom reside in the boroughs of Queens and Brooklyn. The Bangladeshis in New York tend to form enclaves in neighborhoods predominantly populated by Indian Americans. These enclaves include one in Kensington, featuring Bangladeshi grocers, hairdressers, and halal markets. Kensington's enclave was formed in the mid-1990s as a small community of Bangladeshi shops. Bangladeshis have tried to leave a permanent legacy, making a failed attempt to rename McDonald Avenue after Sheikh Mujibur Rahman, the first president of Bangladesh which was not backed by the surrounding residents of that area, they however within themselves have nicknamed the area Bangla Town.

The largest Bangladeshi enclave is on 73rd Street in Jackson Heights, which they share with the Indian, Pakistani and Filipinos of that area. As well as one on Hillside Avenue in Queens, and one in Parkchester. As well as living alongside the Indians, Bangladeshis own many of the Indian restaurants in Brooklyn and Queens.

==== Indian ====
Indian Americans are another group that has settled in New York City, forming a few different ethnic enclaves. One of these is called "Curry Row" and is in the East Village, Manhattan, centered on 6th Street between 1st and 2nd Avenues, another is called "Curry Hill" or "Little India", centered on Lexington Avenue between 26th and 31st Streets, and another is in Jackson Heights, Queens, centered on 74th Street between Roosevelt and 37th Avenue.

Richmond Hill is another "Little India" community. This area has the largest Sikh population in the New York City area. It is also known as "Little Punjab". There is also a "Little Indo-Caribbean" community in Richmond Hill with many Indo-Caribbean Americans.

Some of the region's main centers of Indian culture are located in central New Jersey, particularly in Middlesex County. In Edison, New Jersey, ethnic Asian Indians represent more than 28% of the population, the highest percentage of any place in the United States with more than 1,000 residents identifying their ancestry. The Oak Tree Road area, which crosses through Edison and Iselin is a growing cultural hub with high concentrations of Indian stores and restaurants.

There have been three major waves of Indian immigrants, the first between 1899 and 1913, the second after India was granted independence from the United Kingdom in 1947, and the third after the immigration quota for individual countries was lifted in 1965. As of 2010, the New York City metropolitan area contains the largest Asian Indian population in North America.

==== Pakistani ====
Pakistani Americans have a large presence in New York, with the city (along with New Jersey) hosting the largest Pakistani population of any region in the United States. The population of Pakistanis in New York City is estimated at 54,335; they are settled primarily in the boroughs of Brooklyn (specifically the neighborhoods of Kensington and Midwood) and Queens (more specifically Jackson Heights and Fresh Meadows). These numbers make Pakistani Americans the fifth largest Asian American group in New York City. As of 2006, more than 50,000 people of Pakistani descent were said to be living in New York City. This figure rises to between 60,000 and 70,000 when illegal immigrants are also included. Pakistani migration to New York has occurred heavily only since the past two to three decades, reflecting the history of Pakistani migration elsewhere in the country; "Little Pakistans" or ethnic enclaves populated by Pakistanis tend to be characterized and populated by other South Asian Americans as well, including Indians and thus are dominated by South Asian culture. Pakistani restaurants, grocery markets and halal shops are abound in such areas.

==== Sri Lankan ====
Many Sri Lankan people settle in Tompkinsville, Staten Island, which has one of the highest concentrations of Sri Lankans outside of their native country. More than 5,000 Sri Lankans live in Staten Island. The Sri Lankan commercial center is at the corner of Victory Boulevard and Cebra Avenue. They often hold festive New Year celebrations on Staten Island, including a traditional oil-lighting ceremony, live baila music, and competitive events like coconut-scraping and bun-eating contests.

=== East Asian ===
==== Chinese ====
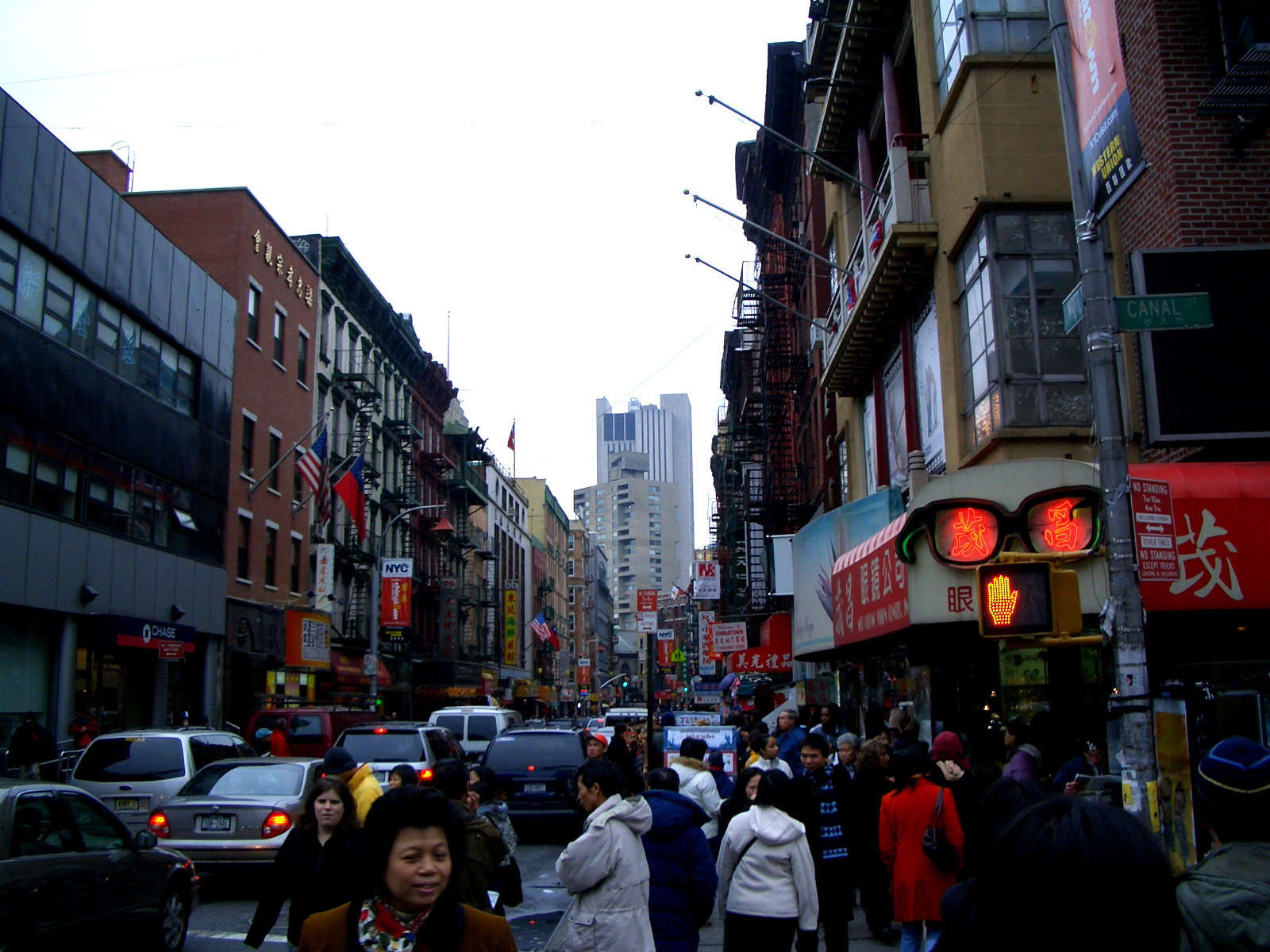
An intersection in Manhattan Chinatown

Until the late 20th century, the Chinese population was limited to one area in lower Manhattan. The New York metropolitan area contains the largest ethnic Chinese population outside of Asia, enumerating an estimated 735,019 individuals as of 2012, including at least 350,000 foreign born Chinese as of 2013, making them the city's second largest ethnic group. The Chinese population in the New York City area is dispersed across at least 9 Chinatowns, comprising the original Manhattan Chinatown, three in Queens (the Flushing Chinatown, the Elmhurst Chinatown, and the newly emerged Chinatown in Corona), three in Brooklyn (the Sunset Park Chinatown, the Avenue U Chinatown, and the new Bensonhurst Chinatown), and one each in Edison and Nassau County, Long Island, not to mention fledgling ethnic Chinese enclaves emerging throughout the New York City metropolitan area. Chinese Americans, as a whole, have had a (relatively) long tenure in New York City. New York City's satellite Chinatowns in Queens and Brooklyn are thriving as traditionally urban enclaves, as large-scale Chinese immigration continues into New York. As of 2023, Chinese immigration across the US southern border to New York City, especially to Queens and its Flushing Chinatown, was increasing, and a significant new wave of Chinese Uyghur Muslims is fleeing religious persecution in northwestern China's Xinjiang Province and seeking religious freedom in New York.

===== Manhattan =====
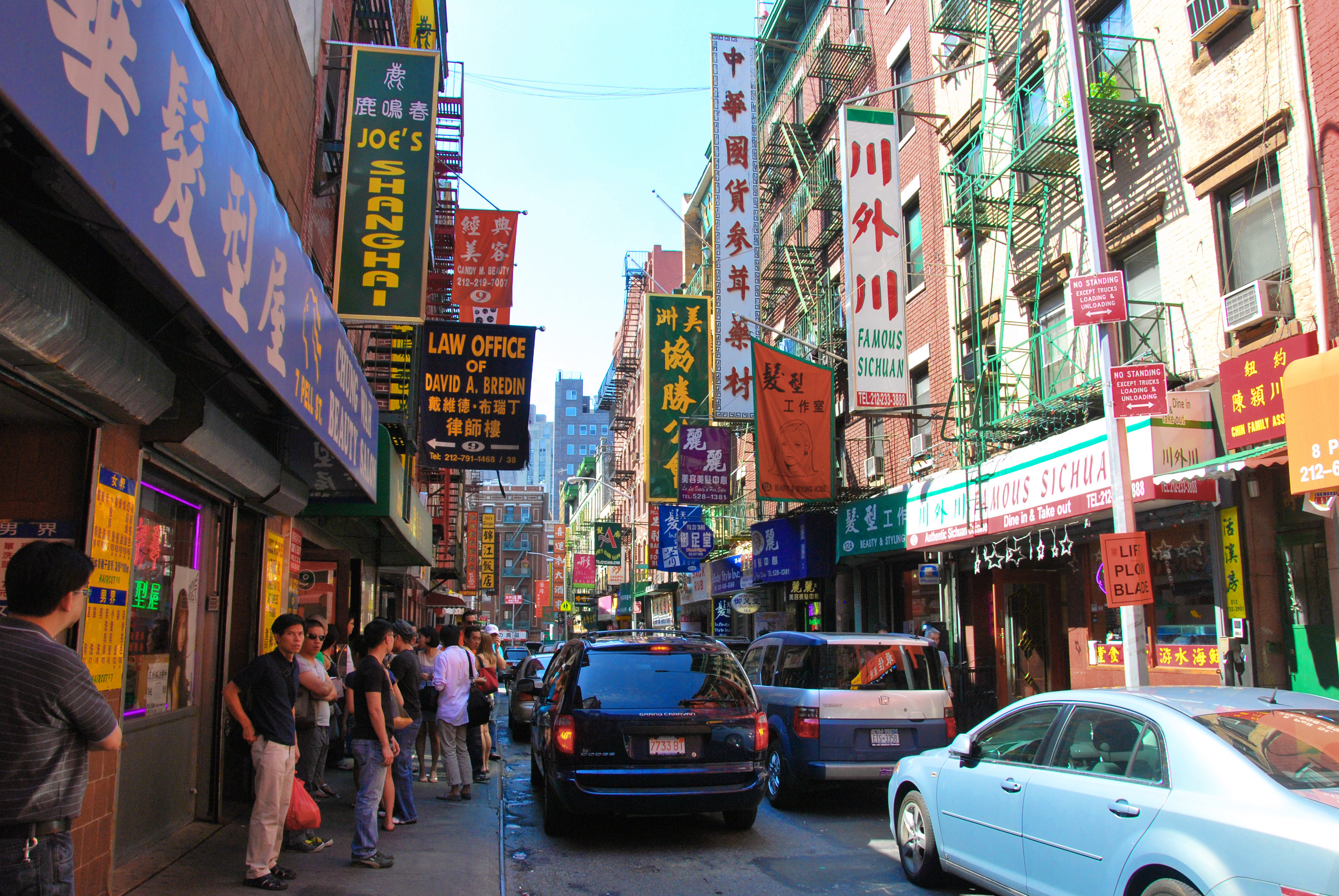
Manhattan Chinatown

The first Chinese immigrants came to lower Manhattan trickling in during the 18th century (1700s) for trade, and sometimes remaining to marry and live in New York City; during the 1840s California Gold Rush, Chinese immigrants headed to the Pacific coast region to join searchers for gold, and worked on railroads and in small towns of the west coast. By 1880, the enclave around Five Points was estimated to have from 200 to as many as 1,100 members. However, the Chinese Exclusion Act, which went into effect in 1882, caused an abrupt decline in the number of Chinese who immigrated to New York and the rest of the United States. Later, with the Magnuson Act of 1943, the exclusion act was repealed, and the community's population gradually increased until 1968, when the quota was lifted and the Chinese American population grew again. Today, the Manhattan Chinatown (simplified Chinese: 纽约华埠; traditional Chinese: 紐約華埠; pinyin: Niǔyuē Huá Bù) is among the largest in the US, along with those in San Francisco and Los Angeles; the Chinatowns in New York City (including those in boroughs other than Manhattan, such as in Flushing, Queens) are some of the largest Chinese enclaves outside of Asia. Within Manhattan's expanding Chinatown lies a "Little Fuzhou" on East Broadway and surrounding streets, occupied predominantly by immigrants from the Fujian Province of mainland China. Areas surrounding the "Little Fuzhou" consist mostly of Cantonese immigrants from Guangdong Province, the earlier Chinese settlers, and in some areas moderately of Cantonese immigrants. In the past few years, however, the Cantonese dialect that has dominated Chinatown for decades is being rapidly swept aside by Mandarin, the national language of China and the lingua franca of most of the latest Chinese immigrants. The energy and population of Manhattan's Chinatown are fueled by relentless, massive immigration from mainland China, both legal and illegal in origin, propagated in large part by New York's high density, extensive mass transit system, and huge economic marketplace.

The early settlers of Manhattan's Chinatown were mostly from Hong Kong and from Taishan of the Guangdong Province of China, which are Cantonese-speaking, and also from Shanghai. They form most of the Chinese population of the area surrounded by Mott and Canal Streets. The later settlers, from Fuzhou, Fujian, form the Chinese population of the area bounded by East Broadway. Chinatown's modern borders are roughly Grand Street on the north, Broadway on the west, Chrystie Street on the east, and East Broadway to the south. Little Fuzhou, a prime destination status for immigrants from the Fujian Province of China, is another, Fuzhouese, enclave in Chinatown and the Lower East Side of Manhattan. Manhattan's Little Fuzhou is centered on the street of East Broadway. The neighborhood is named for the western portion of the street, which is primarily populated by mainland Chinese immigrants, (primarily Foochowese from Fuzhou, Fujian). The smaller, eastern portion has traditionally been home to a large number of Jews, Puerto Ricans, and African Americans.

In recent years, however, the Chinese population in Manhattan's Chinatown has been declining due to gentrification and the reduction in new Chinese immigrants, mainly as a result of deteriorating relations between China and the United States.

===== Queens =====
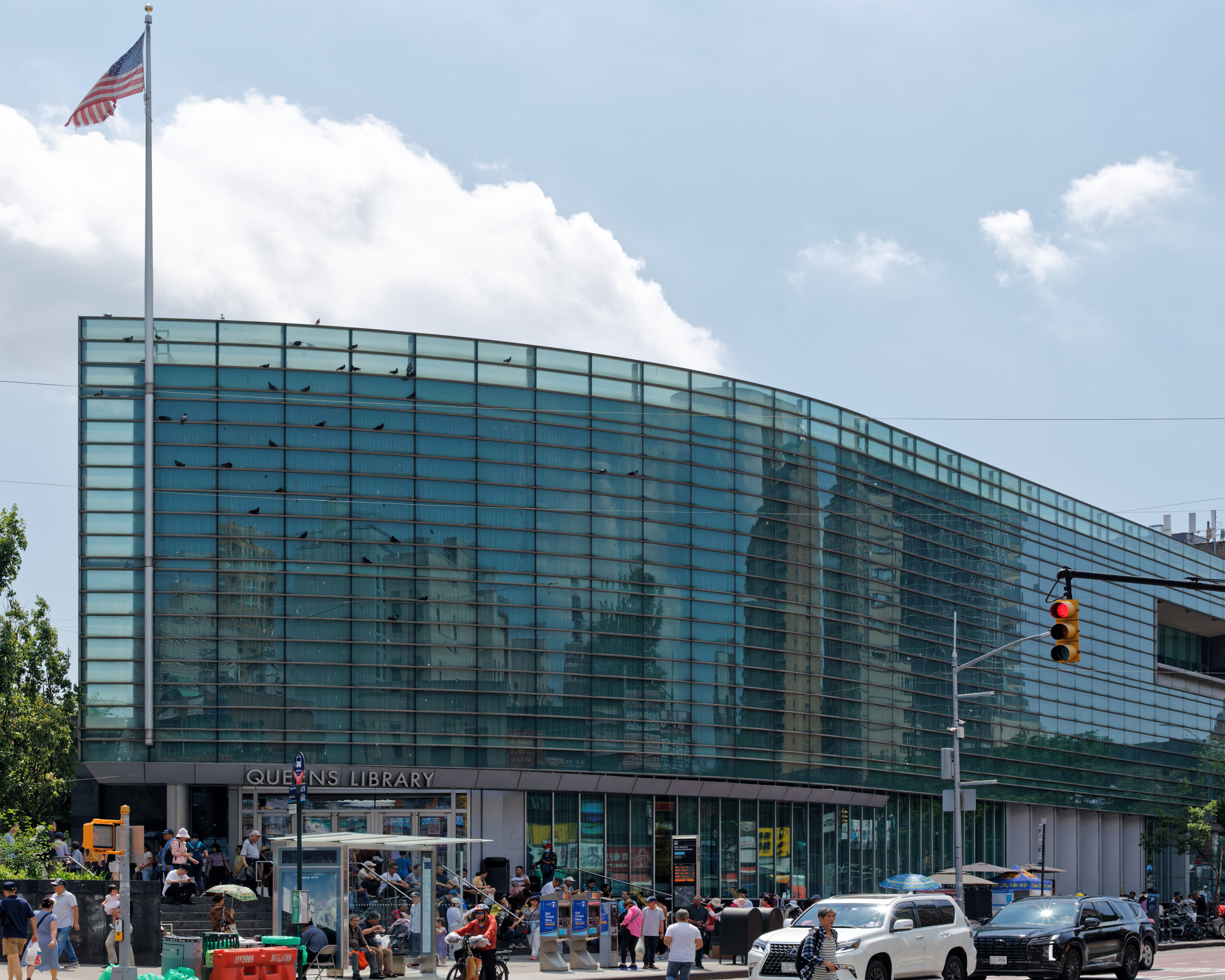
Queens Library in Flushing Chinatown, the first satellite of the original Manhattan Chinatown.

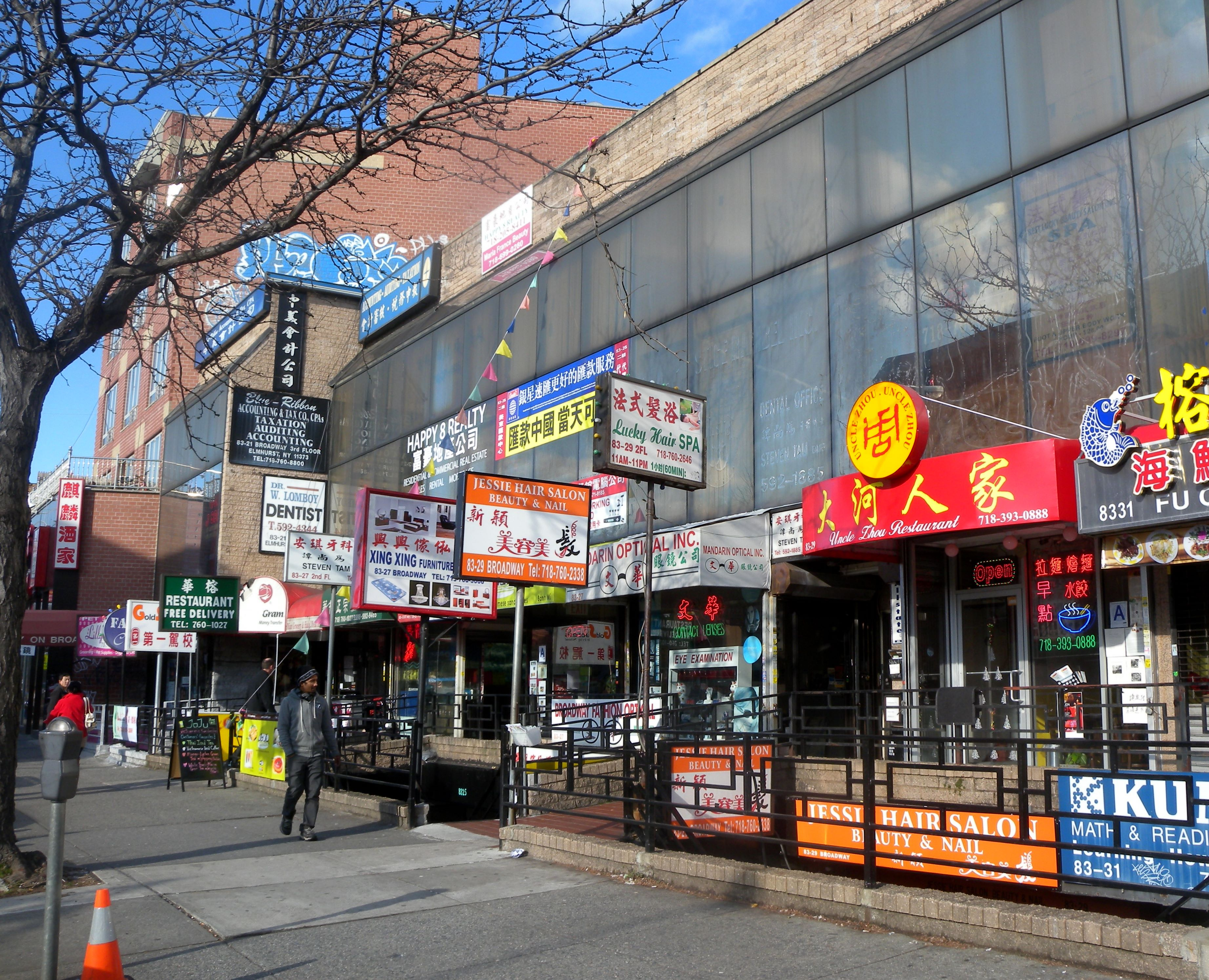
The Elmhurst Chinatown on Broadway, now a satellite of the Flushing Chinatown in Queens itself.

The present Flushing Chinatown, in the Flushing area of the borough of Queens, was predominantly non-Hispanic white and Japanese until the 1970s when Taiwanese began a surge of immigration, followed by other groups of Chinese. By 1990, Asians constituted 41% of the population of the core area of Flushing, with Chinese in turn representing 41% of the Asian population. However, ethnic Chinese are constituting an increasingly dominant proportion. A 1986 estimate by the Flushing Chinese Business Association approximated 60,000 Chinese in Flushing alone. The popular styles of Chinese cuisine are ubiquitously accessible in Flushing Chinatown, including Taiwanese, Shanghainese, Hunanese, Sichuanese, Cantonese, Fujianese, Xinjiang, Zhejiang, and Korean Chinese cuisine. Even the relatively obscure Dongbei style of cuisine indigenous to Northeast China is now available in Flushing Chinatown, as well as Mongolian cuisine. Mandarin Chinese (including Northeastern Mandarin), Fuzhou dialect, Min Nan Fujianese, Wu Chinese, Beijing dialect, Wenzhounese, Shanghainese, Suzhou dialect, Hangzhou dialect, Changzhou dialect, Cantonese, Taiwanese, and English are all prevalently spoken in Flushing Chinatown, while the Mongolian language is now emerging.

Elmhurst, another neighborhood in Queens, also has a large and growing Chinese community.

===== Brooklyn =====
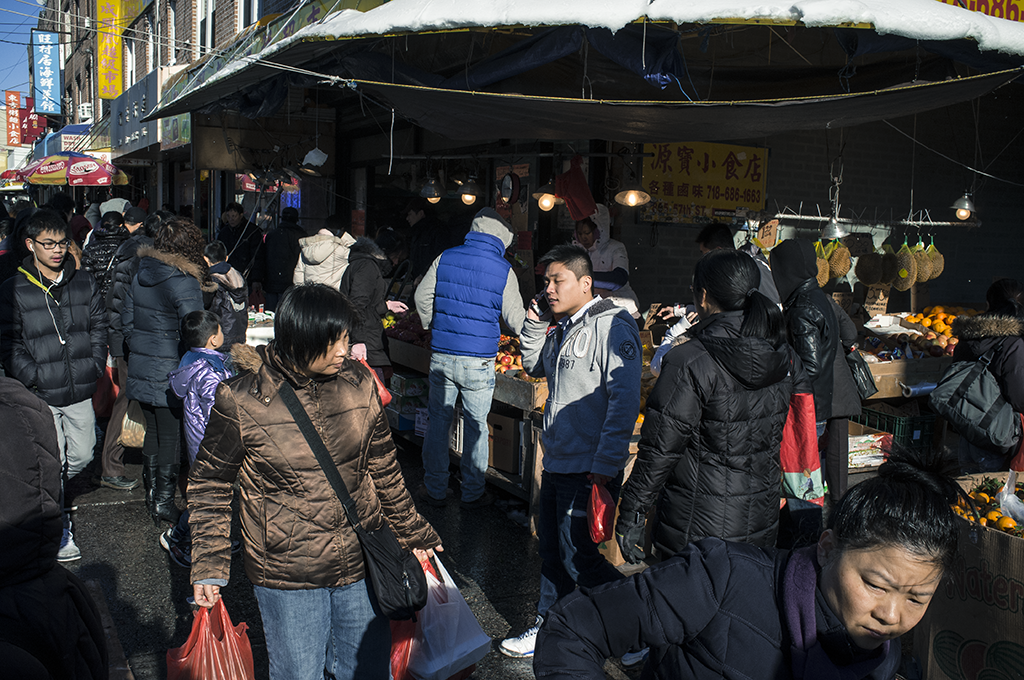
One of the Brooklyn Chinatowns

By 1988, 90% of the storefronts on Eighth Avenue in Sunset Park, in southern Brooklyn, had been abandoned. Chinese immigrants then moved into this area, not only new arrivals from China, but also members of Manhattan's Chinatown, seeking refuges from high rents, who fled to the cheap property costs and rents of Sunset Park and formed the Brooklyn Chinatown, which now extends for 20 blocks along Eighth Avenue, from 42nd to 62nd Streets. This relatively new but rapidly growing Chinatown located in Sunset Park was originally settled by Cantonese immigrants like Manhattan's Chinatown in the past, but is now being repopulated by Fujianese (including Fuzhou people) and Wenzhounese immigrants.

Another Chinatown has developed in southern Brooklyn, on Avenue U in the Homecrest area, as evidenced by the growing number of Chinese-run fruit markets, restaurants, beauty and nail salons, and computer and general electronics dealers, spread among a community formerly composed mainly of Georgians, Vietnamese, Italians, Russians, and Greeks. The population of Homecrest in 2013 was more than 40% Chinese. Also emerging in southern Brooklyn, in the Bensonhurst neighborhood, below the BMT West End Line (D, R, and W trains) along on 86th Street between 18th Avenue and Stillwell Avenue, is Brooklyn's third Chinatown. The second Chinatown and the third, emerging Chinatown of Brooklyn are now increasingly carrying the majority of the Cantonese population in Brooklyn as the Cantonese dissipate from the main Brooklyn Chinatown in Sunset Park. With the migration of the Cantonese in Brooklyn now to Bensonhurst, and along with new Chinese immigration, small clusters of Chinese people and businesses in different parts of Bensonhurst have grown integrating with other ethnic groups and businesses. Smaller enclaves also exist in nearby Dyker Heights, Gravesend, and Bath Beach.

==== Japanese ====
As of the 2000 Census, over half of the 37,279 people of Japanese ancestry in New York State lived in New York City.

As of 2011 within the city the largest groups of Japanese residents are in Astoria, Queens and Yorkville on the Upper East Side of Manhattan. As of the 2010 U.S. census there are about 1,300 Japanese in Astoria and about 1,100 Japanese in Yorkville. 500 Japanese people lived in East Village. As of the same year, there are about 6,000 Japanese in Bergen County, New Jersey and 5,000 Japanese in Westchester County, New York. As of that year most short-term Japanese business executives in Greater New York City reside in Midtown Manhattan or in New York City suburbs. In 2011 Dolnick and Semple wrote that while other ethnic groups in the New York City region cluster in specific areas, the Japanese were distributed "thinly" and "without a focal point" such as Chinatown for the Chinese.

==== Korean ====
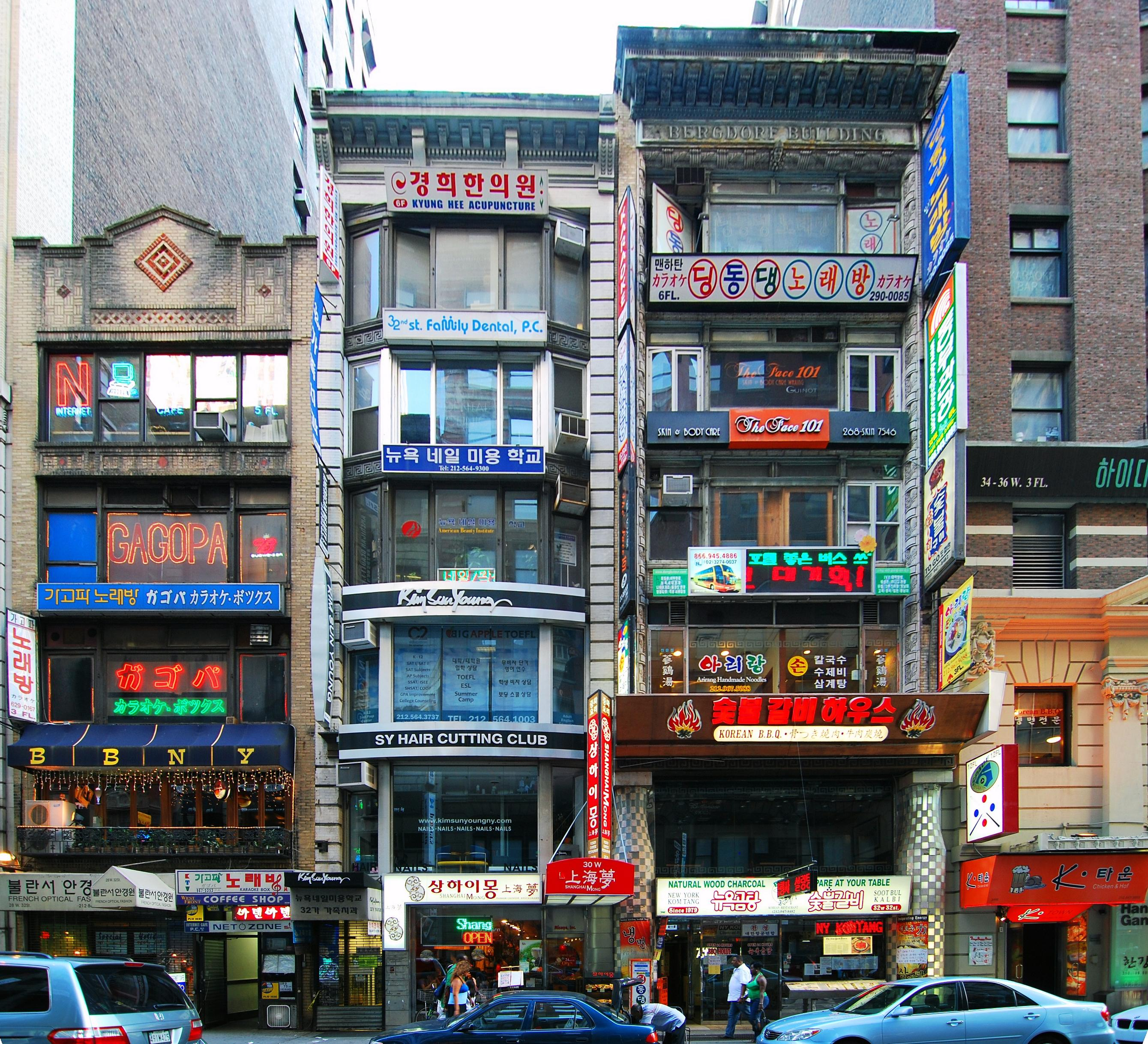
32nd street in Manhattan's Koreatown, 2009.

New York City is home to the second largest population of ethnic Koreans outside of Korea. Koreans started immigrating with the signing of the Korean-American Treaty of Amity and Commerce, which allowed them to do so freely. The first wave of Korean immigration lasted from 1903 to 1905, when 7,000 Koreans came to the United States. After this first wave, the 1907 "Gentlemen's Agreement" of President Theodore Roosevelt restricted Korean immigration to the United States. President Harry Truman repealed this in 1948. and from 1951 to 1964, another wave of Koreans migrated to the United States, and a third wave lasted from 1969 to 1987. As economic conditions improved in Korea, many Koreans chose to stay.

Korean communities in New York include Koreatown in Manhattan; Bedford Park in the Bronx as a small number, outplacing Puerto Ricans and Dominicans; and Sunnyside, Woodside, Elmhurst, Flushing, Murray Hill, Bayside, and Douglaston–Little Neck, in Queens. The Korean enclave in Flushing spread eastward across Queens and into Nassau County, forming a large Long Island Koreatown—. In Murray Hill—part of the large Long Island Koreatown—the station of the same name on the Long Island Rail Road is close to a row of Korean-owned businesses and a mainly Korean-speaking community; the neighborhood culminates with Meokjagolmok (Restaurant Street) with two dozen restaurants, bars, cafes, a bakery, and some karaoke establishments.

=== Southeast Asian ===
==== Burmese ====
The Burmese culture is very vibrant. However, there is not a large population of Burmese people in New York City. The Burmese community is spread throughout the five boroughs of New York City.

==== Filipino ====
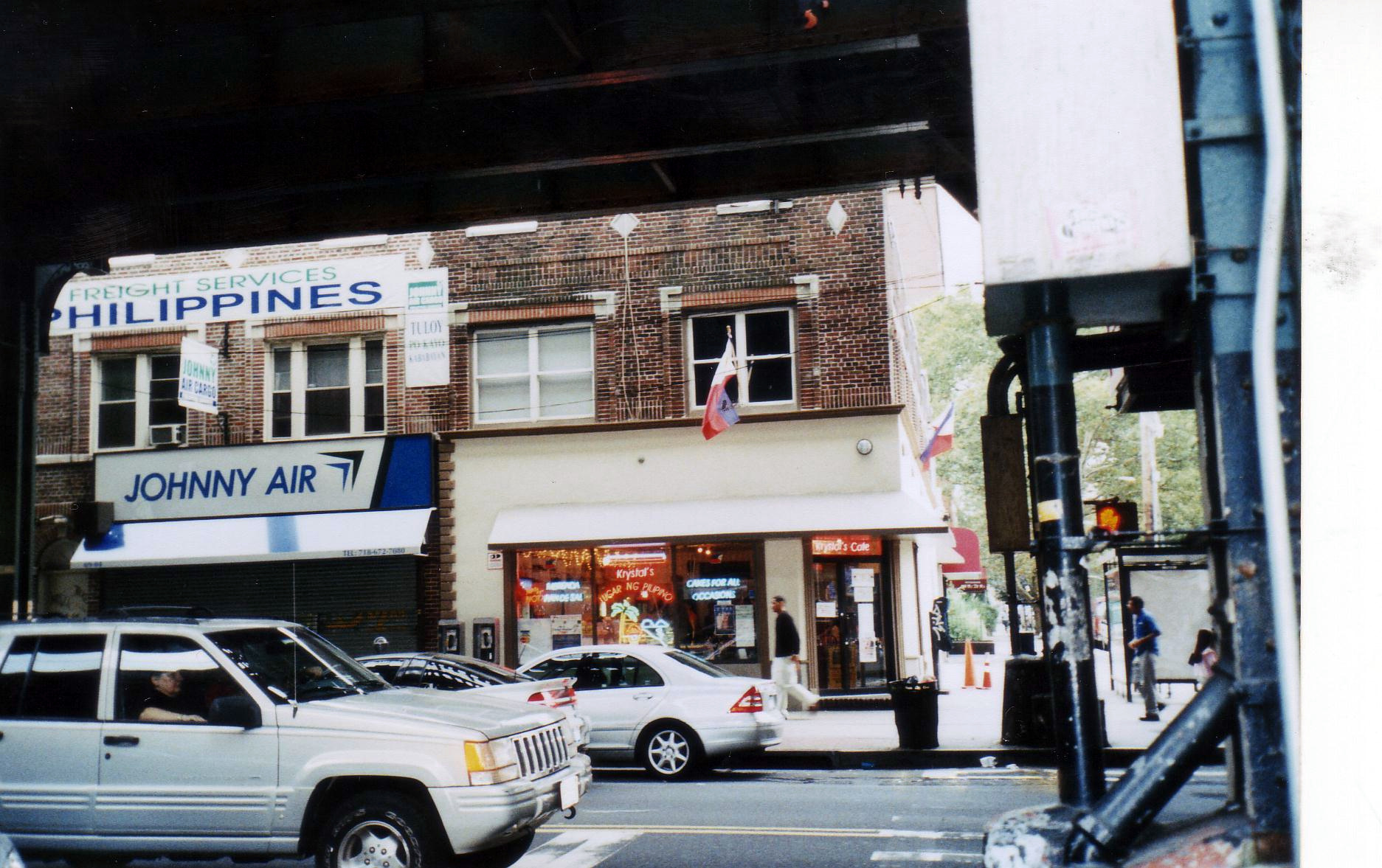
Little Manila on Roosevelt Avenue, Woodside, Queens

In Woodside, Queens, 13,000 out of 85,000 (~15%) of the population is Filipino. Woodside's "Little Manila" extends along Roosevelt Avenue.

The first Filipino settlement in the United States was Saint Malo, Louisiana, established in 1763. Mass immigration started in the late 19th century, to service the plantations of Hawaii and the farms of California. The immigration quota was lowered to 50 Filipinos a year, however, Filipinos in the United States Navy were exempt from this. Therefore, Filipinos settled near naval bases and formed ethnic enclaves due to discrimination. The quota was raised in the second half of the 20th century, starting another wave of Filipino immigration, looking for political freedom and opportunity, and one which has extended until present.

New York City was home to an estimated 82,313 Filipinos in 2011, representing a 7.7% increase from the estimated 77,191 in 2008, with 56%, or about 46,000, in Queens. Immigration from the Philippines began mainly after 1965, when immigration quotas that prevented Filipino immigration for many years were abolished. While there was earlier immigration from the Philippines, it was in low numbers and mainly concentrated in Hawaii and California. Since then, Filipinos have settled in Northeastern cities, with a majority in the New York City metropolitan area. Most of these immigrants have been professionals (doctors, nurses, other medical professions, accountants and engineers). The Filipino median household income in New York City was $81,929 in 2013, and 68% held a bachelor's degree or higher.

New York City annually hosts the Philippine Independence Day Parade, which is traditionally held on the first Sunday of June on Madison Avenue. The celebration occupies nearly twenty-seven city blocks which includes a 3.5-hour parade and an all-day long street fair and cultural performances. A Little Manila can be found in Woodside, in the borough of Queens. Filipinos are also concentrated in Jackson Heights and Elmhurst in Queens. There are also smaller Filipino communities in Jamaica, Queens and parts of Brooklyn. The Benigno Aquino Triangle is located on Hillside Avenue in Hollis, Queens to commemorate the slain Filipino political leader and to recognize the large Filipino American population in the area.

==== Vietnamese ====
There is a community of Vietnamese at the Bowery in an area unofficially known as "Little Saigon". The area is overshadowed by neighboring Chinatown in that it is relatively indistinguishable. The area, however, is marked by an abundance of Vietnamese restaurants. There is also another growing Vietnamese enclave in Flushing, Queens.

== European ==
Many European ethnic groups have formed enclaves in New York. These include Albanian, Croatian, German, Scandinavian, Hungarian, Greek, Irish, Italian, Polish, Romanian, Russian, Serbian and Ukrainian. There are British and French expatriate communities in New York City.

=== Albanian ===
Albanians first immigrated to the United States from Southern Italy and Greece in the 1920s. Later, in the 1990s, after the fall of communism in Eastern Europe, many Albanians flocked to the United States. Two neighborhoods that became Albanian are Belmont and Pelham Parkway.

In April 2012, it was reported by the New York Times that 9,500 people in the Bronx identify themselves as Albanian. Many live near Pelham Parkway and Allerton Ave in the Bronx. Recent census data estimates from 2020 indicate that 40,000 Albanians live in New York City across all five boroughs, with some estimates being higher by Albanian-American associations.

=== Bulgarian ===
Bulgarians had settled in the city around 1900 along avenues B and C at Third and Fourth streets on the Lower East Side.

=== Croatian ===
Croatians are concentrated in Queens.

=== Cypriot ===
There is a Cypriot community in New York City, mostly in Astoria in Queens. Many fled to New York due to the Turkish invasion of Cyprus in 1974.

=== Dutch ===
The Dutch were the earliest European ethnic group to have settled in New York City, as it was part of the New Netherlands colony. In the 19th and 20th centuries, the Dutch mainly lived in Midwood, Borough Park and Gravesend in Brooklyn and in Washington Heights in Manhattan.

=== French ===
Carroll Gardens in Brooklyn has seen an increase in French immigrants starting in the 21st century. Carroll Gardens and the surrounding neighborhoods are sometimes referred to as "Little France" or "Little Paris" due to the growing French population. Bastille Day celebrations are held on July 14 of each year.

=== German ===
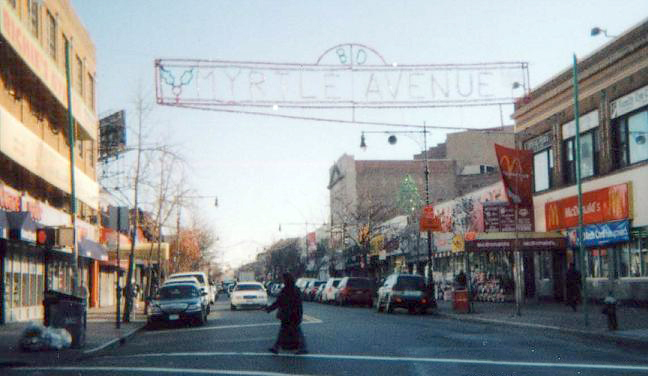
The Myrtle Avenue Business Improvement District runs from Wyckoff Avenue to Fresh Pond Road in Ridgewood.

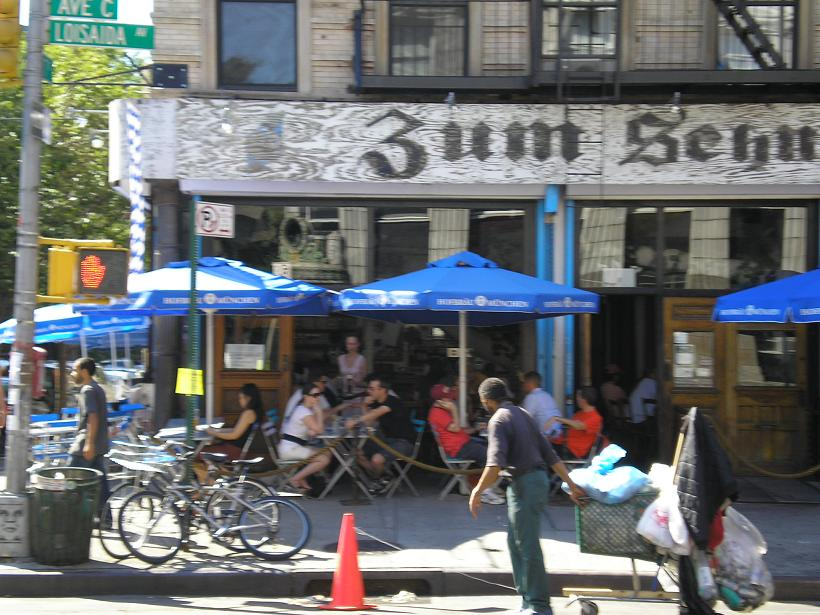
A German-themed pub in Loisaida/Little Germany

Germans started immigrating to the United States in the 17th century, and until the late 19th century, when Germany was the country of origin for the largest number of immigrants to the United States. In fact, Over one million Germans entered the United States in the 1850s alone.

German American ethnic enclaves in New York City include the now-defunct Little Germany, in Manhattan and the extant Yorkville, Manhattan. Little Germany, or as it was called in German, Kleindeutschland, was located on the Lower East Side, around Tompkins Square, in what would later become known as Alphabet City. The General Slocum disaster in 1904 wiped out the social core of the neighborhood, and many Germans moved to Yorkville. Yorkville, part of the Upper East Side, is bounded (roughly) by 79th Street to the south, 96th Street and Spanish Harlem to the north, the East River to the east, and Third Avenue to the west. The main artery of the neighborhood, 86th Street, has been called the "German Broadway". For much of the 20th century, Yorkville was inhabited by German and Hungarian Americans.

The Queens neighborhoods of Ridgewood, Maspeth, Glendale, and Middle Village include sizable populations of Germans. Ridgewood notably includes Gottschee expatriates from modern-day Slovenia.

At one point, Bushwick hosted a sizable German population active in the brewing industry. However, many moved to Queens during the later half of the 20th century. As a result of this, a section of Bushwick was called "Brewer's Row"—14 breweries operating in a 14-block area—by 1890. Thus, Bushwick was dubbed the "beer capital of the Northeast".

=== Greek ===
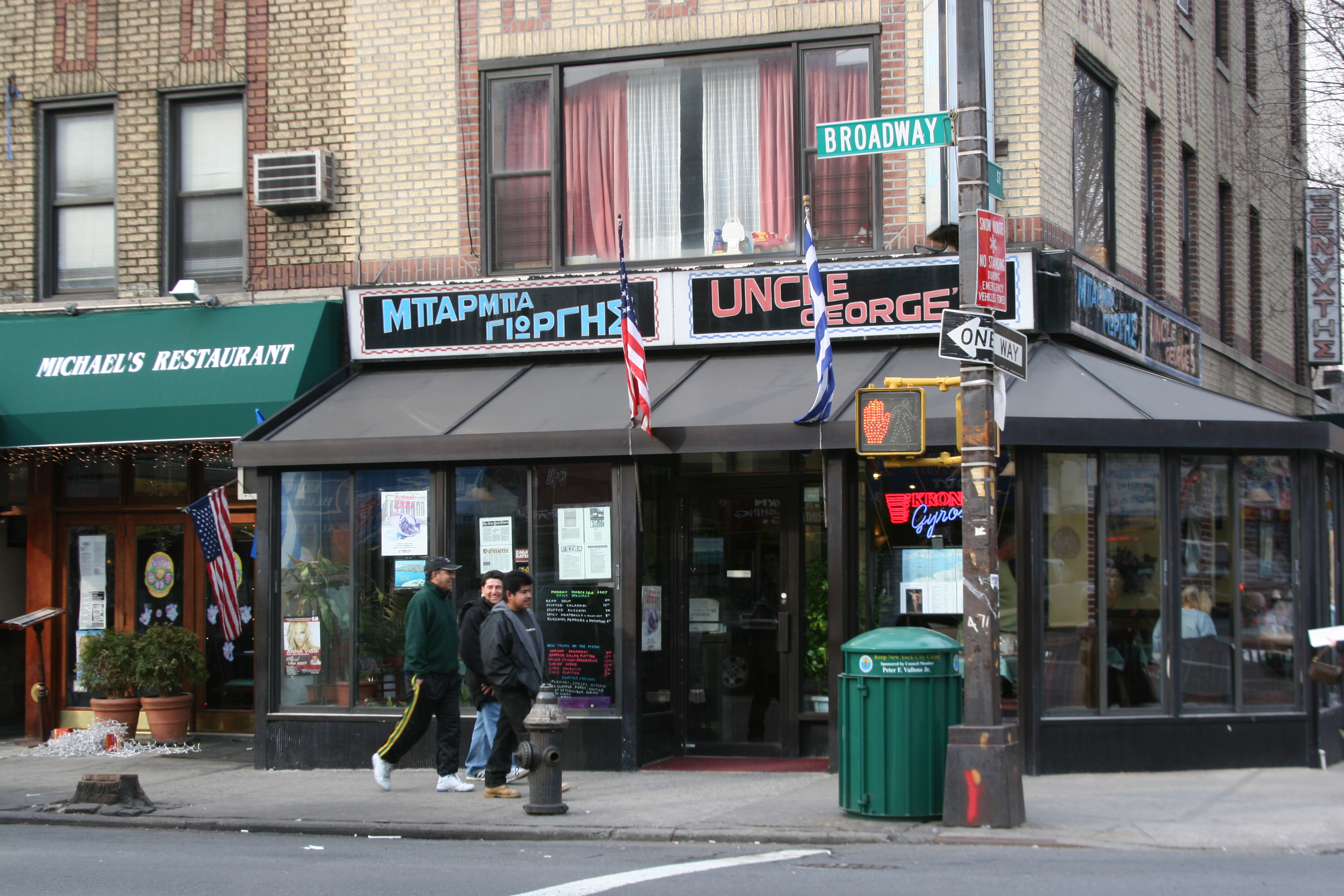
A Greek restaurant in Astoria

Astoria, Queens has the highest concentration of Greek Americans in New York City. There are Hellenic centers, Greek-owned businesses, and many Greek restaurants in the neighborhood. Astoria is diverse and has Mexican American, Colombian American, Russian American, and Italian American communities, as well. Between 2010 and 2024, the number of neighborhood residents claiming Greek ancestry declined.

Through the 1950s, most Greek New Yorkers lived in Manhattan. With a surge in Greek immigration in the 1960s, Astoria emerged as New York City's "Greektown." Between 1965 and 1975, about 150,000 Greek immigrants settled in the United States, with the majority settling in New York City. With most migrating for the economic opportunity, but as living conditions in Greece improved in the 1980s, Greek migration slowed. However, Astoria remains New York's "Greektown." During the 2010s, economic issues in Greece caused a resurgence of Greek immigration to Astoria. As of 2024, Queens County was home to nearly 22% of New York State's total Greek population.

=== Hungarian ===
79th Street in Yorkville, Manhattan was a hub for the Austro-Hungarian populace. This section of Yorkville was known as Little Hungary and had at one point nearly 20,000 Hungarians. Popular restaurants included the Viennese Lantern, Tokay, Hungarian Gardens, Robert Heller's Cafe Abbazia at 2nd Avenue, Budapest and the Debrecen. There were also a number of butcher stores and businesses that imported goods from Hungary. Churches included St. Stephen Catholic Church and the Hungarian Reformed Church on East 82nd Street. In 1956, due to the Hungarian Uprising, Yorkville saw a second wave of Hungarian migration into the neighborhood. While the population has somewhat declined, there are still some Hungarians left in Yorkville, as well as populations in Forest Hills, Queens and Williamsburg, Brooklyn.

=== Irish ===
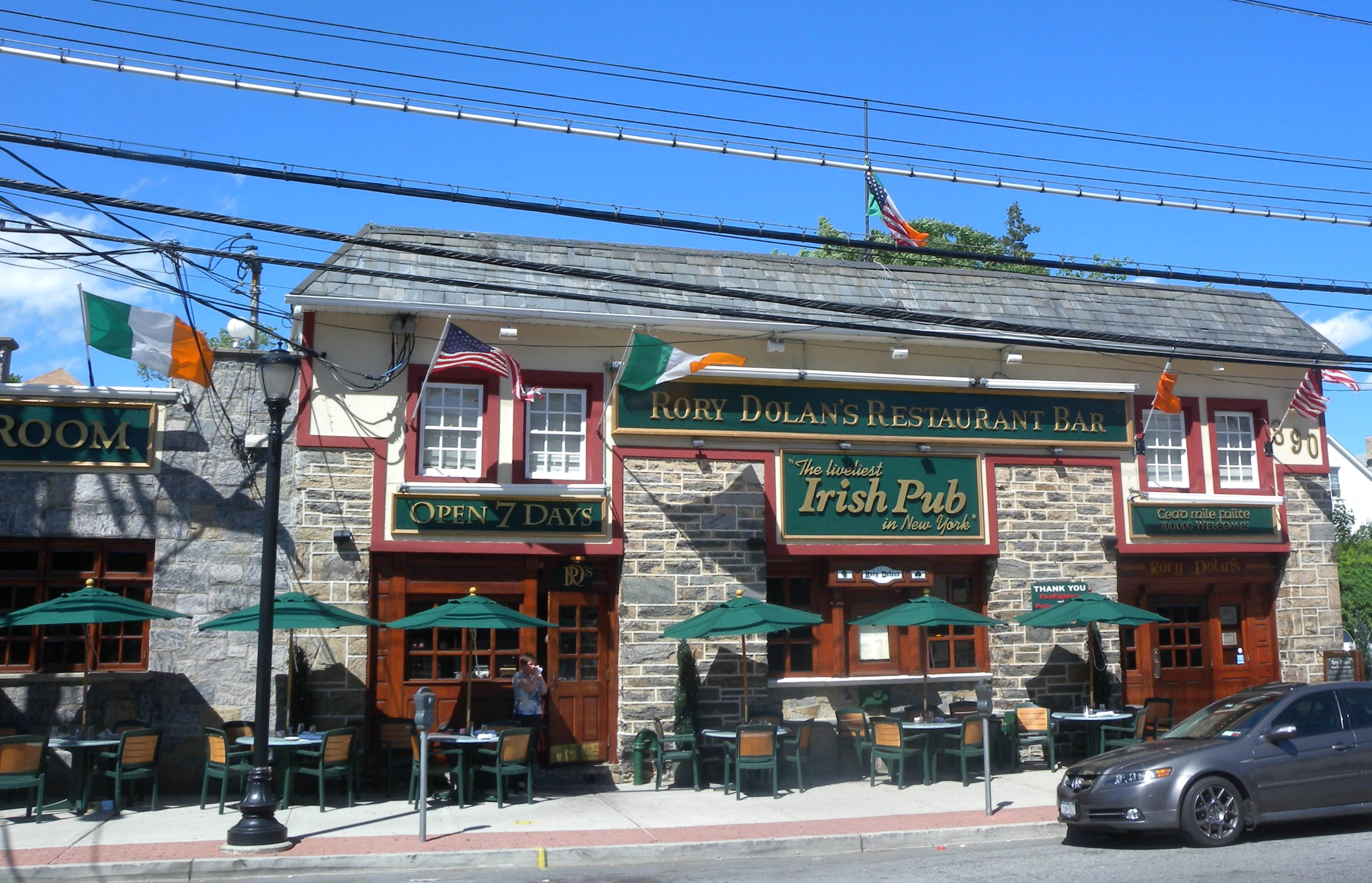
Rory Dolan's Irish pub in Woodlawn Heights

Irish Americans make up approximately 5.3% of New York City's population, composing the second largest non-Hispanic white ethnic group. Irish Americans first came to America in colonial years (pre-1776), with immigration rising in the 1820s due to poor living conditions in Ireland. But the largest wave of Irish immigration came after the Great Famine in 1845.

After they came, Irish immigrants often crowded into subdivided homes, only meant for one family, and cellars, attics, and alleys all became home for some Irish immigrants. In fact, New York once had more Irish people than Dublin itself. The Irish in New York developed a particular reputation for joining the New York City Police Department as well as the New York Fire Department.

This traditional connection between the Irish-American population and these services is reflected in the continued presence of Emerald Societies that serve as fraternal associations for law enforcement, fire service, and non-uniform civil service agencies.

Bay Ridge, Brooklyn, was originally developed as a resort for wealthy Manhattanites in 1879, but instead became a family-oriented Italian- and Irish-American community. Another large Irish-American community is located in Woodlawn Heights, Bronx, but Woodlawn Heights also has a mix of different ethnic groups. One large Irish community in Manhattan was Hell's Kitchen. Other sizable Irish-American communities include Belle Harbor and Breezy Point, both in Queens. Two big Irish communities are Marine Park and neighboring Gerritsen Beach. Another large Irish community can be found on the North Shore of Staten Island in the West Brighton area.

Woodside and Sunnyside in Queens still maintain a large Irish community, and Western Queens still receives many immigrants from Ireland annually. Many Irish bars and restaurants are found along Roosevelt Avenue and Queens Boulevard, and the Emerald Isle Immigration Center in Woodside offers a variety of support services to recent arrivals. Once home to Celtic Park, a historic Gaelic Football and Hurling pitch, Western Queens is still home to a thriving GAA community. Nearby Maspeth also has a strong Irish community, with a mural celebrating the important role Queens residents played in funding and arming the Easter Rebellion in 1916.

The annual New York City St. Patrick's Day Parade draws over 150,000 participants and 2,000,000 spectators.

=== Italian ===
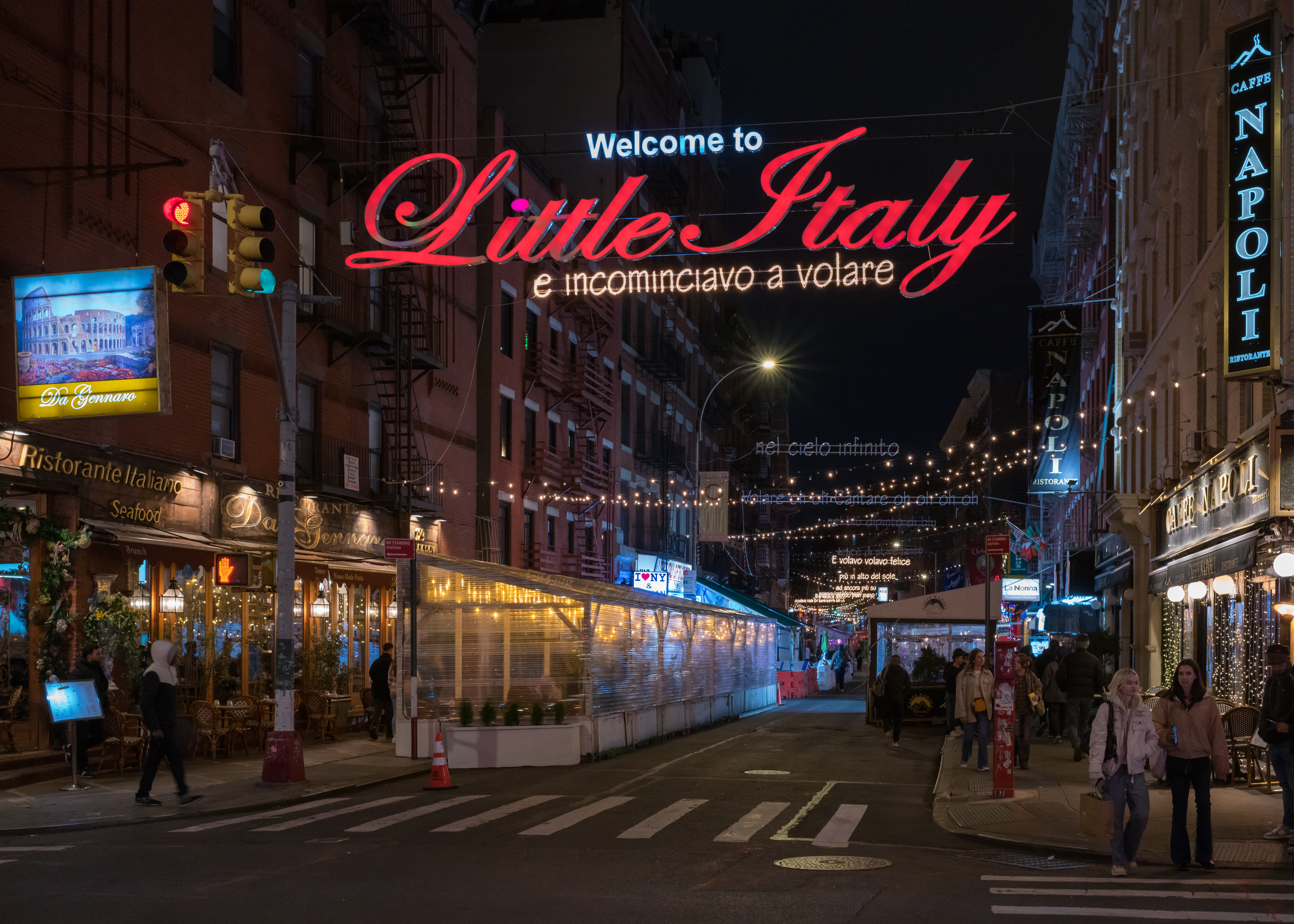
Mulberry Street, Little Italy at night, in 2023.

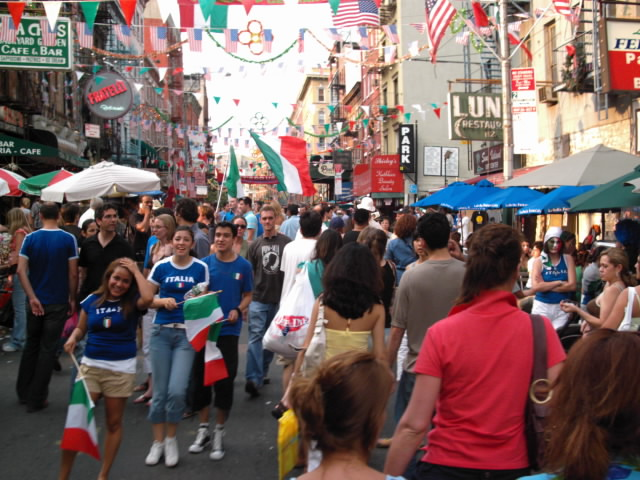
People in Little Italy celebrating after the Italian football team won the 2006 FIFA World Cup.

At 8.3% of the population, Italian Americans compose the largest European American ethnic group in New York City, and are the largest ethnic group in Staten Island (Richmond County), making it the most Italian county in the United States, with 37.7% of the population reporting Italian American ancestry.

Though Italian immigration began as early as the 17th century, with Pietro Cesare Alberti, from Venice, being the first reported Italian living in the New Amsterdam colony, effective immigration started around 1860 with the founding of the Kingdom of Italy. Italian immigration skyrocketed, and lasted that way until 1921, when Congress passed the Emergency Quota Act that slowed the immigration of Italians. Most of the Italian immigrants to New York were from Southern Italy, from Sicily, or cities like Naples.

At one time, Little Italy in Manhattan had over 40,000 Italians and covered seventeen blocks. In fact, much of the Lower East Side in general and, until recently, Greenwich Village contained a high Italian population. Increasing rent prices caused by gentrification, as well as the passing of older generations, has resulted in the decrease in the Italian population in Little Italy. Little Italy is now concentrated around Mulberry Street between Kenmare and Grand streets, with about 5,000 Italian Americans. Italian Harlem, which was once home to over 100,000 Italian-Americans, has also largely disappeared since the 1970s, with the exception of Pleasant Avenue. East New York, Flatbush, Brooklyn, and Brownsville, Brooklyn also had sizable Italian communities that gradually shrank by the 1970s, though pockets of the older Italian-American communities still exist in these neighborhoods.

Another wave of immigration occurred after World War II, with an estimated 129,000 to 150,000 Italian immigrants entering New York City between 1945 and 1973. They settled in Italian American neighborhoods in the outer boroughs and helped reinvigorate Italian culture and community institutions. With the influx of postwar immigrants, Bensonhurst became the largest Italian community in New York City, with 150,000 Italian Americans in the 1980 census. In Dyker Heights, 13th Avenue is home to a significant Italian and Italian-American upper middle class to upper class population and is zoned mostly for low-density residential townhouses, with shops on the first floors of some buildings. It is a two-way street with one lane in each direction, and ends at Dyker Beach Park and Golf Course at 86th Street.

Today, Italian neighborhoods with large Italian-American populations include Morris Park, Bronx; Fordham, Bronx, around Arthur Avenue; Country Club, Bronx; Pelham Bay, Bronx; Little Italy, Bronx, Bay Ridge, Brooklyn; Bensonhurst, Brooklyn; Williamsburg, Brooklyn and East Williamsburg; Dyker Heights, Brooklyn, the city's largest Italian neighborhood (as of 2009); Cobble Hill, Brooklyn and Carroll Gardens, Brooklyn; Canarsie, Brooklyn; Astoria, Howard Beach, Middle Village, Whitestone and Ozone Park; and much of Staten Island.

=== Latvian ===
There is a Latvian community in New York City.

=== Lithuanian ===
Most Lithuanians live in Brooklyn and Queens.

=== Maltese ===
New York City, historically the second-largest US hub for the Maltese diaspora after Detroit, saw major immigration waves following both World Wars due to economic shifts. Centred in Astoria, Queens, affectionately known as "Little Malta", the community retains its cultural footprint today through the active Maltese Center and local traditional bakeries. While strict census data counts just over 2,000 direct self-identifiers in the city today, generational estimates suggest up to 25,000 New Yorkers share Maltese heritage.

=== Nordic ===
Lapskaus Boulevard in Bay Ridge, Brooklyn is a Norwegian enclave. The area is home to about 60,000 Norwegians. In addition, Bay Ridge is also home to many Swedish and Danish immigrants. Other enclaves with notable Scandinavian populations include Sunset Park and Dyker Heights, Brooklyn. The Northeast area of the Bronx, namely the Throggs Neck and Castle Hill sections, also have sizeable populations. In the Southwestern Bronx, many Swedes live in the Morrisania area. In Manhattan, Scandinavians are scattered throughout the borough.

The Finns have two enclaves in the city. The first is in East Harlem, where they live alongside Latin Americans, Irish, Italians, Germans and Jews. Many Finnish businesses can be found along 125th Street, between Fifth Avenue and the Harlem River. Due to social mobility, many Finns relocated to Sunset Park. This enclave contains the largest number of Finns in New York. The Finns were responsible for building many cooperative housing structures in the area. These would also be the first Co-Op buildings built in the United States. In 1991, 40th street was co named as "Finlandia Street. This was to honor the thousands of Finnish immigrants that call Brooklyn home.

There is a "Sweden Day", a midsummer celebration honoring Swedish American heritage and history. Since 1941, it has been held annually at Manhem Club, located in the Throggs Neck area of the Bronx. There are many smaller celebrations held in other boroughs, as well as New Jersey.

Nordic heritage is still apparent in the Bay Ridge neighborhood. There is an annual Syttende Mai Parade, celebrated in honor of Norwegian Constitution Day. The parade features hundreds of people in folk dress who march along Fifth Avenue. The parade ends with the crowning of Miss Norway near the statue of Leif Ericson. The monument was donated in 1939 by Crown Prince Olav, and features a replica of a Viking rune stone located in Tune, Norway. The stone stands on Leif Ericson Square just east of Fourth Avenue.

=== Polish ===
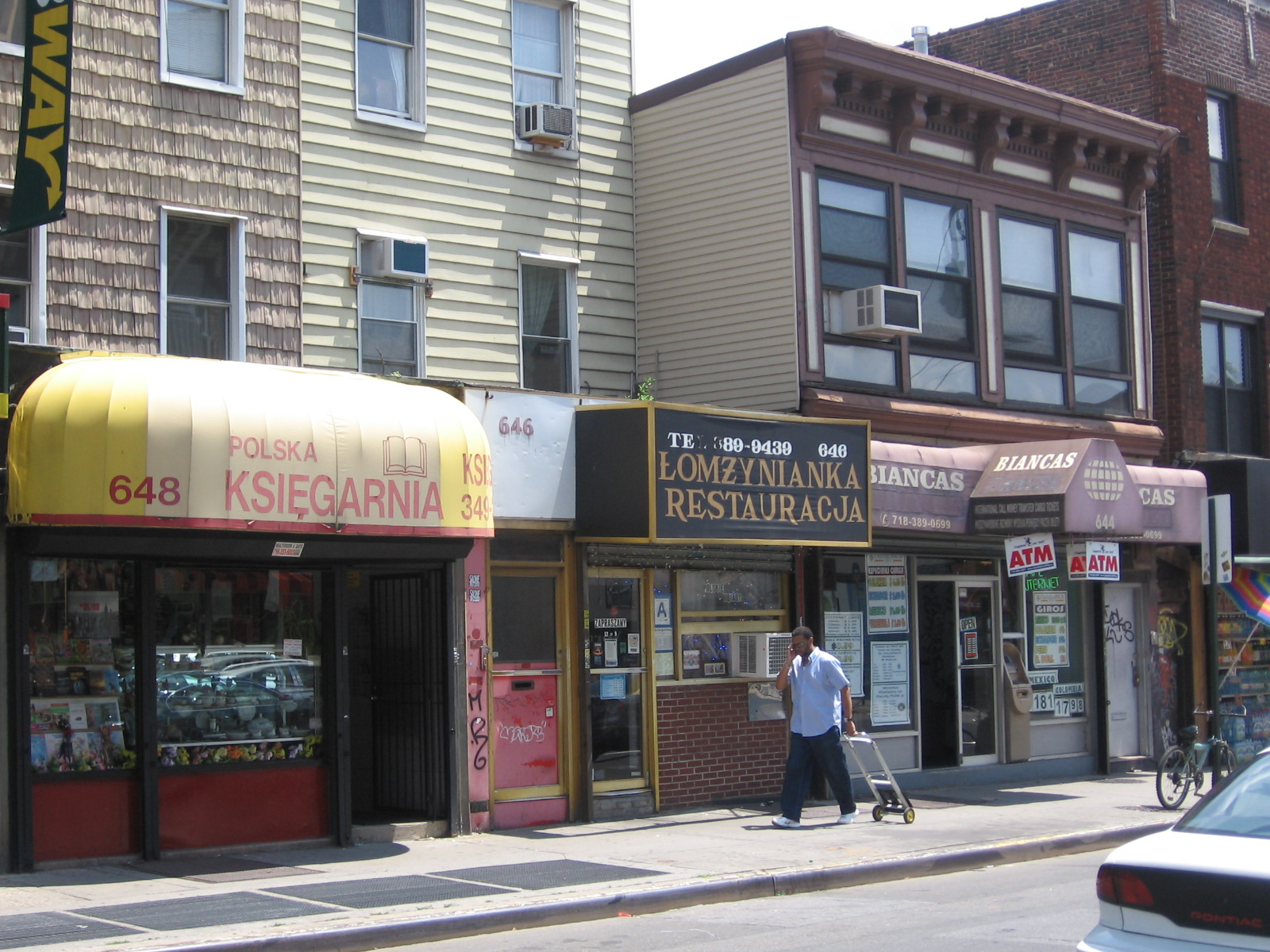
Polish businesses in Greenpoint.

Polish American communities in New York include Greenpoint ("Little Poland") and North Williamsburg in Brooklyn, Maspeth, the East Village near 7th Street, and Ridgewood, Queens around both Fresh Pond Road and Forest Avenue, in Queens.

Polish immigration to New York City began at the end of the 19th century. In the 1980s, as a result of the Polish government's crackdown on the burgeoning Solidarność labor and political movement, Polish migration to the U.S. swelled. Polish Americans and Polish immigrants in the city generally reside in Brooklyn (neighborhoods of Greenpoint and Williamsburg) and in Queens (neighborhoods of Maspeth and Ridgewood). The combined neighborhood of Greenpoint/Williamsburg is sometimes referred to as "Little Poland" because of its large population of primarily working-class Polish immigrants, reportedly the second largest concentration in the United States, after Chicago. As of the 2000 census, 213,447 New Yorkers reported Polish ancestry.

New York is home to a number of Polish and Polish-American cultural, community, and scientific institutions, including the Polish Institute of Arts and Sciences of America (PIASA) and the Polish Cultural Institute. Polish-language publications with circulation reaching outside the city include The Polish Review, an English-language scholarly journal published since 1956 by PIASA; Nowy Dziennik, founded in 1971; and Polska Gazeta, founded in the year 2000. The Polska Gazeta is the leading Polish-language daily newspaper in the tri-state area, delivering daily news to over 17,000 readers in New York, New Jersey, Connecticut, Pennsylvania, Long Island and Delaware. The Polish Newspaper SuperExpress , covering New York, New Jersey & Connecticut started publication in 1996.

The Pulaski Day Parade in New York on Fifth Avenue has been celebrated since 1937 to commemorate Kazimierz Pułaski, a Polish hero of the American Revolutionary War. It closely coincides with the October 11 General Pulaski Memorial Day, a national observance of his death at the Siege of Savannah, and his held on the first Sunday of October. In these parades march Polish dancers, Polish soccer teams and their mascots, Polish Scouts - ZHP and Polish school ambassadors and representatives, such as Mikolaj Pastorino (Nicholas Pastorino) and Lech Wałęsa. The Pulaski Day Parade is one of the largest parades in New York City.

=== Romanians ===
Romanians are concentrated in Queens.

=== Russian ===
Brooklyn has several Russian American communities, including Bay Ridge, Gravesend, Sheepshead Bay, and Midwood. Staten Island's Russian American communities are in South Beach, and New Dorp. The largest Russian-speaking community in the United States is Brighton Beach. Many Russians in New York are Jews from the former Soviet Union, which broke up in 1991, and most still retain at least part of their Russian culture. The primary language of Brighton Beach is Russian, as seen from businesses, clubs, and advertisements. A significant portion of the community is not proficient in English, and about 98% speak Russian as their native language.

=== Serbian ===
The strength of the Serbian community in New York is estimated at 40,000, with the largest concentrations in Ridgewood and Astoria. Whereas the Serbian Orthodox Cathedral of St. Sava on 26th Street in Manhattan provides a historical link to the first Serbian immigrants, these days Serbs are concentrated in Queens, mainly in Ridgewood, Glendale, and Astoria, although the Serbian Club is located on 65th Place in Glendale.

=== Spanish ===
Little Spain was a Spanish-American neighborhood in Manhattan during the 20th century. It was on 14th Street, between Seventh and Eighth Avenues.

=== Ukrainian ===
There is a small Ukrainian American community in the East Village, centered on Second Avenue between 6th and 10th Streets. The community was there when the East Village was still referred to as the Lower East Side, and was a moderately large community. Though it has since declined, the number of Ukrainians in the neighborhood may have been as high as 60,000 after World War II.

== Latin American ==
Many ethnic enclaves in New York City are Latin American or South American–centric. Ethnic groups from Latin and South America with enclaves in New York include Argentinians, Colombians, Dominicans, Peruvians, Salvadorans, Ecuadorians, Guatemalans, Mexicans, and Puerto Ricans. More than half of the population of Jackson Heights, Queens, are immigrants, primarily South Asians, South Americans, and Latin Americans (including Argentinians, Colombians, and Uruguayans).

=== Brazilian ===
Most Brazilian Americans in New York can be found in two areas—in Astoria, Queens, and Jackson Heights, Queens. But there was a Brazilian enclave on a section of West 46th Street between Fifth Avenue and Sixth Avenue in Midtown Manhattan. In Astoria, the area around 36th Avenue and 30th Street is the most Brazilian in character, despite the prevalence of other ethnic groups, like Bengali, Greek, Italian, Mexican, Arab, Japanese, Korean, Indian, Dominican, and Pakistani people. The top three languages in Astoria are Spanish, Greek, and Brazilians' native Portuguese. The former Brazilian neighborhood, 46th Street between Fifth and Sixth Avenues, was officially named "Little Brazil", but resident Brazilians called it "Rua 46." It was dissolved in the 1990s due to gentrification.

=== Colombian ===
Colombians have come in small numbers to New York City since the 1950s. The major exodus of Colombians from Colombia came in the 1970s and early 1980s when many of Colombia's cities were facing hardships from drug traffickers, crime and lack of employment. 55% of Colombians in New York City live in Queens, specifically in Jackson Heights, Corona, Elmhurst and Murray Hill. In 2019, it was and estimated that 505,493 Colombians lived in New York City, representing 5.6% of the total population.

=== Dominican ===
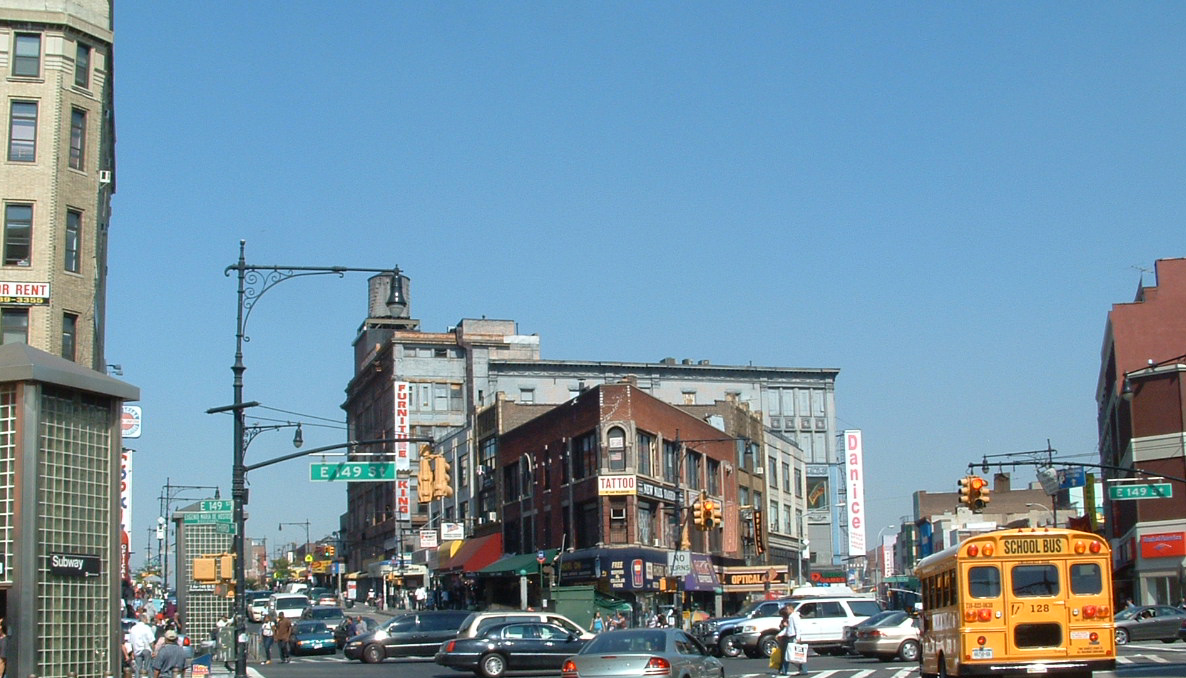
The Hub is the retail heart of the South Bronx, a Hispanic neighborhood with a large Dominican population.

Immigration records of Dominicans in the United States date from the late 19th century, with New York City having a Dominican community since the 1930s. Large scale immigration of Dominicans began after 1961 onward when dictator Rafael Trujillo died. Other catalysts in Dominican immigration were the invasion of Santo Domingo in 1965, and the regime of Joaquín Balaguer from 1966 to 1978. In part due to these catalysts, starting in the 1970s and lasting until the early 1990s, Dominicans were the largest group of immigrants coming into New York City. Now, Dominicans compose 7% of New York's population and are the largest immigrant group. Major Dominican neighborhoods in New York include Washington Heights and Inwood, East Harlem in Manhattan, Bushwick, Southside Williamsburg, Sunset Park, and East New York in Brooklyn, Corona, Jackson Heights, Ridgewood, and Woodhaven in Queens, and most of the West Bronx, particularly areas like the Highbridge, University Heights, Morris Heights, Kingsbridge, and Fordham-Bedford, among others. In fact, Dominicans are the most dominant Hispanic group (and overall ethnic group) in many areas of the Bronx west of Third Avenue, often sharing these Bronx neighborhoods with Puerto Ricans, African Americans, as well as whites and other immigrants from Latin America and Africa. Upper Manhattan and western portions of the Bronx have some of the highest concentrations of Dominicans in the country.

The South Bronx is another neighborhood with a Dominican population. During the 1970s, the area, while heavily populated by Puerto Ricans & African Americans, became infamous for poverty and arson, a lot by landlords seeking insurance money on "coffin ships" of buildings. By 1975, the South Bronx was the most devastated urban landscape in America, and had experienced the largest population drop in urban history, given the exception of the aftermath of war. The South Bronx has started to recover, and most of it has recovered from the damage done in the 1970s.

By 1984, the traditionally heavily Italian neighborhood of Corona had instead become heavily Dominican, and Corona experienced rapid economic growth – 59% – as compared to the rest of the city experiencing 7%, as well as having the most overcrowded school district in the city as of 2006.

The Dominican population of Washington Heights is significant, and candidates for political office in the Dominican Republic will run parades up Broadway.

In some of these neighborhoods, shops advertise in Spanish and English, the Dominican flag is hung from windows, storefronts, and balconies, and the primary language is Dominican Spanish.

=== Ecuadorian ===
New York City has a large Ecuadorian American ethnic enclaves, and there are over 210,000 Ecuadorians in the city as of 2013, making them the sixth largest ethnic population in the city. A part of Southside Williamsburg in Brooklyn is Ecuadorian in nature, with Spanish being the primary language of most Ecuadorians in the area, bodegas advertising goods in Spanish, and churches advertising bingo games in Spanish.

Other Ecuadorian neighborhoods include Tremont in the Bronx, and several neighborhoods in Queens, including Jackson Heights, Corona, and Ridgewood, have significant Ecuadorian communities. Corona's Ecuadorian community, notably, is the fastest-growing, with parts of Corona being over 25% Ecuadorian.

=== Guatemalan ===
There is a good fitted Guatemalan American population in the Queens area. Others may be found in Brooklyn.

=== Honduran ===
There is a sizable Honduran American population in the South and West Bronx. Others are in Brownsville, Williamsburg, Bushwick, East New York in Brooklyn, Harlem, East Harlem in Manhattan, and Jamaica in Queens.

=== Mexican ===
Mexican Americans, as of 2004, were New York's fastest growing ethnic group, with 186,000 immigrants as of 2013; they were also the third largest Hispanic group in New York City, after Puerto Ricans and Dominicans. Close to 80% of New York Mexicans were born outside the United States, and more than 60% of Mexican New Yorkers reside in Brooklyn and Queens.

In Brooklyn, Sunset Park and Flatbush have the highest concentration of Mexicans, and Bushwick and Brighton Beach also have significant Mexican populations. In Queens, Elmhurst, East Elmhurst, and Jackson Heights have the largest Mexican populations, but Corona and Kew Gardens also have sizable communities. Spanish Harlem in Manhattan, around 116th Street and Second Avenue, has a large community of Mexicans, which is still small compared to the area's predominant Puerto Rican population; Staten Island has a large Mexican community in the Port Richmond, West Brighton, and Tompkinsville areas.

The densest population of Mexicans in the city is in Sunset Park, Brooklyn, in an area bounded by Second and Fifth Avenues and by 35th and 63rd Streets. This area is centered around a Fifth Avenue commercial strip. The main church is Basilica of Our Lady of Perpetual Help, with over 3,000 Mexican Catholic parishioners.

Compared to Mexican immigrants in other states and cities, Mexicans in New York are primarily of indigenous descent, with almost 20% still speaking indigenous languages. New York holds 61% of indigenous-speaking immigrants from Mexico.

=== Puerto Rican ===
Puerto Ricans have been immigrating to New York since 1838, though they did not arrive in large numbers until the 20th century. In 1910 only 500 Puerto Ricans lived in New York but by 1970 that number had skyrocketed to over 800,000. 40% of those lived in the Bronx. The first group of Puerto Ricans immigrated to New York City in the mid-19th century when Puerto Rico was a Spanish colony. Its people were Spanish subjects and as such were immigrants. The following wave of Puerto Ricans to move to New York City did so after the Spanish–American War in 1898. Puerto Ricans were no longer Spanish subjects and citizens of Spain, they were now Puerto Rican citizens of an American possession and needed passports to travel to the mainland of the United States. That was until 1917, when the United States Congress approved Jones-Shafroth Act which gave Puerto Ricans in the island a U.S. citizenship with certain limitations. Puerto Ricans living in the mainland U.S. however, were given full American citizenship and were allowed to seek political office in the states which they resided. Two months later, when Congress passed the Selective Service Act, conscription was extended to the Puerto Ricans both in the island and in the U.S. mainland. It was expected that Puerto Rican men 18 years and older serve in the military during World War I. The Jones-Shafroth Act also allowed Puerto Ricans to travel between Puerto Rico and the United States mainland without the need of a passport, thereby becoming migrants. The advent of air travel was one of the principal factors that led to the largest wave of migration of Puerto Ricans to New York City in the 1950s, known as "The Great Migration". Although Florida has received some dispersal of the population, there has been a resurgence in Puerto Rican migration to New York and New Jersey - consequently, the New York City Metropolitan Area has witnessed an increase in its Puerto Rican population from 1,177,430 in 2010 to a Census-estimated 1,201,850 in 2012, maintaining its status by a significant margin as the most important cultural and demographic center for Puerto Ricans outside San Juan.

Brooklyn has several neighborhoods with a Puerto Rican presence, many of the ethnic Puerto Rican neighborhoods in Brooklyn formed before the Puerto Rican neighborhoods in the South Bronx because of the work demand in the Brooklyn Navy Yard in the 1940s and 50s. Bushwick has the highest concentration of Puerto Ricans in Brooklyn. Other neighborhoods with significant populations include Williamsburg, East New York, Brownsville, Coney Island, Red Hook, Sunset Park, and Bay Ridge. In Williamsburg; Graham Avenue is nicknamed "Avenue of Puerto Rico" because of the high density and strong ethnic enclave of Puerto Ricans who have been living in the neighborhood since the 1950s. The Puerto Rican day parade is also hosted on the avenue.

Ridgewood, Queens, also has a significant Puerto Rican population, which is now spreading to other places in Central Queens such as Maspeth, Glendale, and Middle Village; as does neighboring community Bushwick, Brooklyn. Other neighborhoods in Queens such as Woodhaven also have a sizable population.

Puerto Rican neighborhoods in Manhattan include Spanish Harlem and Loisaida. Spanish Harlem was "Italian Harlem" from the 1880s until the 1940s. By 1940, however, the name "Spanish Harlem" was becoming widespread, and by 1950, the area was predominantly Puerto Rican and African American. Loisaida is an enclave east of Avenue A that originally comprised German, Jewish, Irish, and Italian working class residents who lived in tenements without running water; the German presence, already in decline, virtually ended after the General Slocum disaster in 1904. Since them, the community has become Puerto Rican and Latino in character, despite the "gentrification" that has affected the East Village and the Lower East Side since the late 20th century.

Staten Island has a fairly large Puerto Rican population along the North Shore, especially in the Mariners' Harbor, Arlington, Elm Park, Graniteville, Port Richmond & Stapleton neighborhoods, where the population is in the 20% range.

Unlike the other four boroughs, Puerto Rican populations are significant throughout the Bronx, though there is slightly higher concentrations in the South Bronx. Bronx neighborhoods with the highest concentrations of Puerto Ricans in the borough, and some of the highest in the city overall, mainly consist of low-income areas with high overall Hispanic percentages, especially in the southwest (South Bronx) and south central sections of the Bronx, because these are areas Puerto Ricans first started moving to when Puerto Rican migration to the Bronx started in the 1960s, due to proximity to Spanish Harlem, areas like Mott Haven, Melrose, Longwood, and Soundview. Puerto Ricans are scattered in sizeable numbers throughout the Bronx, and better-off Puerto Ricans can be seen in more middle-class neighborhoods like Throggs Neck and Riverdale for example. Nearly 40% of NYC Puerto Ricans live in the Bronx.

In New York and many other cities, Puerto Ricans usually live in close proximity with Dominicans and African Americans. High concentrations of Puerto Ricans are also present in numerous public housing developments throughout the city.

In some places in the South Bronx, Spanish is the primary language. Throughout the 1970s, the South Bronx became known as the epitome of urban decay, but has since made a recovery.

=== Salvadoran ===
New York City also has some Salvadoran American ethnic enclaves such as the one in Flushing; others are in Corona, Jamaica, Williamsburg, and Parkchester.

== Middle Eastern and North African ==
=== Arab and Maghrebi ===
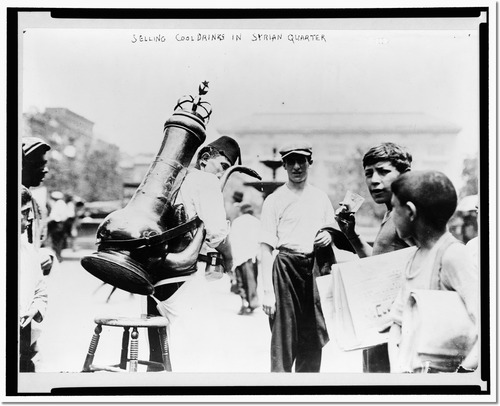
A Syrian man selling cold drinks in Lower Manhattan, circa 1908

Arab people had been in the US since before the war of independence in 1776; during the first major wave of immigration after independence, many came to New York City in the 1880s, the majority from modern-day Lebanon and Syria. Before the advent of modern Lebanon in August 1920, and due to the political and historical nature of Ottoman-ruled Syria, the majority of Lebanese and Syrians referred to themselves as "Syrian" upon arrival to Ellis Island. Little by little, starting in the 1930s, immigrants from Lebanon started referring to themselves as "Lebanese-American" and immigrants from Syria retained the designation "Syrian-American". From 1880 to 1960 the overwhelming majority (90%) of Lebanese and Syrian immigrants were of the Christian faith. After 1960, especially after the Immigration and Nationality Act of 1965, Arab Muslims from other Arab countries such as Jordan, and Egypt started arriving in New York. The largest Syrian/Lebanese neighborhood was located around Washington Street in Lower Manhattan, in a neighborhood called Little Syria. Syrian immigration to the United States was very small with respect to the other ethnic groups or peoples that arrived in America. In 1910, at the peak of Syrian immigration, only 60,000 Syrians entered the United States.

Around the late-1930s, Little Syria started to go into decline with the construction of skyscrapers in Lower Manhattan. In the name of urban renewal, the skyscraper era was ushered in and preceded with the destruction of five-storey tenements that Syrians called home. The final blow to Little Syria commenced with the construction of the Brooklyn battery tunnel in 1940. A large percentage of the community moved to the area around downtown Brooklyn; and set up shops and businesses on Atlantic Avenue. St. George's Syrian Catholic Church is the last physical reminder of the Syrian- and Lebanese-American community that once lived in Little Syria. In Brooklyn, there are two long-time established businesses still open on Atlantic Avenue. Damascus Bakery is still in business since 1936, and Sahadi's has had a strong loyal customer base since 1948. By the 1960s, the community was to move yet again, this time to Park Slope and East Williamsburg.

The New York metro area contains the largest concentration of populations with Arab and Middle Eastern ancestry in the United States, with 230,899 residents of the metro area claiming Arab ancestry in the 2000 U.S. Census. An estimated 70,000 lived in New York City as of 2000. New York City holds the New York Arab-American Comedy Festival, founded in 2003 by comedians Dean Obeidallah and Maysoon Zayid. There is also a Berber community present in New York.

==== Bronx ====
Located on White Plains Road in Morris Park the area has been recently named Little Yemen due to the growing number of Yemeni Americans. The area contains several Hookah cafes, a Yemeni supermarket, and Yemeni delis and pharmacies that surround the intersection.

==== Queens ====
Astoria, Queens, has an Egyptian American community, dubbed "Little Egypt", centered on Steinway Street between Broadway and Astoria Boulevard. It features many Middle Eastern and North African cafés, restaurants, and shops, including other businesses from countries like Algeria, Lebanon, and Syria.

==== Brooklyn ====
On Atlantic Avenue between the East River and Flatbush Avenue, there is also a significant population of Middle Easterners. There are a few shops which still exist in this street, such as Sahadi's. A little part of this community remained in the neighborhoods Boerum Hill and Park Slope. There is also a significant Middle Eastern population in Midwood, Brooklyn and East Williamsburg.

Other boroughs: Staten Island has a Palestinian community, found in the New Springville area, and a small Coptic Egyptian community in the South Shore of Staten Island. There are a lot of Arab restaurants in Manhattan.

South Williamsburg is an ethnic enclave centered on Israeli Americans. There is also a small community of Israelis centered on Kings Highway, also in Brooklyn. Israelis first immigrated to the United States after 1948. United Kingdom, and the United States has experienced two large waves of immigration from Israel. The first was during the 1950s and early 1960s, 300,000 Israelis immigrated to the United States, and another wave, starting in the mid-1970s and lasting through the present, in which 100,000 to 500,000 Israelis have immigrated to the United States.

=== Iranians ===
The main concentration of Iranian Americans of Persian descent is in Queens, along with the large Armenian population. There is a large Iranian Jewish population in Great Neck, on Long Island.

== Others ==
=== Armenian ===
The main concentration of Armenians including Armenian Americans is in Queens, an estimated 50,000 people of the city's over 100,000 Armenians. After the massacres in the Ottoman Empire in the late 19th Century and the Armenian Genocide, Armenian immigrants found a home in New York, especially in today's Murray Hill area which was known as "Little Armenia." St. Vartan Armenian Cathedral and St. Vartan Park are remnants of the old Armenian neighborhood. That population eventually shrank as many Armenians moved west to areas like Los Angeles.

=== Australian ===
Since 2010, the world's largest Little Australia has emerged and is growing in the southern and western parts of Chinatown, Manhattan, New York City. Mulberry Street and Mott Street in Lower Manhattan are commonly referred to by Australian expats as "Little Australia" due to the influence of Australian and New Zealand cafe culture in the neighborhood, which includes establishments such as Ruby's, Two Hands, Bluestone Lane, Bowery Cafe, Cafe Grumpy, Egg Shop, Musket Room and Happy Bones. Little Australia is adjacent to Little Italy and Chinatown in Manhattan.

In 2011, there were an estimated 20,000 Australian residents of New York City, nearly quadrupling the 5,537 in 2005.

=== Jewish ===
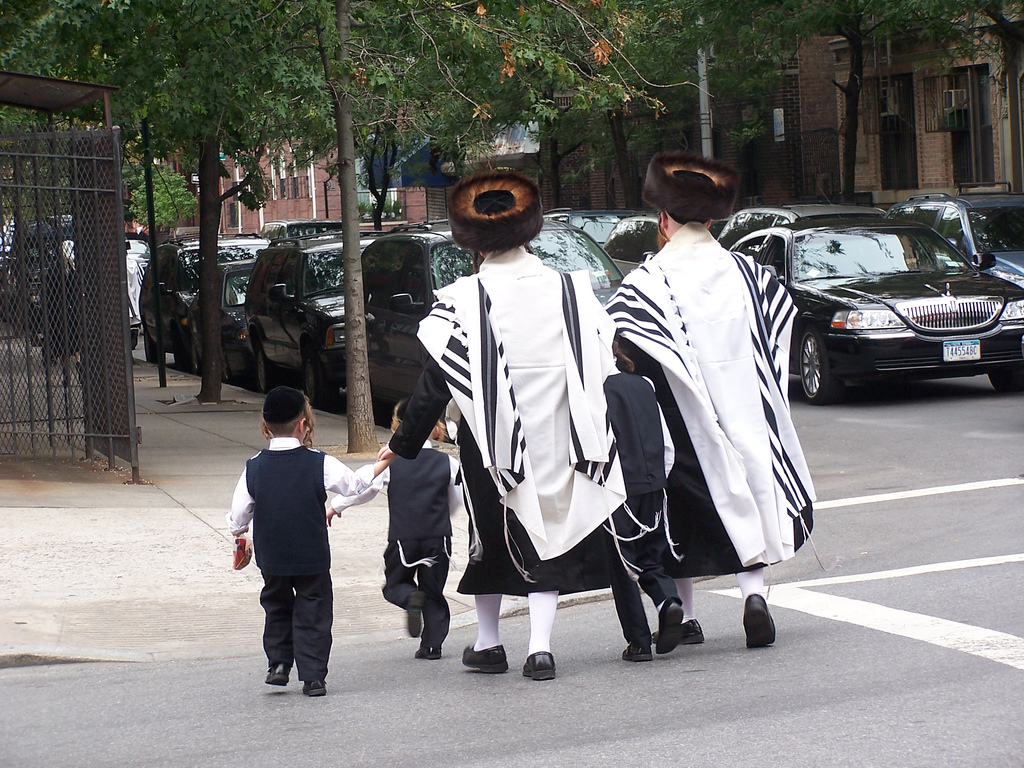
Brooklyn's Jewish community is the largest in the United States, with approximately 561,000 individuals.

The first Jewish presence in New York City dates to the arrival of 23 Jewish refugees in 1654, when it was still New Amsterdam, from Recife (Brazil) following the First Anglo-Dutch War, resulting a decade later in the first known civil rights case in the New World when a Jew named Asser Levy successfully appealed to the New Amsterdam colonial council for the right to serve in the army. Later German immigration brought large communities of Jews to the city. Starting then until 1820 was the first wave of Jewish immigration to America, bringing fewer than 15,000 Jews. The first wave of Jewish people were fleeing religious persecution in Brazil, Portugal, Spain, Bordeaux, Jamaica, England, Curaçao, Holland, and conquered by Russian Empire former Poland (Rzeczpospolita Obojga Narodów), and founded communities in New York, Newport, Charleston, Savannah, and Philadelphia. From 1820 to 1880 came the second wave, in which a quarter million German Jews migrated to America. A third major wave of Sephardi Jews coming from the Balkans and the Middle East after the Turkish revolution. The outbreak of World War I and the Holocaust caused many German Jews to immigrate to the United States. During this period, 1881 to 1924, over 2,000,000 Eastern European Jews immigrated, fleeing anti-semitic persecution in their home countries. A later wave from Eastern Europe, from 1985 to 1990, over 140,000 Jews immigrated from the former Soviet Union. 50,000 Jews a year still immigrate to the United States.

New York today has the second largest number of Jews in a metropolitan area, behind Gush Dan (the Tel Aviv Metropolitan Area) in Israel. Borough Park, Brooklyn, (also known as Boro Park) is one of the largest Orthodox Jewish communities in the world. Crown Heights, Brooklyn, also has a large Orthodox Jewish community. Flatbush, Brooklyn, Riverdale, Bronx, Williamsburg, Brooklyn, Midwood, Brooklyn, Forest Hills, Queens, Kew Gardens Hills, Queens, Kew Gardens, Queens, Fresh Meadows, Queens and the Upper East Side, Washington Heights, Manhattan because of the proximity of the renowned Yeshiva U and Upper West Side, Manhattan, are also home to Jewish communities. Another neighborhood, the Lower East Side, though presently known as a mixing pot for people of many nationalities, including German, Puerto Rican, Italian, and Chinese, was primarily a Jewish neighborhood. Although the Jewish community of Staten Island is dispersed throughout the Island, enclaves of Hasidic Jews are found in the Willowbrook, New Springville, Eltingville, and New Brighton areas.

The New York metropolitan area is home to the largest Jewish population in the world outside Israel. While most are descendants of Jews who moved from Europe, a growing number are of Asian and Middle Eastern origin. After dropping from a peak of 2.5 million in the 1950s to a low of 1.4 million in 2002 the population of Jews in the New York metropolitan area grew to 1.54 million in 2011. A study by the UJA-Federation of New York released in 2012 showed that the proportion of liberal Jews was decreasing while the proportion of generally conservative Orthodox Jews and recent immigrants from Russia was increasing. Much of this growth is in Brooklyn, which in 2012 was 23% Jewish and where most of the Russian immigrants live and nearly all of the ultra-orthodox. The study by UJA-Federation of New York has been criticized by J.J. Goldberg, an observer at The Jewish Daily Forward, as excluding suburban Jews, for example in New Jersey, that are outside the service area of UJA-Federation of New York and also for lack of granularity with respect to the Orthodox of New York City.

=== Romani ===
Muslim Romani people from southern Yugoslavia settled in the Bronx. An increase in attacks on Romani people in eastern Europe brought growing numbers of Romani refugees to New York City during the 1990s. Roma in Greater New York are mainly descended from liberated slaves and are known as the Vlax Roma, during the first four decades of the twentieth century. The majority of Vlax Roma in Manhattan belonged to the Kalderash subgroup. The Machvaya who came from Serbia settled in Brooklyn but they moved after World War II to Manhattan in increasing numbers. The Lovari, from Hungary, settled in Newark, New Jersey.

=== Native Americans ===
180,866 New York City residents indicated that they were of "American Indian or Alaska Native" heritage in the 2020 United States census. This amounts to about 2% of the New York City population.

== See also ==
- Demographics of New York City
- Cuisine of New York City
- Racial and ethnic history of New York City
- District X, a fictional enclave
