= Little Australia =

Australian diaspora communities

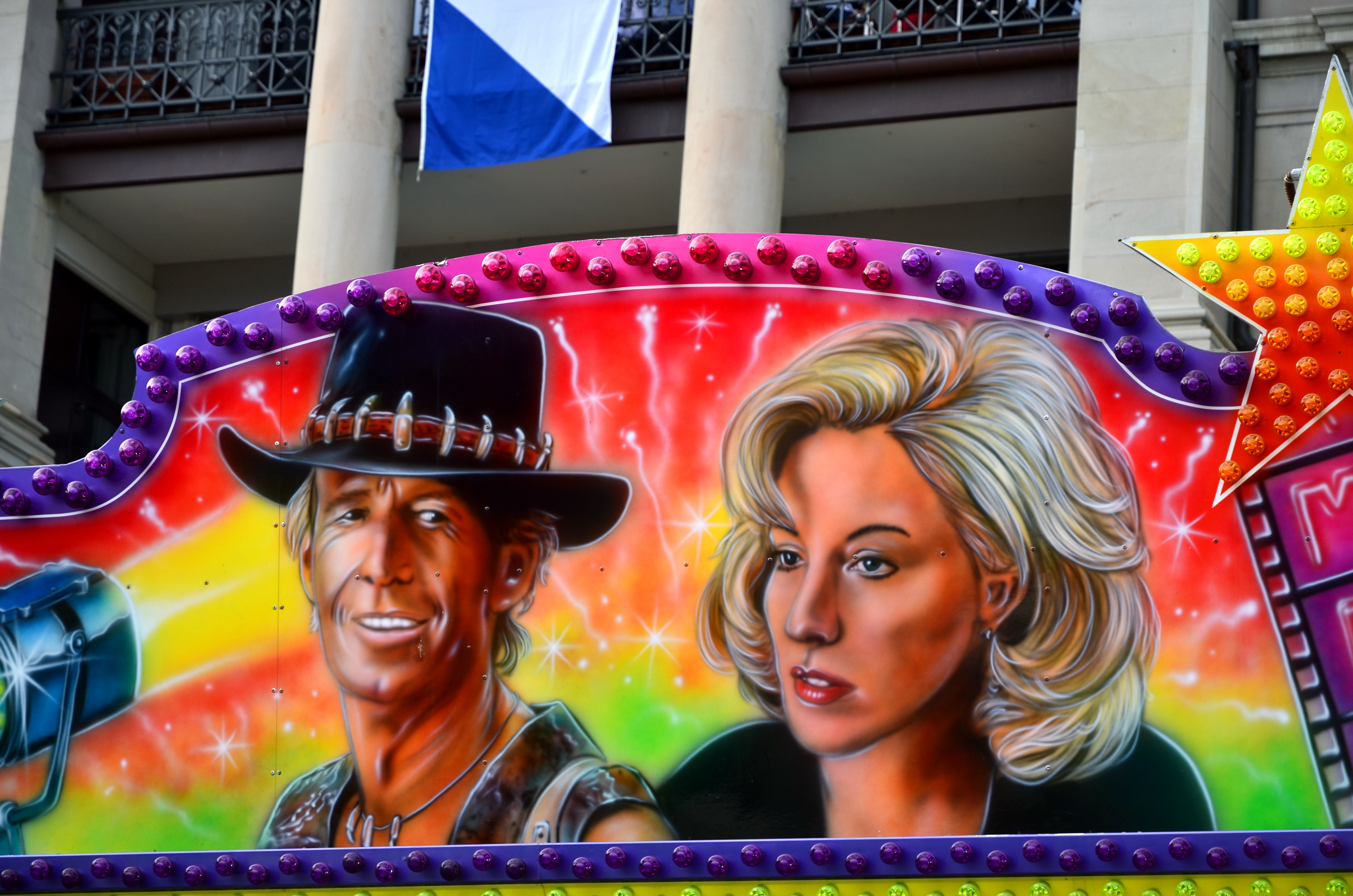
Artistic rendering of Paul Hogan and Linda Kozlowski starring in Crocodile Dundee II, a movie about an Aussie finding his way in New York City

Little Australia is the name of communities of the Australian diaspora in the United States, Canada, Japan, and the United Kingdom. Common features of Australian culture in "Little Australia" include shops selling Australasian goods and restaurants lining the streets. A "Little Australia" strives essentially to have a sample of the culture of Australia transplanted to the midst of a large non-Australian city.

== Mulberry Street and Mott Street, Manhattan ==
Since 2010, the world's largest Little Australia has emerged and is growing in Nolita, Manhattan, New York City. Mulberry Street and Mott Street in Lower Manhattan are commonly referred to by Australian expats as "Little Australia" due to the influence of Australian and New Zealand cafe culture in the neighborhood, which includes establishments such as Ruby's, Two Hands, Bluestone Lane, Bowery Cafe, Cafe Grumpy, Egg Shop, Musket Room and Happy Bones. Little Australia is adjacent to Little Italy and Chinatown in Manhattan.

In 2011, there were an estimated 20,000 Australian residents of New York City, nearly quadrupling the 5,537 in 2005.

== Earl's Court, London ==
Earl's Court in London had the nickname "Kangaroo Valley" or "Roo Valley", although many Australian visitors now go to cheaper districts to the north or west.

When Barry Humphries went (by sea) to London in 1959, he and then wife Rosalind lived in Ladbroke Grove in Kensington. He made an impromptu visit to "an Earl's Court pub, in the middle of Kangaroo Valley, as it was sometimes called. He fell physically ill and frightened by what he saw. The packs of loutish Australian youths swilling beer and swearing revived painful memories of the bullies at Melbourne Grammar." This theme re-emerged more affectionately from 1964 in Humphries' Barry McKenzie series; the character lived in an Earl's Court flat.

In 1962, Clive James went (also by sea; only one friend could afford to fly) to London with a week's accommodation booked in Earl's Court, which "in those days was still nicknamed 'Kangaroo Valley'". He said that there was no mistaking the Earl's Court Australians, with "jug ears, short haircuts ... and open, freckled, eyeless faces" despite their "navy-blue English duffle-coats; though they had not yet taken to carrying twelve-packs of Foster's Lager, and the broad-brimmed Akubra hat with corks dangling from the brim was never to be more than a myth". After he moved, he "vowed never to enter Earl's Court again".

== Whistler, British Columbia ==
The town of Whistler, British Columbia holds a congregation of Australians and has been described as a ‘Little Australia’ due to the strong Australian culture and many Australians on working holiday visas present. Australian Alpine skier Jono Brauer coined the term "Whistralia" to refer to the ski village in a 2010 interview, and this has since become a nickname. In 2010, it was estimated that Australians made up 34% of the workforce for Whistler-Blackcomb ski resort. Australian snacks such as meat pies, Tim Tams, and Vegemite are sold at supermarkets in Whistler, and Australia Day is celebrated, with multiple pubs throwing organised party events.

== Niseko, Hokkaido ==
Since the early 2000s, a significant Australian community has emerged in the Niseko area of Hokkaido, which comprises the towns of Kutchan, Niseko, and Rankoshi. Similar to the case of Whistler, this is due to the popularity of the region's ski resorts. In 2020, 33.1% of foreign nationals living in Kutchan were Australians. Many Australian settlers have established tourism-related businesses such as guest houses and restaurants, and holiday homes in the area, and the area has been described as a 'Little Australia'.

== See also ==
- Earls Court Kangaroos
- New Australia
- The Adventures of Barry McKenzie
