= Australian diaspora =

Australian emigrants and their descendants

- Map of the Australian diaspora

Regions with significant populations
- 608,734 (2025)
- United Kingdom: 165,000 (2021)
- Greece: 135,000
- United States: 98,969 (2019)
- New Zealand: 75,696 (2018)
- Italy: 30,000 (2002)
- Singapore: 25,930 (2026)
- Vietnam: 22,000 (2013)
- Canada: 21,115 (2016)
- Thailand: 20,000 (2008)
- United Arab Emirates: 24,000 (2026)
- South Korea: 15,222 (2019)
- Hong Kong: 14,669 (2016); 100,000
- Germany: 13,600 (2020)
- China: 13,286 (2010)
- Turkey: 13,286 (2010)
- Malta: 13,000
- Japan: 12,024 (2019)
- Netherlands: 12,000
- Indonesia: 11,000
- France: 10,000
- Malaysia: 9,500 (2026)
- Spain: 9,000
- Papua New Guinea: 9,000
- Ireland: 8,000
- Switzerland: 7,000
- South Africa: 6,000
- Sweden: 5,000
- Saudi Arabia: 5,000
- Brazil: 4,607 (2025)
- Denmark: 4,000
- India: 3,000 - 4,000
- Philippines: 3,360
- Qatar: 3,100
- Austria: 3,000
- Israel: 3,000
- Cyprus: 3,000
- Belgium: 2,000
- Fiji: 2,000
- Norway: 1,917
- Finland: 1,402
- Portugal: 1,400
- Poland: 1,000
- Hungary: 1,000
- Czech Republic: 1,000
- Serbia: 1,000
- Croatia: 1,000
- Peru: 1,000
- Libya: 1,000
- Brunei: 1,000

The Australian diaspora are those Australians living outside of Australia. It includes approximately 608,734 Australian-born people living outside of Australia, people who are Australian citizens and live outside Australia, and people with Australian ancestry who live outside of Australia.

In 2020, 2.34% of the Australian population lived overseas, which is lower than most OECD countries, except the USA (0.89%) and Japan (0.64%).

== History ==
The diaspora was reported on in a 2003 Committee for Economic Development of Australia (CEDA) research report, "Australia's Diaspora: Its Size, Nature and Policy Implications". The report argued for an Australian government policy of maintaining active contact with the diaspora.

In 2005, Senate Legal and Constitutional References Committee (a standing committee) reported into the issue of Expatriate Australians and made recommendations that the "Australian Government needs to make greater efforts to connect with and engage our expatriate community".

In contrast to many countries which experience a "brain drain" due to emigration, the 2003 CEDA report argued that emigration was a net positive for Australia, with the country seeing "brain circulation" as Australians added to their skills and expertise, and a "brain gain", as these skilled expatriates tended to return to Australia and new skilled immigrants arrive. Between 1999 and 2003, there were seven highly educated migrants to Australia for every one highly educated Australian who was living elsewhere in countries within the Organisation for Economic Co-operation and Development (OECD). Levels of skilled immigration to Australia reflect Government policies to "practise a selective immigration policy based on human capital criteria".

== Countries by Australian diaspora ==
=== United Kingdom ===
In 2021, 165,000 Australian-born people lived in the United Kingdom. The 2011 UK Census recorded 113,592 residents born in Australia in England, 2,695 in Wales, 8,279 in Scotland, and 1,750 in Northern Ireland.

=== United States ===
In 2019, there were 98,619 Australian-born people living in the United States. In 2001, the major places of residence were: 25,000 living in Los Angeles; 17,000 in San Francisco; 17,000 in Washington, D.C.; and 15,000 in New York. As part of deepening commercial relations surrounding the Australia-United States Free Trade Agreement, the United States created the E-3 visa category, a separate skilled worker visa track open exclusively to Australian nationals. E-3 visas are issued for periods of up to two years, and can be renewed indefinitely.

=== New Zealand ===
In 2018, there were 75,696 Australian-born people living in New Zealand. The Trans-Tasman Travel Arrangement enables Australians and New Zealanders to migrate between Australia and New Zealand without complying with usual immigration requirements.

=== Hong Kong ===
In 2016, there were 14,669 Australian-born people living in Hong Kong.

=== China ===
In 2010, there were 13,286 Australian-born people living in Mainland China.

=== Germany ===
In 2021 there were 26,000 Australian-born people living in Germany. In recent years, the number of Australians living abroad in Germany has increased.

== Comparison with the expatriate populations of other countries ==
In 2020, 2.34% of the Australian population lived overseas, which is lower than most OECD countries, except the USA (0.89%) and Japan (0.64%).

Education levels of Australian expatriates were high: 44% of Australian expatriates in other OECD countries had a high level of education. Japanese expatriates had the highest proportion, with 50% having a high level of education. 49% of expatriates from the USA had a high education as did 45% of expatriates from New Zealand.

== See also ==
- Australian rules football around the world
- Little Australia
