= Nick Stone (footballer, born 1981) =

Australian rules footballer

Personal information
- Full name: Nick Stone
- Born: 1 October 1981 (age 45)
- Original team: Prahran Dragons
- Draft: 82nd, 1999 AFL draft to Collingwood; 44th, 2002 Rookie Draft to Hawthorn 22nd, 2004 Rookie Draft to St Kilda
- Height: 196 cm (6 ft 5 in)
- Weight: 97 kg (214 lb)

Playing career^{1}
Years	Club	Games (Goals)
2000–2001	Collingwood	0 (0)
2002–2003	Hawthorn	17 (0)
2004–2005	St Kilda	3 (0)
Total		20 (0)
- ^{1} Playing statistics correct to the end of 2005.

Nick Stone (born 1 October 1981) is a former Australian rules footballer who played with Hawthorn and St Kilda in the Australian Football League (AFL).

Stone, originally from Wesley College, was recruited by Collingwood from the Prahran Dragons late in the 1999 AFL draft. He never played a senior game for Collingwood and in 2001 he was rookie listed by Hawthorn. He only played 17 games for Hawthorn, largely on the bench, over two seasons, before he was again delisted, and again rookie listed, this time by St Kilda with the 2004 Rookie Draft.

He played two games for St Kilda towards the end of the 2004 season, which saw him be elevated to their senior list for 2005, but after only played one game in 2005 he was delisted at the end of the year.

Nick went on to move to New York City in 2010 and work in corporate finance. During that time he founded Bluestone Lane, a chain of Aussie-style coffee shops and cafes. As of 2017 Bluestone Lane had more than 30 locations and are expected to grow even larger.
