= Georgia Davies =

Georgia Davies may refer to:

- Georgia Davies (swimmer)
- Georgia Davies (musician)
