= Café Grumpy =

American coffee roaster and cafe company based in New York City

- Company type: Private
- Industry: Coffee; hospitality
- Founded: 2005
- Founders: Caroline Bell; Chris Timbrell
- Area served: New York City; New Jersey; South Florida

Café Grumpy (also written Cafe Grumpy) is an American coffee roaster and cafe company based in Brooklyn, New York. Founded in 2005 by Caroline Bell and Chris Timbrell, the company has grown from a single shop in Greenpoint to multiple locations, including a cafe inside Grand Central Terminal. The Greenpoint location appeared as a workplace setting in HBO's Girls.

== History ==
Café Grumpy was founded in 2005 by Caroline Bell and Chris Timbrell, opening its first cafe in the Greenpoint neighborhood of Brooklyn. The company name refers to pre-coffee “grumpiness”; the logo is a stylized coffee bean with eyes and eyebrows, designed by Bell's brother Andrew Bell, founder of the design studio Dead Zebra Inc.

In the early 2010s, the company added locations in New York City, including a Lower East Side shop in 2011 and a Midtown/Times Square-area cafe in 2013. In May 2014, Café Grumpy opened in the Lexington Passage of Grand Central Terminal, replacing a Starbucks as part of a leasing shift toward locally owned businesses. The company continued to expand through the late 2010s and early 2020s.

== Operations ==
Café Grumpy roasts its own coffee in Brooklyn and, by the early 2010s, had added roasting, green-coffee buying, and baking to its operations. During the COVID-19 pandemic, reporting described a shift toward retail and grocery sales, including placements such as Whole Foods Market.

Several locations have limited or banned Wi-Fi and laptop use; co-founder Caroline Bell has expressed goals of encouraging conversation and turnover.

== Reception ==
In 2025, Food & Wine included New York City among the top U.S. coffee cities and mentioned Café Grumpy.

== In popular culture ==
The original Greenpoint location's proximity to Broadway Stages and a subsequent request from a location scout led to the rental of the space for HBO's Girls; the cafe serves as the fictional workplace for numerous characters including Ray Ploshansky, Hannah Horvath, and Elijah Krantz.

Additional shows including Blue Bloods, Lipstick Jungle, and The Black Donnellys have been filmed at Café Grumpy.

== See also ==
- Coffeehouse
- Third-wave coffee
