= Bluestone Lane =

Coffee company

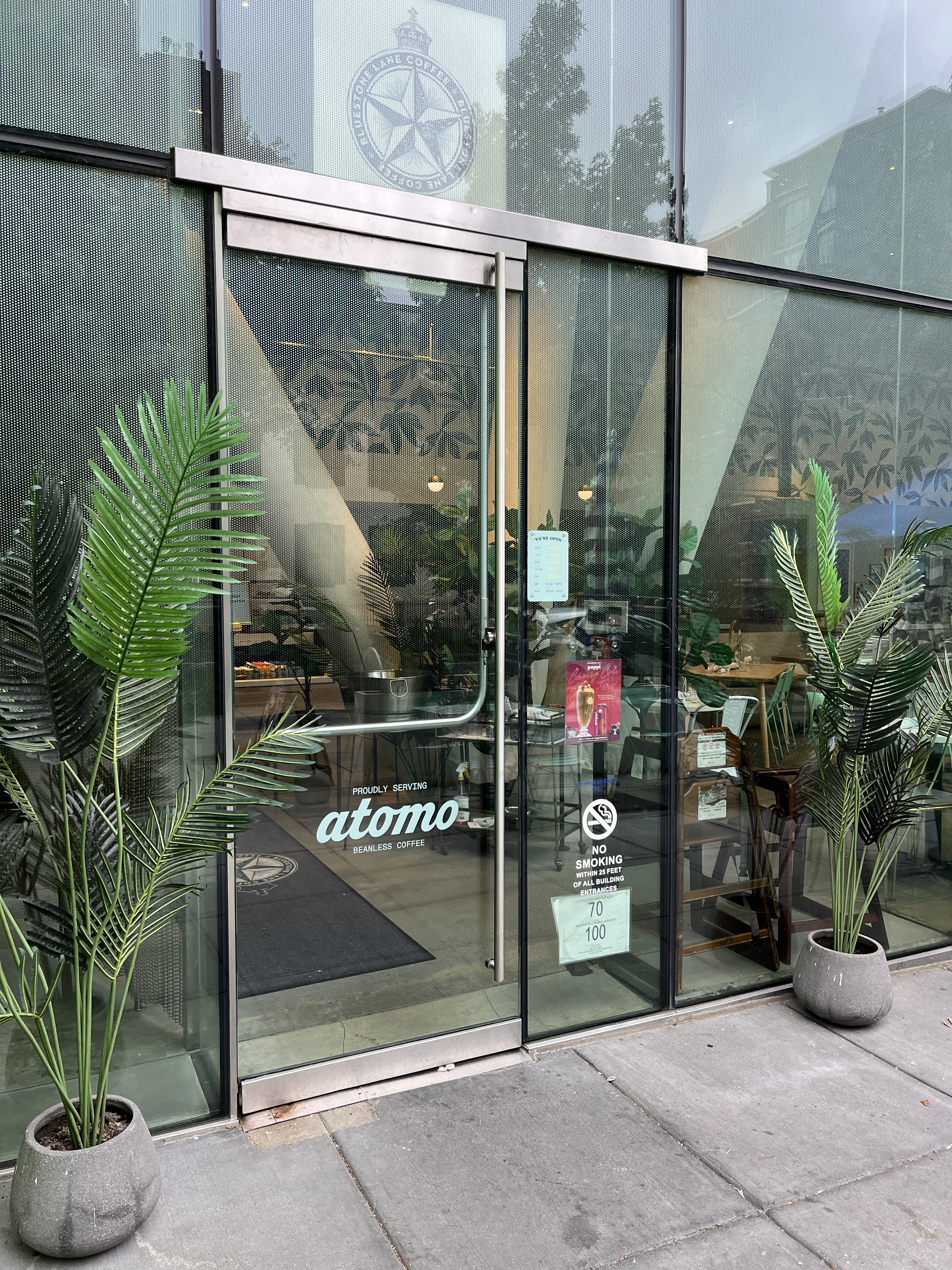
- Exterior of a Bluestone Lane coffee shop in Washington, D.C., in 2024
- Industry: Retail
- Founders: Nick Stone
- Number of locations: 55 stores (2026)
- Website: Official website

Bluestone Lane is an American coffeehouse company restaurant chain of Australian-style coffee houses.

Founder Nick Stone moved to New York City in 2010 and began working in corporate finance. During that time he founded Bluestone Lane, a chain of Aussie-style coffee shops and cafes. As of 2026, Bluestone Lane has 55 locations in 8 states and Washington D.C.

== See also ==
- Coffee culture in Australia
- List of coffeehouse chains
- List of coffee companies
- List of restaurant chains
