= Outline of New York City =

Flag of New York City

Seal of New York City

The following outline is provided as an overview of and topical guide to New York City:

New York City – largest city in the state of New York and most populous city in the United States. New York City has been described as the cultural, financial, and media capital of the world, and exerts a significant impact upon the world's commerce, entertainment, research, technology, education, politics, and sports. If New York City were a country, it would have the 12th highest GDP in the world. It is the most economically powerful city and the leading financial center of the world — anchored by Wall Street in the Financial District of Lower Manhattan, and home to the world's two largest stock exchanges by total market capitalization, the New York Stock Exchange and NASDAQ.

== General reference ==
- About New York City's names:
  - Common English names: New York; New York City
  - Former name: New Amsterdam
  - Some nicknames of New York City:
    - The Big Apple
    - The Capital of the World
    - The Center of the Universe
    - The City So Nice They Named It Twice ("New York, New York")
    - The City That Never Sleeps
    - The Empire City (obsolete)
    - Fun City (obsolete)
    - The Five Boroughs
    - Gotham
  - Adjectival(s): New York
  - Demonym(s): New Yorker, Knickerbocker
- Books about New York City

== Geography ==
Geography of New York City

- New York City is:
  - a city
    - Primate city of the United States
- Population of New York City: 8,804,190 (as of April 1, 2020)
- Area of New York City: 468.484 sq mi (1,213.37 km^{2})
- Atlas of New York City

=== Location of New York City ===
- New York City is situated within the following regions:
  - Northern Hemisphere and Western Hemisphere
  - North America
    - Northern America
      - United States
        - Eastern United States
          - East Coast of the United States
          - Northeastern United States
            - Northeast megalopolis
            - Mid-Atlantic
              - New York State
                - New York metropolitan area
                  - New York City occupies 5 counties, coinciding with its 5 boroughs
                    - Bronx County (The Bronx)
                    - Kings County (Brooklyn)
                    - New York County (Manhattan)
                    - Queens County (Queens)
                    - Richmond County (Staten Island)
  - Time zone(s): UTC−05:00 (Eastern Time Zone)

=== Environment ===
- Environmental issues in New York City
  - Food and water in New York City

=== Landforms ===
- Islands of New York City

=== Areas ===
==== Boroughs of New York City ====
- Boroughs of New York City – the city has 5:
  - The Bronx
  - Brooklyn
  - Manhattan
  - Queens
  - Staten Island

==== Neighborhoods in New York City ====
Neighborhoods in New York City

- New York City ethnic enclaves

=== Locations in New York City ===
==== Parks and gardens in New York City ====
Parks and gardens in New York City

- Parks in New York City
  - Central Park
  - Flushing Meadows–Corona Park
  - Forest Park (Queens)
  - Pelham Bay Park
  - Prospect Park (Brooklyn)
  - Staten Island Greenbelt
  - Van Cortlandt Park
- Zoos in New York City
  - Bronx Zoo
  - Central Park Zoo
  - Prospect Park Zoo
  - Queens Zoo
  - Staten Island Zoo

==== Historic locations in New York City ====
- List of National Historic Landmarks in New York City

=== Demographics ===
Demographics of New York City

- Demographic history of New York City
- Race and ethnicity in New York City
- New York City ethnic enclaves

By borough:

- Demographics of Brooklyn
- Demographics of Queens
- Demographics of the Bronx
- Demographics of Manhattan
- Demographics of Staten Island

== Government and politics ==
Government and politics of New York City

- Government of New York City
  - Mayor of New York City
    - New York City mayoral elections
    - Mayors of New York City
  - New York City Council
  - Borough president
- Law enforcement in New York City
  - New York City Police Department
  - Crime in New York City
    - Graffiti in New York City
- International relations of New York City
  - Headquarters of the United Nations
  - Sister cities of New York City

== History ==
History of New York City

- Timeline of New York City

=== By period or event ===
- Timeline of New York City
  - Timeline of labor in New York City
- 1962–63 New York City newspaper strike
- 1966 New York City transit strike
- HIV/AIDS epidemic in New York City
- 1980 New York City transit strike
- 1984 New York City Subway shooting
- 2001 September 11 attacks
- 2005 New York City transit strike
- 2006 New York City plane crash
- 2017 New York City transit crisis
- 2017 New York City truck attack
- COVID-19 pandemic in New York City

=== By subject ===
- Demographic history of New York City
- History of the New York City Subway
- Timeline of LGBTQ history in New York City
- History of public health in New York City

== Culture ==
Culture of New York City

- Architecture of New York City
  - Art Deco architecture of New York City
  - Buildings, sites, and monuments in New York City
    - Tallest building in New York City
- Cuisine of New York City
- Language in New York City
  - New York City English
    - New York City accent
- Media in New York City
- Museums and cultural institutions in New York City
  - Museums in New York City
- People from New York City
- "Sixth borough"
- Symbols of New York City
  - Flags of New York City
  - Seal of New York City
- Tourism in New York City
  - List of New York City gardens
  - Lists of New York City landmarks
  - List of New York City parks

=== Art in New York City ===
- New York City arts organizations
- Graffiti in New York City

==== Cinema of New York City ====
- Films set in New York City

==== Music of New York City ====
Music of New York City

- Songs about New York City

=== Cultural diversity in New York City ===
LGBTQ culture in New York City

- Transgender culture of New York City

==== Ethnic groups ====
- African Americans in New York City
  - Senegalese Americans in New York City
- Native Americans in New York City
  - Lenape (historical)
- Caribbean Americans in New York City
  - Puerto Ricans in New York City
  - Dominican Americans in New York City
  - Haitians in New York City
  - Jamaicans in New York City
  - Guyanese Americans in New York City
- South Asia
  - Indians in the New York metropolitan area
  - Bangladeshi Americans in New York City
  - Pakistani Americans in New York City
  - Sri Lankan Americans in New York City
- East Asia and Southeast Asia
  - Chinese Americans in New York
  - Taiwanese people in New York City
  - Japanese in New York City
  - Korean Americans in New York City
  - Filipinos in the New York metropolitan area
  - Vietnamese Americans in New York City
- Middle East and North Africa
  - Arab Americans in New York City
  - Syrian Americans in New York City
  - Yemeni Americans in New York City
- Europe and Central Asia
  - Russian Americans in New York City
  - Ukrainian Americans in New York City
  - Polish Americans in New York City
  - Belarusian Americans in New York City
  - Uzbek Americans in New York City
  - Italians in New York City
  - Irish Americans in New York City
  - Greek Americans in New York City
  - Albanians in New York City
  - Nordic Americans in New York City
  - Romani people in New York City
  - Romanians in New York City
  - Dutch Americans in New York City
  - Germans in New York City
- Latin America
  - Mexican Americans in New York City
  - Dominican Americans in New York City
  - Puerto Ricans in New York City
  - Ecuadorians in New York City
  - Colombians in New York City
  - Cubans in New York City
  - Brazilian Americans in New York City

==== Religion ====
- Judaism in New York City
  - History of the Jews in New York City
- Islam in New York City

=== Sports in New York City ===
Sports in New York City

- Baseball in New York City
  - Baseball parks in New York City
- Basketball in New York City
- Football in New York City
  - Soccer in New York City
- Running in New York City
  - New York City Marathon
- Traditional games of New York City

== Economy, infrastructure and human resources ==
Economy of New York City

- Communications in New York City
  - Media in New York City
- Companies based in New York City
  - List of biotech and pharmaceutical companies in the New York metropolitan area
  - List of tech companies in the New York metropolitan area
- Tourism in New York City

=== Public services ===
- Emergency services in New York City
  - Hospitals in New York City
  - New York City Fire Department
  - New York City Police Department
- Healthcare in New York City
- Libraries
  - Brooklyn Public Library
  - New York Public Library
  - Queens Library

=== Transportation ===
Transport in New York City

- History of transportation in New York City
- Transport agencies in New York City
  - New York City Department of Transportation
  - New York City Board of Transportation (defunct)
  - Vision Zero Initiative
  - Metropolitan Transportation Authority – manages:
    - New York City Subway
    - MTA Regional Bus Operations
    - Long Island Rail Road
    - Metro-North Railroad
- Air transport in New York City
  - Airports in New York City
- Maritime transport in New York City
  - Port of New York City
- Rail transit in New York City
  - New York City Subway
  - Long Island Rail Road
  - Metro-North Railroad
  - PATH
- Road transport in New York City
  - MTA Regional Bus Operations
  - Cycling in New York City
  - Bridges and tunnels in New York City

=== Education ===
Education in New York City

- New York City Department of Education
  - List of public elementary schools in New York City
  - List of high schools in New York City
- Secondary education in New York City
  - Colleges and universities in New York City
    - University of New York City

== See also ==
- Outline of geography
- Lists of New York City topics
