= Outline of New York =

Outline of New York may refer to:

- Outline of New York (state)
- Outline of New York City
