= Romani people in New York City =

Ethnic group

Romani people have lived and travelled throughout the state of New York. Muslim Romani people from southern Yugoslavia settled in the Bronx. An increase in attacks on Romani people in eastern Europe brought growing numbers of Romani refugees to New York City during the 1990s. Roma in Greater New York are mainly descended from liberated slaves and are known as the Vlax Roma, during the first four decades of the twentieth century. The majority of Vlax Roma in Manhattan belonged to the Kalderash subgroup. The Machvaya who came from Serbia settled in Brooklyn but they moved after World War II to Manhattan in increasing numbers. The Lovari, from Hungary, settled in Newark, New Jersey.

== See also ==
- Angelo My Love
- King of the Gypsies (film)
- Romani people in Chicago
