= Race and ethnicity in New York City =

Race and ethnicity in New York City (2022 ACS)
White	37.5%
Hispanic or Latino (of any race)	29.0%
Black or African American	23.1%
Asian	14.5%
Native American	0.6%
Pacific Islander	0.1%
Two or more races	8.9%
Figures add up to over 100% (Hispanic is not classified as a race)

According to the 2020 U.S. census, there were a total of 8,804,190 residents in New York City. A total of 2,719,856 residents identified as Non-Hispanic White (30.9% of the population), followed by 2,490,350 people of Hispanic origin (28.3%), 1,776,891 Black residents (20.2%) and 1,373,502 people of Asian origin (15.6%). A total of 143,632 residents identified with a different race (1.6%), while 299,959 identified with two or more races (3.4%).

Between 2010 and 2020, the city's Non-Hispanic White population declined in Queens, the Bronx, and then Staten Island, but increased in Brooklyn and Manhattan. The Black population declined in Brooklyn, Queens and Manhattan, while increasing in the Bronx and Staten Island. The Hispanic population increased in the Bronx, Queens, Brooklyn, and Staten Island, while declining in Manhattan. The Asian population increased in all five boroughs.

According to the 2019-20 demographic data from Mayor's Office of Immigrant Affairs, 3,030,397 city residents had been born outside of the United States. Non-Hispanic White and Black immigrants each made up 19% of this population, Hispanics made up 31%, and Asians 28%. Since the mid -20th century, the largest immigrant group has been Hispanic, but since the 2010s, Asian newcomers have been growing faster than any other group, having nearly caught up to the Hispanic immigrant population.

The largest ethnic groups as of the 2021 American Community Survey were African Americans, Dominicans, Puerto Ricans and Chinese.

The New York City metropolitan area is home to the largest population of Dominican ancestry in the United States, and as of 2023 Dominicans were the largest Hispanic group in the city, as well as the largest self-identified ethnic group in Manhattan. New York City is also home to the largest Jewish community outside Israel. It is additionally home to nearly a quarter of all Indian Americans and 15% of all Korean Americans; the largest African-American community of any city in the country; and including six Chinatowns in the city proper, comprised as of 2008 a population of 659,596 overseas Chinese, the largest outside of Asia. New York City, according to the 2010 Census, had become home to more than one million Asian Americans, greater than the combined totals of San Francisco and Los Angeles. New York contains the highest total Asian population of any U.S. city proper. 6.0% of New York City residents were of Chinese ethnicity, about two-fifths of whom lived in Queens. Koreans made up 1.2% of the city's population, and Japanese 0.3%. Filipinos were the largest southeast Asian ethnic group (0.8%), followed by Vietnamese (0.2%). Indians were the largest South Asian group, comprising 2.4% of the city's population, while Pakistanis were 0.4% and Bangladeshis 0.8%, respectively.

The Puerto Rican population of New York City is the largest outside Puerto Rico. The New York City metropolitan area is also home to the largest Italian population in North America and the third largest Italian population outside of Italy. Italians emigrated to the city in large numbers in the early 20th century, establishing several "Little Italies". The Irish also have a notable presence, along with Germans.

== Overview ==
Historical demographics	2022	2020	2010	1990	1970	1940
White (non-Hispanic)	31.2%	30.9%	33.3%	43.4%	64.0%	92.1%
Hispanic or Latino	29.0%	28.3%	28.6%	23.7%	15.2%	1.6%
Black or African American (non-Hispanic)	23.1%	20.2%	22.8%	28.8%	21.1%	6.1%
Asian and Pacific Islander (non-Hispanic)	14.5%	15.6%	12.6%	7.0%	1.2%	0.2%
Native American (non-Hispanic)	0.1%	0.2%	0.2%	0.4%	0.1%	N/A
Two or more races (non-Hispanic)	8.9%	3.4%	1.8%	N/A	N/A	N/A

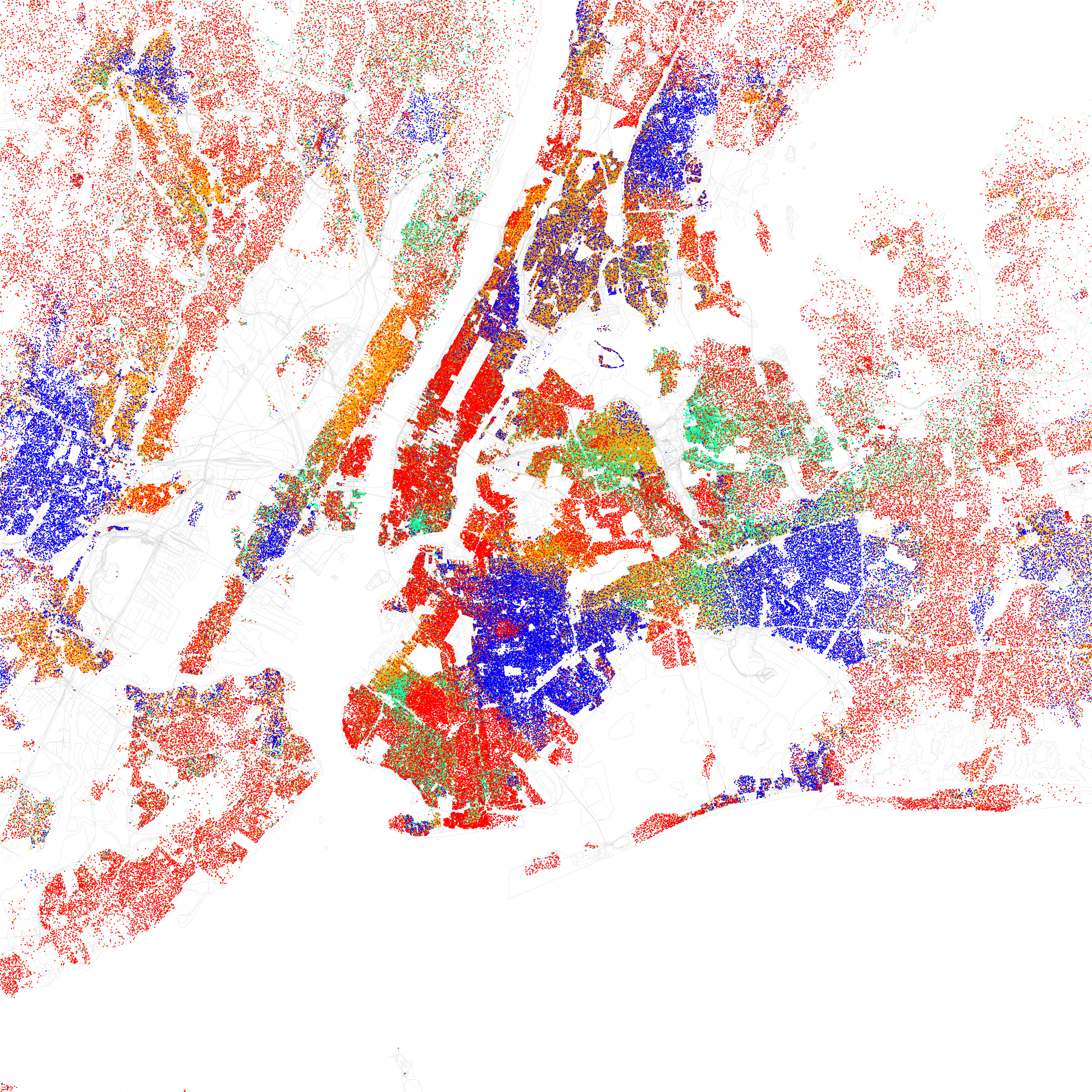
Map of racial distribution in New York, 2010 U.S. Census. Each dot is 25 people: White, Black, Asian, Hispanic, or Other

The city's population in 2020 was 30.9% White (non-Hispanic), 28.7% Hispanic or Latino, 20.2% Black or African American (non-Hispanic), 15.6% Asian, and 0.2% Native American (non-Hispanic). A total of 3.4% of the non-Hispanic population identified with more than one race. Throughout its history, New York has been a major port of entry for immigrants into the United States. More than 12 million European immigrants were received at Ellis Island between 1892 and 1954. The term "melting pot" was first coined to describe densely populated immigrant neighborhoods on the Lower East Side. By 1900, Germans were the largest immigrant group, followed by the Irish, Jews, and Italians. In 1940, Whites represented 92% of the city's population at 6.6 million.

Approximately 37% of the city's population is foreign born, and more than half of all children are born to mothers who are immigrants as of 2013. In New York, no single country or region of origin dominates. The ten largest sources of foreign-born individuals in the city as of 2011 were the Dominican Republic, China, Mexico, Guyana, Jamaica, Ecuador, Haiti, India, Russia, and Trinidad and Tobago, while the Bangladeshi-born immigrant population has become one of the fastest growing in the city, counting over 74,000 by 2011.

Asian Americans in New York City, according to the 2010 census, number more than one million, greater than the combined totals of San Francisco and Los Angeles. New York contains the highest total Asian population of any U.S. city proper. The New York City borough of Queens is home to the state's largest Asian American population and the largest Andean (Venezuelan, Colombian, Ecuadorian, Peruvian, and Bolivian) populations in the United States, and is also the most ethnically and linguistically diverse urban area in the world. Over 100,000 Venezuelan asylum seekers have arrived in New York City since 2022.

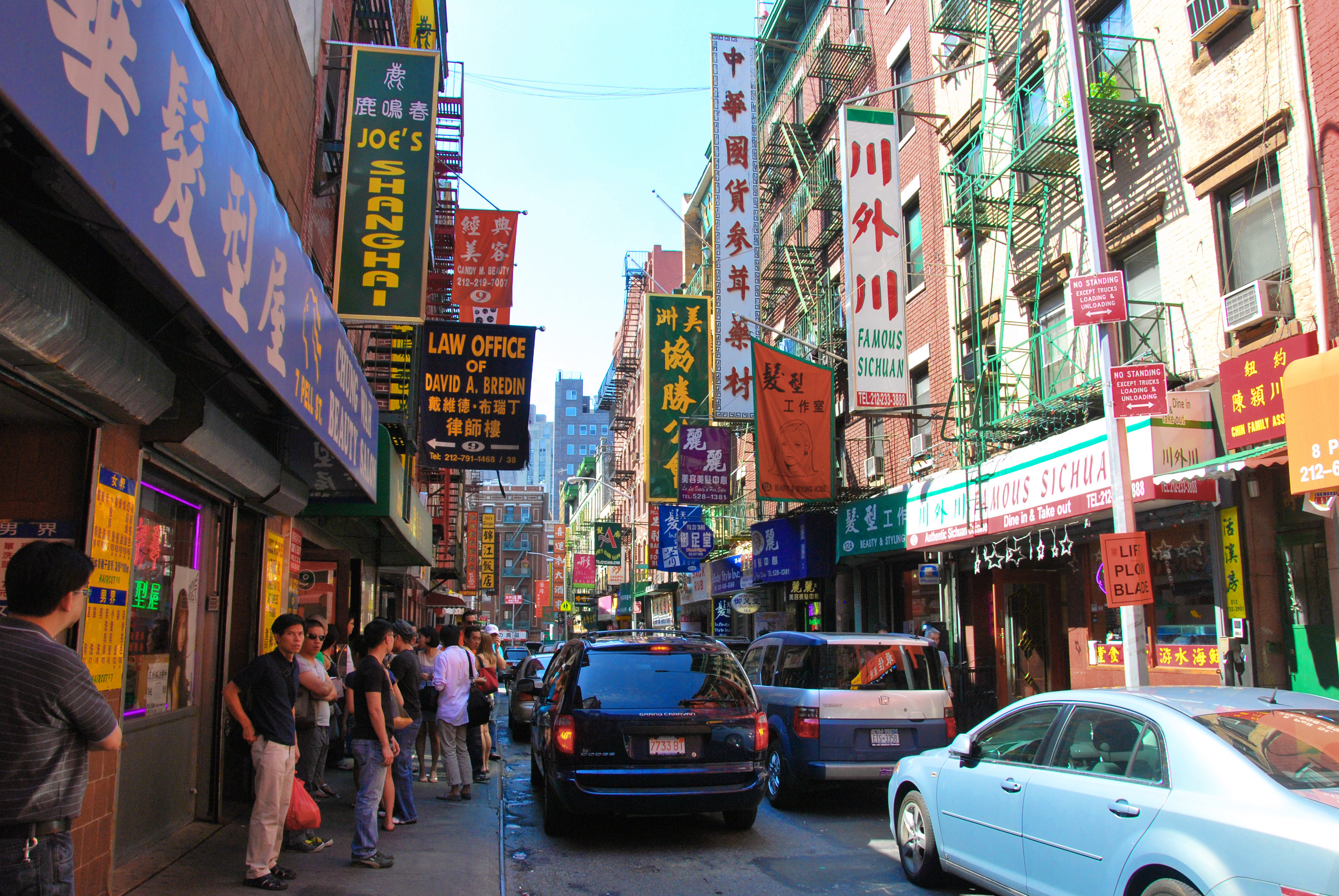
Chinatown, Manhattan

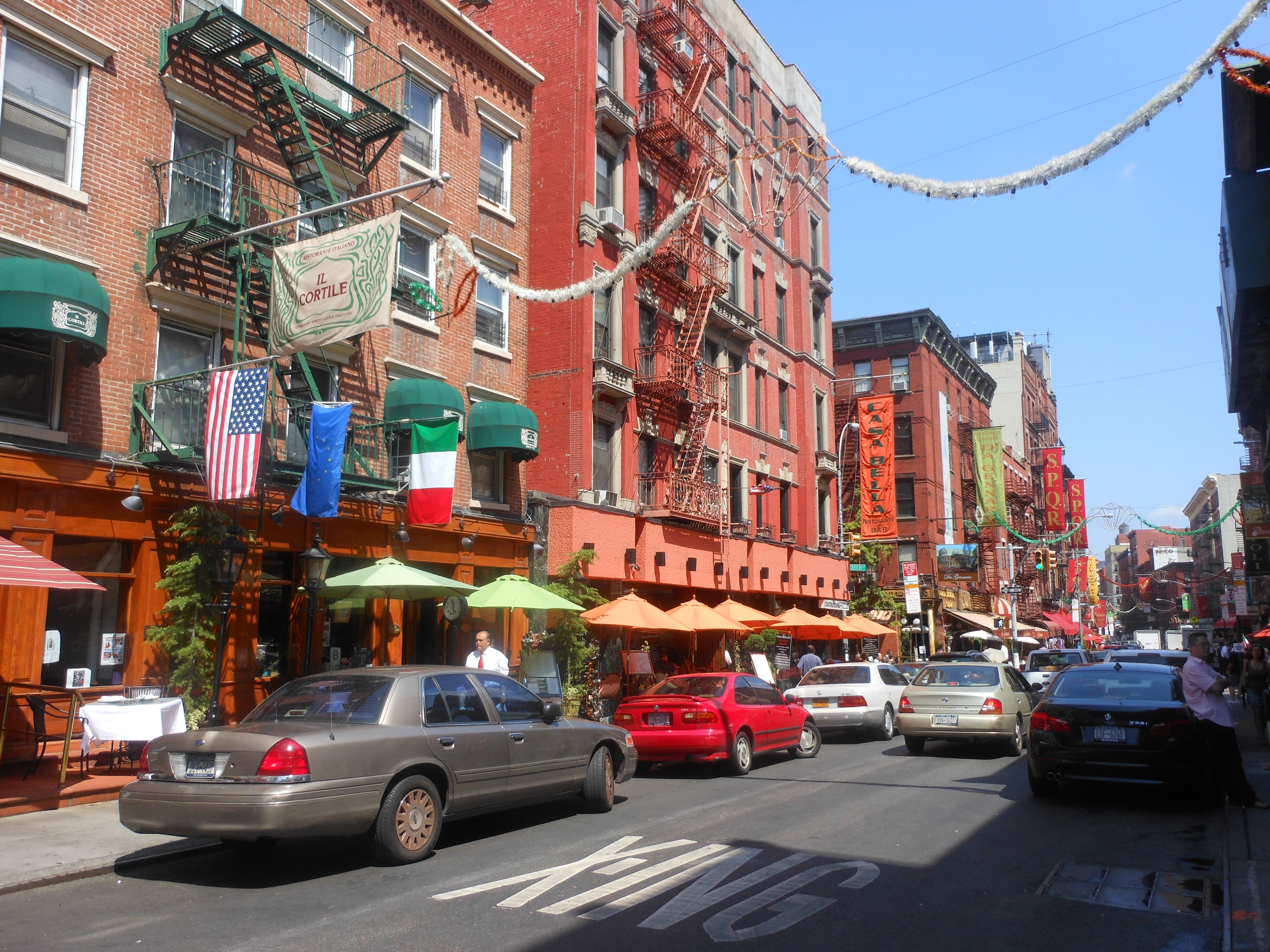
Little Italy, Manhattan

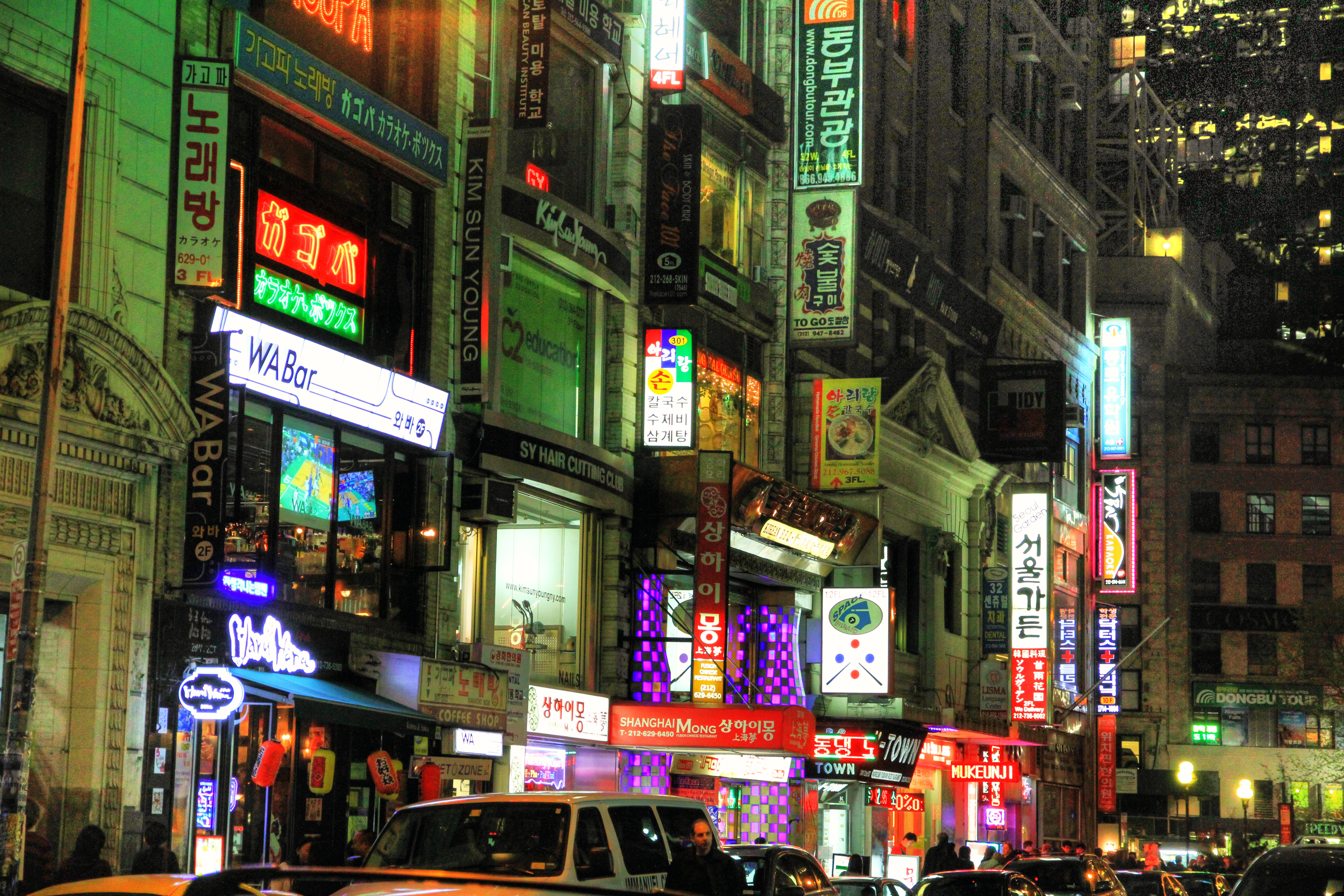
Koreatown, Manhattan

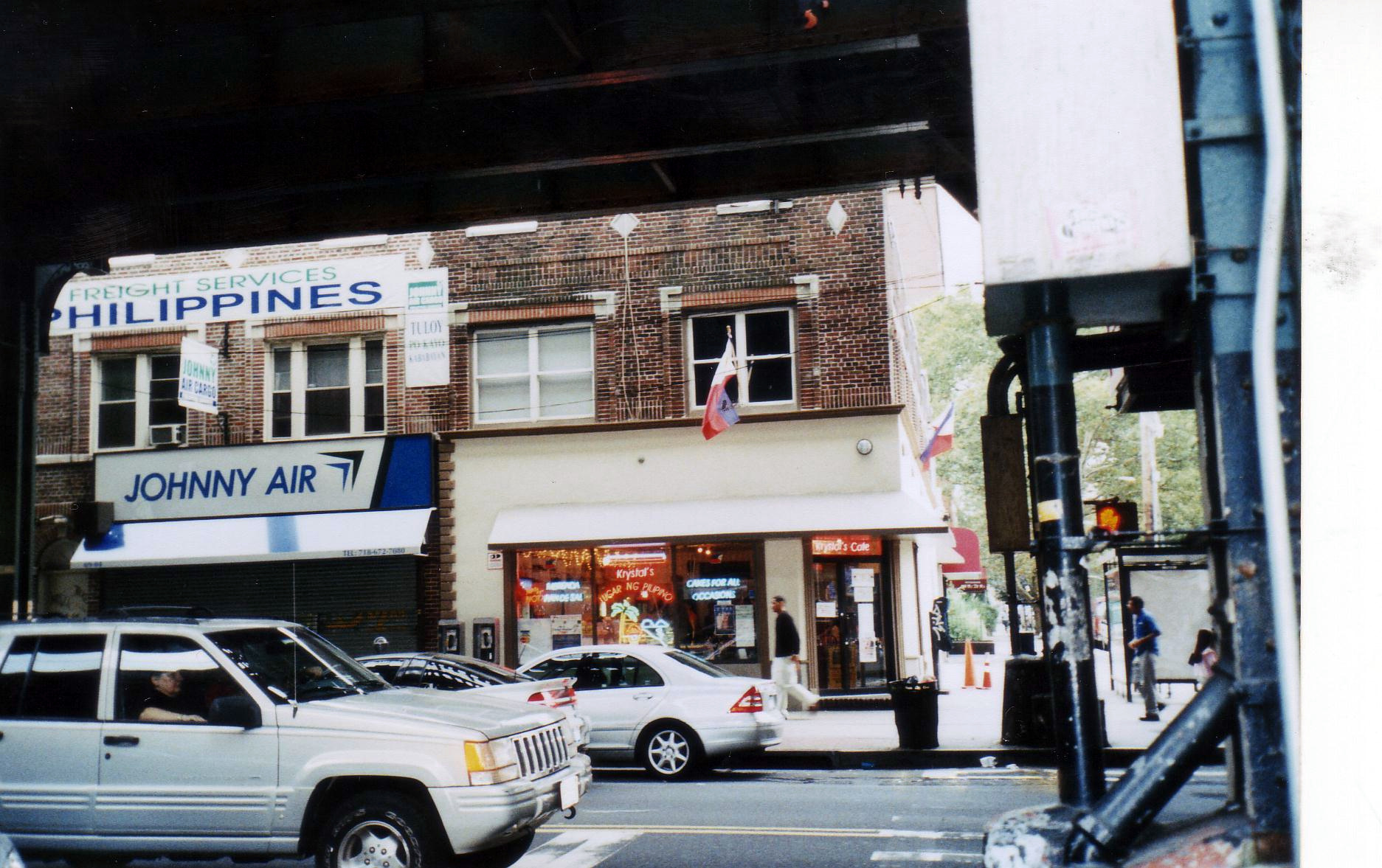
Little Manila, Queens

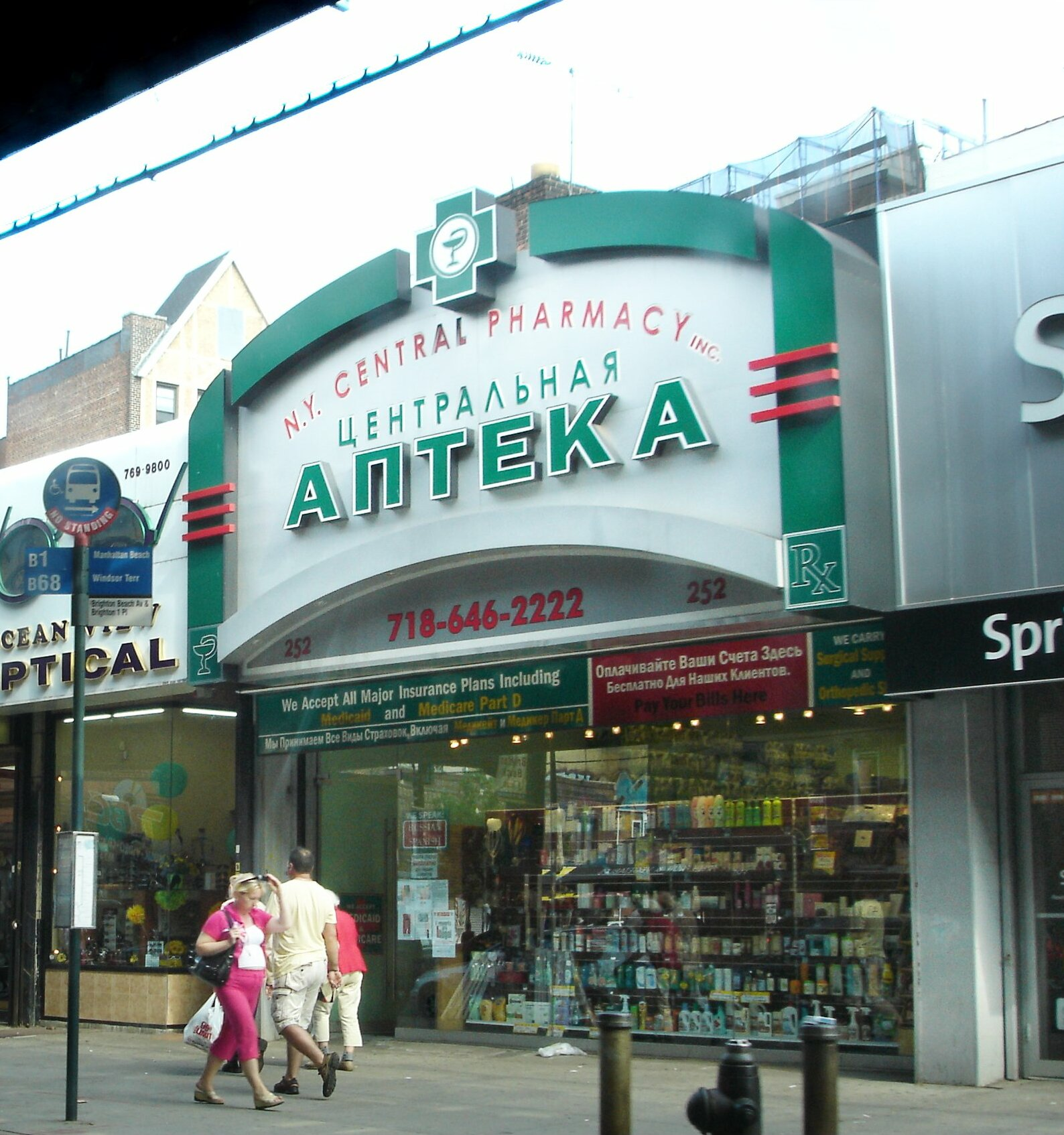
Little Russia, Brooklyn

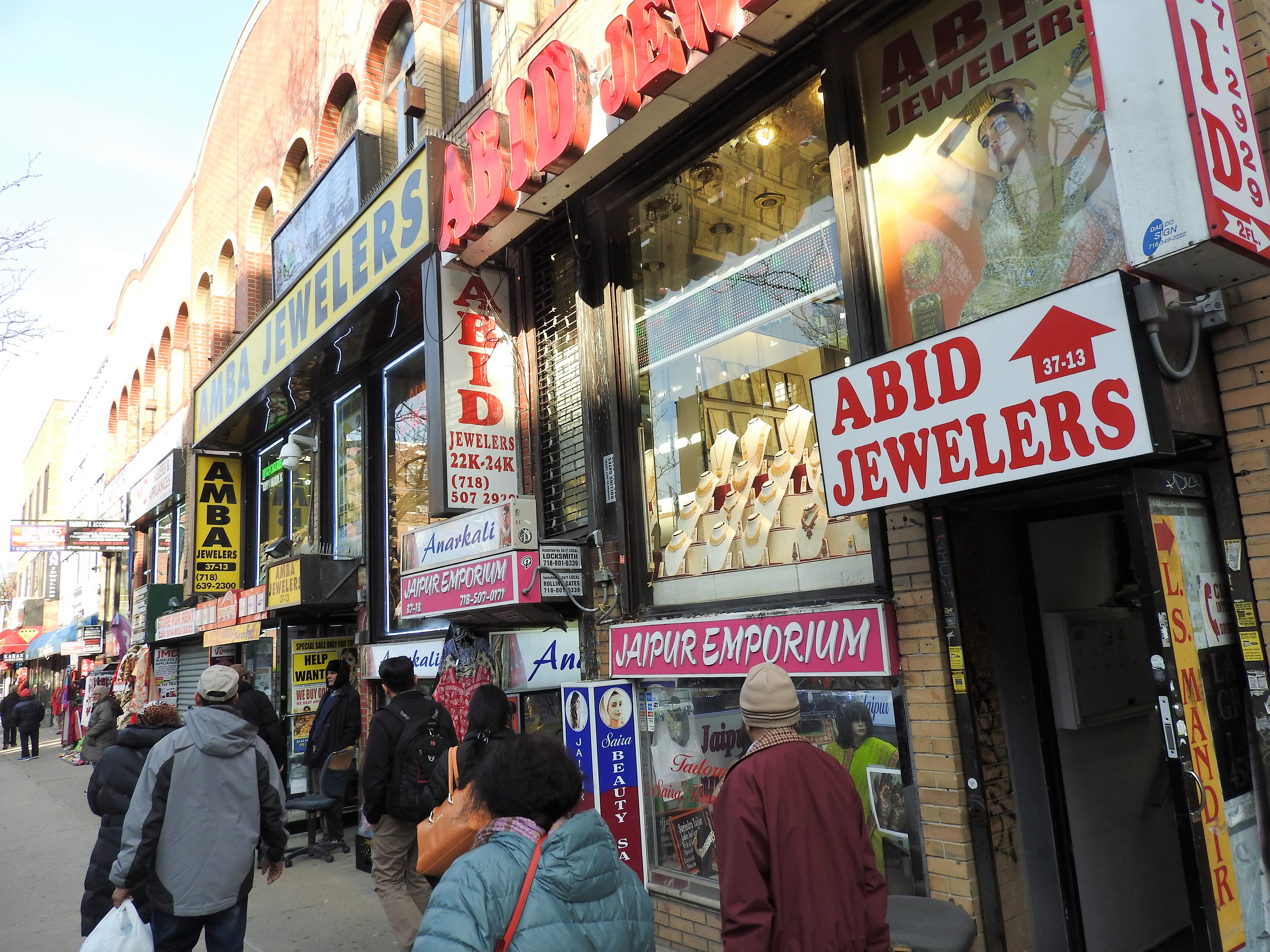
Little India, Queens

New York has the largest Chinese population of any city outside Asia. The Chinese population is the fastest-growing nationality in New York State. Multiple satellites of the original Manhattan's Chinatown—home to the highest concentration of Chinese people in the Western Hemisphere, as well as in Brooklyn, and around Flushing, Queens, are thriving as traditionally urban enclaves—while also expanding rapidly eastward into suburban Nassau County on Long Island, as the New York metropolitan region and New York State have become the top destinations for new Chinese immigrants, respectively, and large-scale Chinese immigration continues into New York City and surrounding areas, with the largest metropolitan Chinese diaspora outside Asia, including an estimated 812,410 individuals in 2015. As of 2023, illegal Chinese immigration to New York City, especially to Queens and its Flushing Chinatown, has accelerated.

In 2012, 6.3% of New York City was of Chinese ethnicity, with nearly three-fourths living in either Queens or Brooklyn. A community numbering 20,000 Korean-Chinese (Chaoxianzu or Joseonjok) is centered in Flushing, Queens, while New York City is home to the largest Tibetan population outside China, India, and Nepal, also centered in Queens. Koreans made up 1.2% of the city's population, and Japanese 0.3%. Filipinos were the largest Southeast Asian ethnic group at 0.8%, followed by Vietnamese, who made up 0.2% of New York City's population in 2010. Indians are the largest South Asian group, comprising 2.4% of the city's population, with Bangladeshis and Pakistanis at 0.7% and 0.5%, respectively. Queens is the preferred borough of settlement for Asian Indians, Koreans, Filipinos, and Malaysians, and other Southeast Asians.

New York City has the largest European and non-Hispanic white population of any American city. At 2.7 million in 2012, New York's non-Hispanic White population is larger than the non-Hispanic White populations of Los Angeles, Chicago, and Houston combined. The non-Hispanic White population has begun to increase since 2010.

The European diaspora residing in the city is very diverse. According to 2012 census estimates, there were roughly 560,000 Italian Americans, 385,000 Irish Americans, 253,000 German Americans, 223,000 Russian Americans, 201,000 Polish Americans, and 137,000 English Americans. Additionally, Greek and French Americans numbered 65,000 each, with those of Hungarian descent estimated at 60,000 people. Ukrainian and Scottish Americans numbered 55,000 and 35,000, respectively. People identifying ancestry from Spain numbered 30,838 total in 2010, and Belarusians numbered about 55,000 as of 2010. Brighton Beach, Brooklyn, also known as Little Russia or Little Odessa, is the largest center of the Russian- and Ukrainian-American communities.

People of Norwegian and Swedish descent both stood at about 20,000 each, while people of Czech, Lithuanian, Portuguese, Scotch-Irish, and Welsh descent all numbered between 12,000 and 14,000. Arab Americans number over 160,000 in New York City, with the highest concentration in Brooklyn. Central Asians, primarily Uzbek Americans, are a rapidly growing segment of the city's non-Hispanic White population, enumerating over 30,000, and including more than half of all Central Asian immigrants to the United States, most settling in Queens or Brooklyn. There is also an increasing influx of Armenian Americans based in Queens. Albanian Americans are most highly concentrated in the Bronx, while Astoria, Queens is the epicenter of American Greek culture as well as the Cypriot community.

New York is home to the highest Jewish population of any city in the world, numbering 960,000 in 2023, more than Tel Aviv and Jerusalem combined. In the borough of Brooklyn, an estimated 1 in 4 residents is Jewish. The city's Jewish communities are derived from many diverse sects, predominantly from around the Middle East and Eastern Europe, and including a rapidly growing Orthodox Jewish population, the largest outside Israel.

The metropolitan area is home to 20% of the nation's Indian Americans and at least 20 Little India enclaves, and 15% of all Korean Americans and four Koreatowns; the largest Asian Indian population in the Western Hemisphere; the largest Russian American, Italian American, and African American populations; the largest Dominican American, Puerto Rican American, and South American and second-largest overall Hispanic population in the United States, numbering 4.8 million; and includes multiple established Chinatowns within New York City alone.

Venezuela, Ecuador, Colombia, Guyana, Peru, and Brazil, are the top source countries from South America for immigrants to the New York City region; the Dominican Republic, Jamaica, Haiti, and Trinidad and Tobago in the Caribbean; Nigeria, Egypt, Ghana, Tanzania, Kenya, and South Africa from Africa; and El Salvador, Honduras, and Guatemala in Central America. Amidst a resurgence of Puerto Rican migration to New York City, this population had increased to approximately 1.5 million in the metropolitan area as of 2016.

Since 2010, Little Australia has emerged and is growing rapidly, representing the Australasian presence in Nolita, Manhattan. In 2011, there were an estimated 20,000 Australian residents of New York City, nearly quadruple the 5,537 in 2005. Qantas of Australia and Air New Zealand have been planning for long-haul flights from New York to Sydney and Auckland, which would both rank among the longest non-stop flights in the world. A Little Sri Lanka has developed in the Tompkinsville neighborhood of Staten Island. Le Petit Sénégal, or Little Senegal, is based in Harlem. Richmond Hill, Queens is often thought of as "Little Guyana" for its large Guyanese community, as well as Punjab Avenue (ਪੰਜਾਬ ਐਵੇਨਿਊ), or Little Punjab, for its high concentration of Punjabi people. Little Poland is located in Greenpoint, Brooklyn.

Many Romani people moved to New York City from other parts of the United States after relief programs were put into effect in the 1930s. Roma from Hungary went to New York after the Hungarian Revolution of 1956.

== Minority ancestries ==
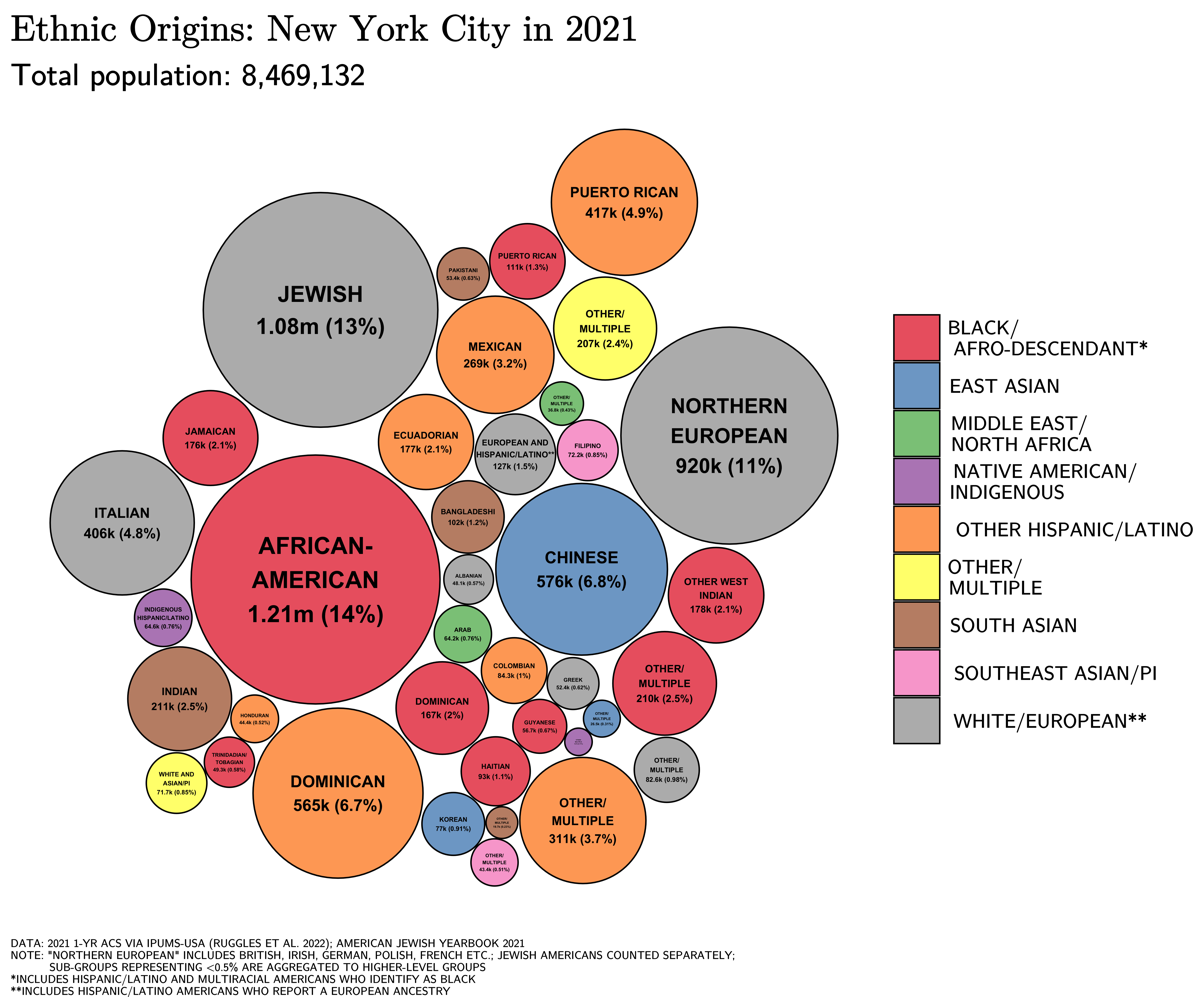
Ethnic origins in New York City

Multigenerational African Americans, Afro-Caribbeans, Afro-Latinos and African Immigrants make up 25.1% of New York City's population. According to the U.S. Census Bureau, there were 2,086,566 black people residing in New York City. Percentage wise, approximately two out of every five black residents of New York City resides in Brooklyn (primarily in the Central, Northern, and Eastern sections of the borough), one out of every five resides in Bronx (mainly in the borough's Northeastern, Southeastern and Southern sections) one out of every five resides in Queens (mainly in the borough's Southeastern area), with the remaining black residents residing in Manhattan (primarily in Harlem) and Staten Island (mainly the North Shore of the borough).

Native Americans make up 0.4% of New York City's population. According to the survey, there were 29,569 Native Americans residing in New York City. Of 29,569 Native Americans, 2,075 were of the Cherokee tribal grouping. In addition, 213 were of the Navajo tribal grouping. Also, 42 people identified themselves as Chippewa, and 47 people identified themselves as Sioux. There is a number of Mohawks indigenous to the New York city area and/or Upstate New York, and many Mohawks arrived in the 1930s to work in the skyscraper building construction industry. And a few Lenape Indians indigenous to the New York city area still remain in the city, migrated from other rural parts to Manhattan.

Asian Americans make up 11.8% of New York City's population. According to the survey, there were 976,807 Asian Americans residing in New York City. Of 976,807 Asian Americans, 445,145 were of Chinese descent, representing 5.4% of the city's population. In addition, there were 226,888 Indian Americans residing in the city, representing 2.7% of the population. Approximately 103,660 people identified themselves as "Other Asian", a category that includes people of Cambodian, Laotian, Hmong, and Pakistani descent. Individuals in this category represent 1.2% of the city's population. There were 88,162 Korean Americans residing in the city, representing 1.1% of the population. Other Asian American groups include those of Filipino (68,826, 0.8%), Japanese (26,096, 0.3%), and Vietnamese (18,030, 0.2%) descent.

Pacific Islander Americans make up 0.1% of New York City's population. According to the survey, there were 4,941 Pacific Islander Americans residing in New York City. Of 4,941 Pacific Islander Americans, 1,992 were Native Hawaiian. Approximately 904 were of Samoan descent, and 504 were of Guamanian descent. In addition, 1,541 were of other Pacific Islander ancestries.

Multiracial Americans make up 2.1% of New York City's population. According to the survey, there were 177,643 multiracial Americans residing in New York City. People of black and white ancestry numbered at 37,124, making up 0.4% of the population. People of white and Asian ancestry numbered at 22,242, making up 0.3% of the population. People of white/Native American ancestry (10,762) and black/Native American ancestry (10,221) each made up 0.1% of the city's population. The term "Multiracial American", however, can be very misleading. For example, many people of Latin American background may have various racial ancestries. Furthermore, there are many Americans who have multiple racial ancestries who are not aware of it. Therefore, the actual numbers are likely much higher.

Hispanics and Latinos make up 27.5% of New York City's population. According to the American Community Survey, there were 2,287,905 Hispanic or Latino Americans residing in New York City. The Hispanic/Latino population is categorized with four groups, "Puerto Rican" (785,618 or 9.4%), "Mexican" (297,581 or 3.6%), "Cuban" (42,377 or 0.5%), and "Other Hispanic or Latino" (1,165,576 or 14.0%). While most Hispanics in New York City do not select a race in addition to their ethnicity in the American Community Survey, among those foreign-born, 33% also self-identify as white, and 9% as black.

According to the 2006-2007 Center for Latin American, Caribbean & Latino Studies:

- Puerto Rican: (1,278,628)
- Dominican: (602,093)
- Mexican: (289,755)
- Ecuadorian: (201,708)
- Colombian: (113,469)
- Salvadoran:(100,396)
- Other Hispanic or Latino: (351,635)

Note: This source contains all of the numerical information in the data above.

=== White ancestries ===
White Americans make up 44.6% of New York City's population. According to the survey, there were 3,704,243 White Americans residing in New York City. White Americans of non-Hispanic origin make up 35.1% of the city's population. There are 2,918,976 non-Hispanic whites residing in the city. Much of New York City's European American population consists of individuals of Italian, Irish, German, Russian, Polish, English, and Greek ancestry.

There is a considerable Bulgarian population in New York. Bulgarians migrated in New York in the 1900s.

According to the 2006–2008 American Community Survey, the top ten White, European ancestries were the following:

- Italian: 8.2% (684,230)
- Irish: 5.3% (443,364)
- German: 3.6% (296,901)
- Russian: 3.1% (260,821)
- Polish: 2.8% (237,919)
- English: 1.9% (160,472)
- Greek: 1.0% (83,575)
- French: 0.9% (73,587)
- Hungarian: 0.7% (59,225)
- Ukrainian: 0.6% (49,643)

Other smaller European ancestries include:

- Portuguese: 0.5% (46,384)
- Scottish: 0.5% (41,787)
- Scotch-Irish: 0.3% (28,770)
- Dutch: 0.3% (24,776)
- Norwegian: 0.3% (24,737)
- Swedish: 0.3% (22,206)

=== Diversity of New York City's boroughs ===
According to a 2001 study by Claritas, four of the city's five boroughs ranked among the nation's twenty most diverse counties. Queens ranked 1st, Brooklyn 3rd, Manhattan 7th, and The Bronx 17th. In addition, Hudson County and Essex County, New Jersey, both of which are part of the New York Metropolitan Area, ranked 6th and 15th, respectively.

The city has several demographically unique characteristics. Queens is the only large county in the United States where the median income among black households, about $52,000 a year, has surpassed that of whites.

The New York City metropolitan area is home to the largest Jewish community outside Israel. It is also home to nearly a quarter of the nation's Indian American population, and the largest African American community of any city in the country. New York City, with about 800,000 Puerto Rican residents, has the largest Puerto Rican population outside of Puerto Rico. Another historically significant ethnic group are Italians, who emigrated to the city in large numbers during the late 19th century. New York City is home to the largest Italian American population in the United States. Only Buenos Aires, Argentina and Sao Paulo, Brazil have more Italians outside of Italy than New York City. The Irish and Germans also have a notable presence.

% Foreign-born by borough 1970–2006Source: NYC.gov
Borough	1970	1980	1990	2000	2006
Brooklyn	17.5	23.8	29.2	37.8	37.8
Queens	21.0	28.6	36.2	46.1	48.5
Manhattan	20.0	24.4	25.8	29.4	28.7
Bronx	15.6	18.4	22.8	29.0	31.8
Staten Island	9.0	9.8	11.8	16.4	20.9
Total	18.2	23.6	28.4	35.9	37.0

Jurisdiction	Population 2000 census	% white	% black or African American	% Asian	% Other	% mixed race	% Hispanic/ Latino of any race	% Catholic	% not affiliated	% Jewish	% Protestant	Estimate of % not reporting
		Race					Ethnicity	Religious groups				
Brooklyn	2,465,326	41.2	36.4	7.5	10.6	4.3	19.8	37	4	15	8	33
Queens	2,229,379	44.1	20.0	17.6	12.3	6.1	25.0	29	37	11	5	15
Manhattan	1,537,195	54.4	17.4	9.4	14.7	4.1	27.2	37	11	20	9	19
Bronx	1,332,650	29.9	35.6	3.0	25.7	5.8	48.4	44	14	6	5	29
Staten Island	443,728	77.6	9.7	5.7	4.3	2.7	12.1	60	11	8	5	14
NYC Total	8,008,278	44.7	26.6	9.8	14.0	4.9	27.0	37	17	13	6	24
NY State	18,976,457	67.9	15.9	5.5	7.5	3.1	15.1	42	20	9	10	16
USA	281,421,906	75.1	12.3	3.6	6.5	2.4	12.5	22	37	2	23	12
Source: 2000 Census American Indian, Native Alaskan, Native Hawaiian, and Pacific Islander make up 2.9% of the population of NYC, and have been included with "Other".
Source for religious groups: ARDA

== Historical population data ==
=== Changes in population by race and ethnicity ===
Racial composition	2010	1990	1970	1940
White	44.0%	52.3%	76.6%	93.6%
—Non-Hispanic	33.3%	43.2%	62.9%	92.0%
Black or African American	22.8%	28.7%	21.1%	6.1%
Hispanic or Latino (of any race)	28.6%	24.4%	16.2%	1.6%
Asian	12.6%	7.0%	1.2%	–

=== Changes in population by borough ===
Historical population of the present area of New York City and its boroughs
Year	Manhattan	Brooklyn	Queens	Bronx	Staten Is.	Total	∆Total per decade	yearly growth
1613	0*	0*	0*	0*	0*	0*	—	—
1613	1*	0*	0*	0*	0*	1*	∞*	∞*%
1630	hundreds*	?	?	?	?	c.270*	c.153*	39.00%*
1698	4,937	2,017	not in these sources but positive	not in these sources but positive	727	7,681	c.1,090*	5.05%*
1771	21,863	3,623	not in these sources but positive	not in these sources but positive	2,847	28,423	2,841	1.81%
1790	33,131	4,549	6,159	1,781	3,827	49,447	11,065	2.96%
1800	60,515	5,740	6,642	1,755	4,563	79,215	29,768	4.83%
1810	96,373	8,303	7,444	2,267	5,347	119,734	40,519	4.22%
1820	123,706	11,187	8,246	2,782	6,135	152,056	32,322	2.42%
1830	202,589	20,535	9,049	3,023	7,082	242,278	90,222	4.77%
1840	312,710	47,613	14,480	5,346	10,965	391,114	148,836	4.91%
1850	515,547	138,882	18,593	8,032	15,061	696,115	305,001	5.93%
1860	813,669	279,122	32,903	23,593	25,492	1,174,779	478,664	5.37%
1870	942,292	419,921	45,468	37,393	33,029	1,478,103	303,324	2.32%
1880	1,164,673	599,495	56,559	51,980	38,991	1,911,698	433,595	2.61%
1890	1,441,216	838,547	87,050	88,908	51,693	2,507,414	595,716	2.75%
†1900	1,850,093	1,166,582	152,999	200,507	67,021	3,437,202	929,788	3.20%
1910	2,331,542	1,634,351	284,041	430,980	85,969	4,766,883	1,329,681	3.32%
1920	2,284,103	2,018,356	469,042	732,016	116,531	5,620,048	853,165	1.66%
1930	1,867,312	2,560,401	1,079,129	1,265,258	158,346	6,930,446	1,310,398	2.12%
1940	1,889,924	2,698,285	1,297,634	1,394,711	174,441	7,454,995	524,549	0.73%
1950	1,960,101	2,738,175	1,550,849	1,451,277	191,555	7,891,957	436,962	0.57%
1960	1,698,281	2,627,319	1,809,578	1,424,815	221,991	7,781,984	-109,973	-0.14%
1970	1,539,233	2,602,012	1,986,473	1,471,701	295,443	7,894,862	112,878	0.14%
1980	1,428,285	2,230,936	1,891,325	1,168,972	352,121	7,071,639	-823,223	-1.10%
1990	1,487,536	2,300,664	1,951,598	1,203,789	378,977	7,322,564	250,925	0.35%
2000	1,537,195	2,465,326	2,229,379	1,332,650	443,728	8,008,278	685,714	0.90%
2010	1,585,873	2,504,700	2,230,722	1,385,108	468,730	8,175,133	166,855	0.21%
2020	1,694,251	2,736,074	2,405,464	1,472,654	495,747	8,804,190	629,057	0.74%
Year	Manhattan	Brooklyn	Queens	Bronx	Staten Is.	Total	∆Total per decade	yearly growth
* Excludes hard-to-estimate native resident counts All population figures are consistent with present-day boundaries † First census after the consolidation of the five boroughs						1613-2020:	216,319	∞*%

Click here to view the density of New York City as an interactive map of the 1900 census, shortly after municipal consolidation of the five boroughs in 1898.

=== Languages ===
In 1940, a little over half of all White New Yorkers spoke English as their first languages, as large percentages spoke Yiddish, Italian, or German.

Languages spoken in NYC among White population (1940)
1. English (53.8%)
2. Yiddish (13.1%)
3. Italian (12.8%)
4. German (6.14%)
5. Polish (2.34%)
6. Others (11.9%)

Language	Speakers	Percent (all)	Percent (foreign-born)
English	3,755,580	53.77%	17.98%
Yiddish	911,280	13.05%	23.93%
Italian	896,160	12.83%	19.13%
German	429,060	6.14%	13.54%
Polish	163,500	2.34%	4.2%
Russian	149,840	2.15%	5.17%
Swedish	38,240	0.55%	1.35%
French	37,860	0.54%	1.25%
Norwegian	35,620	0.51%	1.28%
Czech	28,700	0.36%	0.6%
Finnish	13,280	0.19%	0.43%
Danish	9,140	0.13%	0.37%
Dutch	6,440	0.09%	0.25%
Slovenian	4,260	0.06%	0.12%
Others	330,680	4.73%	26.39%
Not reported	175,080	2.51%	1.99%
Total	6,984,720	100%	100%

== Ethnicities and enclaves ==
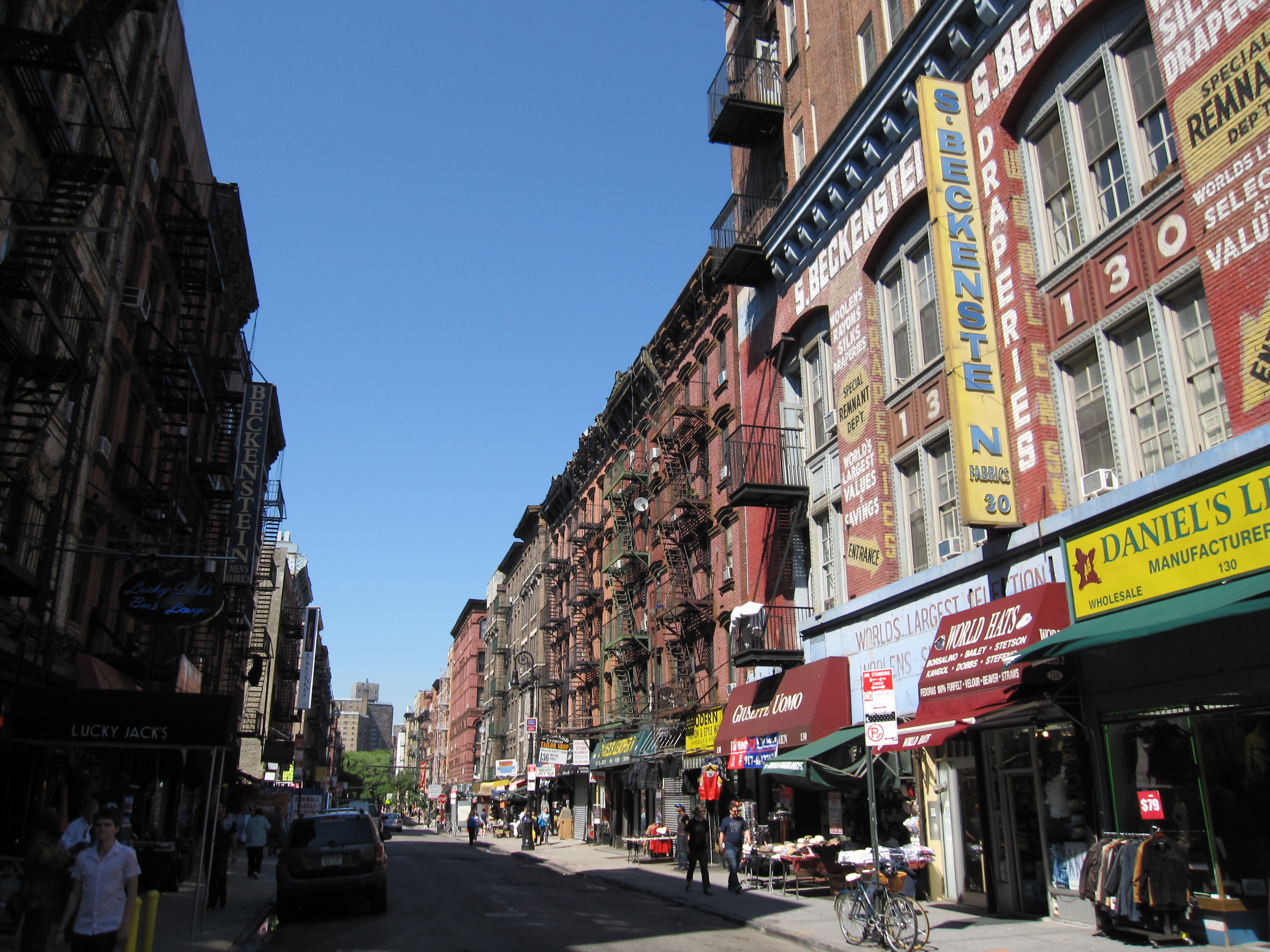
Orchard Street on the Lower East Side, once a bustling Jewish enclave

Since its founding in 1625 by Dutch traders as New Amsterdam, New York City has been a major destination for immigrants of many nationalities who have formed ethnic enclaves, neighborhoods dominated by one ethnicity. African-American freedmen also moved to New York City in the Great Migration and the later Second Great Migration and formed ethnic enclaves. These neighborhoods are set apart from the main city by differences such as food, goods for sale, or even language.

As of 2019, there are 3.1 million immigrants in New York City. This accounts for 37% of the city population and 45% of its workforce. Ethnic enclaves in New York include Caribbean, Asian, European, Latin American, Middle Eastern and Jewish groups, who immigrated from or whose ancestors immigrated from various countries. As many as 800 languages are spoken in New York.

== Ancestries ==
=== Ancestries ===
Ancestry by origin	Number	%
American	307,187	
Arab	118,494	
Czech	10,331	
Danish	10,218	
Dutch	19,867	
English	173,530	

== See also ==
- Race and ethnicity in the United States
