= Demographic history of New York City =

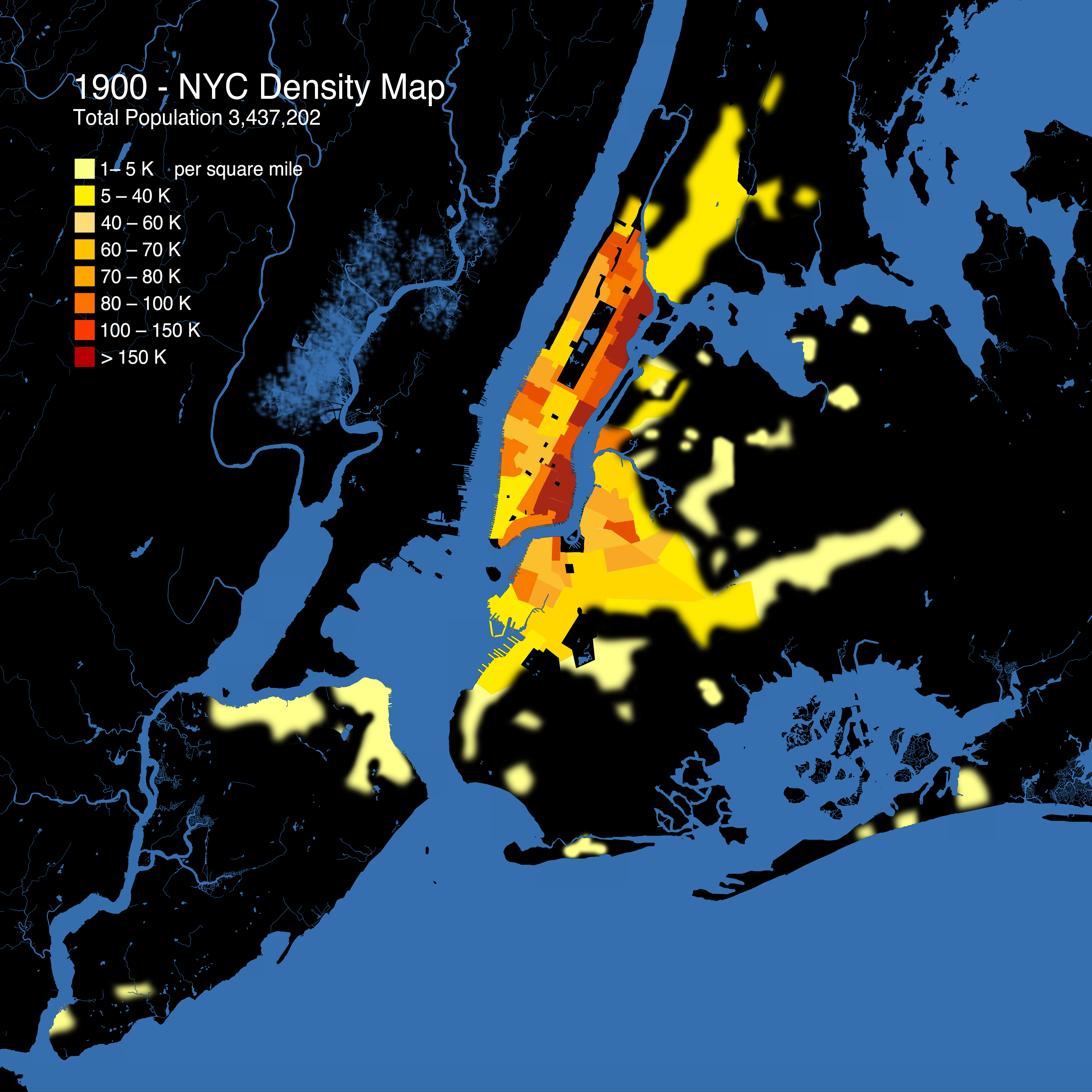
Map depicting NYC's density c.1900 on a sliding scale from 1,000 to 150,000 people per square mile. Areas with less than 1,000 per square mile are excluded. Interactive Map

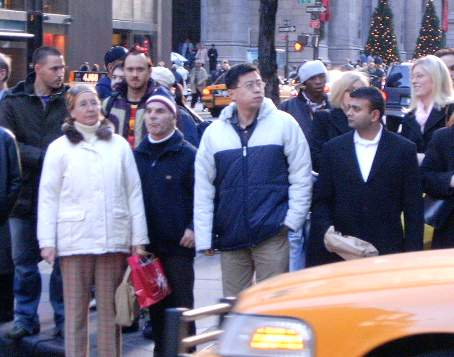
People waiting to cross Fifth Avenue

The racial and ethnic history of New York City has varied widely, from its sale to the Dutch by Native American residents, to the modern multi-cultural period.

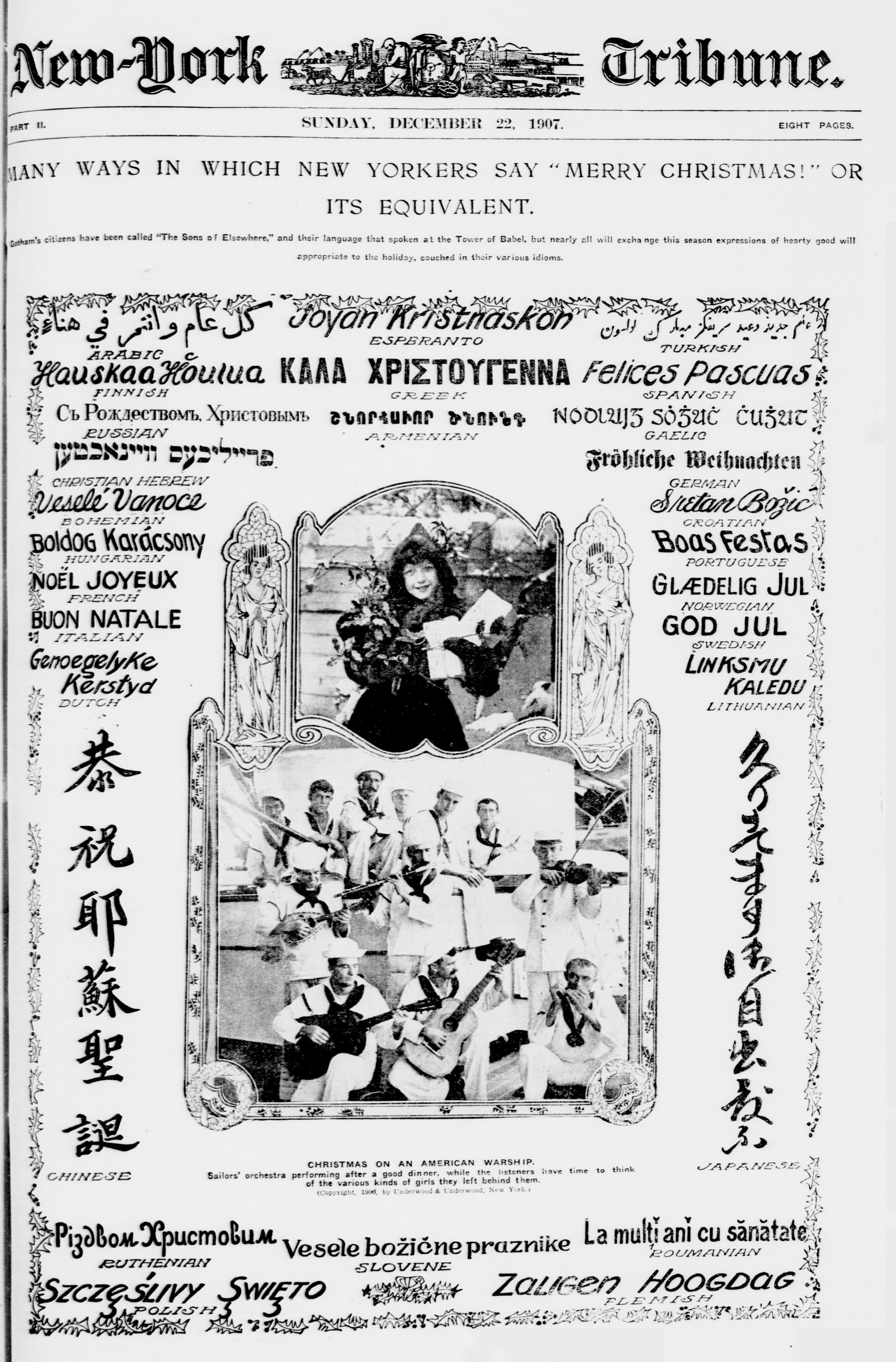
Poster from 1907: The many ways in which New Yorkers say "Merry Christmas" or its equivalent; in Arabic, Armenian, Chinese, Croatian, Czech, Dutch, Esperanto, Finnish, Flemish, French, Gaelic, German, Greek, Yiddish (labeled as "Christian Hebrew"), Hungarian, Italian, Japanese, Lithuanian, Norwegian, Polish, Portuguese, Romanian, Russian, Slovene, Spanish, Swedish, Turkish and Ukrainian. "Gotham's citizens have been called "The Sons of Elsewhere", and their language that spoken at the Tower of Babel..."

New York City has had a largely white population, and most foreign-born immigrants to the city before the end of World War II were from Europe. However, this changed in the decades after World War II, when all of the boroughs became less white, and when immigration from places outside Europe was increased largely due to the Immigration and Nationality Act of 1965.

== Overview ==
The population of New York City was over 90% Non-Hispanic White until the post-World War II era. Large numbers of Blacks, Hispanics, or Asians began settling in Manhattan in the 1920s and in the rest of NYC after World War II. The slowest area in the city to change its racial makeup was Staten Island, which was the only borough of New York City to retain a Non-Hispanic White majority after the 1980s. Between 1900 and 2010, New York City's total Black population increased by about thirty-five times, while its Asian population increased by over one-hundred-and-fifty times over the same period. The large Black migration to New York City helped form the Harlem Renaissance, a rich cultural period for the African Americans living in New York (especially in Harlem neighborhood, the namesake) between the end of World War I and the Great Depression. New York's Hispanic population increased by almost twenty times between 1940 and 2010, while its total Non-Hispanic White population decreased by over 60% over the same time period.

New York's five boroughs have had different settlement histories. The Bronx and Brooklyn were the most popular destinations for Blacks to settle, while Queens was the most popular destination for Asian migrants to NYC and the Bronx was the most popular destination for Hispanic migrants to move to. New York City's total population more than doubled between 1900 and 2010 (with a period of population stagnation between 1950 and 1990). The Bronx, Queens, and Staten Island experienced enormous population growth between 1900 and 2010, much higher than New York's average population growth. Brooklyn's population grew at a much slower rate during this time period, while Manhattan actually had fewer people in 2010 than in 1900.

New York City has always had a much greater percentage of immigrants as part of its total population than the whole United States has. Right before World War I over 40% of New York City's total population was composed of immigrants. After immigration restrictions were passed in the 1920s, immigrants as a percentage of New York's total population dropped to 18% in 1970, before rebounding back up to 36% in 2000. The recorded increase in the city's immigrant percentage after 1970 occurred after the passage of the Immigration Act of 1965 (which took effect in 1968) and at a time when a greater number of immigrants than before were coming to the United States. Most of the earlier immigrants to New York City were from Europe (initially from Western Europe, and then more from Eastern Europe). A large percentage of the immigrants that came to New York City after 1965 were from non-European countries. Large numbers of Irish people arrived in New York City during the Great Famine in the 1840s, while Germans, Italians, Jews, and other European ethnic groups arrived in NYC mostly during the late 19th and early 20th centuries. Because of the abolition of the National Origins Formula, a large percentage of the immigrants that came to New York City after 1965 were from non-European countries. Of the immigrants in the state, about three million live in New York City. The number of immigrants living in New York City increased only slightly from 2000 to 2011, with an increase from 2,871,032 to 3,066,599 residents being born outside the United States.

== Citywide ==
The 1890 United States census showed a total population of 1,515,301, the foreign-born were 639,943 at 42%. The city did not trust the accuracy of the census so conducted an 1890 New York City Police census. This census revealed a population of 1,710,715. During the early 20th century, from 1900 to 1940, New York City's population was predominantly White, accounting for over 93% of the population, with the Black community constituting less than 3%. By the 1950s, the White population decreased to around 90%, while the Black population increased to nearly 10%. From 1970 to 1980, more pronounced shifts occurred, with the White population dropping to 60.72%, the Black population increasing to 25.23%, and a notable rise in the Hispanic/Latino population to 19.88%. The 1990s brought further diversification, with the White population falling to 44.66% by 2000, and growth in the Black, Asian, and Hispanic/Latino populations. The most recent decade from 2010 to 2020 saw a continued decrease in the White population to 34.09%, significant growth in the Asian population to 15.73%, stability in the Black population around 22-25%, and growth in the Hispanic/Latino community to 28.29%. The Other or Mixed category also grew to 28.11%. Throughout this period, New York City remained a hub for immigrants, with the foreign-born population peaking at 37.51% in 2010. Overall, these trends reflect the transformation of New York City into an increasingly multicultural metropolis, with a progressive decline in the White population and expanding representation of Black, Asian, Hispanic/Latino, and Other or Mixed groups.

Year	Population	White (includes White Hispanics)	% W	Non-Hispanic Whites	% ANG	Black	% B	Asian	% A	Other or Mixed	% O/M	Hispanic/ Latino	% H/L	Foreign born	% FB
1900	3,437,202	3,369,898	98.04	N/A	N/A	60,666	1.76	6,607	0.19	31	0	N/A	N/A	1,270,080	36.95
1910	4,766,883	4,669,162	97.95	N/A	N/A	91,709	1.92	5,669	0.12	343	0.01	N/A	N/A	1,944,357	40.79
1920	5,620,048	5,459,463	97.14	N/A	N/A	152,467	2.71	7,969	0.14	149	0	N/A	N/A	2,028,160	36.09
1930	6,930,446	6,589,377	95.08	N/A	N/A	327,706	4.73	12,972	0.19	391	0.01	N/A	N/A	2,358,686	34.03
1940	7,454,995	6,977,501	93.59	6,856,586	91.97	458,444	6.15	17,986	0.24	1,064	0.01	120,915	1.62	2,138,657	28.69
1950	7,891,957	7,116,441	90.17	N/A	N/A	747,608	9.47	21,441	0.27	6,467	0.08	N/A	N/A	1,784,206	22.61
1960	7,781,984	6,640,662	85.33	N/A	N/A	1,087,931	13.98	43,103	0.55	10,288	0.13	N/A	N/A	1,558,690	20.03
1970	7,894,862	6,048,841	76.62	4,969,749	62.95	1,668,115	21.13	94,499	1.20	83,407	1.06	1,278,630	16.20	1,437,058	18.20
1980	7,071,639	4,294,075	60.72	3,668,945	51.88	1,784,337	25.23	231,501	3.27	761,762	10.77	1,406,024	19.88	1,670,199	23.62
1990	7,322,564	3,827,088	52.26	3,163,125	43.20	2,102,512	28.71	512,719	7.00	880,245	12.02	1,783,511	24.36	2,082,931	28.45
2000	8,008,278	3,576,385	44.66	2,801,267	34.98	2,129,762	26.59	792,477	9.90	1,509,654	18.85	2,160,554	26.98	2,871,032	35.85
2010	8,175,133	3,597,341	44.00	2,722,904	33.31	2,088,510	25.55	1,043,535	12.77	1,445,747	17.68	2,336,076	28.58	3,066,599	37.51
2020	8,804,190	3,000,945	34.09	2,719,856	30.89	1,943,645	22.08	1,385,144	15.73	2,474,456	28.11	2,490,350	28.29	N/A^{[A]}	N/A

^{A} Foreign-born population data from 2020 Census not yet available (as of Sept 2021).

== By borough ==
=== The Bronx ===
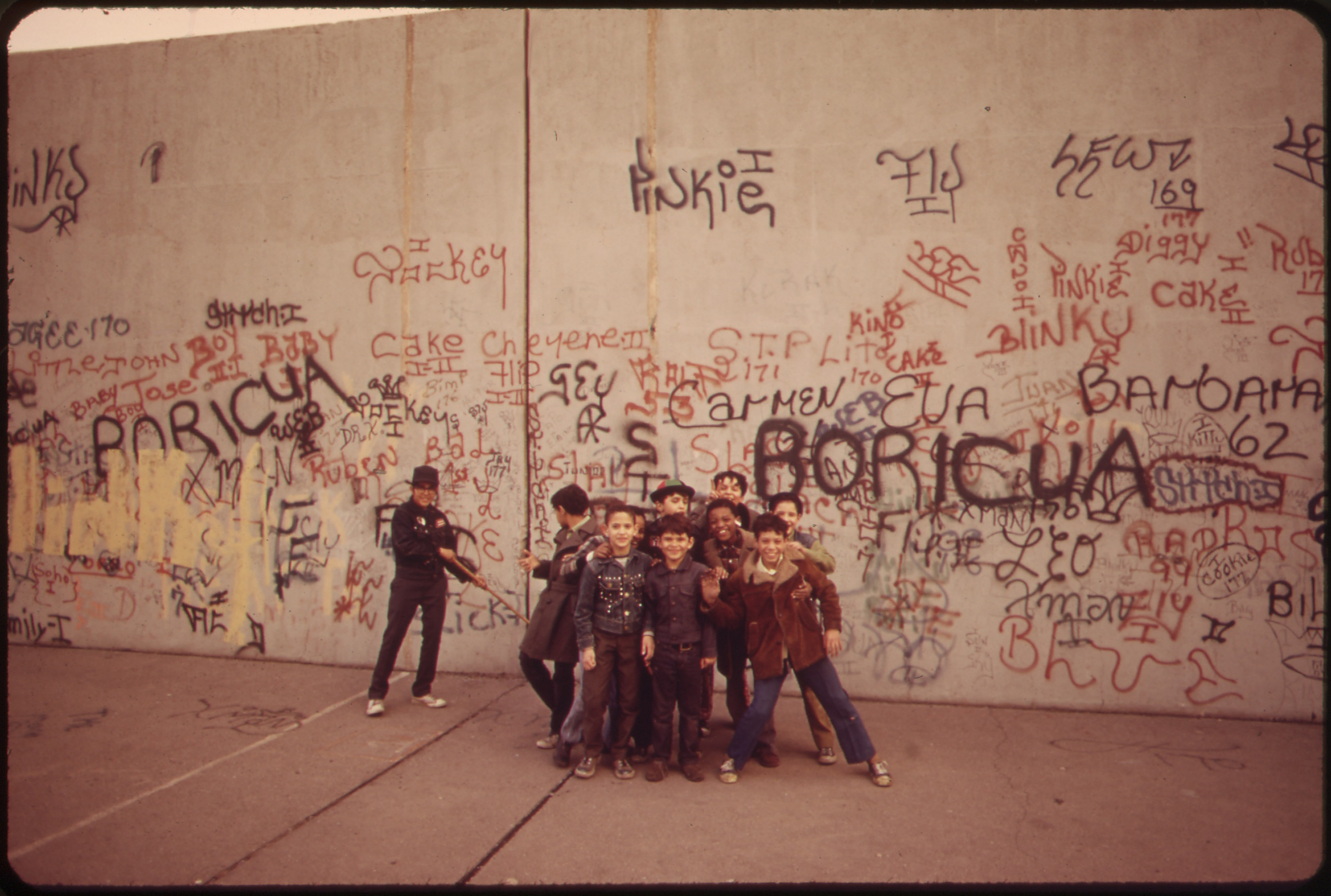
Children playing on sidewalk in 1973

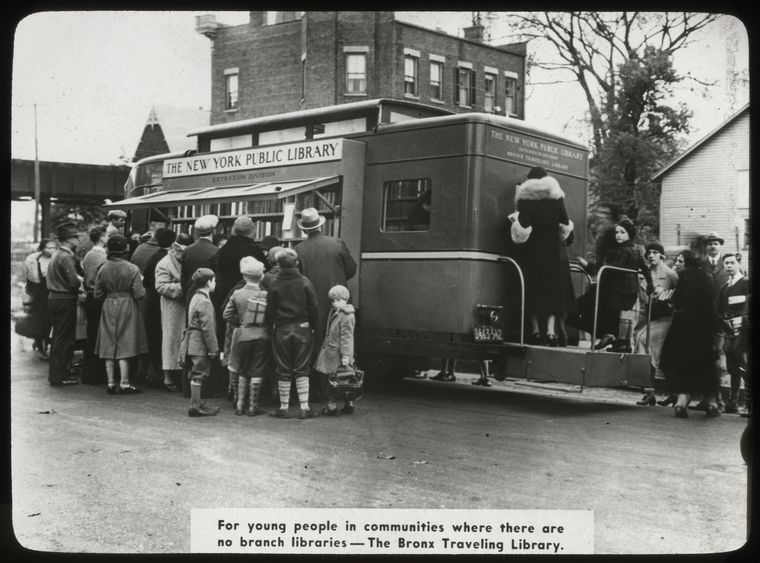
Traveling public library in 1938

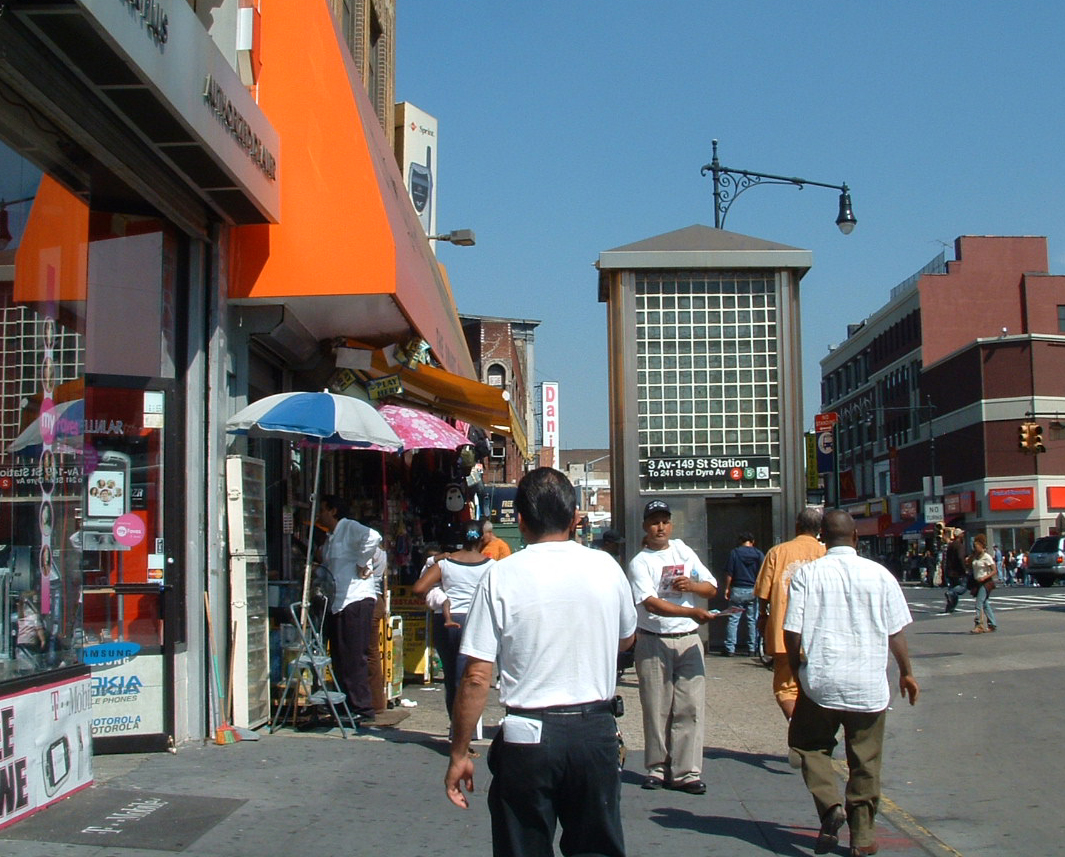
The Hub in 2007

Year	Population	White (includes White Hispanics)	% W	Non-Hispanic Whites	% ANG	Black	% B	Asian	% A	Other or Mixed	% O/M	Hispanic/ Latino	% H/L	Foreign born	% FB
1900	200,507	197,923	98.71	N/A	N/A	2,370	1.18	208	0.10	6	0	N/A	N/A	61,258	30.55
1910	430,980	426,650	99.00	N/A	N/A	4,117	0.96	189	0.04	24	0.01	N/A	N/A	149,427	34.67
1920	732,016	726,990	99.31	N/A	N/A	4,803	0.66	215	0.03	8	0	N/A	N/A	267,742	36.58
1930	1,265,258	1,251,823	98.94	N/A	N/A	12,930	1.02	476	0.04	29	0	N/A	N/A	479,451	37.89
1940	1,394,711	1,370,319	98.25	N/A	N/A	23,529	1.69	801	0.06	62	0	N/A	N/A	463,453	33.23
1950	1,451,277	1,351,662	93.14	N/A	N/A	97,752	6.74	1,249	0.09	614	0.04	N/A	N/A	373,894	25.76
1960	1,424,815	1,256,284	88.17	N/A	N/A	163,896	11.50	3,544	0.25	1,091	0.08	N/A	N/A	306,592	21.52
1970	1,471,701	1,080,859	73.44	N/A	N/A	357,681	24.30	7,792	0.53	25,369	1.72	N/A	N/A	229,210	15.57
1980	1,168,972	554,046	47.40	396,836	33.95	371,926	31.82	15,163	1.30	227,837	19.49	396,353	33.91	215,313	18.42
1990	1,203,789	430,077	35.73	272,503	22.64	449,399	37.33	35,562	2.95	288,751	23.99	523,111	43.46	274,793	22.83
2000	1,332,650	398,003	29.87	193,651	14.53	475,007	35.64	41,503	3.11	418,137	31.38	644,705	48.38	385,827	28.95
2010	1,385,108	386,497	27.90	151,209	10.92	505,200	36.47	50,897	3.68	442,514	31.95	741,413	53.53	518,353	37.42
2021	1,435,070	657,262	45.80	131,140	9.14	617,080	43.00	57,402	4.00	43,052	3.00	774,937	54.00	489,358	31.00

=== Brooklyn ===
In the early 1900s, Brooklyn was predominantly White, with the White population comprising 98.31% in 1900 and staying above 98% through 1920. The Black population was very small at this time, constituting only 1.57% in 1900, while the Asian population was even smaller at 0.11%.

The 1930s started to see a slight decline in the White population, dropping to 97.20%, and the Black population began to grow, reaching 2.69% by 1930. The Asian population remained negligible.

From the 1940s to the 1960s, the decline in the White population became more pronounced, dropping to 92.22% in 1950 and then to 85.48% in 1960. During this period, the Black population increased to 14.14%, and the Asian population began to grow, albeit slowly.

The 1970s and 1980s marked a significant shift in Brooklyn's demographics. The White population fell to 73.24% in 1970 and then sharply to 56.01% in 1980. The Black population increased to 25.22% in 1970 and 32.40% in 1980. The Asian community and Other or Mixed category became more substantial, reaching 1.93% and 9.67%, respectively, in 1980. The Hispanic/Latino community grew to 17.58%, and the foreign-born population remained relatively high, at 23.80% in 1980.

In the last three decades, from 1990 to 2010, Brooklyn's racial and ethnic diversity expanded further. The White population declined to below half of the total, reaching 42.80% in 2010, while the Black population remained around 34-37%. The Asian population increased significantly to 10.52% by 2010, and the Other or Mixed category reached 12.34%. The Hispanic/Latino population hovered around 19-20%, and the foreign-born population grew to 36.44% in 2010.

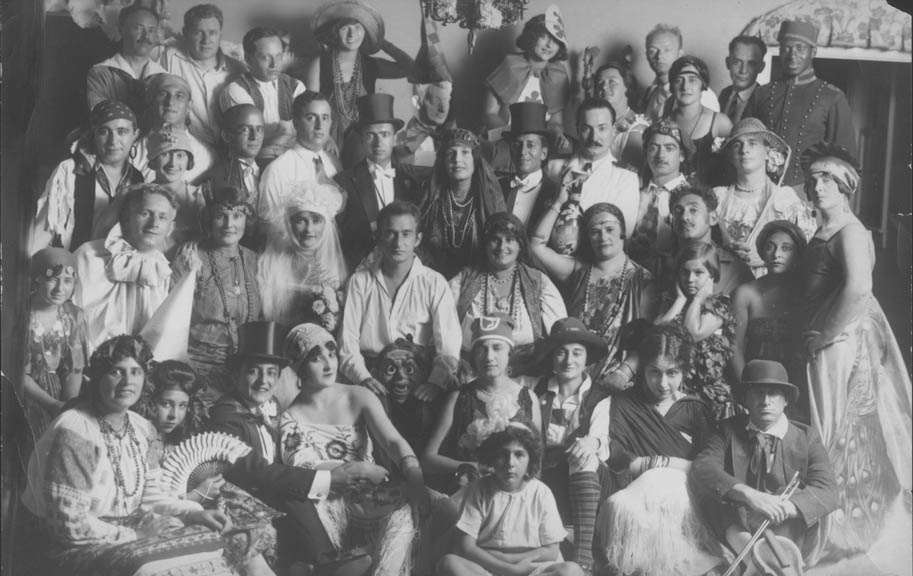
Purim party c.1925

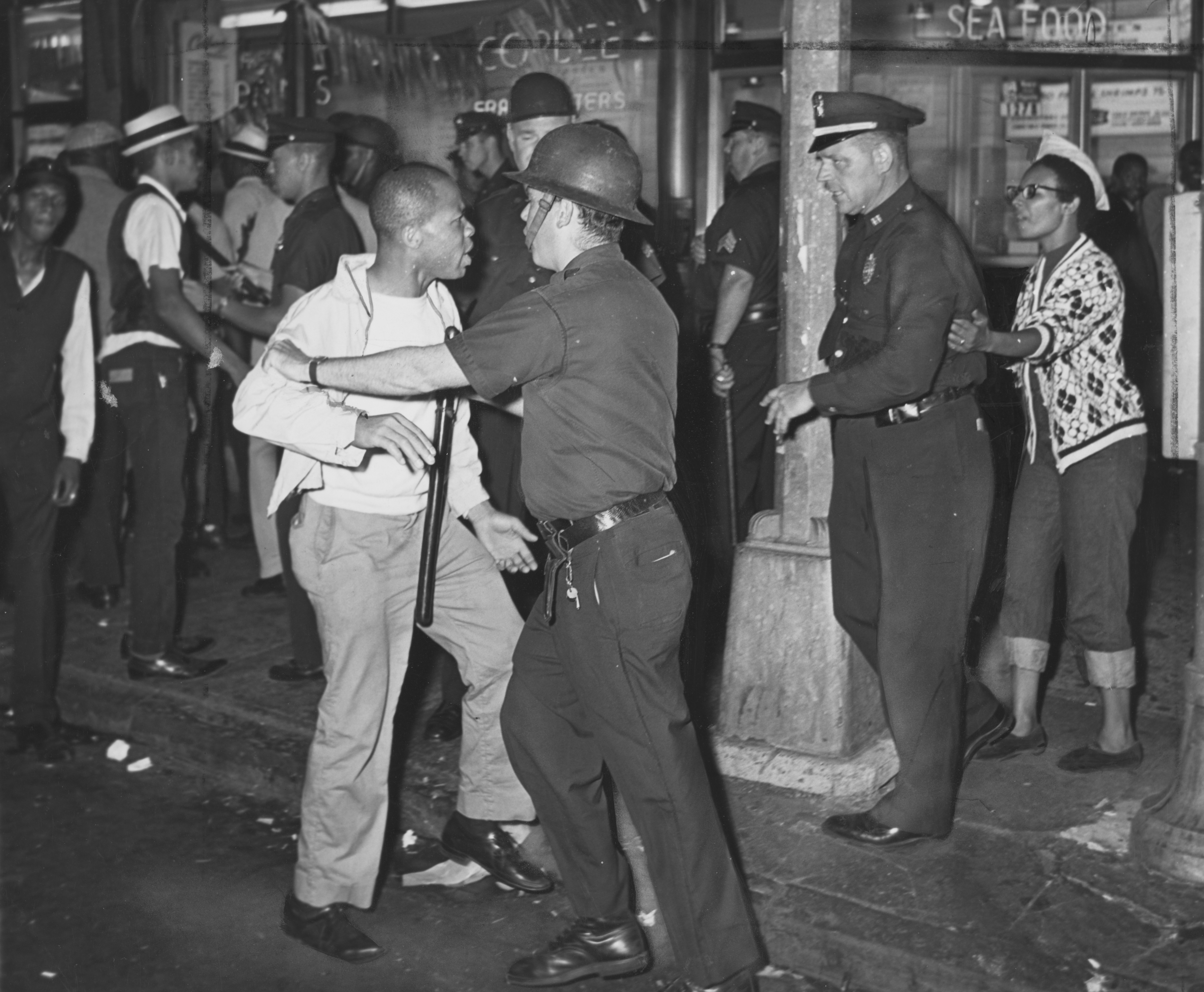
Bedford-Stuyvesant riot of 1964

Year	Population	White (includes White Hispanics)	% W	Non-Hispanic Whites	% ANG	Black	% B	Asian	% A	Other or Mixed	% O/M	Hispanic/ Latino	% H/L	Foreign born	% FB
1900	1,166,582	1,146,909	98.31	N/A	N/A	18,367	1.57	1,300	0.11	6	0	N/A	N/A	355,697	30.49
1910	1,634,351	1,610,487	98.54	N/A	N/A	22,708	1.39	1,010	0.06	146	0.01	N/A	N/A	574,730	35.17
1920	2,018,356	1,984,953	98.35	N/A	N/A	31,912	1.58	1,459	0.07	32	0	N/A	N/A	666,188	33.01
1930	2,560,401	2,488,815	97.20	N/A	N/A	68,921	2.69	2,539	0.10	126	0	N/A	N/A	881,571	34.43
1940	2,698,285	2,587,951	95.91	N/A	N/A	107,263	3.98	2,608	0.10	463	0.02	N/A	N/A	778,054	28.84
1950	2,738,175	2,525,118	92.22	N/A	N/A	208,478	7.61	2,514	0.09	2,065	0.08	N/A	N/A	630,526	23.03
1960	2,627,319	2,245,859	85.48	N/A	N/A	371,405	14.14	6,540	0.25	3,515	0.13	N/A	N/A	516,349	19.65
1970	2,602,012	1,905,788	73.24	N/A	N/A	656,194	25.22	16,138	0.62	23,892	0.92	N/A	N/A	456,636	17.55
1980	2,230,936	1,249,486	56.01	1,085,233	48.64	722,812	32.40	42,965	1.93	215,673	9.67	392,118	17.58	530,973	23.80
1990	2,300,664	1,078,549	46.88	923,229	40.13	872,305	37.92	111,251	4.84	238,559	10.37	462,411	20.10	672,569	29.23
2000	2,465,326	1,015,728	41.20	854,532	34.66	898,350	36.44	187,283	7.60	363,965	14.76	487,878	19.79	931,769	37.79
2010	2,504,700	1,072,041	42.80	893,306	35.67	860,083	34.34	263,519	10.52	309,057	12.34	496,285	19.81	912,793	36.44

=== Manhattan ===
The demographic landscape of Manhattan has shifted considerably over the past century. In 1900, the borough was overwhelmingly White, with a White population that constituted 97.78% of the total, while Black residents made up only 1.96%. Over the subsequent decades, the proportion of White residents gradually decreased, falling to 94.96% in 1920 and then more sharply to 87.47% in 1930. The Black population simultaneously grew to 12.03% in 1930.

From the 1940s through the 1960s, the decline in the White population continued, with percentages dropping to 79.41% in 1950 and 74.89% in 1960. During this period, the Black population increased to nearly one-quarter of the total, reaching 23.38% in 1960. Additionally, the Asian population began to grow, reaching 1.50% in 1960.

The 1970s and 1980s marked a significant transformation in Manhattan's racial composition. The White population fell below 60%, reaching 58.90% in 1980, while the Black population stabilized around 20-25%. The Asian community continued to grow, reaching 5.10% in 1980, and the Other or Mixed category emerged as a more substantial portion of the population, making up 14.31% in 1980. The Hispanic/Latino community also became more prominent, growing to 23.54% in 1980.

In recent decades, from 1990 to 2010, the racial diversity in Manhattan has continued to expand. The White population remained around 57-58%, while the Black population fluctuated around 15-17%. The Asian population grew to 11.38% by 2010, and the Other or Mixed category increased to 15.62%. The Hispanic/Latino population remained significant, at 25.45% in 2010, and the foreign-born population has been consistently high, reaching 29.66% in 2010.

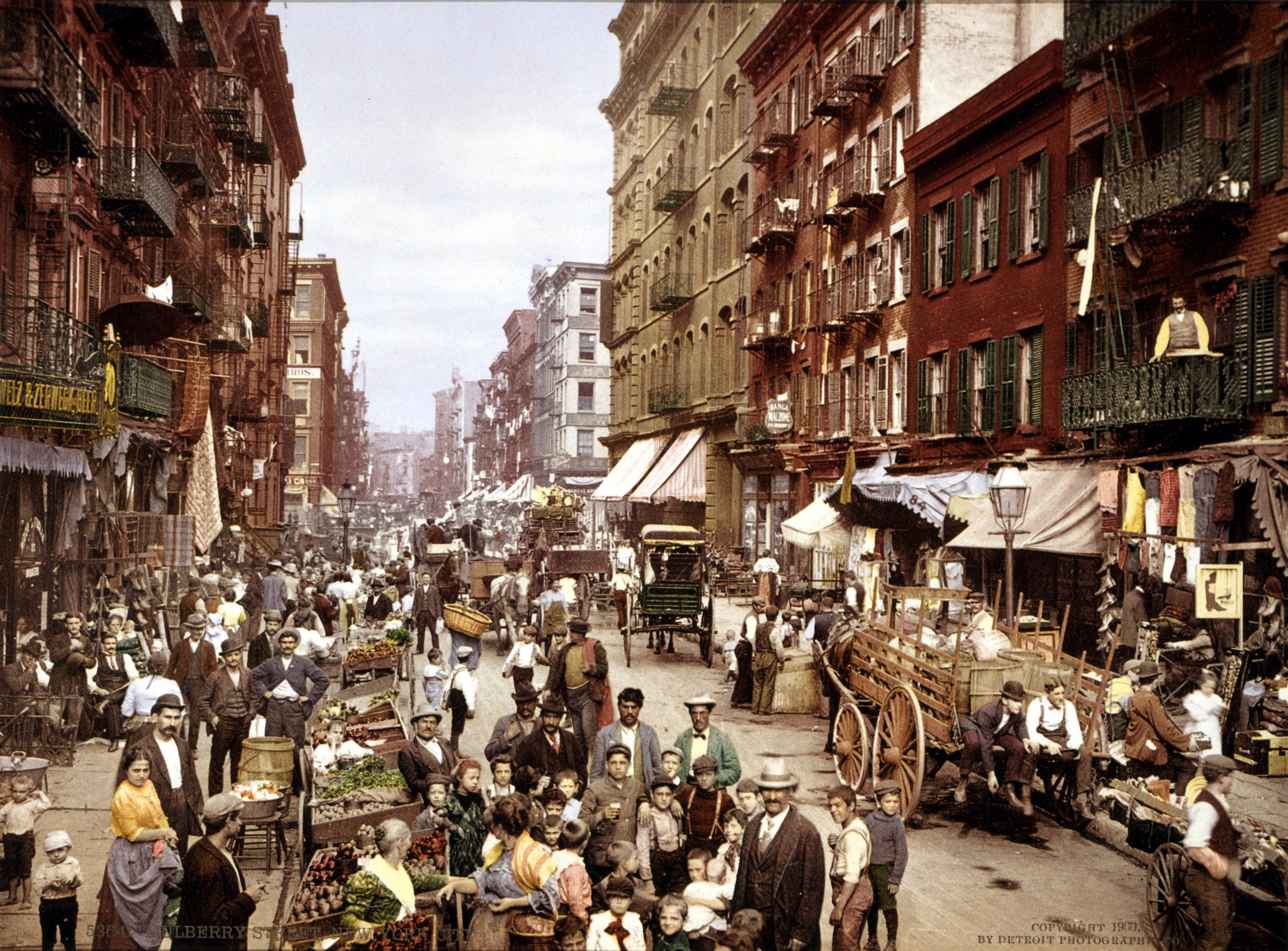
Little Italy in Manhattan c.1900

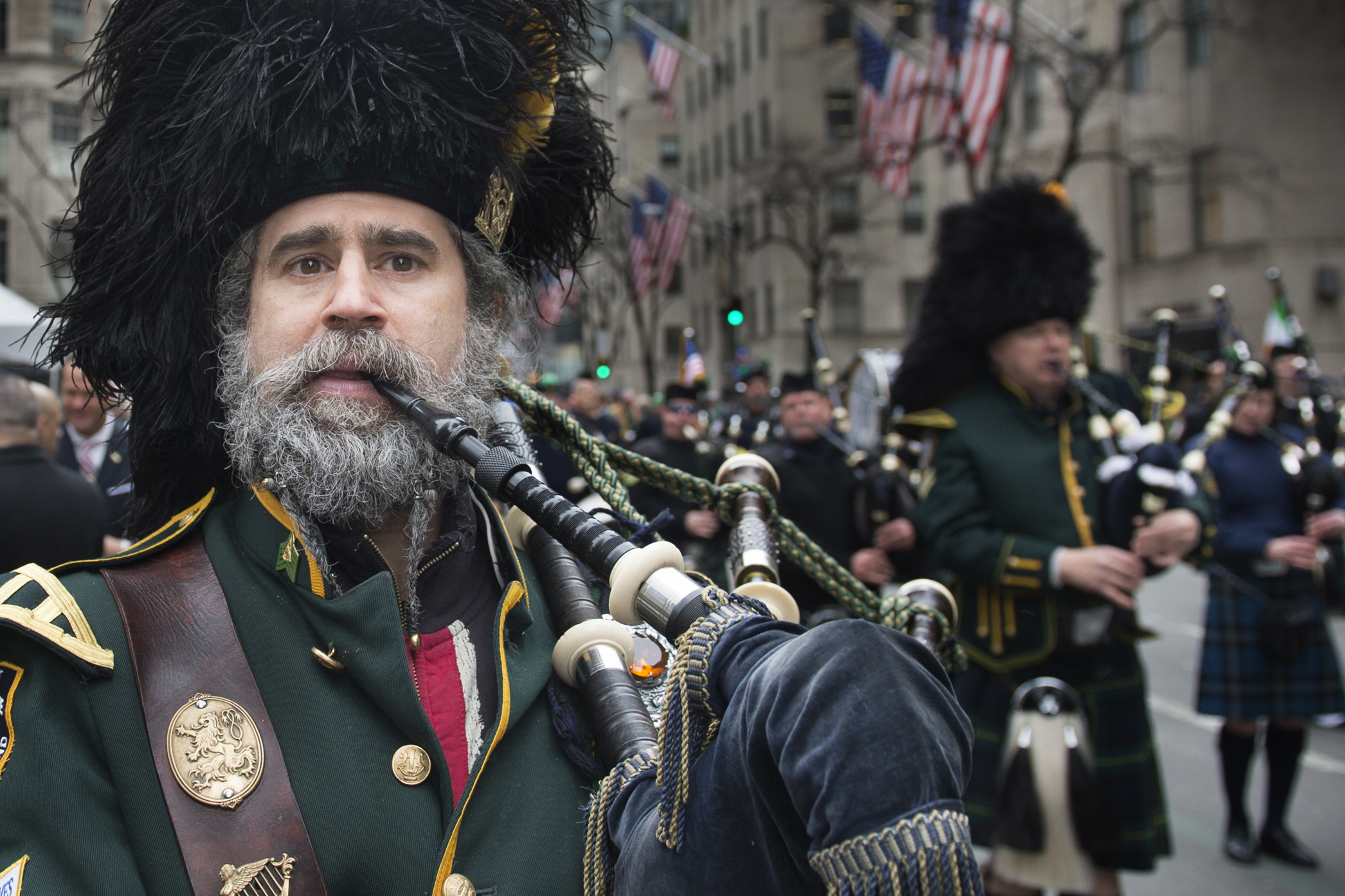
St. Patrick's Day Parade

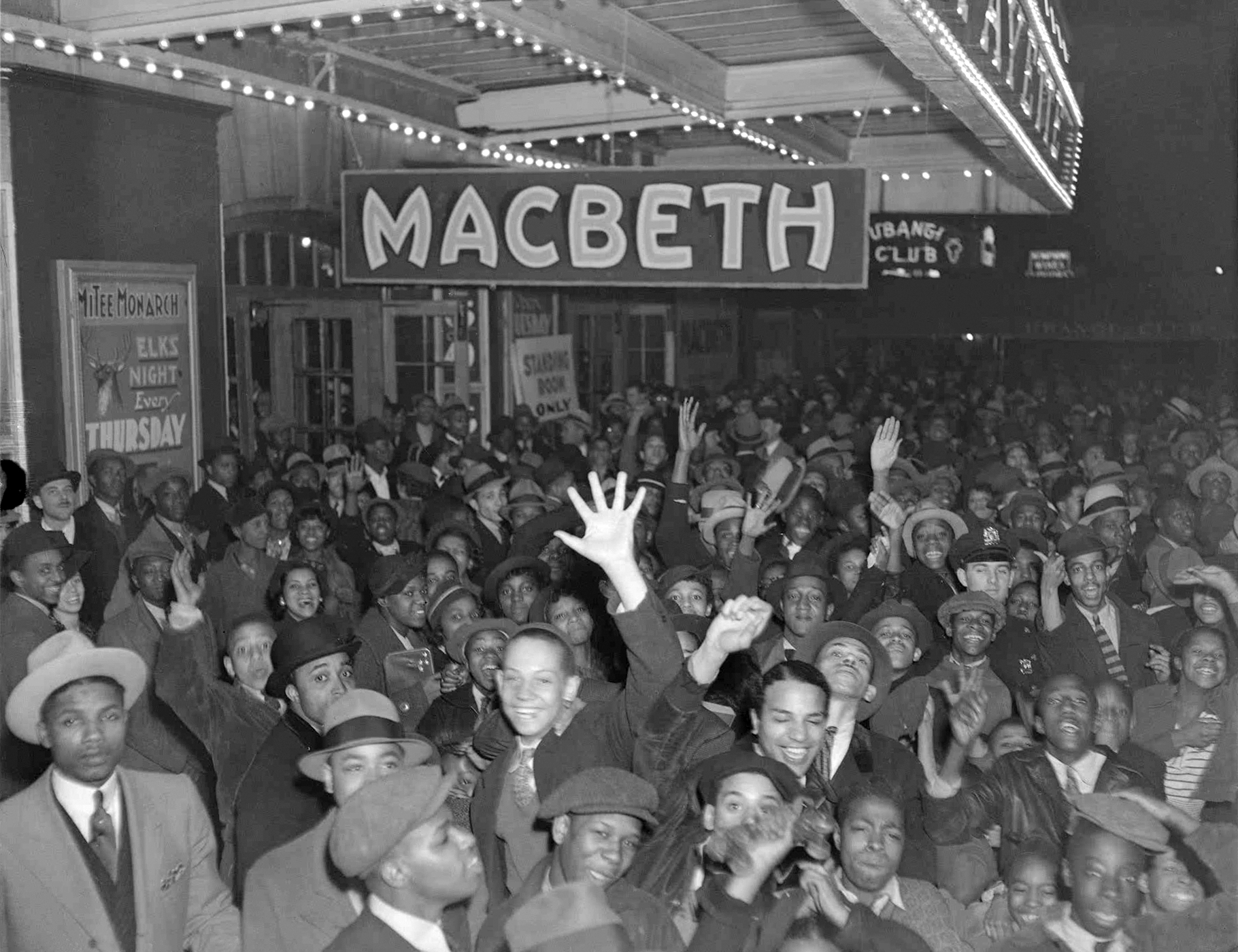
Lafayette Theatre in Harlem

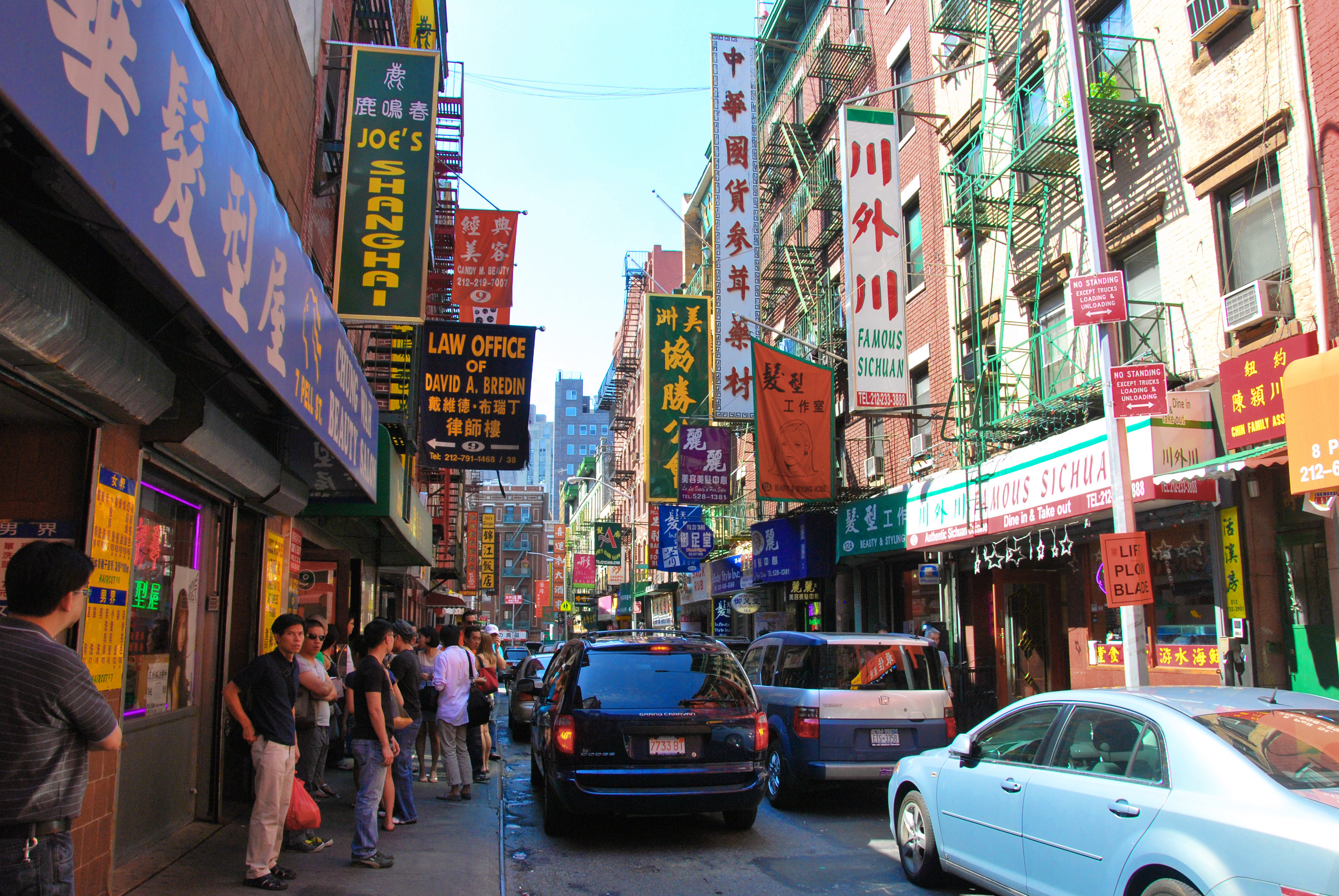
Chinatown, Manhattan

Year	Population	White (includes White Hispanics)	% W	Non-Hispanic Whites	% ANG	Black	% B	Asian	% A	Other or Mixed	% O/M	Hispanic/ Latino	% H/L	Foreign born	% FB
1900	1,850,093	1,808,968	97.78	N/A	N/A	36,246	1.96	4,861	0.26	18	0	N/A	N/A	789,626	42.68
1910	2,331,542	2,266,578	97.21	N/A	N/A	60,534	2.60	4,260	0.18	170	0.01	N/A	N/A	1,116,477	47.89
1920	2,284,103	2,168,906	94.96	N/A	N/A	109,133	4.78	6,003	0.26	61	0	N/A	N/A	950,264	41.60
1930	1,867,312	1,633,329	87.47	N/A	N/A	224,670	12.03	9,124	0.49	189	0.01	N/A	N/A	689,506	36.93
1940	1,889,924	1,577,625	83.48	N/A	N/A	298,365	15.79	13,467	0.71	467	0.02	N/A	N/A	582,895	30.84
1950	1,960,101	1,556,599	79.41	N/A	N/A	384,482	19.62	16,083	0.82	2,937	0.15	N/A	N/A	461,102	23.52
1960	1,698,281	1,271,822	74.89	N/A	N/A	397,101	23.38	25,487	1.50	3,871	0.23	N/A	N/A	374,698	22.06
1970	1,539,233	1,089,302	70.77	N/A	N/A	380,442	24.72	47,332	3.08	22,157	1.44	N/A	N/A	307,630	19.99
1980	1,428,285	841,204	58.90	713,854	49.98	309,854	21.69	72,884	5.10	204,343	14.31	336,247	23.54	348,581	24.41
1990	1,487,536	867,227	58.30	726,755	48.86	326,967	21.98	110,629	7.44	182,713	12.28	386,630	25.99	383,866	25.81
2000	1,537,195	835,610	54.36	703,873	45.79	267,302	17.39	145,607	9.47	288,676	18.78	417,816	27.18	452,440	29.43
2010	1,585,873	911,073	57.45	761,493	48.02	246,687	15.55	180,425	11.38	247,688	15.62	403,577	25.45	470,305	29.66

=== Queens ===
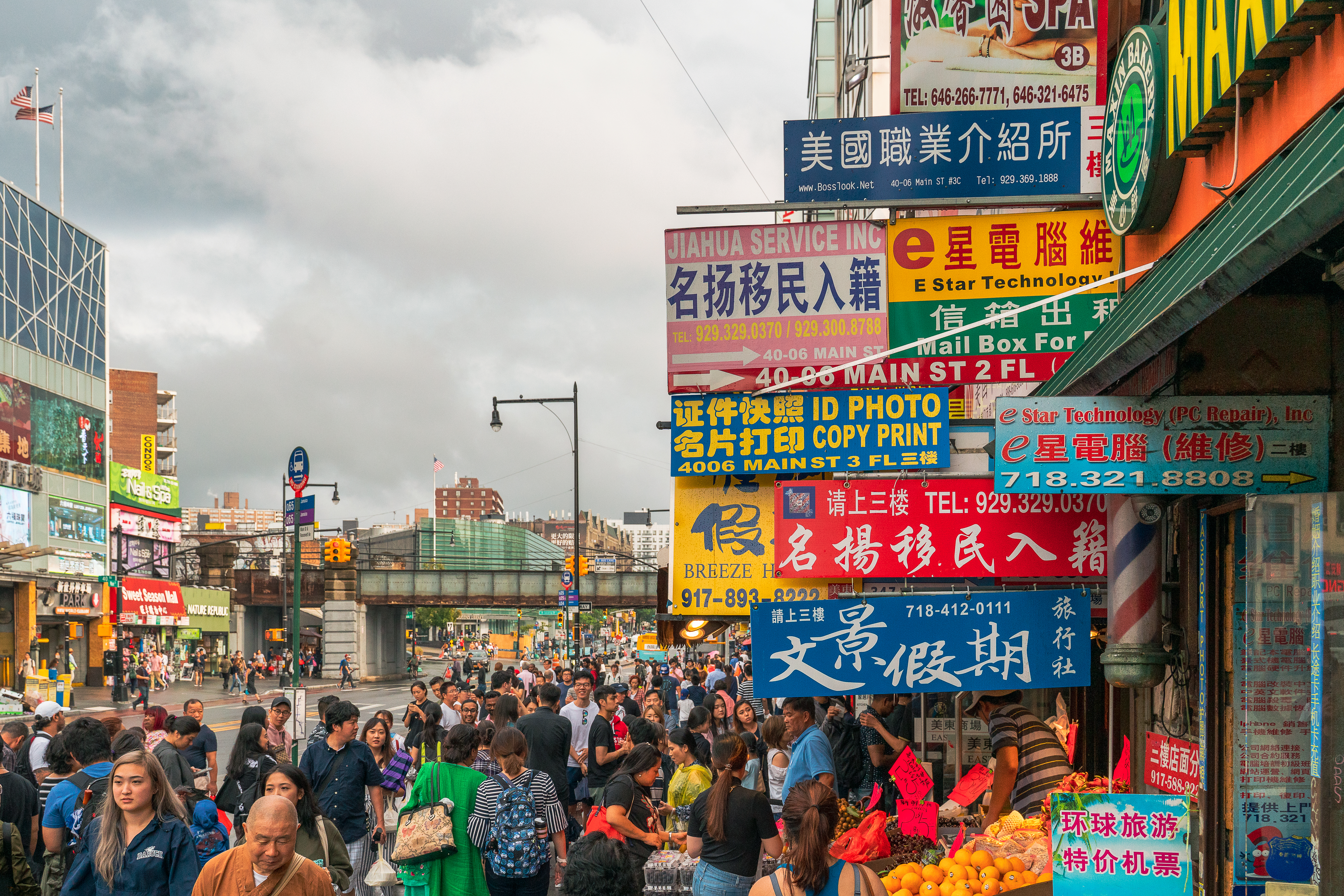
Main Street, Chinatown, Flushing

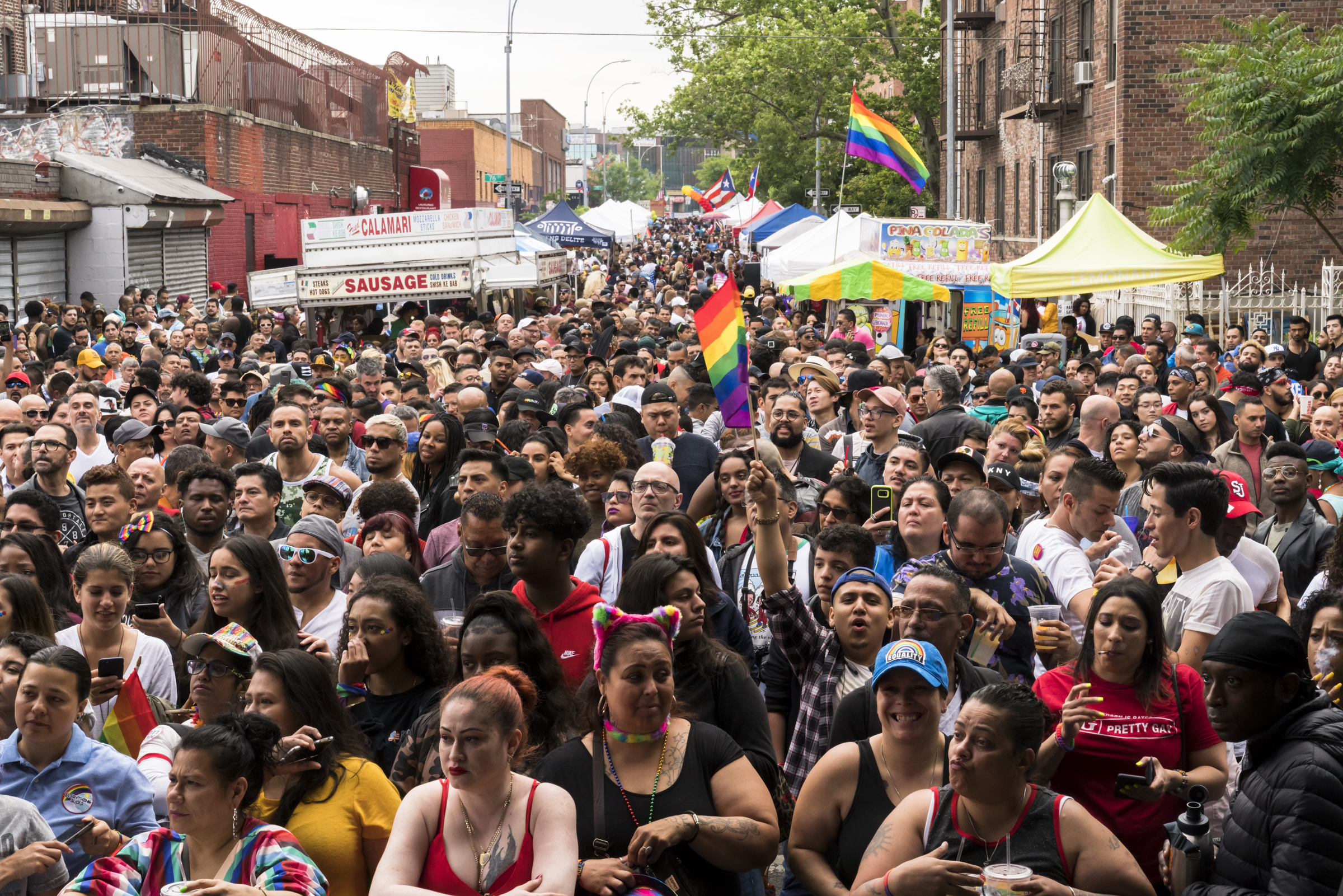
Queens Pride Parade and Multicultural Festival

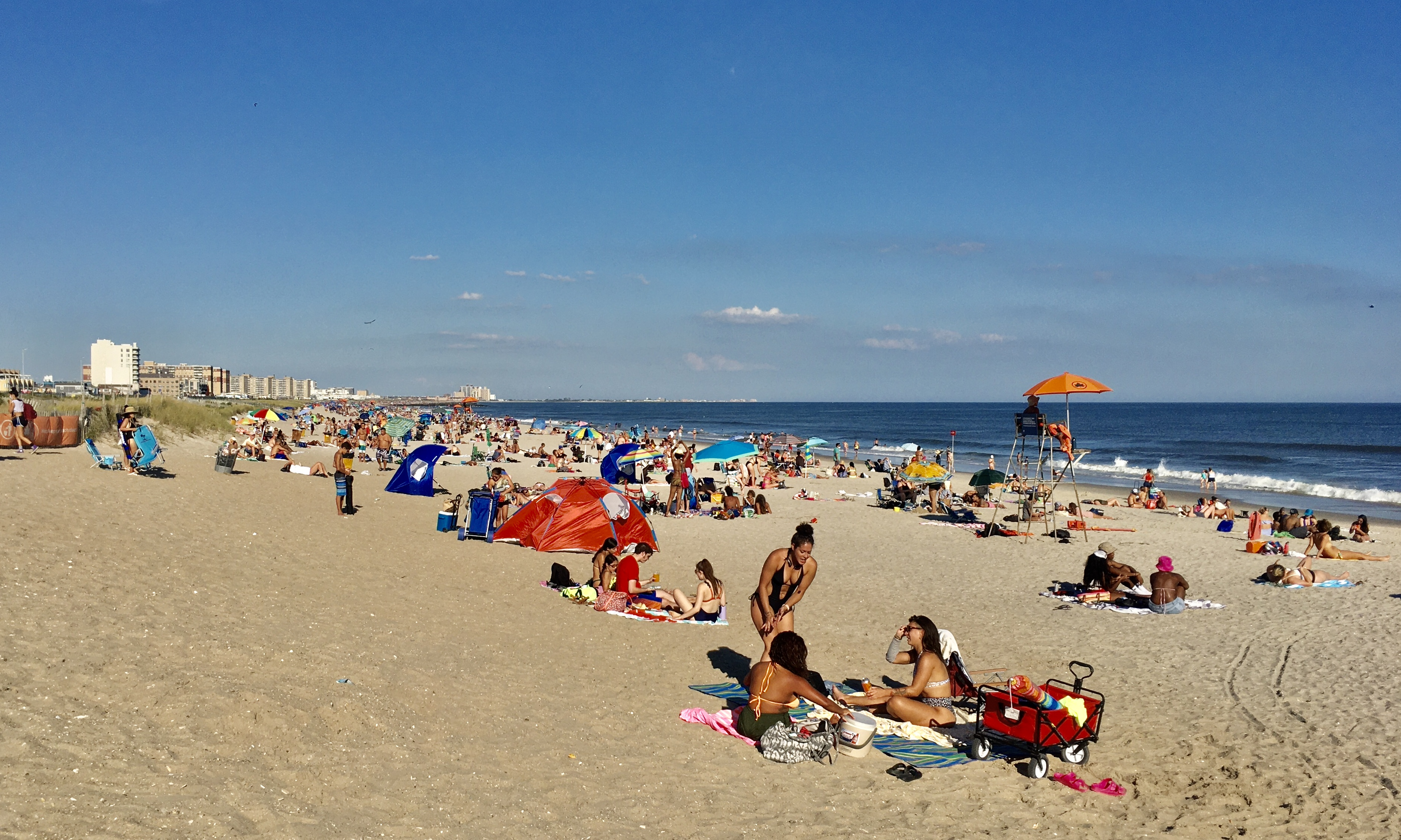
Sunbathers at Rockaway Beach

Year	Population	White (includes White Hispanics)	% W	Non-Hispanic Whites	% ANG	Black	% B	Asian	% A	Other or Mixed	% O/M	Hispanic/ Latino	% H/L	Foreign born	% FB
1900	152,999	150,235	98.19	N/A	N/A	2,611	1.71	152	0.10	1	0	N/A	N/A	44,812	29.29
1910	284,041	280,691	98.82	N/A	N/A	3,198	1.13	149	0.05	3	0	N/A	N/A	79,329	27.93
1920	469,042	463,661	98.85	N/A	N/A	5,120	1.09	214	0.05	47	0.01	N/A	N/A	112,171	23.91
1930	1,079,129	1,059,804	98.21	N/A	N/A	18,609	1.72	679	0.06	37	0	N/A	N/A	268,358	24.87
1940	1,297,634	1,270,731	97.93	N/A	N/A	25,890	2.00	947	0.07	66	0.01	N/A	N/A	278,937	21.50
1950	1,550,849	1,497,126	96.54	N/A	N/A	51,524	3.32	1,444	0.09	755	0.05	N/A	N/A	288,197	18.58
1960	1,809,578	1,654,959	91.46	N/A	N/A	145,855	8.06	7,084	0.39	1,680	0.09	N/A	N/A	335,623	18.55
1970	1,986,473	1,695,288	85.34	N/A	N/A	258,006	12.99	21,940	1.10	11,239	0.57	N/A	N/A	416,887	20.99
1980	1,891,325	1,335,805	70.63	1,172,511	61.99	354,129	18.72	93,780	4.96	107,611	5.69	262,422	13.88	540,818	28.59
1990	1,951,598	1,129,192	57.86	937,557	48.04	423,211	21.69	238,336	12.21	160,859	8.24	381,120	19.53	707,153	36.23
2000	2,229,379	982,725	44.08	732,895	32.87	446,189	20.01	392,831	17.62	407,634	18.28	556,605	24.97	1,028,339	46.13
2010	2,230,722	1,060,000	45.72	616,727	27.65	426,683	19.13	513,317	23.01	404,669	18.14	613,750	27.51	1,059,593	47.50

=== Staten Island ===
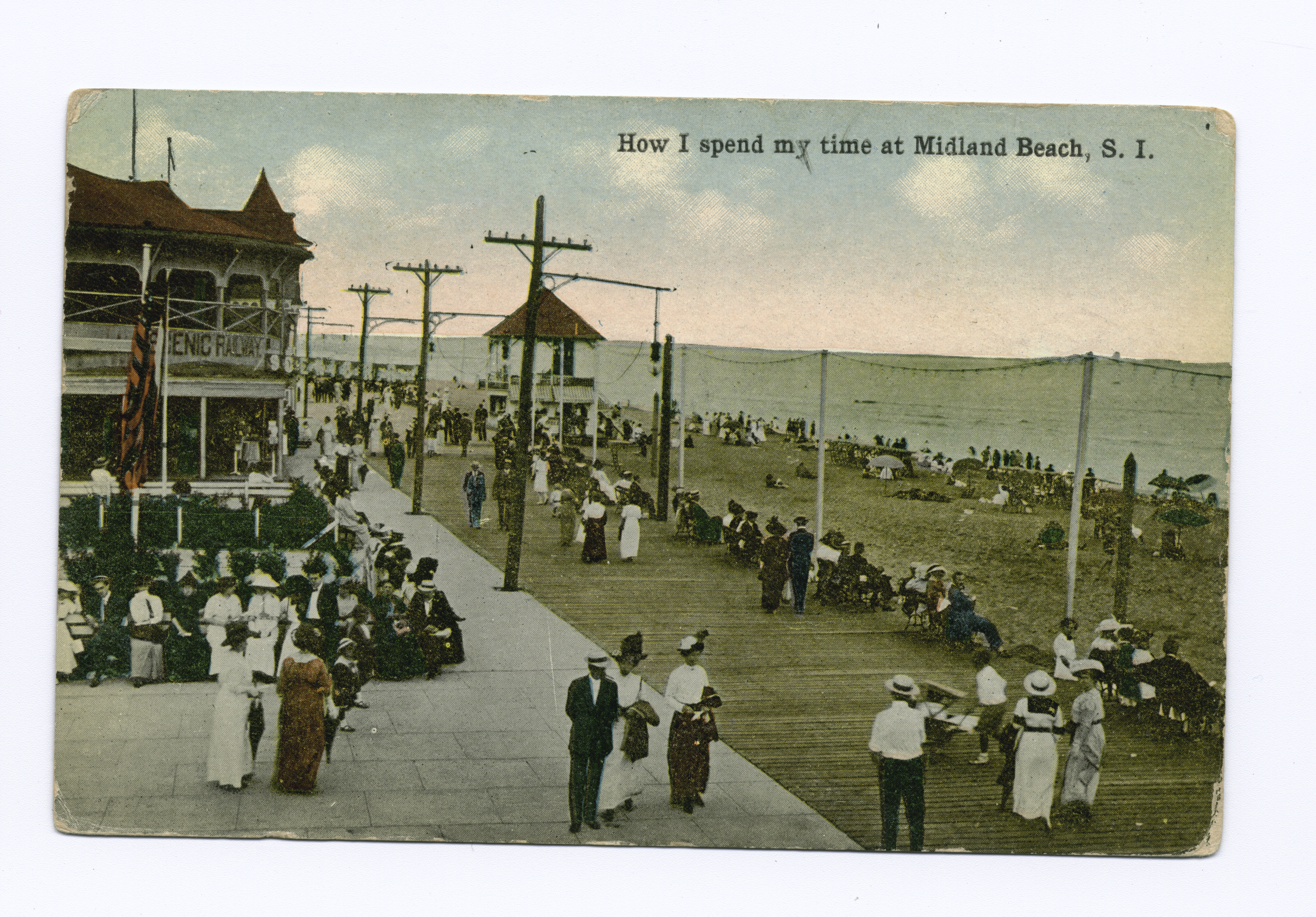
Midland Beach

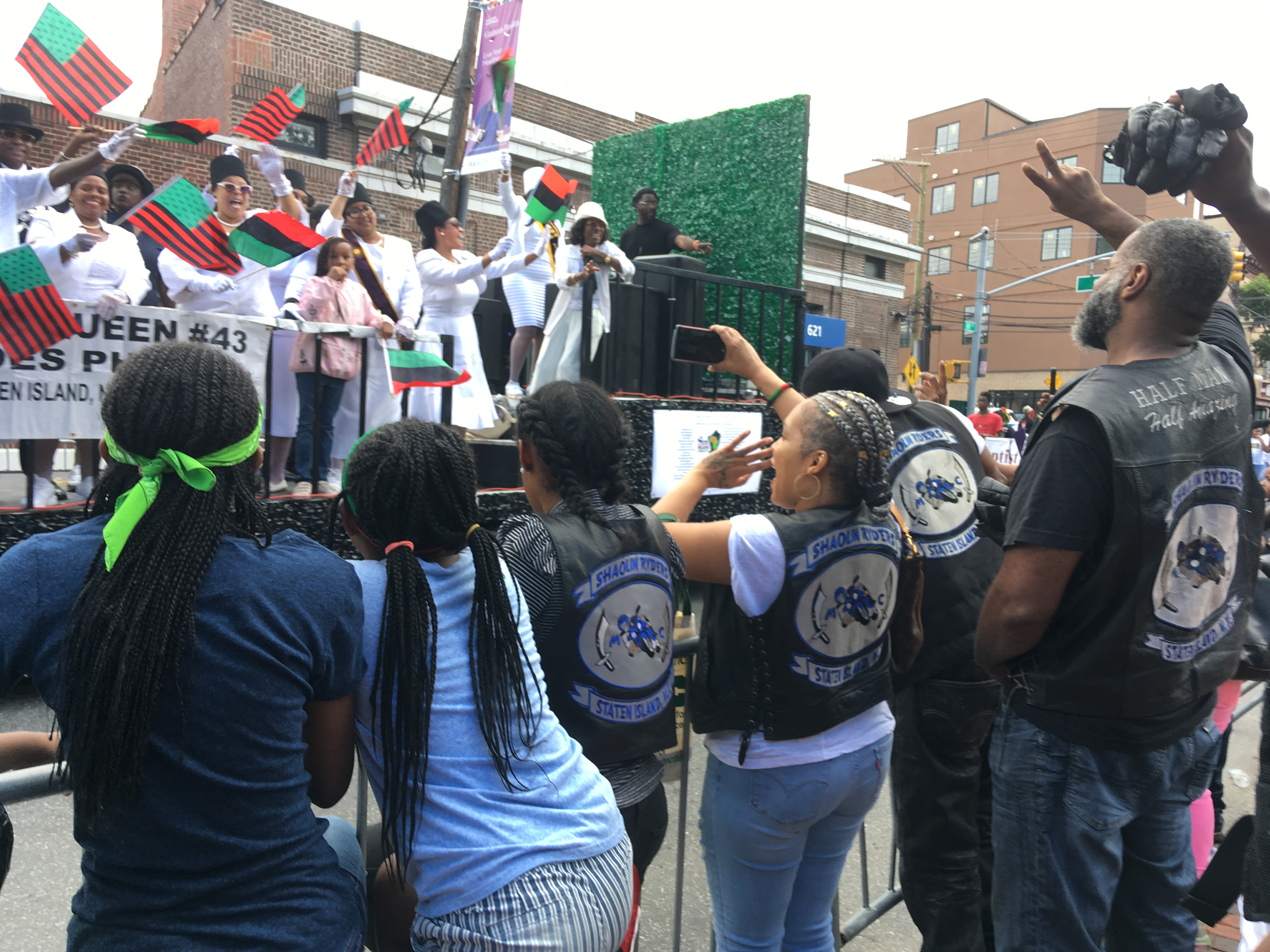
Staten Island Black Heritage Festival

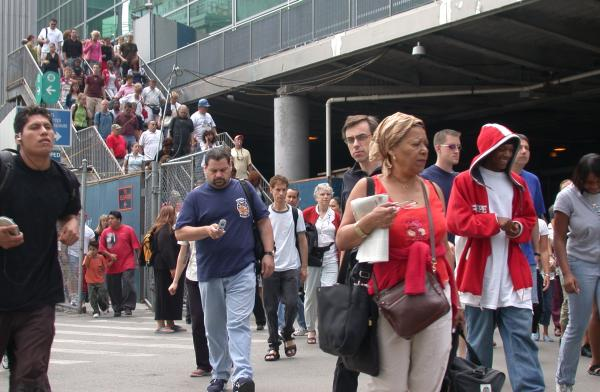
Commuters on the Staten Island Ferry

Year	Population	White (includes White Hispanics)	% W	Non-Hispanic Whites	% ANG	Black	% B	Asian	% A	Other or Mixed	% O/M	Hispanic/ Latino	% H/L	Foreign born	% FB
1900	67,021	65,863	98.27	N/A	N/A	1,072	1.60	86	0.13	0	0	N/A	N/A	18,687	27.88
1910	85,969	84,756	98.59	N/A	N/A	1,152	1.34	61	0.07	0	0	N/A	N/A	24,394	28.38
1920	116,531	114,953	98.65	N/A	N/A	1,499	1.29	78	0.07	1	0	N/A	N/A	31,795	27.28
1930	158,346	155,606	98.27	N/A	N/A	2,576	1.63	154	0.10	10	0.01	N/A	N/A	39,799	25.13
1940	174,441	170,875	97.96	N/A	N/A	3,397	1.95	163	0.09	6	0	N/A	N/A	35,318	20.25
1950	191,555	185,936	97.07	N/A	N/A	5,372	2.80	153	0.08	94	0.05	N/A	N/A	30,487	15.92
1960	221,991	211,738	95.38	N/A	N/A	9,674	4.36	448	0.20	131	0.06	N/A	N/A	25,428	11.45
1970	295,443	277,604	93.96	N/A	N/A	15,792	5.35	1,297	0.44	750	0.25	N/A	N/A	26,695	9.04
1980	352,121	313,534	89.04	300,511	85.34	25,616	7.27	6,709	1.91	6,262	1.78	18,884	5.36	34,514	9.80
1990	378,977	322,043	84.98	303,081	79.97	30,630	8.08	16,941	4.47	9,363	2.47	30,239	7.98	44,550	11.76
2000	443,728	344,319	77.60	316,316	71.29	42,914	9.67	25,253	5.69	31,242	7.04	53,550	12.07	72,657	16.37
2010	468,730	341,677	72.89	300,169	64.04	49,857	10.64	35,377	7.55	41,819	8.92	81,051	17.29	110,142	23.50

== See also ==
- Demographics of New York City
