= Timeline of labor in New York City =

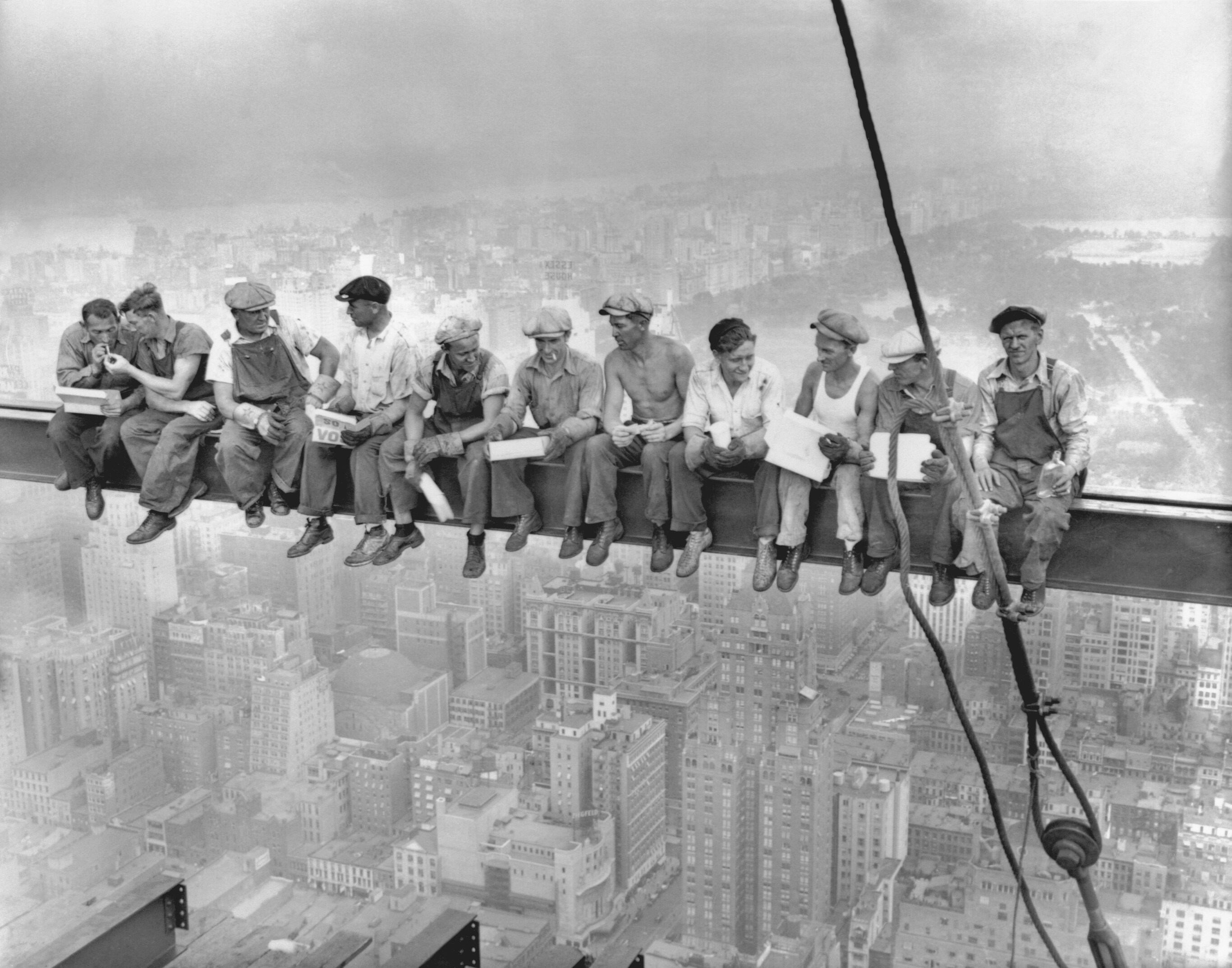
Lunch atop a Skyscraper, 1932

The following is a timeline of labor in New York City from the prehistory of New York City covering the labor of the precolonial era, when the area of present-day New York City was inhabited by Algonquian Native Americans, including the Lenape, to the colonial era, under the Dutch and English, to the American Revolution to modern day New York City.

== Prehistory ==
- Algonquian communities practiced agriculture, hunting and fishing to sustain themselves.

== 17th century ==
- 1657: Burgher rights
- 1659: Baker's strike, concessions
- 1661: Baker's strike, suppressed
- 1677: Carter's strike and prosecution "for not obeying the Command and Doing their Dutyes as becomes them in their Places"
- 1684: Carter's strike in context of Leisler's Rebellion

== 18th century ==
- 1712: New York Slave Revolt of 1712
- 1741: Baker's strike
- 1741: New York Conspiracy of 1741
- 1768: Journeymen printers strike for "three shillings and six pence per day with diet"

== 19th century ==
- 1805: Journeymen Cordwainers, cf. Commonwealth v. Pullis
- 1825: United Tailoresses of New York
- 1827: Abolition of slavery
- 1829: Working Men's Party of New York
- 1833: General Trades Union
- 1836:
- 1849: Astor Place Riot
  National Cooperative Association of Cordwainers
  Tailor's strike
- 1863: New York City draft riots
- 1867: New York Central Labor Union
- 1874: Tompkins Square Park riot
- 1882: Labor Day
- 1886: United Labor Party
- 1899: Newsboys' strike

== 20th century ==
- 1900: NYC District Council of Carpenters formed
- 1900: International Ladies Garment Workers Union formed
- 1901: Newspaper and Mail Deliverers Union formed
- 1904: National Child Labor Committee formed
- 1906: Guild of Bookworkers established
- 1909: New York shirtwaist strike of 1909
- 1911: Triangle Shirtwaist Factory fire
- 1911-1927: Labor Slugger Wars
- 1912: Authors Guild founded as the Authors League of America
- 1913: Actors' Equity Association
- 1915: Bagel Bakers Local 338
- 1916: Teachers Union
- 1932: 1199: The National Health Care Workers' Union
- 1933-1942: Artists Union
- 1935: Negro Labor Committee
- 1936: American Labor Party
- 1936: Negro Actors Guild of America formed
- 1937: New York City department store strikes
- 1944: District Council 37
- 1945: Newspaper and Mail Deliverers Union strike
- 1946: New York City tugboat strike of 1946
- 1949: Calvary Cemetery strike
- 1949: New York City brewery strike
- 1949: New York City taxicab strike
- 1953: Waterfront Commission of New York Harbor
- 1959: New York City Central Labor Council founded
- 1960: United Federation of Teachers representing most teachers in New York City public schools is founded
- 1962–1963: New York City newspaper strike
- 1966: New York City transit strike
- 1967: Taylor Law
- 1968: New York City teachers' strike of 1968
- 1970: Lincoln Hospital takeover
- 1972: Professional Staff Congress, a trade union representing faculty of the City University of New York campuses, is founded
- 1977: SEIU 32BJ
- 1978: New York City newspaper strike
- 1980: New York City transit strike
- 1982: Garment workers' strike
- 1985: UAW Local 2110
- 1992: Patrolmen's Benevolent Association Riot
- 1998: Working Families Party

- 1199SEIU United Healthcare Workers East
- National Taxi Workers' Alliance
- Graduate Student Organizing Committee

== 21st century ==
- Verizon strike of 2000
- 2005: New York City transit strike
- 2011: Occupy Wall Street
- 2012: Fight for $15
- 2017: Bodega strike
- 2019: Amazon HQ2 cancelled
- 2021: Amazon Labor Union
- 2021–2022: Columbia University strike

== See also ==
- Labor history of the United States
- Timeline of New York City
