= Demographics of New York City =

- Population pyramid of New York City in 2021
- Population: 8,260,000 (2023 est.)

New York City, with a Census-estimated population of 8,584,629 in July 2025, is a large and ethnically diverse metropolis. It is the largest city in the United States, and has a long history of international immigration. The New York region continues to be by far the leading metropolitan gateway for legal immigrants admitted into the United States. The city is the geographical and demographic center of both the Northeast megalopolis and the New York metropolitan area, the largest metropolitan area in the U.S. by both population and urban area. With over 20.1 million people in its metropolitan statistical area and 23.5 million in its combined statistical area as of 2020, New York City is one of the world's most populous megacities.

The city and its metropolitan area are the premier gateway for legal immigration to the United States. New York City enforces a right-to-shelter law guaranteeing shelter to anyone who needs shelter, regardless of their immigration status; and the city is home to more than 3.2 million residents born outside the U.S., the largest foreign-born population of any city in the world as of 2011.

Throughout its history, New York City has been a major point of entry for immigrants; the term "melting pot" was coined to describe densely populated immigrant neighborhoods on the Lower East Side. As many as 800 languages are spoken in New York, making it the most linguistically diverse city in the world. English remains the most widely spoken language, although there are areas in the outer boroughs in which up to 25% of people speak English as an alternate language, and/or have limited or no English language fluency. English is least spoken in neighborhoods such as Flushing, Sunset Park, and Corona.

New York's two key demographic features are its density and diversity. It is often regarded as one of the most diverse major cities in both the US, and the world, with significant populations of European, Caribbean, Latin American, African, Asian and Middle Eastern Americans all having a major presence within the city and its metropolitan area. The city has an extremely high population density of 26,403 people per square mile (10,194/km^{2}), about 10,000 more people per square mile than the next densest large American city, San Francisco. Manhattan's population density is 66,940 people per square mile (25,846/km^{2}). The city has a long tradition of attracting international immigration and Americans seeking careers in certain sectors. As of 2006, New York City has ranked number one for seven consecutive years as the city most U.S. residents would most like to live in or near.

== Demographic profile ==
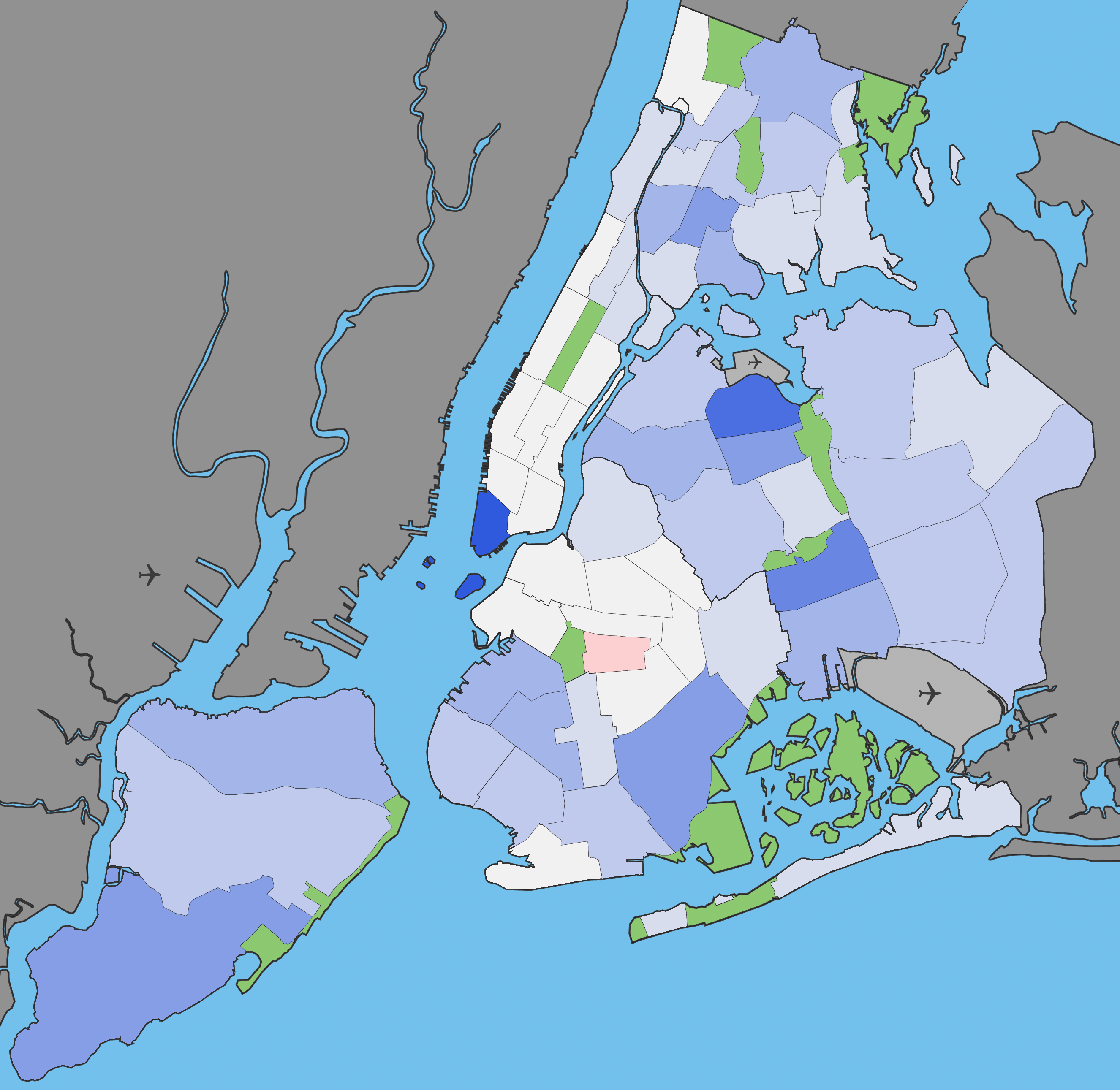
Population growth (blue) and population loss (red) from 1990 to 2000. (Click on image to see full key and data.)

Historical population
Year	Pop.	±%
1698	4,937	—
1712	5,840	+18.3%
1723	7,248	+24.1%
1737	10,664	+47.1%
1746	11,717	+9.9%
1756	13,046	+11.3%
1771	21,863	+67.6%
1790	33,131	+51.5%
1800	60,515	+82.7%
1810	96,373	+59.3%
1820	123,706	+28.4%
1830	202,589	+63.8%
1840	312,710	+54.4%
1850	515,547	+64.9%
1860	813,669	+57.8%
1870	942,292	+15.8%
1880	1,206,299	+28.0%
1890	1,515,301	+25.6%
1900	3,437,202	+126.8%
1910	4,766,883	+38.7%
1920	5,620,048	+17.9%
1930	6,930,446	+23.3%
1940	7,454,995	+7.6%
1950	7,891,957	+5.9%
1960	7,781,984	−1.4%
1970	7,894,862	+1.5%
1980	7,071,639	−10.4%
1990	7,322,564	+3.5%
2000	8,008,288	+9.4%
2010	8,175,133	+2.1%
2020	8,804,190	+7.7%
2023 est.	8,260,000	−6.2%
1880 & 1890 figures include part of the Bronx. Beginning with 1900, figures are for consolidated city of five boroughs. For the same area before 1900, see #Historical population data, below. Sources: 1698–1771, 1790–1990, 2000 and 2010 Censuses, 2020 Census, and 2023 estimate

New York City is the most populous city in the United States, with an estimated 8,804,190 people living in the city, according to the 2020 U.S. Census (up from 8,175,133 in 2010; 8.0 million in 2000; and 7.3 million in 1990). This amounts to about 44% of New York State's population and a similar percentage of the metropolitan regional population. New York's two key demographic features are its population density and cultural diversity. The city's population density of 29,091.3 people per square mile (11,232/km^{2}), makes it the densest of any American municipality with a population above 100,000. Manhattan's population density is 74,781 people per square mile (28,872/km^{2}), highest of any county in the United States.

New York City is multicultural. About 37% of the city's population was foreign-born in 2011, the highest among US cities. The eleven nations constituting the largest sources of modern immigration to New York City are the Dominican Republic, China, Jamaica, Guyana, Mexico, Ecuador, Brazil, Haiti, Trinidad and Tobago, Colombia, Russia and El Salvador.

New York is the largest city in the United States, with the city proper's population more than double the next largest city, Los Angeles (or roughly equivalent to the combined populations of Los Angeles, Chicago, and Houston, the United States' second, third, and fourth most populous cities respectively). In 2006, demographers estimated New York's population would reach 9.1 million by 2030. In 2000 the reported life expectancy of New Yorkers was above the national average. Life expectancy for females born in 2009 in New York City is 80.2 years and for males is 74.5 years.

=== Households ===
The 2000 census counted 2,021,588 households with a median income of $38,293. 30% of households had children under the age of 18, and 37% were married couples living together. 19% had a single female householder, and 39% were non-families. 32% of all households were made up of individuals, and 10% were single residents 65 years of age or older. The average household size was 2.59 persons, and the average family size was 3.32.

% population by age range
Age range	2000 Census
Under the age of 18	24%
Between 18 and 24	10%
Between 25 and 44	33%
Between 45 and 64	21%
Aged 65 or older	12%

The median age in New York City in 2000 was 34 years. For every 100 females, there were 90 males. For every 100 females age 18 and over, there were 86 males.

During the 2000s, Manhattan experienced a "baby boom" unique among U.S. cities. Between 2000 and 2007, the number of children under age 5 living in Manhattan grew by more than 32%. The increase is driven mostly by affluent white families with median household incomes over $300,000.

=== Income ===
Overall, nominal household income in New York City is characterized by large variations. This phenomenon is especially true of Manhattan, which in 2005 was home to the highest incomes U.S. census tract, with a household income of $188,697, as well as the lowest, where household income was $9,320. The disparity is driven in part by wage growth in high income brackets. In 2006 the average weekly wage in Manhattan was $1,453, the highest among the largest counties in the United States. Wages in Manhattan were the fastest growing among the nation's 10 largest counties. Among young adults in New York who work full-time, women now earn more money than men — approximately $5,000 more in 2005.

New York City's borough of Manhattan is the highest nominal income county in the United States. In particular, ZIP code 10021 on Manhattan's Upper East Side, with more than 100,000 inhabitants and a per capita income of over $90,000, has one of the largest concentrations of income in the United States. The other boroughs, especially Queens and Staten Island, have large middle-class populations. New York City's per capita income in 2000 was $22,402; men and women had a median income of $37,435 and $32,949 respectively. 21.2% of the population and 18.5% of families had incomes below the federal poverty line; 30.0% of this group were under the age of 18 and 17.8% were 65 and older. Of Forbes Magazine's 400 richest American billionaires, 70 live in New York City. Former mayor and Presidential candidate Michael Bloomberg is one of the nation's richest men. As of 2009 New York has regained the number one spot as the city with most billionaires (55), after losing out to Moscow in 2008.

In 2000, about 3 out of every 10 New York City housing units were owner-occupied, compared to about 2 owner-occupied units out of every 3 units in the U.S. as a whole. Rental vacancy is usually between 3% and 4.5%, well below the 5% threshold defined to be a housing emergency, justifying the continuation of rent control and rent stabilization. About 33% of rental units fall under rent stabilization, according to which increases are adjudicated periodically by city agencies. Rent control covers only a very small number of rental units. Some critics point to New York City's strict zoning and other regulations as partial causes for the housing shortage, but during the city's decline in population from the 1960s through the 1980s, a large number of apartment buildings suffered suspected arson fires or were abandoned by their owners. Once the population trend was reversed, with rising prospects for rentals and sales, new construction has resumed, but generally for purchasers in higher income brackets.

==== Income and poverty by borough ====
Area	Median Household Income	Per Capita Income	Percentage in Poverty
The Bronx	$47,036	$25,845	27.6%
Brooklyn	$74,692	$43,165	19.8%
Manhattan	$99,880	$89,702	17.2%
Queens	$82,431	$39,201	13.1%
Staten Island	$96,185	$43,199	11.2%
New York City	$76,607	$48,066	17.2%
New York State	$81,386	$47,173	14.3%
United States	$75,149	$41,261	11.5%

=== Boroughs ===
1. Manhattan (New York County); 2. Brooklyn (Kings County); 3. Queens (Queens County); 4. The Bronx (Bronx County); 5. Staten Island (Richmond County); Note: JFK and LGA airports, marked in brown, are located in Queens.

New York City is made up of five governmental districts named boroughs: The Bronx, Brooklyn, Manhattan, Queens, and Staten Island. Each borough is coextensive with a respective county of New York state: The Bronx is Bronx County; Brooklyn is Kings County; Manhattan is New York County; Queens is Queens County; and Staten Island is Richmond County.

All five boroughs came into existence with the creation of modern New York City in 1898, when New York County (then including the Bronx), Kings County, Richmond County, and part of Queens County were consolidated within one municipal government under a new city charter. All former municipalities within the newly consolidated city were dissolved.

The City of New York began in lower Manhattan and grew to encompass Manhattan Island and the smaller surrounding islands that formed New York County. The city and county continued to grow northward, annexing areas on the mainland, absorbing territory from Westchester County in 1874 (West Bronx) and in 1895 (East Bronx). During the 1898 consolidation, this mainland territory was organized as the Borough of the Bronx, though still part of New York County. In 1914, Bronx County was separated from New York County so that each borough was then coterminous with a county.

When the western part of Queens County was consolidated with New York City in 1898, that area became the Borough of Queens. In 1899, the eastern section of Queens County was separated to form Nassau County, making the borough and county of Queens coextensive.

New York City's five boroughs
Jurisdiction		Population	Land area		Density of population		GDP
Borough	County	Census (2020)	square miles	square km	people/ sq. mile	people/ sq. km	billions (US$, 2024) ^{2}
The Bronx	Bronx	1,472,654	42.2	109.2	34,920	13,482	58.323
Brooklyn	Kings	2,736,074	69.4	179.7	39,438	15,227	145.934
Manhattan	New York	1,694,251	22.7	58.7	74,781	28,872	1,006.673
Queens	Queens	2,405,464	108.7	281.6	22,125	8,542	143.131
Staten Island	Richmond	495,747	57.5	149.0	8,618	3,327	23.779
City of New York		8,804,190	300.5	778.2	29,303	11,314	1,354.061
State of New York		20,201,249	47,123.6	122,049.5	429	166	2,297.028
Sources: and see individual borough articles.

=== Projections ===
Neighborhood Tabulation Areas (NTAs) are a geographic unit created to help project populations at a small area level, as part of the long-term sustainability plan for the city known as PlaNYC, covering the years 2000–2030. The minimum population for an NTA is 15,000 people, a level seen as a useful summary level which can be used both with the 2010 Census and the American Community Survey.

New York has ranked first in population among American cities since the first census in 1790. New York will maintain this position for the foreseeable future, although there are varying forecasts on how much the population will increase. The most realistic population projections from the Department of City Planning anticipate a 1.1 million increase by 2030, bringing the city's population total to 9.1 million.

While the city's projected 2030 population will be a new high, only two boroughs, Staten Island and Queens have reached their population peak every year for the last 5 years. The study projects that by 2030, Queens will have 2.57 million people and Staten Island 552,000. Manhattan, with 1.83 million, Bronx with 1.46 million and Brooklyn with 2.72 million, will still be below their population peaks.

==== Disputed 2010 Census data ====
On March 27, 2011, New York City Mayor Michael Bloomberg announced that the city would file a formal challenge to the Census results, as a result of alleged undercounting in the boroughs of Queens and Brooklyn. The mayor has asserted that the numbers for Queens and Brooklyn, the two most populous boroughs, are implausible. According to the Census, they grew by only 0.1% and 1.6%, respectively, while the other boroughs grew by between 3% and 5%. In addition, the Mayor claims, the census showed improbably high amounts of vacant housing in vital neighborhoods such as Jackson Heights, Queens.

=== Race and ethnicity ===
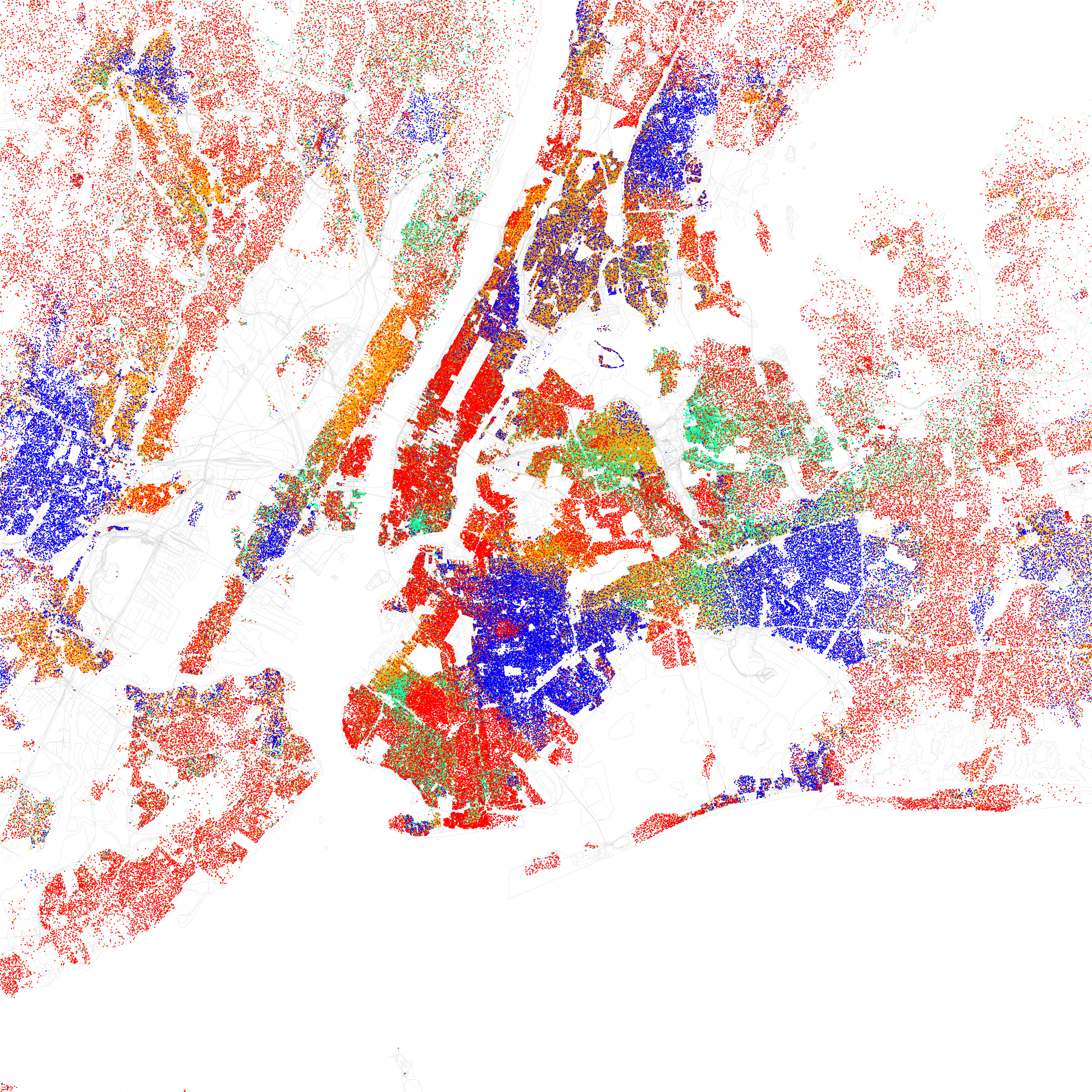
Map of racial distribution in New York, 2010 U.S. Census. Each dot is 25 people: White, Black, Asian, Hispanic, or Other (yellow)

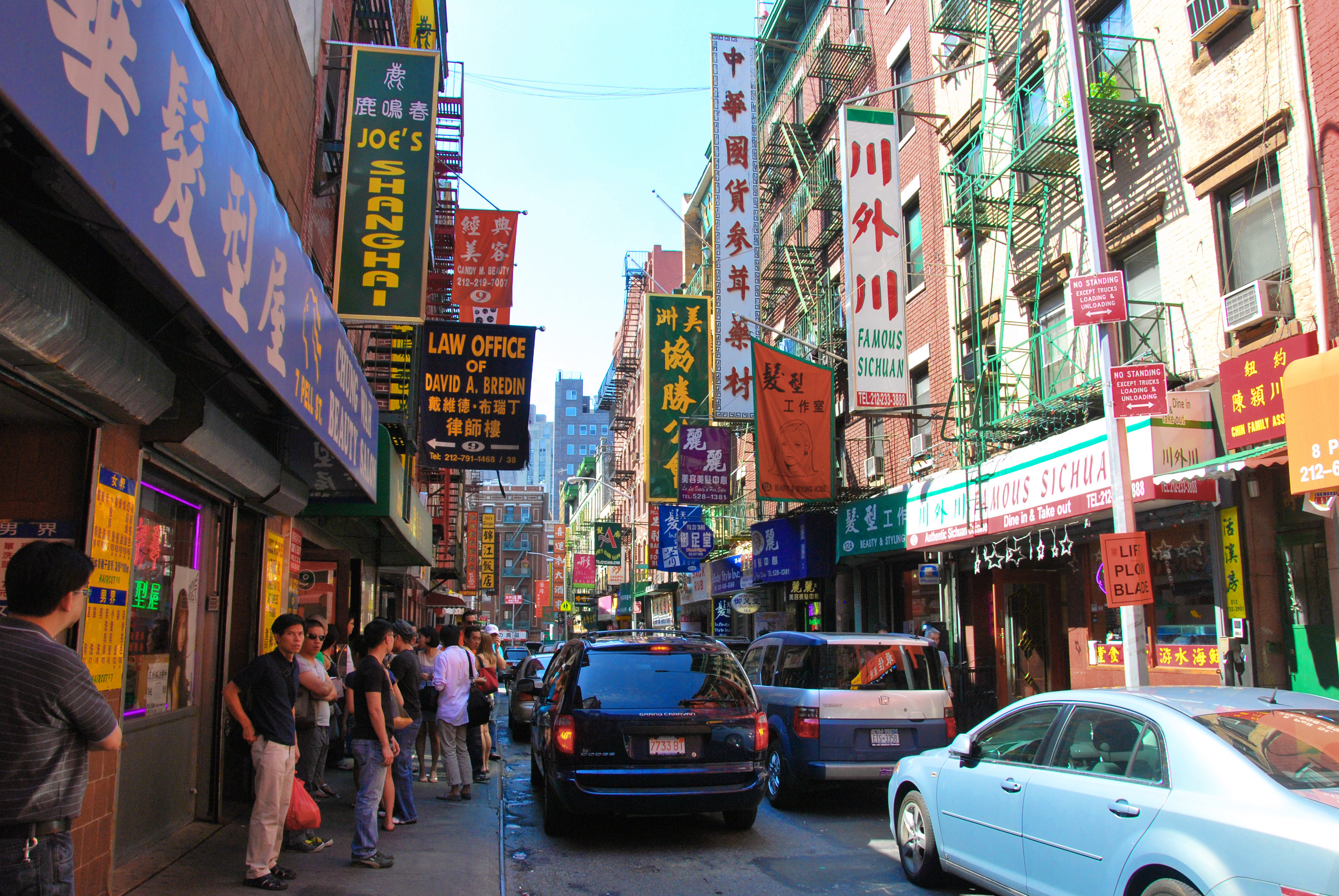
Chinatown, Manhattan, is the highest concentration of Chinese people in the Western Hemisphere.

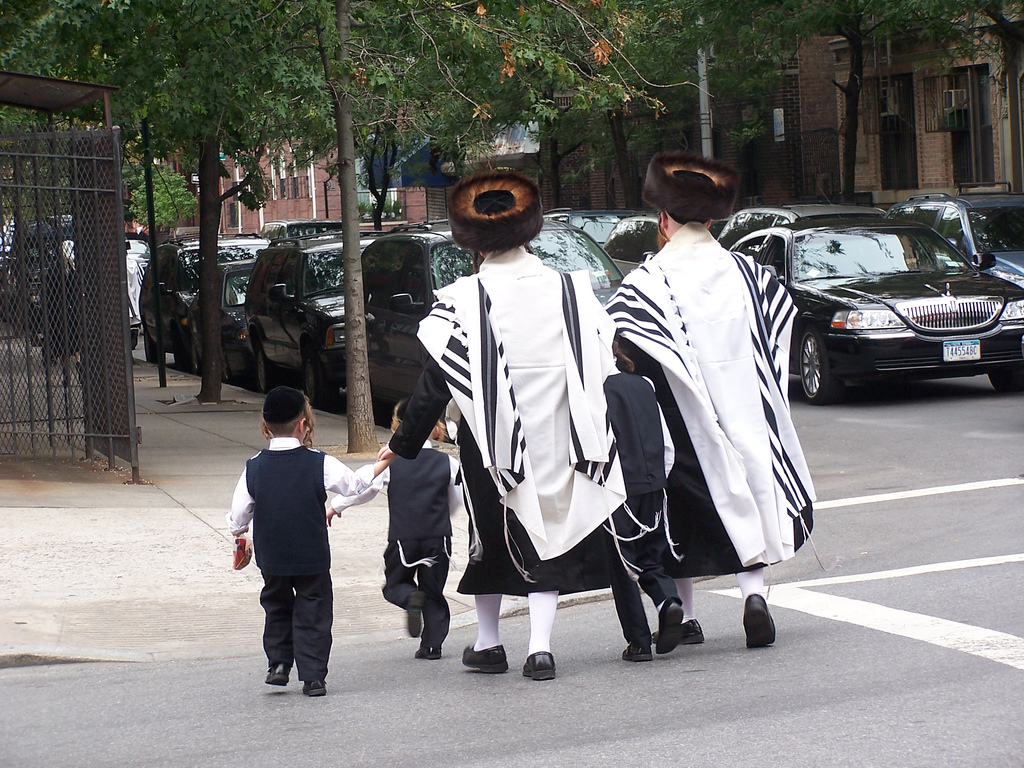
Brooklyn's Jewish community is the largest in the United States, with approximately 561,000 individuals.

The city's population in 2020 was 30.9% White (non-Hispanic), 28.3% Hispanic or Latino, 20.2% Black or African American (non-Hispanic), 15.6% Asian, and 0.2% Native American (non-Hispanic). A total of 3.4% of the non-Hispanic population identified with more than one race and 1.4% as some other race.

New York City, New York – Racial and ethnic composition Note: the US Census treats Hispanic/Latino as an ethnic category. This table excludes Latinos from the racial categories and assigns them to a separate category. Hispanics/Latinos may be of any race.
Race / Ethnicity (NH = Non-Hispanic)	Pop 2000	Pop 2010	Pop 2020	% 2000	% 2010	% 2020
White (NH)	2,801,267	2,722,904	2,719,856	34.98%	33.31%	30.89%
Black or African American (NH)	1,962,154	1,861,295	1,776,891	24.50%	22.77%	20.18%
Native American or Alaska Native (NH)	17,321	17,427	19,146	0.22%	0.21%	0.22%
Asian (NH)	780,229	1,028,119	1,373,502	9.74%	12.58%	15.60%
Pacific Islander or Native Hawaiian (NH)	2,829	2,795	3,302	0.04%	0.03%	0.04%
Some other race (NH)	58,775	57,841	121,184	0.73%	0.71%	1.38%
Two or more races or Multiracial (NH)	225,149	148,676	299,959	2.81%	1.82%	3.41%
Hispanic or Latino (any race)	2,160,554	2,336,076	2,490,350	26.98%	28.58%	28.29%
Total	8,008,278	8,175,133	8,804,190	100.00%	100.00%	100.00%

In 2013, approximately 36% of the city's population is foreign born, and more than half of all children are born to mothers who are immigrants. Between 1990 and 2000 the city admitted 1,224,524 immigrants. Demographers and city officials have observed that immigration to New York City has been slowing since 1997. This is mostly due to more and more immigrants choosing directly to locate to the city's suburbs and then commute to the city or work in many of its booming edge cities such as Fort Lee, NJ, Hempstead, NY, Morristown, NJ, Stamford, CT, White Plains, NY, and others. Despite the slowdown in immigration the city's overall immigrant population has continued to increase and in 2006 it numbered 3.038 million (37.0%) up from 2.871 million (35.9%) in 2000. By 2013, the population of foreign-born individuals living in New York City had increased to 3.07 million, and as a percentage of total population, was the highest it had been in the past 100 years.

Throughout its history, New York City has been a principal port of entry for immigration to the United States. These immigrants often form ethnic enclaves, neighborhoods dominated by one ethnicity. The city experienced major immigration from Europe in the 19th century and another major wave in the early 20th century, being admitted into the United States of America primarily through Ellis Island. Since the passage of the Immigration and Nationality Act of 1965, and particularly since the 1980s, New York City has seen renewed rates of high immigration. Newer immigrants are from Latin America. In 2011, 37% of the city's population was foreign-born, the highest among U.S. cities.

In New York, no single country or region of origin dominates. The ten largest sources of foreign-born individuals in the city as of 2011 were the Dominican Republic, China, Mexico, Guyana, Jamaica, Ecuador, Haiti, India, Russia, Trinidad and Tobago, and El Salvador. Queens has the largest Asian American and Andean populations in the United States, and is also the most ethnically and linguistically diverse urban area in the world.

The metropolitan area is home to 20% of the nation's Indian Americans and at least 20 Little India enclaves, and 15% of all Korean Americans and four Koreatowns; the largest Asian Indian population in the Western Hemisphere; the largest Russian American, Italian American, and African American populations; the largest Dominican American, Puerto Rican American, and South American and second-largest overall Hispanic population in the United States, numbering 4.8 million; and includes multiple established Chinatowns within New York City alone.

New York City has the largest European and non-Hispanic white population of any American city, with 2.7 million in 2012. The European diaspora residing in the city is very diverse and many European ethnic groups have formed enclaves in New York. More than 12 million European immigrants were received at Ellis Island between 1892 and 1954.

Asian Americans in New York City, according to the 2010 census, number more than one million, greater than the combined totals of San Francisco and Los Angeles. New York contains the highest total Asian population of any U.S. city proper. New York has the largest Chinese population of any city outside Asia, and the Manhattan's Chinatown is the highest concentration of Chinese people in the Western Hemisphere, while Queens is home to the largest Tibetan population outside Asia. As of 2023, illegal Chinese immigration to New York City, especially to Queens and its Flushing Chinatown, has accelerated, and a significant new wave of Chinese Hui Muslims are fleeing religious persecution in southwestern China's Yunnan Province and seeking religious freedom in New York. Arab Americans number over 160,000 in New York City, with the highest concentration in Brooklyn. Uzbek Americans and Armenian Americans are a rapidly growing segment of the city's non-Hispanic White population.

New York is also home to the highest Jewish population of any city in the world, numbering 960,000 in 2023, more than Tel Aviv and Jerusalem combined. In the borough of Brooklyn, an estimated 1 in 4 residents is Jewish.

Venezuela, Ecuador, Colombia, Guyana, Peru, and Brazil are the top source countries from South America for immigrants to the New York City region; the Dominican Republic, Jamaica, Haiti, and Trinidad and Tobago in the Caribbean; Nigeria, Egypt, Ghana, Tanzania, Kenya, and South Africa from Africa; and El Salvador, Honduras, and Guatemala in Central America. Amidst a resurgence of Puerto Rican migration to New York City, this population had increased to approximately 1.5 million in the metropolitan area as of 2016.

Since 2010, Little Australia has emerged and is growing rapidly, representing the Australasian presence in Nolita, Manhattan. In 2011, there were an estimated 20,000 Australian residents of New York City, nearly quadruple the 5,537 in 2005. Qantas of Australia and Air New Zealand have been planning for long-haul flights from New York to Sydney and Auckland, which would both rank among the longest non-stop flights in the world.

=== Languages ===
In 2024, the most spoken languages in New York City were English (4,149,096, or 51.72% of the population), Spanish (1,808,138, or 22.54%), Chinese (525,042, or 6.54%), Russian (172,756, or 2.15%), and Bengali (152,129, or 1.9%).

In 1910, the most spoken languages in New York City were English (1,985,995, or 41.66% of the population), (Note: Sum of all 972,968 respondents "of foreign stock" (either foreign-born or with at least one foreign-born parent) who listed "White" as their ethnicity and "English" as their mother tongue, all 921,318 who listed "White" as their ethnicity and were native-born to native-born parents, and all 91,709 respondents who listed "Negro" as their ethnicity.) Yiddish (861,980, or 18.08%), German (841,889, or 17.66%), Italian (549,444, or 11.53%), and Polish (116,161, or 2.44%).

In 2024, the most spoken languages in Manhattan were English (1,020,628, or 63.9% of the population), Spanish (284,447, or 17.81%), Chinese (87,865, or 5.5%), French (29,621, or 1.85%), and Italian (12,992, or 0.81%).

In 1910, the most spoken languages in Manhattan were English (874,511, or 37.51% of the population), (Note: Sum of all 469,626 respondents "of foreign stock" (either foreign-born or with at least one foreign-born parent) who listed "White" as their ethnicity and "English" as their mother tongue, all 344,351 who listed "White" as their ethnicity and were native-born to native-born parents, and all 60,534 respondents who listed "Negro" as their ethnicity.) Yiddish (533,444, or 22.88%), German (337,403, or 14.47%), Italian (310,507, or 13.32%), and Polish (50,218, or 2.15%).

=== Religion ===
Religious affiliation (2014)
Christian	59%
Catholic	33%
Protestant	23%
Other Christian	3%
Unaffiliated	24%
Jewish	8%
Muslim	4%
Hindu	2%
Buddhist	1%
Other faiths	1%

Religious affiliations in New York City

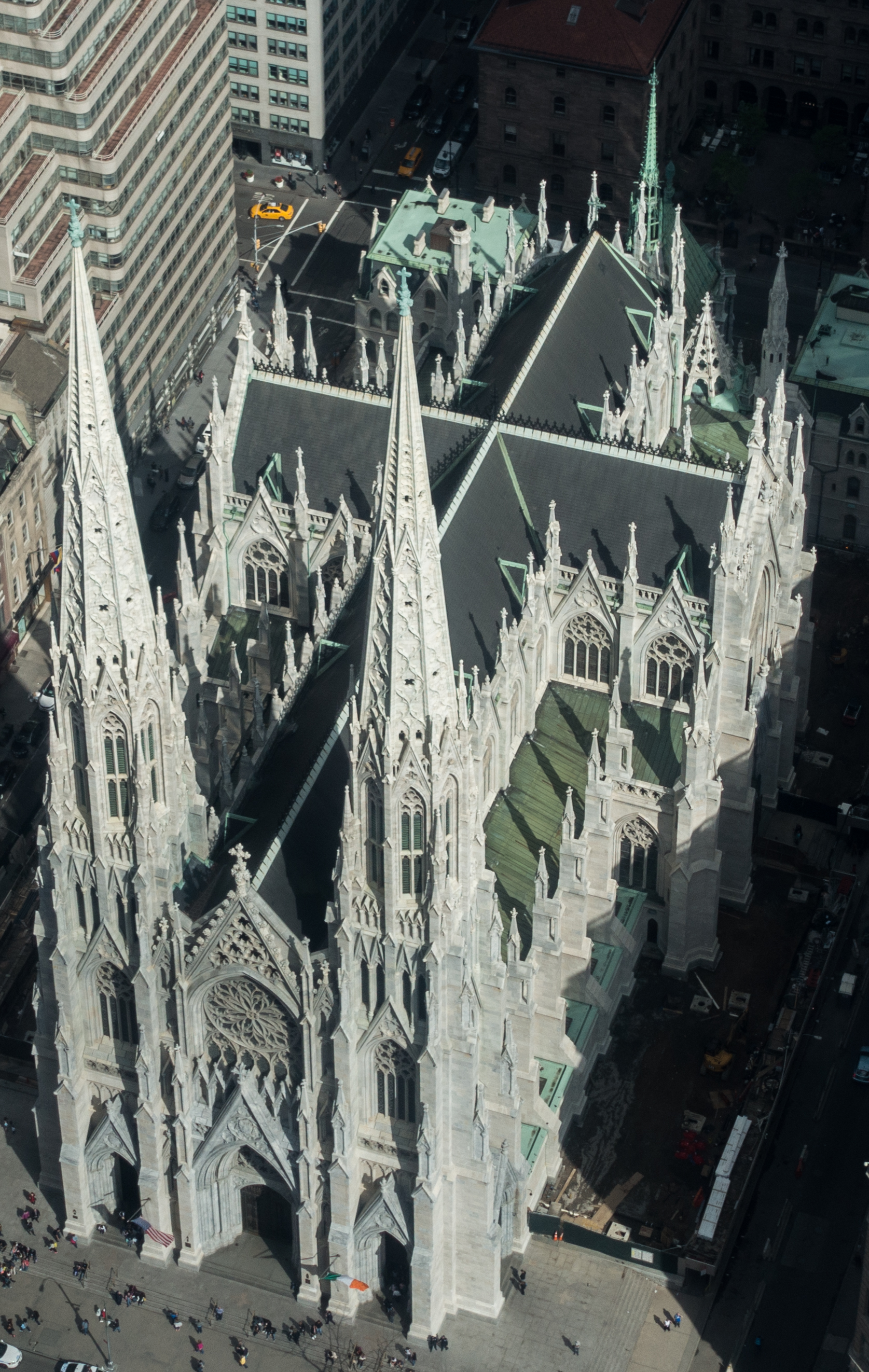
The landmark Neo-Gothic Roman Catholic St. Patrick's Cathedral, Midtown Manhattan

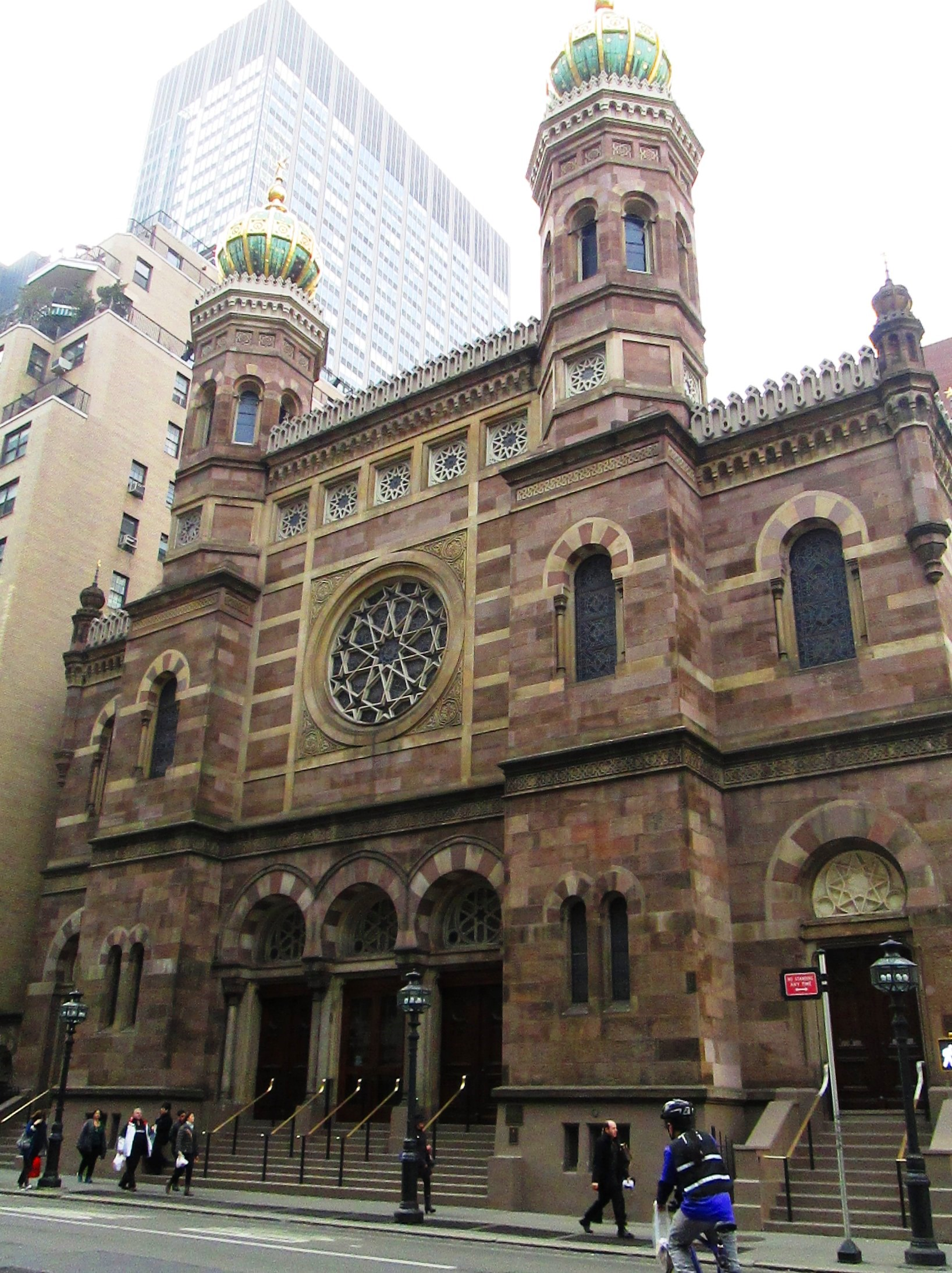
Central Synagogue, a notable Reform synagogue located at 652 Lexington Avenue

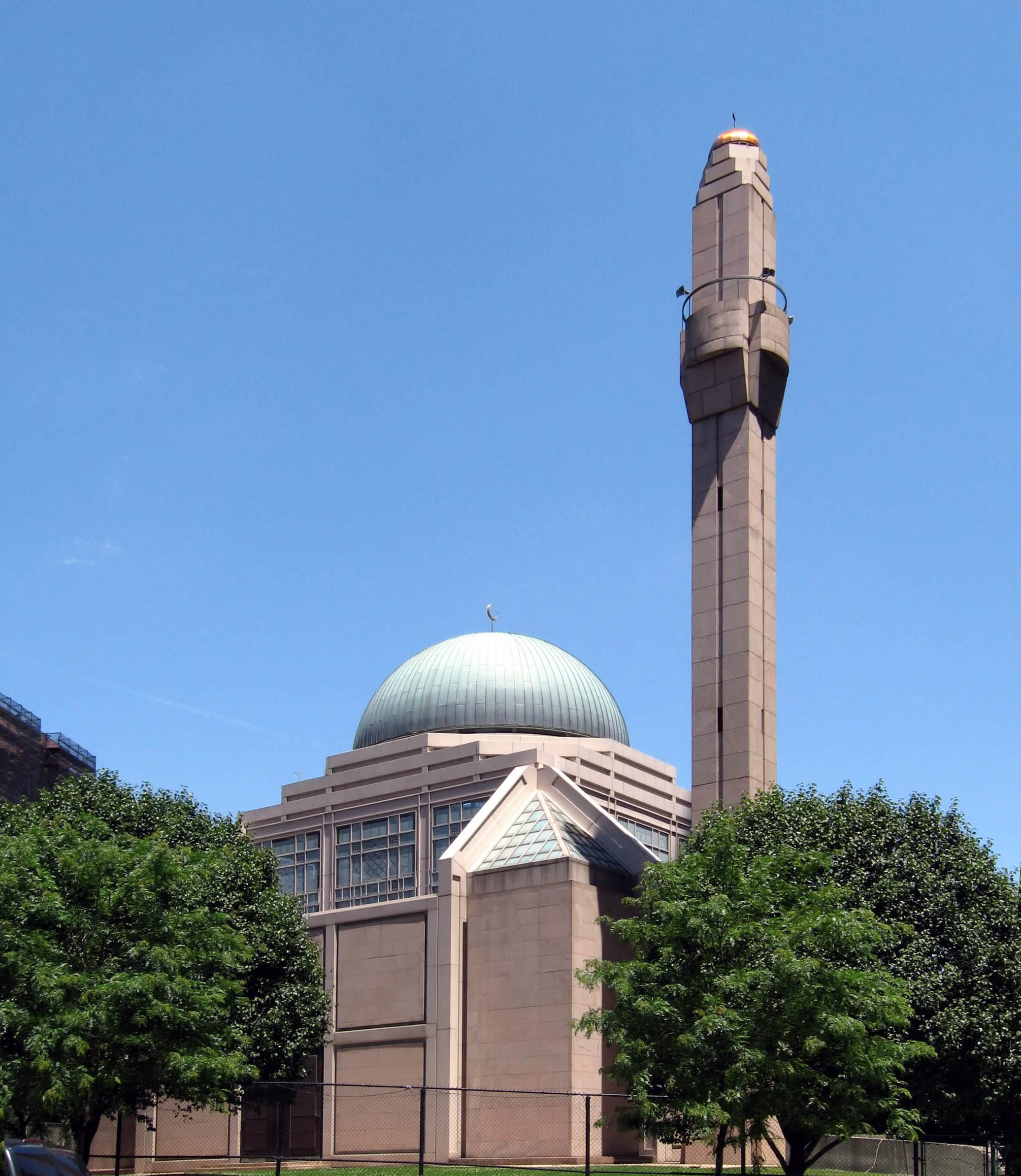
The Islamic Cultural Center of New York in Upper Manhattan, the first mosque built in New York City

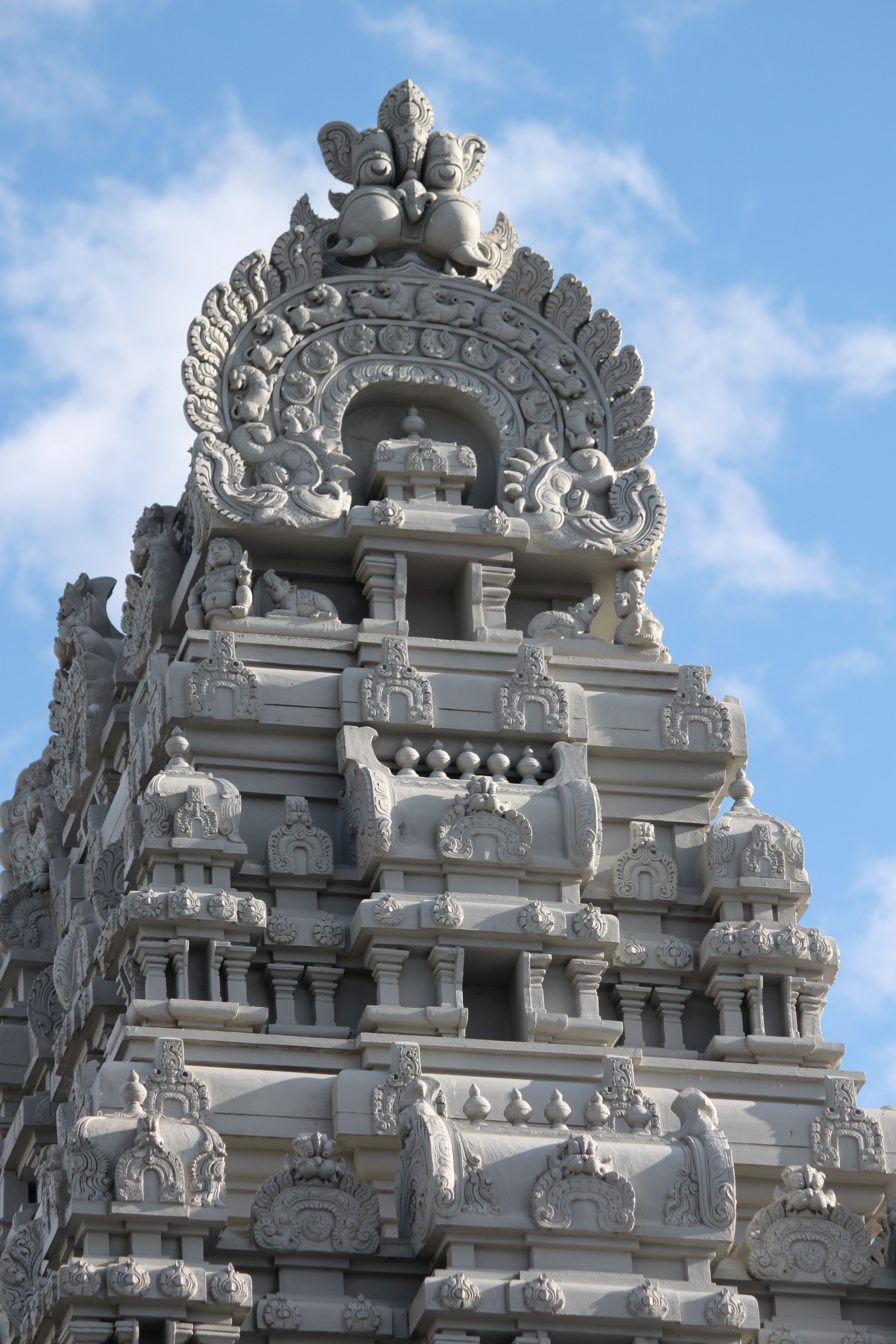
Ganesh Temple in Flushing, Queens, one of the oldest Hindu temples in the U.S.

==== Christianity ====
Christianity is the largest religion (59% adherent) in New York City, which is home to the highest number of churches of any city in the world. Roman Catholicism is the largest Christian denomination (33%), followed by Protestantism (23%), and other Christian denominations (3%). The Roman Catholic population are primarily served by the Roman Catholic Archdiocese of New York and Diocese of Brooklyn. Eastern Catholics are divided into numerous jurisdictions throughout the city. Evangelical Protestantism is the largest branch of Protestantism in the city (9%), followed by Mainline Protestantism (8%), while the converse is usually true for other cities and metropolitan areas. In Evangelicalism, Baptists are the largest group; in Mainline Protestantism, Reformed Protestants compose the largest subset. The majority of historically African American churches are affiliated with the National Baptist Convention (USA) and Progressive National Baptist Convention. The Church of God in Christ is one of the largest predominantly Black Pentecostal denominations in the area. Approximately 1% of the population is Mormon. The Greek Orthodox Archdiocese of America and other Orthodox Christians (mainstream and independent) were the largest Eastern Christian groups. The American Orthodox Catholic Church (initially led by Aftimios Ofiesh) was founded in New York City in 1927.

==== Judaism ====
In 2011, a report by the UJA-Federation of New York found the Jewish population of New York City to stand at 1.1 million. In that same study, 16% of Jews in the New York City and the nearby Nassau, Suffolk, and Westchester counties identified as ethnically Jewish, as opposed to being religiously Jewish. Judaism is the second-largest religion practiced in New York City, making it the largest Jewish community of any city in the world, greater than the totals of Tel Aviv and Jerusalem. Nearly half of the city's Jews live in Brooklyn, which is one-quarter Jewish. In 2012, the largest Jewish denominations were Orthodox, Haredi, and Conservative Judaism. The first wave of Jewish migration to New York City occurred the 1650s, consisting of Sephardic Jews from Recife who originally sought refuge in Dutch Brazil following the Spanish Inquisition, and later fled to New York after Portugal retook Recife. The Jewish population in New York City exploded from 80,000 Jews in 1880 to 1.5 million in 1920, as Jews from Eastern Europe fled pogroms and discrimination. The Jewish population peaked at 2.2 million in 1940. A large portion of the population suburbanized after World War II, as a part of the larger trend of White flight. Still, the 1970s saw the arrival of Jews migrating to New York City from the USSR, Syria, and Iran. Reform Jewish communities are prevalent through the area. 770 Eastern Parkway is the headquarters of the international Chabad Lubavitch movement, and is considered an icon, while Congregation Emanu-El of New York in Manhattan is the largest Reform synagogue in the world.

==== Islam ====
Islam ranks as the third largest religion in New York City, following Christianity and Judaism, with estimates ranging between 600,000 and 1,000,000 observers of Islam, including 10% of the city's public school children. 22.3% of American Muslims live in New York City, with 1.5 million Muslims in the greater New York metropolitan area, representing the largest metropolitan Muslim population in the Western Hemisphere—and the most ethnically diverse Muslim population of any city in the world. Powers Street Mosque in Brooklyn is one of the oldest continuously operating mosques in the U.S., and represents the first Islamic organization in both the city and the state of New York.

==== Other religious affiliations ====
Following these three largest religious groups in New York City are Hinduism, Buddhism, Sikhism, Zoroastrianism, and a variety of other religions. As of 2023, 24% of Greater New Yorkers identified with no organized religious affiliation, including 4% Atheist.

=== Wealth and income disparity ===
New York City, like other large cities, has a high degree of income disparity, as indicated by its Gini coefficient of 0.55 as of 2017. In the first quarter of 2014, the average weekly wage in New York County (Manhattan) was $2,749, representing the highest total among large counties in the United States. In 2022, New York City was home to the highest number of billionaires of any city in the world, with a total of 107. New York also had the highest density of millionaires per capita among major U.S. cities in 2014, at 4.6% of residents. New York City is one of the relatively few American cities levying an income tax (about 3%) on its residents. As of 2018, there were 78,676 homeless people in New York City.

== Vital statistics ==
Year	Population	Live births	Deaths	Natural change	Crude birth rate (per 1,000)	Crude death rate (per 1,000)	Natural change (per 1,000)	Crude migration change (per 1,000)
2000	8,017,608	121,041	60,398	60,643	15.1	7.5	7.6	
2001	8,059,813	119,618	61,124	58,494	14.8	7.6	7.2	-2.0
2002	8,072,000	118,294	59,406	58,888	14.7	7.4	7.3	-5.8
2003	8,068,073	119,817	58,615	61,202	14.9	7.3	7.6	-8.1
2004	8,043,366	119,068	56,877	62,191	14.8	7.1	7.7	-10.8
2005	8,013,368	117,538	56,573	60,965	14.7	7.1	7.6	-11.4
2006	7,993,906	119,896	54,917	64,979	15.0	6.9	8.1	-10.6
2007	8,013,775	123,326	53,569	69,757	15.4	6.7	8.7	-6.2
2008	8,068,195	122,251	53,794	68,457	15.2	6.7	8.5	-1.7
2009	8,131,574	122,342	52,543	69,799	15.0	6.5	8.5	-0.8
2010	8,203,084	120,697	52,008	68,689	14.7	6.3	8.4	0.3
2011	8,337,907	119,395	52,545	66,850	14.3	6.3	8.0	8.2
2012	8,463,961	119,562	52,135	67,427	14.1	6.2	7.9	6.9
2013	8,565,517	116,777	53,137	63,640	13.6	6.2	7.4	4.4
2014	8,655,238	117,677	52,607	65,070	13.6	6.1	7.5	2.8
2015	8,736,590	117,050	53,463	63,587	13.4	6.1	7.3	2.0
2016	8,794,592	115,391	53,718	61,673	13.1	6.1	7.0	-0.4
2017	8,815,395	111,736	53,823	57,913	12.7	6.1	6.6	-4.2
2018	8,826,377	108,943	54,461	54,482	12.3	6.2	6.1	-4.9
2019	8,824,751	105,403	54,012	51,391	11.9	6.1	5.8	-6.0
2020	8,751,188	96,641	82,940	13,701	11.0	9.5	1.5	-10.0
2021	8,447,958	93,621	63,567	30,054	11.1	7.5	3.6	-39.5
2022	8,362,665	93,054	60,446	32,608	11.1	7.2	3.9	-14.1
2023	8,433,834	91,803	54,950	36,853	10.9	6.5	4.4	4.1
2024	8,596,825	93,185	54,810	38,375	10.8	6.4	4.4	14.5
2025	8,584,629							

== See also ==
- Demographics of the Bronx
- Demographics of Brooklyn
- Demographics of Manhattan
- Demographics of Queens
- Demographics of Staten Island
- Illegal immigration to New York City
- New York City ethnic enclaves
