= Demographics of Manhattan =

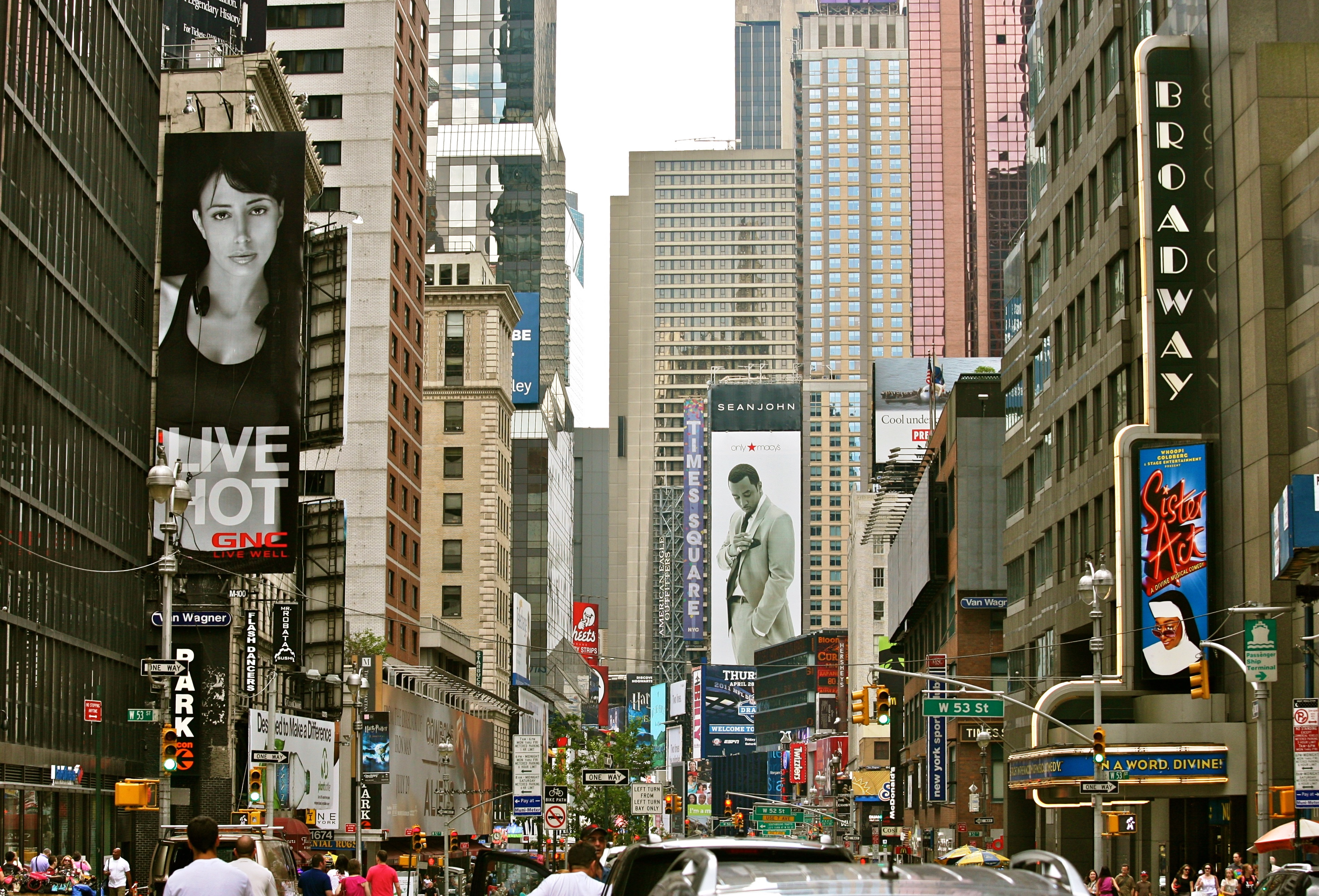
Looking down Broadway in Midtown Manhattan. As of the 2020 U.S. census, Manhattan (New York County) was home to 74,870.7 inhabitants per square mile (28,907.7/km^{2}), rendering it the most densely populated municipality in the United States.

New York City's five boroughs
Jurisdiction		Population	Land area		Density of population		GDP
Borough	County	Census (2020)	square miles	square km	people/ sq. mile	people/ sq. km	billions (US$, 2024) ^{2}
The Bronx	Bronx	1,472,654	42.2	109.2	34,920	13,482	58.323
Brooklyn	Kings	2,736,074	69.4	179.7	39,438	15,227	145.934
Manhattan	New York	1,694,251	22.7	58.7	74,781	28,872	1,006.673
Queens	Queens	2,405,464	108.7	281.6	22,125	8,542	143.131
Staten Island	Richmond	495,747	57.5	149.0	8,618	3,327	23.779
City of New York		8,804,190	300.5	778.2	29,303	11,314	1,354.061
State of New York		20,201,249	47,123.6	122,049.5	429	166	2,297.028
Sources: and see individual borough articles.

New York County, coterminous with the New York City borough of Manhattan, is the most densely populated U.S. county, with a density of 70,825.6/mi^{2} (27,345.9/km^{2}) as of 2013. In 1910, it reached a peak of 101,548/mi^{2} (39,208/km^{2}). The county is one of the original counties of New York State.

== Demographics from the 2020 census ==
Historical population
Year	Pop.	±%
1656	1,000	—
1698	4,937	+393.7%
1712	5,841	+18.3%
1723	7,248	+24.1%
1731	8,622	+19.0%
1746	11,717	+35.9%
1756	13,040	+11.3%
1771	21,863	+67.7%
1786	23,614	+8.0%
1790	33,131	+40.3%
1800	60,489	+82.6%
1810	96,373	+59.3%
1820	123,706	+28.4%
1830	202,589	+63.8%
1840	312,710	+54.4%
1850	515,547	+64.9%
1860	813,669	+57.8%
1870	942,292	+15.8%
1880	1,164,674	+23.6%
1890	1,441,216	+23.7%
1900	1,850,093	+28.4%
1910	2,331,542	+26.0%
1920	2,284,103	−2.0%
1930	1,867,312	−18.2%
1940	1,889,924	+1.2%
1950	1,960,101	+3.7%
1960	1,698,281	−13.4%
1970	1,539,233	−9.4%
1980	1,428,285	−7.2%
1990	1,487,536	+4.1%
2000	1,537,195	+3.3%
2010	1,585,873	+3.2%
2020	1,694,251	+6.8%

Manhattan / New York County, New York – Racial and ethnic composition Note: the US Census treats Hispanic/Latino as an ethnic category. This table excludes Latinos from the racial categories and assigns them to a separate category. Hispanics/Latinos may be of any race.
Race / Ethnicity (NH = Non-Hispanic)	Pop 1980	Pop 1990	Pop 2000	Pop 2010	Pop 2020	% 1980	% 1990	% 2000	% 2010	% 2020
White alone (NH)	713,854	726,755	703,873	761,493	793,294	49.98%	48.86%	45.79%	48.02%	46.82%
Black or African American alone (NH)	290,218	261,120	234,698	205,340	199,592	20.32%	17.55%	15.27%	12.95%	11.78%
Native American or Alaska Native alone (NH)	3,036	2,793	2,465	2,144	1,895	0.21%	0.19%	0.16%	0.14%	0.11%
Asian alone (NH)	72,884	106,306	143,291	177,624	219,624	5.10%	7.15%	9.32%	11.20%	12.96%
Native Hawaiian or Pacific Islander alone (NH)	x	x	572	533	882	x	x	0.04%	0.03%	0.05%
Other race alone (NH)	12,046	3,932	5,536	5,205	13,335	0.84%	0.26%	0.36%	0.33%	0.79%
Mixed race or Multiracial (NH)	x	x	28,944	29,957	62,989	x	x	1.88%	1.89%	3.72%
Hispanic or Latino (any race)	336,247	386,630	417,816	403,577	402,640	23.54%	25.99%	27.18%	25.45%	23.77%
Total	1,428,285	1,487,536	1,537,195	1,585,873	1,694,251	100.00%	100.00%	100.00%	100.00%	100.00%

According to New York City Department of City Planning's 2020 census, there were a total of 1,694,251 residents with 793,294 White residents making up 46.8%, 402,640 Hispanic residents making up 23.8%, 219,624 Asian residents making up 13.0%, and 199,592 Black residents making up 11.8%. For a long time, the Asian population in the borough had always been at the lowest ranking in the borough, but in 2020, for the first time in history, the Asian population has surpassed the Black population in the borough, meanwhile the Black population has now fallen to the lowest population ranking. The Hispanic population still makes up the largest non-white population in the borough.

From 2010 to 2020, only the White and Asian populations and other racial group populations increased while the Hispanic and Black populations declined. Of the population gains from 2010 to 2020, the White population went from 761,493 residents at 48.0% to 793,294 residents at 46.8%, a gain of 31,801 residents or 4.2%, though because of increases from other racial groups, the White population percentage portion out of the total Manhattan population did slightly drop, the Asian population went from 177,624 residents at 11.2% to 219,624 residents at 13.0%, a gain of 42,000 or 23.6% and they contributed to the largest increase in population in the borough, Some Other Race population went from 7,882 residents at 0.5% to 16,112 residents at 1.0%, a gain of 8,230 residents or 104.4%, the multiracial population went from 29,957 residents at 1.9% to 62,989 residents at 3.7%, a gain of 33,032 residents or 110.3%. Of the population declines from 2010 to 2020, the Hispanic population went from 403,577 residents at 25.4% to 402,640 residents at 23.8% a decline of -937 residents or -0.2, though the Hispanic population decline was very minor whereas the Black population had the largest decline of all racial groups in Manhattan going from 205,340 residents at 12.9% to 199,592 residents at 11.8%, a decline of -5,748 residents or -2.8%.

== Demographics from the 2010 census ==
At the 2010 Census, there were 1,585,873 people living in Manhattan, an increase of 3.2% since 2000. Since 2010, Manhattan's population was estimated by the Census Bureau to have increased 2.5% to 1,626,159 as of 2013, representing 19.3% of the city's population and 8.3% of the state's population.

According to the 2010 Census, 48.0% of the population was non-Hispanic White, 12.9% non-Hispanic Black or African American, 0.1% non-Hispanic American Indian and Alaska Native, 11.2% non-Hispanic Asian, 0.3% from some other race (non-Hispanic) and 1.9% of two or more races (non-Hispanic). 25.4% of Manhattan's population was of Hispanic, Latino, or Spanish origin (they may be of any race).

Manhattan has the second highest percentage of non-Hispanic Whites (48%) of New York City's boroughs, after Staten Island (where non-Hispanic Whites make 64.0% of the residents).

== Demographics from the 2000 census ==
In the 2000 census, there were 1,537,195 people, 738,644 households, and 302,105 families residing in the county. The population density was 25,859.8 people/km^{2} (66,977 people/mi^{2}). There were 798,144 housing units at an average density of 13,421.8 units/km^{2} (34,762 units/mi^{2}). The racial makeup of the county was 54.36% White (45.79% White Non-Hispanic), 9.40% Asian, 0.07% Pacific Islander, 17.39% African American, 0.50% Native American, 14.14% from other races, and 4.14% from two or more races. 27.18% of the population were Hispanic of any race. 29.43% of the population was foreign born; of this, 48.4% came from Latin America, 27.1% from Asia, 18.4% from Europe and 6.1% from other parts of the world.

The census of 2000 showed that the neighborhoods of Lower Manhattan (i.e., Manhattan south of Houston street) had a sharply different population than the rest of the borough with 41% Asian, 32% white (non-Hispanic), 19% Hispanic, and 6% black. In addition, 43% of the inhabitants were immigrants. The high number of immigrants are related to those in Chinatown, whose population accounts for 55% of the total of Lower Manhattan.

== 2009 American community survey ==
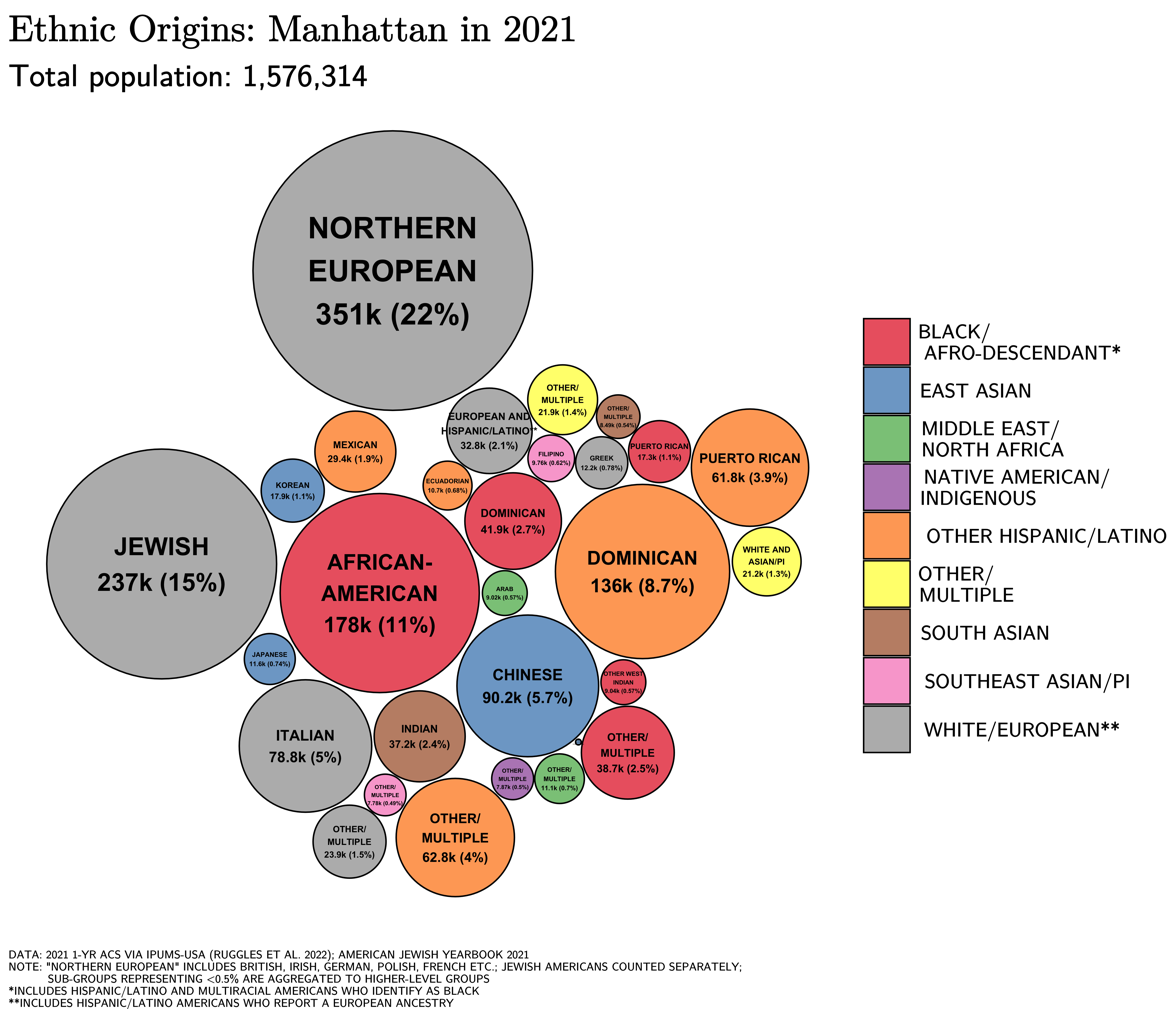
Ethnic origins in Manhattan

According to the 2009 American Community Survey, White Americans made up 58.9% of Manhattan's population; non-Hispanic whites made up 50.7% of the population. Black Americans made up 15.5% of Manhattan's population; non-Hispanic blacks made up 13.0% of the population; Native Americans made up 0.3% of the population; Asian Americans made up 10.3% of the population; Multiracial Americans made up 3.4% of the population; Hispanics and Latinos made up 23.8% of Manhattan's population. White Americans are the largest racial group in Manhattan; whites make up 58.9% of the borough's population. Whites of non-Hispanic origin form a slight majority, making up 50.7% of the population. Of Manhattan's 1,630,000 people, 960,000 are white, of which 825,000 are non-Hispanic whites. Manhattan's white population is ethnically heterogeneous. German Americans are the largest Euro-American ethnic group in the borough, making up 7.2% of the population. Irish Americans and Italian Americans make up 6.9% and 5.5% of the population, respectively. Russian Americans are also sizable, making up 6.2% of the populace. Americans of English descent form 5.2% of the borough's population, and Polish Americans make up 4.8% of the populace. Americans of French descent make up 1.9% of Manhattan's population, while those of Scottish descent form 1.3% of the populace. Jewish Americans, most of whom self-identify as "white" under the U.S. Census classifications, are most concentrated in the Upper West Side, Upper East Side, and Midtown regions of Manhattan.

Black Americans make up 15.5% of the borough's population and are concentrated primarily in the Upper Manhattan region of Harlem. The percentage of Blacks in Manhattan has continually been on the decline since the end of World War II. This is in large part due to the exodus of Black residents from Harlem which peaked in population in 1950 and the establishment of Black communities in the other boroughs such as Bedford Stuyvesant, Brooklyn, Southeast Queens, and the Northeast Bronx. Blacks of non-Hispanic origin form 13.0% of the population. Roughly 253,000 are black, of which 211,000 are non-Hispanic blacks. Roughly 27,000 residents reported their ancestry as Sub-Saharan African in the survey, which is equal to 1.6% of Manhattan's population. Included in the African descendant population in Harlem are African immigrants and Afro-Caribbeans from the West Indies. Harlem has seen a pattern of gentrification and a wave of new businesses came to the section during the 1990s and it is home of an increasingly large upper-class of all races, but the majority happen to be African-American.

Native Americans are one of the borough's smallest ethnic minority groups. Only 5,500 individuals of the borough's 1.6 million people are Native Americans. The number of Native Americans who are of non-Hispanic origin is even smaller. Roughly 1,370 residents are Native Americans of non-Hispanic descent, which is 0.1% of the population. In addition, people who are of mixed Caucasian and Native American ancestry make up 0.2% of the population. There are a number of Mohawks indigenous to the New York city area and/or Upstate New York, and many Mohawks arrived in the 1930s to work in the skyscraper building construction industry.

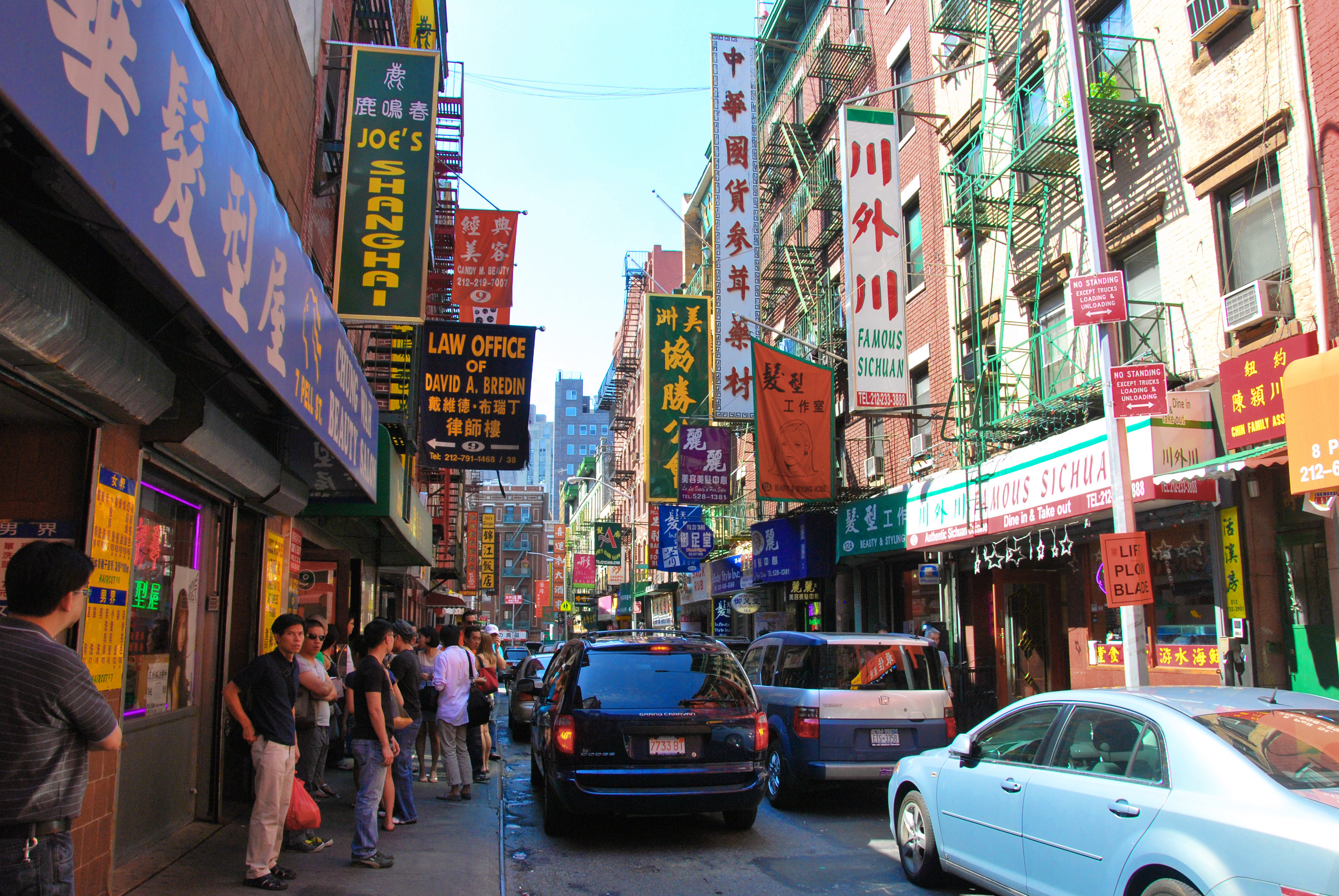
Manhattan Chinatown

Asian Americans are one of the borough's larger racial groups. Asians represent 10.3% of Manhattan's population. Asians of non-Hispanic origin make up 10.2% of the population. Like the Caucasian population, the Asian population is ethnically heterogeneous. Chinese Americans make up the majority of the Asian population. Of Manhattan's 168,000 Asians, some 90,000 are of Chinese descent (5.6% of the population). Roughly 21,000 residents are of Indian descent. Manhattan is home to over 16,300 Koreans, 15,200 Japanese, 11,800 Filipinos, and nearly 3,000 Vietnamese.

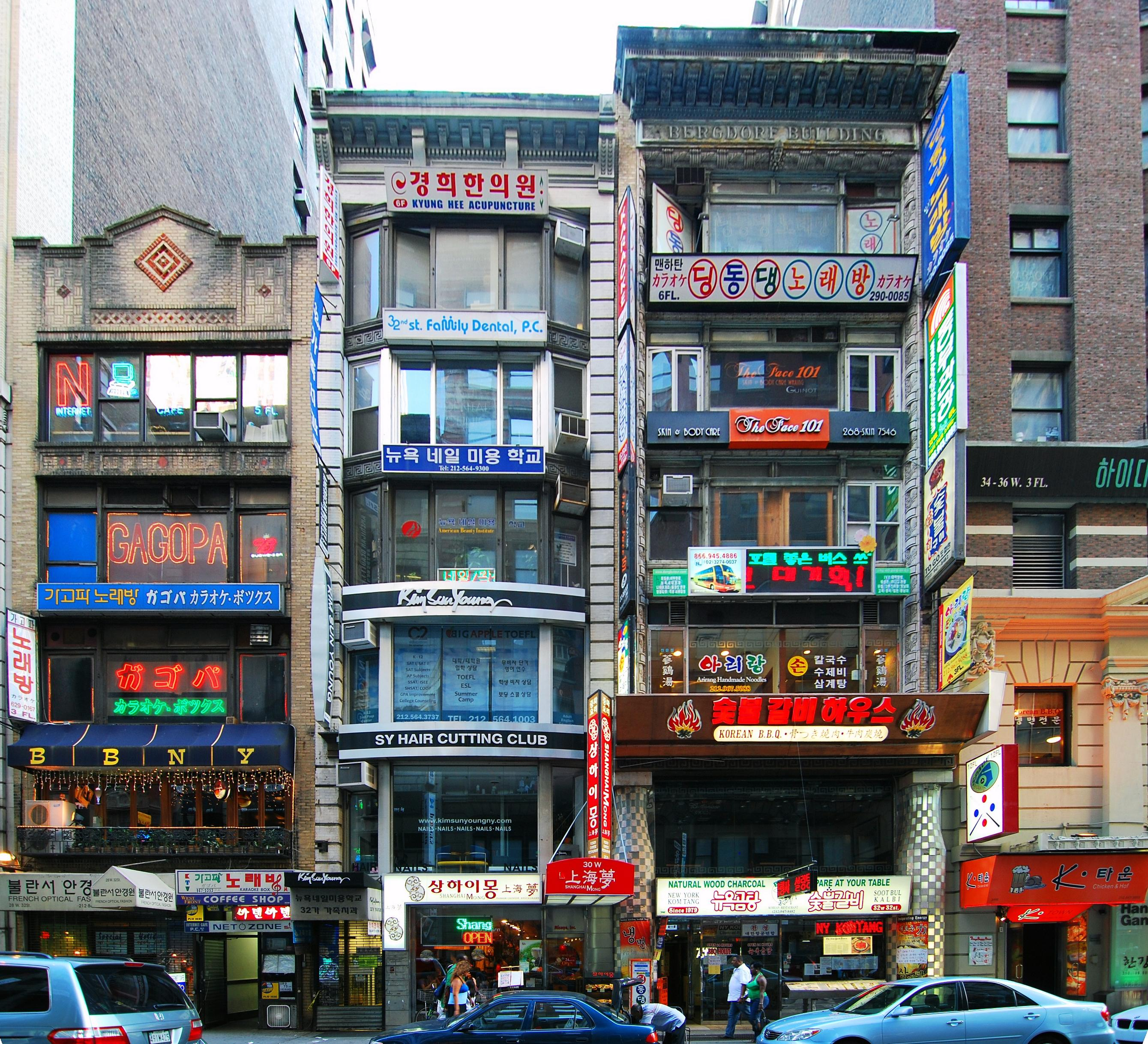
32nd street in Manhattan's Koreatown, 2009.

Pacific Islander Americans are, by far, the smallest racial minority group in Manhattan. Just over 540 people identified themselves as such. Also, just above 270 individuals are Pacific Islanders of non-Hispanic origin.

Multiracial Americans are a smaller minority group in Manhattan, but they are sizable. Nearly 55,000 multiracial individuals call Manhattan home, and they make up 3.4% of the population. People of European American and African American heritage form 1.4% of the population, and number over 22,200 individuals. In addition, people of Caucasian and Asian heritage make up 0.8% of the population, and number over 13,400 individuals. People of African American and Native American heritage make up 0.1% of the population, and they number at nearly 1,800 individuals.

Hispanic and Latino Americans are the largest ethnic minority group in Manhattan. Over 387,000 Hispanics and Latinos represent 23.8% of Manhattan's total population. Significant groups include Puerto Ricans, Dominicans and Mexicans; Puerto Ricans make up 6.7% of the population, and number over 109,000 individuals. Mexicans make up 2.7% of the population, and number over 43,000 individuals. In addition, the borough is home to over 10,000 Cubans; people of Cuban descent form 0.6% of the population. Lastly, there are over 224,000 Hispanics that are of other ethnic groups, such as Ecuadorian, Salvadoran, etc. These people collectively make up 13.8% of the population. Hispanics are numerous throughout the borough but most prominently in East Harlem, Loisada, and Washington Heights.

== Household income ==
There were 738,644 households, out of which 17.1% had children under the age of 18 living with them, 25.2% were married couples living together, 12.6% had a female householder with no husband present, and 59.1% were non-families. 48.0% of all households were made up of individuals, and 10.9% had someone living alone who was 65 years of age or older. The average household size was 2.00 and the average family size was 2.99.

In the county the population was spread out, with 16.8% under the age of 18, 10.2% from 18 to 24, 38.3% from 25 to 44, 22.6% from 45 to 64, and 12.2% who were 65 years of age or older. The median age was 36 years. For every 100 females there were 90.3 males. For every 100 females age 18 and over, there were 87.9 males. The largest age cohort in the county was 25–29(recent college graduates).

The median income for a household in the county was $47,030, and the median income for a family was $50,229. Males had a median income of $51,856 versus $45,712 for females. The per capita income for the county was $42,922. About 17.6% of families and 20.0% of the population were below the poverty line, including 31.8% of those under age 18 and 18.9% of those age 65 or over.

== Languages ==
As of 2010, 59.98% (902,267) of Manhattan residents age 5 and older spoke English at home as a primary language, while 23.07% (347,033) spoke Spanish, 5.33% (80,240) Chinese, 2.03% (30,567) French, 0.78% (11,776) Japanese, 0.77% (11,517) Russian, 0.72% (10,788) Korean, 0.70% (10,496) German, 0.66% (9,868) Italian, 0.64% (9,555) Hebrew, and African languages were spoken as a main language by 0.48% (7,158) of the population over the age of five. In total, 40.02% (602,058) of Manhattan's population age 5 and older spoke a mother language other than English.

== Religion ==
New York County is diverse religiously and ethnically. According to a report by The Association of Religion Data, the largest religious affiliation in Manhattan is the Roman Catholic Church, whose adherents constitute 564,505 persons (more than 36% of the population) and maintain 110 congregations. Jewish-Americans comprise the second largest religious group, with 314,500 persons (around 20.5%), and have 102 congregations. Other large denominations include Protestants (139,732 adherents) and Muslims (37,078).

== Population density ==
As of the 2020 census, the population density of New York County was 74,870.7 inhabitants per square mile (28,907.7/km^{2}), the highest population density of any county in the United States. In 1910, at the height of European immigration to New York, Manhattan's population density reached a peak of 101,548 people per square mile (39,208 people/km^{2}).

== Daytime population ==
Manhattan is a major focal point for incoming commuters and other visitors, raising the population of Manhattan during the day to 4 million people on average.

== See also ==
- Demographics of New York City
- Demographics of New York (state)
