= Demographics of Queens =

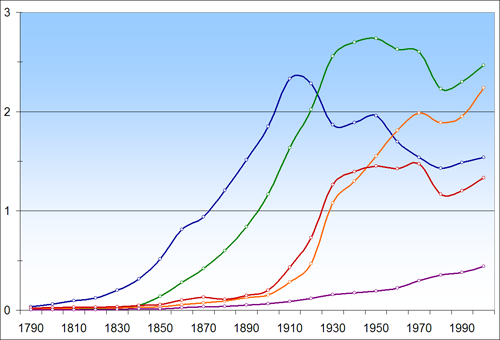
Queens' population has recently been growing faster than Brooklyn's. Key: The Bronx, Brooklyn, Manhattan, Queens, Staten Island

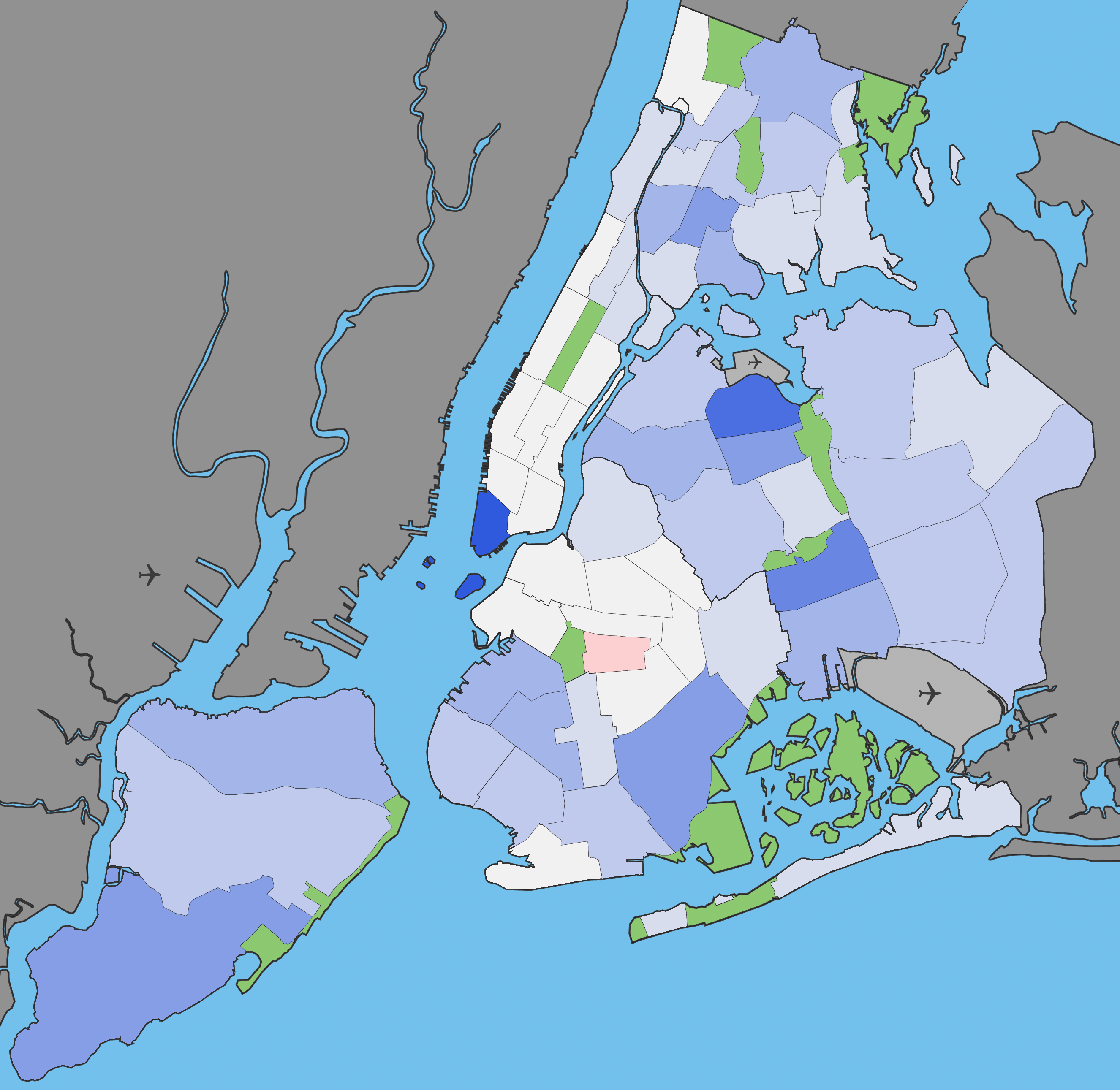
Queens grew at a faster rate than Brooklyn, Manhattan, and the Bronx from 1990 to 2000. (Click on image to see full key and data.)

The demographics of Queens, the second-most populous borough in New York City, are highly diverse. No racial or ethnic group holds a majority in the borough.

Coterminous with Queens County since 1899, the borough of Queens is the second-largest in population (behind Brooklyn), with approximately 2.3 million residents in 2013, approximately 48% of them foreign-born; Queens County is also the second most populous county in New York State, behind neighboring Kings County, which is coterminous with the borough of Brooklyn. Queens is the fourth-most densely populated county among New York City's boroughs, as well as in the United States; and if each New York City borough were an independent city, Queens would also be the nation's fourth most populous city, after Los Angeles, Chicago, and Brooklyn. Some say Queens is the most ethnically diverse urban area in the world.

== General statistics ==
Queens County Historical Population Figures
Census Year	Queens (old)	Nassau portion	Queens (new)	% increase
1698	3,565			
1771	10,980			
1790	16,014	9,855	6,159	-
1800	16,916	10,274	6,642	7.8%
1810	19,336	11,892	7,444	12.1%
1820	21,519	13,273	8,246	10.8%
1830	22,460	13,411	9,049	9.7%
1840	30,324	15,844	14,480	60.0%
1850	36,833	18,240	18,593	28.4%
1860	57,391	24,488	32,903	77.0%
1870	73,803	28,335	45,468	38.2%
1880	90,574	34,015	56,559	24.4%
1890	128,059	41,009	87,050	53.9%
1900			152,999	75.8%
1910			284,041	85.6%
1920			469,042	65.1%
1930			1,079,129	130.1%
1940			1,297,634	20.2%
1950			1,550,849	19.5%
1960			1,809,578	16.7%
1970			1,986,473	9.8%
1980			1,891,325	-4.8%
1990			1,951,598	3.2%
2000			2,229,379	14.2%
2010			2,230,722	0.1%
2020			2,405,464	7.8%

=== 2020s ===
Since 2021, the population of Queens was estimated by the Census Bureau to have decreased 0.9% to 2,287,390 as of 2021, representing 27.3% of New York City's population, and 11.7% of New York State's population. In the 2020 census data from New York City Department of City Planning, there were a total population of 2,405,464 residents. Within the Queens total population, there were 549,358 White residents making up 22.8%, 381,375 Black residents making up 15.9%, 656,583 Asian residents making up 27.3%, and 667,861 Hispanic residents making up 27.8% of all residents. Hispanic and Asian populations for the first time in Queens history now are at almost equal populations and together make up the vast majority of the immigrant populations, as well as a slight majority of the total population. The Black population is now in the lowest ranking single-race group while the White population is now second lowest . Queens ranks as most culturally and racially diverse borough in all of New York City, followed by Brooklyn, Manhattan, The Bronx, and Staten Island, respectively.

=== 2010s ===
==== 2013 ====
Since 2010, the population of Queens was estimated by the Census Bureau to have increased 2.9% to 2,296,175 as of 2013, representing 27.3% of New York City's population, and 11.7% of New York State's population.

==== 2012 ====
According to 2012 census estimates, 27.2% of the population was White, 20.9% Black or African American, 24.8% Asian, 12.9% from some other race, and 2.7% of two or more races. 27.9% of Queens's population was of Hispanic or Latino origin (of any race).

==== 2010 ====
According to the 2010 Census, 39.7% of the population was White, 19.1% Black or African American, 22.9% Asian, 13.7% from some other race, and 4.5% of two or more races. 27.5% of Queens's population was of Hispanic, Latino, or Spanish origin (they may be of any race).

=== 2000s ===
==== 2009 ====
According to the 2009 American Community Survey, whites made up 46.1% of Queens' population, of which 30.2% were non-Hispanic whites. Blacks made up 18.8% of Queens' population, of which 17.6% were non-Hispanic blacks. Native Americans represented 0.5% of the population. Asians represented 22.0% of the population. Multiracial individuals comprised 2.4% of the population. Hispanics or Latinos made up 26.9% of Queens' population.

==== 2005–2006 ====
In 2005, the median income among black households in Queens was close to $52,000 a year, surpassing that of whites. As of 2006, no other county in the country with a population over 65,000 can make that claim.

==== 2000 ====
As of the census of 2000, the population of Queens was 2,229,379 people, 782,664 households, and 537,690 families residing in the county. The population density was 7,879.6 people/km^{2} (20,408 people/mi^{2}). There were 817,250 housing units at an average density of 2,888.5 units/km^{2} (7,481 units/mi^{2}).In the year 2000, the racial makeup of the county was 44.08% White, 20.01% Black or African American, 0.50% Native American, 17.56% Asian, 0.06% Pacific Islander, 11.68% from other races, and 6.11% from two or more races. 24.97% of the population were Hispanic or Latino of any race. There were 782,664 households, out of which 31.5% included children under the age of 18; 46.9% were married couples living together, 16.0% had a female householder with no husband present, and 31.3% were non-families. 25.6% of all households were made up of individuals, and 9.7% had someone living alone who was 65 years of age or older. The average household size was 2.81 and the average family size was 3.39.

In the county, the population was spread out, with 22.8% under the age of 18, 9.6% from 18 to 24, 33.1% from 25 to 44, 21.7% from 45 to 64, and 12.7% who were 65 years of age or older. The median age was 35 years. For every 100 females there were 92.9 males. For every 100 females age 18 and over, there were 89.6 males.

The median income for a household in the county was $42,439, and the median income for a family was $48,608. Males had a median income of $35,576 versus $31,628 for females. The per capita income for the county was $19,222. About 11.9% of families and 14.6% of the population were below the poverty line, including 18.8% of those under age 18 and 13.0% of those age 65 or over.

== Race and ethnicity ==
Queens County, New York – Racial and ethnic composition Note: the US Census treats Hispanic/Latino as an ethnic category. This table excludes Latinos from the racial categories and assigns them to a separate category. Hispanics/Latinos may be of any race.
Race / Ethnicity (NH = Non-Hispanic)	Pop 1980	Pop 1990	Pop 2000	Pop 2010	Pop 2020	% 1980	% 1990	% 2000	% 2010	% 2020
White alone (NH)	1,172,511	937,557	732,895	616,727	549,358	61.99%	48.04%	32.87%	27.65%	22.84%
Black or African American alone (NH)	341,059	390,842	422,831	395,881	381,375	18.03%	20.03%	18.97%	17.75%	15.85%
Native American or Alaska Native alone (NH)	2,814	5,606	6,275	6,490	9,576	0.15%	0.29%	0.28%	0.29%	0.40%
Asian alone (NH)	93,780	229,830	389,303	508,334	656,583	4.96%	11.78%	17.46%	22.79%	27.30%
Native Hawaiian or Pacific Islander alone (NH)	x	x	861	1,094	1,110	x	x	0.04%	0.05%	0.05%
Other race alone (NH)	18,739	6,643	28,098	32,339	55,489	0.99%	0.34%	1.26%	1.45%	2.31%
Mixed race or Multiracial (NH)	x	x	92,511	56,107	84,112	x	x	4.15%	2.52%	3.50%
Hispanic or Latino (any race)	262,422	381,120	556,605	613,750	667,861	13.88%	19.53%	24.97%	27.51%	27.76%
Total	1,891,325	1,951,598	2,229,379	2,230,722	2,405,464	100.00%	100.00%	100.00%	100.00%	100.00%

== White and European population ==
Over 1,060,000 whites reside in Queens, of which some 697,000 are non-Hispanic whites. A significant amount of the European American population is of Italian and Irish descent. Sizable populations of Germans and Poles are also present, as well as Greeks, Albanians, Serbs, Bosnians, and Russians. The White population in Queens is mainly concentrated in neighborhoods such as Astoria, Forest Hills, Rego Park, Glendale, Maspeth, Middle Village, Howard Beach, Kew Gardens, Kew Gardens Hills, Bayside, Whitestone, Douglaston, Little Neck, Glen Oaks, Breezy Point and Belle Harbor. The top ten European ancestries are the following:

- Italian: 7.7% (178,080)
- Irish: 5.0% (115,345)
- German: 3.5% (79,917)
- Polish: 2.9% (66,718)
- Greek: 2.3% (53,342)
- Russian: 2.1% (47,842)
- English: 1.0% (23,550)
- French: 0.6% (14,913)
- Hungarian: 0.5% (10,658)
- Ukrainian: 0.4% (9,405)

The White and European population declined from 616,727 residents at 27.6% in 2010 to 549,358 residents at 22.8% in 2020, a loss of -67,369 or -10.9%.

There is also a Romanian community in Queens.

== Black and African American population ==
Black people make up a large portion of Queens' population. According to the 2009 American Community Survey, Black people of both Hispanic and non-Hispanic origin made up 18.8% of Queens' population. As of 2010, Black people of non-Hispanic origin formed 17.7% non-Hispanic of the population. Over 434,300 black people reside in Queens, of which some 406,000 are non-Hispanic. In addition, 23,527 people identified themselves as "Sub-Saharan African" in the survey, which is equal to 1.0% of the population. Black people are the majority in Queensbridge and LeFrak City but primarily concentrated in the Southeast Queens neighborhoods of South Jamaica, Springfield Gardens, Hollis, Laurelton, Cambria Heights, Locust Manor, St. Albans, Rosedale, and Far Rockaway.

The Black and African American population declined from 395,881 residents at 17.7% in 2010 to 381,375 residents at 15.9% in 2020, a loss of -14,506 residents or -3.7%.

== Native American population ==
Native Americans are a very small minority in Queens. Of the borough's 2.3 million people, roughly 11,200 are Native American, which is equivalent to just 0.5% of the total population. However, people who identify as Native American with another racial group (and those who are Native American alone) make up 1.1% of the population, which is roughly 25,700 people.

== Asian population ==
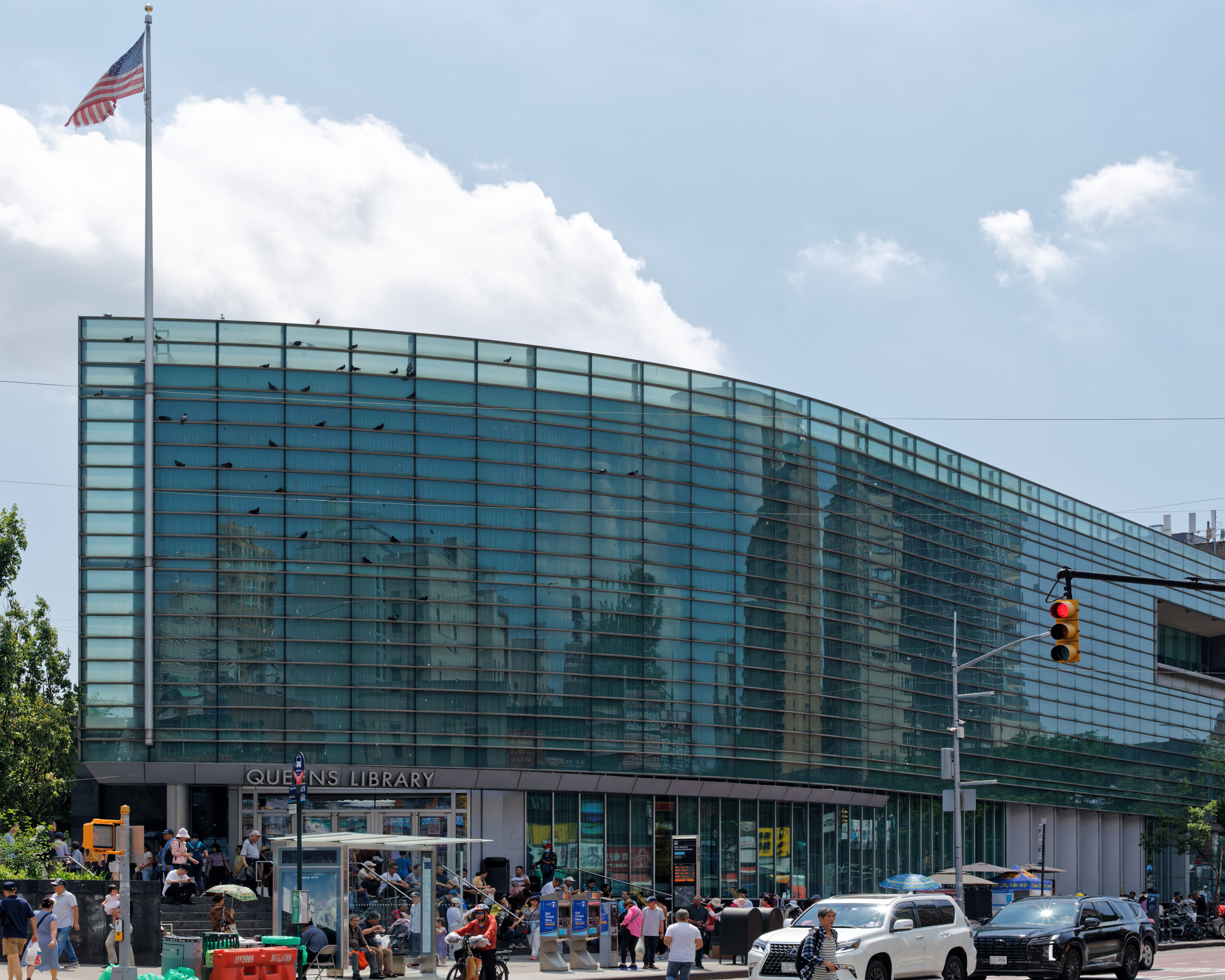
Queens Library in Flushing Chinatown

Asians have a large presence in Queens, and Queens has the largest Asian American population by county outside the Western United States; according to the 2006 American Community Survey, Queens ranks fifth among US counties, with 477,772 Asian Americans making up 21.18% of the population. Over one-in-five residents (22.0%) are of Asian descent. As of 2023, illegal Chinese immigration to New York City, and particularly to Queens and its Flushing Chinatown, has accelerated. Over 506,000 Asians live in the borough. The bulk of this group are composed of people of Chinese, Indian, Korean, and Filipino descent. Asians are numerous throughout the borough but most concentrated in Northeastern and Central Queens in areas such as Flushing, Little Neck, Bayside, Fresh Meadows, Jamaica Estates, Elmhurst, Woodside, Richmond Hill, and Ozone Park. The following list provides more information on these four ethnic groups:

- Chinese: (395,009)
- Indian: (377,696)
- Korean: (52,690)
- Filipino: (40,113)

The 2000 census also showed that the borough is home to one of the most important concentration of Indian Americans in the nation, with a total population of 329,715. Similarly, it also has a visible presence of Bangladeshi Americans with a population of 88,310 (0.82% of the borough's population) and Pakistani Americans with a population of 75,604 ( 0.7% of the borough's population). There is also a large population of Afghan Americans, which reside predominantly in Flushing and Jackson Heights, and there is also a large portion of Arab Americans which live in Astoria concentrated in and around Steinway, with groups of Moroccan Americans, Egyptian Americans, Lebanese Americans, Algerian Americans and Syrian Americans. The neighborhoods of Forest Hills, Queens, and Rego Park are home to a large amount of Central Asians, particularly Bukharian Jews from Uzbekistan and Tajikistan. There is also a large population of Indo-Guyanese and Indo-Trinidadian people in Richmond Hill, Queens, Ozone Park, and South Ozone Park (Wayback Machine).

There are another ten Asian American groups in Queens that number over 1,000 individuals. The largest Asian American group in Queens in the year 2000 were the Chinese, numbering at 143,126 members. Those of Korean descent numbered at 63,885 in the borough. There were 33,225 people of Filipino ancestry in Queens. The borough is also home to 5,957 Japanese Americans. Those of Vietnamese, Sri Lankan, Malaysian, Indonesian, Thai, and Taiwanese descent also all numbered over 1,000, but under 5,000. In 2022, the New York City Council designated an official "Little Thailand" three-block strip within Elmhurst.

=== Notable people ===
- Bill Lann Lee, American civil rights lawyer and former United States Assistant Attorney General
- Charles Wang, American businessman and philanthropist
- David Ren, film director, writer, & producer
- Grace Meng, American lawyer and first member of U.S. House of Representatives of Asian descent to represent New York
- James S.C. Chao, American entrepreneur and philanthropist, father of 18th United States Secretary of Transportation Elaine Chao
- James Kyson Lee, American actor
- Jessi (musician), Korean-American Rapper & songwriter based in South Korea
- John Liu, 43rd New York City Comptroller and former candidate of the 2013 New York City mayoral election
- Julie Chen Moonves, American news anchor and talk show host for CBS
- Lucy Liu, American actress
- Peter Koo, American politician and pharmacist, Founder of Starwide Drugs
- Ron Kim, American politician
- Sandra Lee, dermatologist

From 2010 to 2020, the Asian population experienced a growth from 508,334 residents at 22.8% to 656,583 residents at 27.3%, a gain of 148,249 residents or 29.2% surpassing the Hispanic population as the fastest growing racial group as well as they are almost at the same equivalent population as the Hispanic population.

== Hispanic and Latino population ==
Hispanic and Latino Americans make up over one-quarter of Queens' population. As of 2010, 27.5% of Queens's population was of Hispanic, Latino, or Spanish origin (they may be of any race). Over 620,000 Hispanics and Latinos call the borough home. Over 145,500 Colombians (6.4% of the population) 123,200 Puerto Ricans (5.3% of the population) and 83,180 Mexicans (3.6% of the population) live in the borough, in addition to over 13,400 Cubans (0.6% of the population). Over 400,300 people are of other Hispanic and Latino ethnicities, such as Dominican, Salvadoran, Ecuadorian and other nationalities. These people collectively make up 17.4% of the population. Hispanics are numerous throughout the borough but concentrated most in Central Queens neighborhoods such as Corona, Jackson Heights, Elmhurst, East Elmhurst, Woodside, Ridgewood, Woodhaven, Flushing, and Ozone Park. The following list provides more information on these ethnic groups:

- Colombians 146,000 (6.5%)
- Puerto Ricans 123,000 (5.4%)
- Ecuadorians 108,000 (4.8%)
- Mexicans 81,000 (3.6%)
- Dominicans 68,000 (3.1%)
- Other 125,000 (5.5%)

This Hispanic population experienced increase from 613,750 residents at 27.5% in 2010 to 667,861 residents at 27.8% in 2020, a gain of 54,111 residents of 8.8%. For a long time, the Hispanic population was the fastest growing population in the borough, but since the 2000s to 2010s, the Asian population has taken over that status and now slowly beginning to challenge the Hispanic population as the largest immigrant population of the borough.

== Multiracial population ==
Multiracial individuals are a small but sizable minority group in Queens. Over 55,540 multiracial individuals reside in the borough, which is equal to 2.4% of the population. People of mixed Caucasian and black heritage number over 8,840 members and make up 0.4% of the population. People of mixed Caucasian and Native American heritage number over 4,100 members and make up 0.2% of the population. People of mixed Caucasian and Asian heritage number over 8,060 members and make up 0.3% of the population. Lastly, people of mixed black and Native American heritage number over 2,550 and make up 0.1% of the population. From 2010 to 2020, the multiracial population went from 56,107 residents at 2.5% to 84,112 residents at 3.5%, a gain of 28,005 residents or 49.9%.

== Languages ==
As of 2010, 43.84% (905,890) of Queens residents age 5 and older spoke English at home as a primary language, while 23.88% (493,462) spoke Spanish, 8.06% (166,570) Chinese, 3.44% (71,054) various Indic languages, 2.74% (56,701) Korean, 1.67% (34,596) Russian, 1.56% (32,268) Italian, 1.54% (31,922) Tagalog, 1.53% (31,651) Greek, 1.32% (27,345) French Creole, 1.17% (24,118) Polish, 0.96% (19,868) Hindi, 0.93% (19,262) Urdu, 0.92% (18,931) other Asian languages, 0.80% (16,435) other Indo-European languages, 0.71% (14,685) French, 0.61% (12,505) Arabic, 0.48% (10,008) Serbo-Croatian, and Hebrew was spoken as a main language by 0.46% (9,410) of the population over the age of five. In total, 56.16% (1,160,483) of Queens's population age 5 and older spoke a mother language other than English.

== See also ==
- Demographics of New York City
