= Demographics of Staten Island =

Staten Island
- Borough of New York City
- Richmond County
- Location of Staten Island shown in orange.
- Country: United States
- State: New York
- County: Richmond
- City: New York City

Area
  - Total: 102.50 sq mi (265.5 km^{2})
  - Land: 58.48 sq mi (151.5 km^{2})
  - Water: 44.02 sq mi (114.0 km^{2})

Population (2020)
  - Total: 495,747
  - Density: 8,163.1/sq mi (3,151.8/km^{2})

Richmond County, also known as Staten Island, is a borough of New York City, New York, United States. Staten Island is the least populated of the five boroughs, with 495,747 people, but is the third largest in area, at 59 sq mi (153 km^{2}).

As of the 2020 census, there were 495,747 people living on Staten Island, which was an increase of 5.6% from the 2000 census.

Notably, despite Staten Island being the least populous of the five boroughs of New York City, the island still has a greater population than large, independent cities such as Raleigh, Oakland, St. Louis, Miami, and New Orleans.

== Demographics ==
=== 2020 census ===
Staten Island / Richmond County, New York – Racial and ethnic composition Note: the US Census treats Hispanic/Latino as an ethnic category. This table excludes Latinos from the racial categories and assigns them to a separate category. Hispanics/Latinos may be of any race.
Race / Ethnicity (NH = Non-Hispanic)	Pop 1980	Pop 1990	Pop 2000	Pop 2010	Pop 2020	% 1980	% 1990	% 2000	% 2010	% 2020
White alone (NH)	300,511	303,081	316,316	300,169	277,981	85.34%	79.97%	71.29%	64.04%	56.07%
Black or African American alone (NH)	24,480	28,172	39,704	44,313	46,835	6.95%	7.43%	8.95%	9.45%	9.45%
Native American or Alaska Native alone (NH)	383	611	599	695	624	0.11%	0.16%	0.13%	0.15%	0.13%
Asian alone (NH)	6,709	16,483	24,786	34,697	58,753	1.91%	4.35%	5.59%	7.40%	11.85%
Native Hawaiian or Pacific Islander alone (NH)	x	x	119	137	135	x	x	0.03%	0.03%	0.03%
Other race alone (NH)	1,154	391	857	1,028	3,141	0.33%	0.10%	0.19%	0.22%	0.63%
Mixed race or Multiracial (NH)	x	x	7,797	6,640	11,318	x	x	1.76%	1.42%	2.28%
Hispanic or Latino (any race)	18,884	30,239	53,550	81,051	96,960	5.36%	7.98%	12.07%	17.29%	19.56%
Total	352,121	378,977	443,728	468,730	495,747	100.00%	100.00%	100.00%	100.00%	100.00%

Out of all of the boroughs of New York City, Staten Island has the lowest population concentration, and as of the 2020 census data from the New York City Department of City Planning, there were a total population of 495,747 residents with 277,981 White residents making up 56.1%, 96,960 Hispanic residents making up 19.6%, 58,753 Asian residents making up 11.9%, and 46,835 Black residents making up 9.4%. Through most of the 20th century, NYC has long been dominantly populated by European American White enclaves, but starting in the 1970s and moving forward, there was a rapid increasing changing cultural and racial diversity in the city and by the 1980s going forward, Non-White enclaves became the dominant majority of the city while the overall white population fell under 50% including in each other borough; however, Staten Island is the only and last borough of NYC that is still retaining a more than 50% White European American majority despite the increasing cultural and racial diversity. However, Staten Island's White population has been steadily declining from 300,169 residents at 64.0% in 2010 to 277,981 at 56.1% in 2020, a loss of 22,188 or 7.4%. Meanwhile, other racial populations are increasing with the Black population increasing from 44,313 residents at 9.5% in 2010 to 46,835 residents at 9.4% in 2020, a gain of 2,522 residents or 5.7%, though due to other racial population increases in the borough, the percentage portion of the Black residents out of the total Staten Island population slightly declined. The Hispanic population went from 81,051 residents at 17.3% in 2010 to 96,960 residents at 19.6%, a gain of 15,909 residents or 19.6%, and the Asian population experienced the largest increase from 34,697 residents at 7.4% in 2010 to 58,753 residents at 11.9% in 2020, a gain of 24,056 residents or 69.3%.

=== 2000 census ===
At the 2000 census, there were 443,728 people, 156,341 households, and 114,052 families residing in the borough/county. The population density was 2,929.6 people/km^{2} (7,588 people/mi^{2}). There were 163,993 housing units at an average density of 1,082.7 units/km^{2} (2,804 units/mi^{2}). The racial makeup was 77.6% White, 9.7% Black or African American, 0.2% Native American, 5.7% Asian, 0.04% Pacific Islander, 4.1% from other races, and 2.7% from two or more races. Hispanic or Latino of any race were 12.1% of the population.

Staten Island Compared
2000 Census	Staten Island	NY City	NY State
Total population	443,728	8,008,278	18,976,457
Population density	7,587.9/mi^{2}	26,403/mi^{2}	402/mi^{2}
Median household income (1999)	$55,039	$38,293	$43,393
Per capita income	$23,905	$22,402	$23,389
Bachelor's degree or higher	27%	27%	24%
Foreign born	21%	36%	20%
White	78%	44%	62%
Black	10%	27%	16%
Hispanic (any race)	12%	27%	14%
Asian	6%	10%	6%

There were 156,341 households, out of which 35.8% had children under the age of 18 living with them, 55.0% were married couples living together, 13.9% had a female householder with no husband present, and 27.0% were non-families. 23.2% of all households were made up of individuals, and 8.4% had someone living alone who was 65 years of age or older. The average household size was 2.78 and the average family size was 3.31.

The population was spread out, with 25.5% under the age of 18, 8.5% from 18 to 24, 30.9% from 25 to 44, 23.4% from 45 to 64, and 11.6% who were 65 years of age or older. The median age was 36 years. For every 100 females there were 93.6 males. For every 100 females age 18 and over, there were 89.6 males.

The median income for a household was $55,039, and the median income for a family was $64,333. Males had a median income of $50,081 versus $35,914 for females. The per capita income for the borough was $23,905. About 7.9% of families and 10.0% of the population were below the poverty line, including 13.2% of those under age 18 and 9.9% of those age 65 or over.

Since the 2000 census, a rather large Russian community has been growing in Staten Island, particularly in the South Beach and Great Kills area. The vast majority of the borough's African American and Hispanic residents live north of the Staten Island Expressway, or Interstate 278.

=== 2009 American Community Survey ===
Staten Island Population by year

Year	Inhabitants
1900	67,021
1910	85,969
1920	116,531
1930	158,346
1940	174,441
1950	191,555
1960	221,991
1970	295,443
1980	352,029
1990	378,977
2000	443,728
2010	468,730
2020	495,747

According to the 2009 American Community Survey conducted by the U.S. Census Bureau, Staten Island had a population 491,730, of which 48.7% were males and 51.3% were females. Approximately 6.0% of the population was under five years of age, and 76.9% of the populace was over eighteen years of age. One-eighth (12.5%) of the population was over sixty-five years of age. The median age was 38.4 years.

In terms of race, 98.1% of the population was of one race and 1.9% was of two or more races. The borough's population was 75.7% White (65.8% non-Hispanic White alone), 10.2% Black or African American (9.6% non-Hispanic Black or African American alone), 0.2% American Indian and Alaska Native, 7.4% Asian, 0.0% Native Hawaiian and Other Pacific Islander, 4.6% from Some other race, and 1.9% from Two or more races. Hispanics or Latinos of any race made up 15.9% of the population.

Whites were the racial majority in Staten Island. Of the borough's 491,000 people, over 382,000 were white, which was over three-quarters (75.7%) of the population. Over 323,000 non-Hispanic whites reside in the borough, and they make up 65.8% of the population. The Caucasian population was largely Italian and Irish. Sizable communities of Germans, Russians, Albanians and Poles were present. There were over 175,000 Italian Americans living in Staten Island, and they make up over one-third (35.7%) of the population. Roughly 65,000 Irish Americans live in the borough, and they make up over one-eighth (13.2%) of the population. People of German, Russian, and Polish descent make up 5.7, 3.8, and 3.4% of the population, respectively.

Compared to other New York City boroughs, Blacks were a relatively small percentage of Staten Island's residents. Only one out of every ten residents was Black compared to one out of every four residents in New York City overall. Of the borough's 50,000 Black residents, 47,000 were non-Hispanic, which was just under ten percent of the population. In addition, over 7,200 people identified themselves as "Sub-Saharan African" in the survey, which was equal to 1.5% of Staten Island's total population.

American Indians were a very small minority in Staten Island. Of the borough's 491,000 inhabitants, just over 900 were Native American. Overall, indigenous peoples make up only 0.2% of the population. People of mixed white and Native American ancestry & mixed black and Native American ancestry collectively outnumber people who were Native American alone. Over 630 people were of mixed Caucasian and Native American heritage, and over 410 people were of mixed African American and Native American heritage.

Asians were a smaller minority group compared to blacks and Hispanics, but they were visible and growing. Over 36,600 Asians call Staten Island home, and they represent 7.4% of the borough's population. Chinese Americans and Indian Americans were the two main Asian ethnic groups. Over 12,100 Chinese Americans and 10,000 Indian Americans live in the conurbation. People of Chinese and Indian descent make up 2.5 and 2.0% of the population, respectively. Over 7,700 Filipinos reside here, making up 1.6% of the population. Staten Island was also home to the nations highest percentages of Sri Lankans. The "Little Sri Lanka" in the Tompkinsville neighborhood of Staten Island was one of the largest Sri Lankan communities outside of the country of Sri Lanka itself.

Hispanics and Latinos were the largest minority group in Staten Island, and they're the second largest group after non-Hispanic whites. Over 78,000 Hispanics and Latinos live in the borough, and they make up 15.9% of the population. Puerto Ricans were the most numerous of the Hispanic subgroups; the borough's 35,600 Puerto Ricans make up 7.2% of its population. In addition, the borough's 15,300 Mexicans make up 3.1% of its population; over 1,200 Cubans form just 0.3% of Staten Island's population. In addition, over 26,100 people were of other Hispanic and Latino ethnicities, such as Dominican, Salvadoran, Ecuadorian, etc.

Approximately 80.0% of the population was native and 20.0% was foreign-born. About 78.2% of the population was born in the United States, and 1.8% was born in Puerto Rico, U.S. Island areas, or abroad to American parents. The 98,000 foreign-born make up one-fifth of the population. Approximately 34.7% of the foreign-born population was born in Europe, 29.4% was born in Asia, 27.6% was born in Latin America, 7.8% was born in Africa, 0.4% was born in other parts of North America, and 0.1% was born in Oceania.

Approximately 71.4% of the population over five years of age spoke English only at home, so 28.6% of the population spoke non-English languages. In addition, 10.1% of the population spoke Spanish, and 12.1% spoke other Indo-European languages. Lastly, 4.6% of the populace spoke an Asian language.

=== 2010 census ===
According to the 2010 Census, 64.0% of the population was non-Hispanic White, 9.5% non-Hispanic Black or African American, 0.0% non-Hispanic American Indian and Alaska Native, 7.4% non-Hispanic Asian, 0.2% from some other race (non-Hispanic) and 2.6% of two or more races (non-Hispanic). 17.3% of Staten Island's population was of Hispanic, Latino, or Spanish origin.

== Major racial groups ==
=== Italian Americans ===
Staten Island has a higher percentage of Italian Americans than any other county in the United States, though it is 27th largest compared to other Italian American communities.

About 25% of Staten Island's residents have Italian origin, down meaningfully from 33% back in 2010. The South Shore of Staten Island has the highest proportion of Italians. Nearly 70% of the South Shore reports Italian ancestry. Several neighborhoods in the southernmost portion of the island are over 90% Italian.

A large number of Italian Americans and their descendants on Staten Island are transplants who migrated from Brooklyn in the 1960s following the construction of the Verrazzano–Narrows Bridge in 1964. Only a few are Italian-born.

Many of these Italian residents claim Sicilian ancestry and some can trace their roots back to Castellammare del Golfo, Sicily.

=== Irish Americans ===
Irish Americans make up 9.6% of Staten Island. They are the second largest population of European ancestry on Staten Island. Staten Island has large enclaves of Irish Americans scattered throughout the borough but mainly concentrated on the North Shore. The neighborhoods of Westerleigh, West Brighton, New Brighton, Randall Manor, and St George have large Irish American populations. These tightly knit communities have remained densely populated with Irish Americans for over 100 years.

=== Asian Americans ===
According to the 2010 Census, Staten Island has a 7.4% non-Hispanic Asian population. The Asian population was mostly concentrated in the areas alongside the Staten Island Expressway. The area around Bradley Avenue has the highest concentration of Asians on Staten Island (Census tract 187.02 has a 24% Asian population, and census tract 189.02 has a 23% Asian population). Other areas with a small concentration of Asians were Graniteville, Willowbrook, Concord, Castleton Corners, Park Hill, Rosebank, South Beach, and Grasmere. There was also a small Asian concentration in Mariners' Harbor (Census Tract 231 was 13% Asian). In 2024, some reports came out that there has been an increasing influx of Chinese homeowners moving into many parts of the borough, but the New Dorp neighborhood has been significantly mentioned as having an emerging Staten Island Chinatown on New Dorp Lane due to the increasing influx of authentic Chinese owned businesses opening up from professional and educational services, food stores, eateries, pharmacies, and H&L Supermarket opened up on Hylan Boulevard as a large Chinese supermarket to cater to the growing Chinese population.

=== Hispanic Americans ===
Staten Island's Hispanic population was 17.3% as of the 2010 census. While Hispanics can be found in most Staten Island neighborhoods, their concentrations were highest north of the Staten Island Expressway. Roughly half of Staten Island's Hispanics were of Puerto Rican descent. However, the majority of the Hispanics residing in the Port Richmond area were Mexican:

There were 2 census tracts with a Hispanic majority. Census tract 207 in northern Port Richmond was 53% Hispanic, and census tract 133.02 in northern West Brighton was 51% Hispanic. Census tract 213 in Port Richmond was 45% Hispanic, though the Hispanic percentage was brought down due to the area east of Port Richmond Avenue being majority White (though with a noticeable Hispanic presence). Other neighborhoods with a large Hispanic population include Mariners' Harbor, Arlington, Elm Park, Graniteville, New Brighton, St. George, Ward Hill, Stapleton, Park Hill, and Rosebank.

Hispanics were the fastest growing ethnic group on Staten Island. The Hispanic population has increased 51% between the 2000 & 2010 census.

=== African Americans ===
Staten Island has the lowest percentage of Black residents as of the 2010 census, at only 9.5%. Most African Americans reside north of the Staten Island Expressway. The only census tracts having Black majorities were tracts 319.01, 319.02, and 133.01. Tract 133.01 is the West Brighton Houses (though a few residential homes along Alaska Street were also included), and census tracts 319.01 & 319.02 were in the western portion of Mariners' Harbor (Tract 319.02 was often referred to as Arlington). Back in 2000, tracts 4 & 29 in Park Hill/Stapleton had a Black majority, but that was no longer the case, due to an increasing Hispanic and Asian population in the area.

Some other areas had a noticeable Black presence, although Blacks do not make up the majority (or even a plurality in most cases). These neighborhoods include Mariners' Harbor, Elm Park, Port Richmond, West New Brighton, New Brighton, St. George, Tompkinsville, Stapleton, Ward Hill, Park Hill & Sandy Ground as well as a growing population in Graniteville.

While many African Americans living on Staten Island were descendants of Southern-born migrants of The Great Migration, a small contingent of free African Americans settled in Sandy Ground in the 1830s. Aside from this, others were American-born transplants from other boroughs and Southern and Midwestern states. Others were immigrants, or descendants of immigrants, from West Africa and the Caribbean.

The island houses more Liberians than anywhere outside Liberia, and has included three Liberian heads of state: David D. Kpormakpor, Ruth Perry, and George Weah.

== Languages ==
As of 2010, 70.39% (306,310) of Staten Island residents age 5 and older spoke English at home as a primary language, while 10.02% (43,587) spoke Spanish, 3.14% (13,665) Russian, 3.11% (13,542) Italian, 2.39% (10,412) Chinese, 1.81% (7,867) other Indo-European languages, 1.38% (5,990) Arabic, 1.01% (4,390) Polish, 0.88% (3,812) Korean, 0.80% (3,500) Tagalog, 0.76% (3,308) other Asian languages, 0.62% (2,717) Urdu, 0.57% (2,479) other Indic languages, and African languages were spoken as a main language by 0.56% (2,458) of the population over the age of five. In total, 29.61% (128,827) of Staten Island's population age 5 and older spoke a mother language other than English.

== Religion ==
In terms of religion, the population is largely Roman Catholic, and the Catholic Church exerts strong influence on many aspects of the island's social and cultural life. The Jewish community is large enough that it would be significant in most other parts of the country, but it is slightly less numerous compared to other parts of the New York metropolitan area.
