= Daytime population =

Sociological concept used to study population

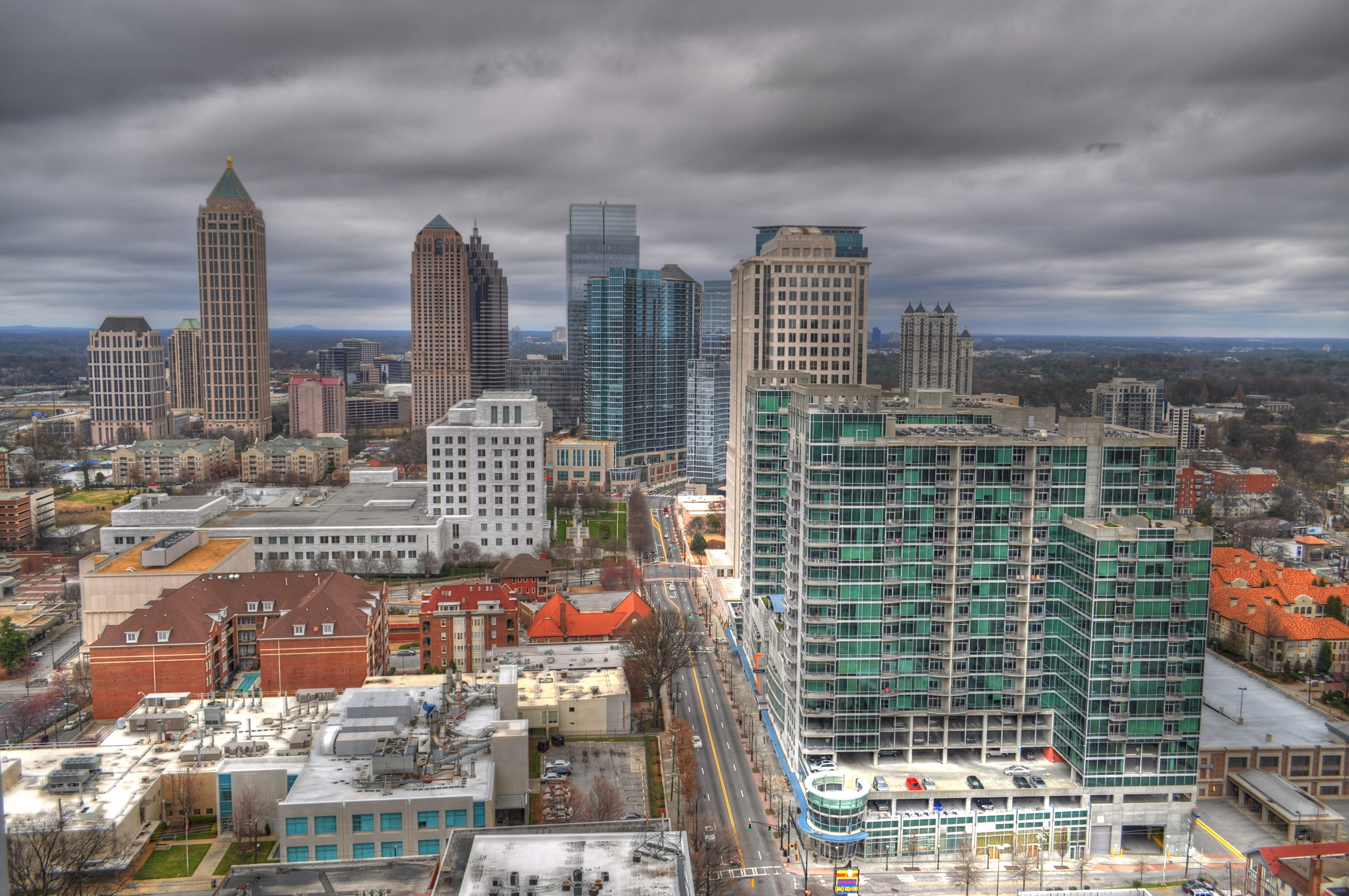
The city of Atlanta, Georgia, was reported to have a daytime population of 676,431 in 2000, a 62.4% increase over the residential population of 416,474, making it the largest gain in daytime population in the country among cities with fewer than 500,000 residents.

Daytime population, also known as commuter-adjusted population, is a demographic concept used in sociology referring to the number of people who are present in an area, typically a city or urban area, during normal business hours (daytime), including residents and commuters from areas outside the city or urban area. This is in contrast to the resident population in the same area, who are present during the nighttime hours.

The concept of a daytime population is often used to measure and study by governmental and private research firms to look at a city's or urban area's consumer base, and give conclusions on the area's potential for retail and economic expansion. Private companies, i.e. retail franchises and restaurant chains, typically have requirements of a minimum daytime population for company locations to be built in that area it is studying.
