= Demographics of the Bronx =

Historical population
Census	Pop.	Note	%±
1860	23,593		—
1870	37,393		58.5%
1880	51,980		39.0%
1890	88,908		71.0%
1900	200,507		125.5%
1910	430,980		114.9%
1920	732,016		69.8%
1930	1,265,258		72.8%
1940	1,394,711		10.2%
1950	1,451,277		4.1%
1960	1,424,815		−1.8%
1970	1,471,701		3.3%
1980	1,168,972		−20.6%
1990	1,203,789		3.0%
2000	1,332,650		10.7%
2010	1,385,108		3.9%
2020	1,472,654		6.3%
Sources below.

The demographics of the Bronx are characterized by a Hispanic majority (unique among New York City's boroughs) and by the lowest percentage of Whites among all boroughs.

== Race and ethnicity ==
Bronx County, New York – Racial and ethnic composition Note: the US Census treats Hispanic/Latino as an ethnic category. This table excludes Latinos from the racial categories and assigns them to a separate category. Hispanics/Latinos may be of any race.
Race / Ethnicity (NH = Non-Hispanic)	Pop 1980	Pop 1990	Pop 2000	Pop 2010	Pop 2020	% 1980	% 1990	% 2000	% 2010	% 2020
White alone (NH)	396,836	272,503	193,651	151,209	130,796	33.95%	22.64%	14.53%	10.92%	8.88%
Black or African American alone (NH)	348,744	369,113	416,338	416,695	419,393	29.83%	30.66%	31.24%	30.08%	28.48%
Native American or Alaska Native alone (NH)	2,409	3,445	3,488	3,460	3,087	0.21%	0.29%	0.26%	0.25%	0.21%
Asian alone (NH)	15,163	31,210	38,558	47,335	67,766	1.30%	2.59%	2.89%	3.42%	4.60%
Native Hawaiian or Pacific Islander alone (NH)	x	x	474	398	457	x	x	0.04%	0.03%	0.03%
Other race alone (NH)	9,467	4,407	8,227	8,636	16,322	0.81%	0.37%	0.62%	0.62%	1.11%
Mixed race or Multiracial (NH)	x	x	27,209	15,962	28,370	x	x	2.04%	1.15%	1.93%
Hispanic or Latino (any race)	396,353	523,111	644,705	741,413	806,463	33.91%	43.46%	48.38%	53.53%	54.76%
Total	1,168,972	1,203,789	1,332,650	1,385,108	1,472,654	100.00%	100.00%	100.00%	100.00%	100.00%

== Demographics from the 2020 Census ==
In the 2020 census data from New York City Department of City Planning, there was a total population of 1,472,654 residents with 806,463 Hispanic residents making up 54.8%, 419,393 Black residents making up 28.5%, 130,796 White residents making up 8.9%, and 67,766 Asian residents making up 4.6%. Hispanic and Black populations overwhelmingly made up the vast majority of the Borough, but the Hispanic population was nearly two times the size of the Black population. With the Hispanic making up a more than 50% majority in the borough, it is the largest concentration of Hispanic communities in NYC. Meanwhile, the other 3 boroughs like Manhattan, Brooklyn, and Queens had a more or less equal diverse racial and ethnic populations than The Bronx. Of all of the NYC boroughs, The Bronx has the highest overwhelming concentration of Non-White populations and it is the only borough in all of NYC to be almost exclusively populated by Non-White enclaves.

== 2013 estimates ==
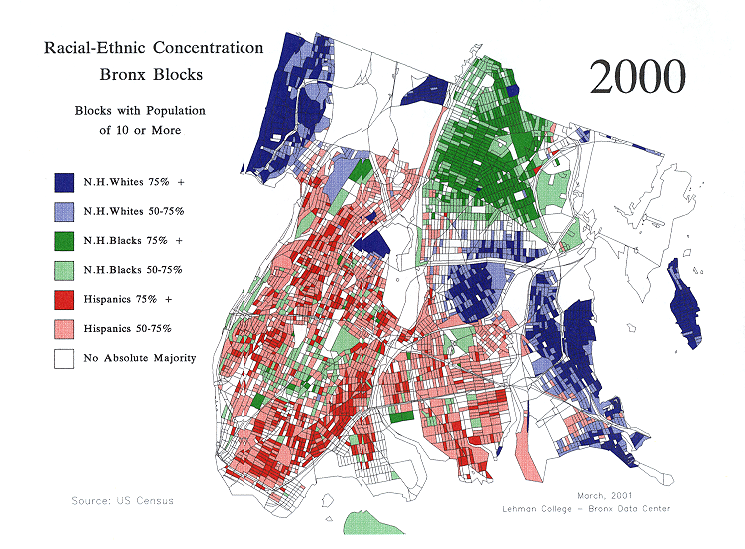
Racial/ethnic concentrations within the Bronx, by block. (Red indicates Hispanic of any race; Blue indicates non-Hispanic White; and Green indicates non-Hispanic Black or African-American.)

Racial composition	2013	1990	1970	1940
White	40.8%	35.7%	73.4%	98.3%
—Non-Hispanic	10.5%	22.6%	n/a	n/a
Black or African American	43.3%	37.3%	24.3%	1.7%
Hispanic or Latino (of any race)	54.6%	43.5%	27.7%	n/a
Asian	4.2%	3.0%	0.5%	0.1%
Other race	—N/a	23.5%	1.6%	(X)

According to a 2013 Census Bureau estimate, 45.8% of the Bronx's population was white, mostly Hispanic, 43.3% was black or African American, 4.2% Asian, 3.0% American Indian, 0.4% Pacific Islander, and 3.3% of two or more races. In addition, 54.6% of the population was of Hispanic or Latino origin, of any race.

The Census Bureau considers the Bronx to be the most diverse area in the country. There is an 89.7 percent chance that any two residents, chosen at random, would be of different race or ethnicity. The borough's formerly most populous racial group, white, declined from 98.3% in 1940 to 45.8% by 2012.

31.7% of the population were foreign born and another 8.9% were born in Puerto Rico, U.S. Island areas, or born abroad to American parents. 55.6% spoke a language other than English at home and 16.4% had a bachelor's degree or higher.

Approximately 44.3% of the population over the age of 5 speak only English at home, which is roughly 570,000 people. The majority (55.7%) of the population speak non-English languages at home. Over 580,600 people (45.2% of the population) speak Spanish at home.

== Demographics from the 2010 Census ==
According to the 2010 Census, 10.9% of the population was non-Hispanic White, 30.1% non-Hispanic Black or African American, 3.4% non-Hispanic Asian, 0.6% from some other race (non-Hispanic) and 1.2% of two or more races (non-Hispanic). 53.5% of Bronx's population was of Hispanic, Latino, or Spanish origin (they may be of any race). At the 2010 U.S. census, there were 1,385,108 people residing in Bronx, an increase of 3.9% since 2000. The U.S. Census considers the Bronx to be the most diverse area in the country. There is an 89.7 percent chance that any two residents, chosen at random, would be of different race or ethnicity.

== Demographics from the 2000 Census ==
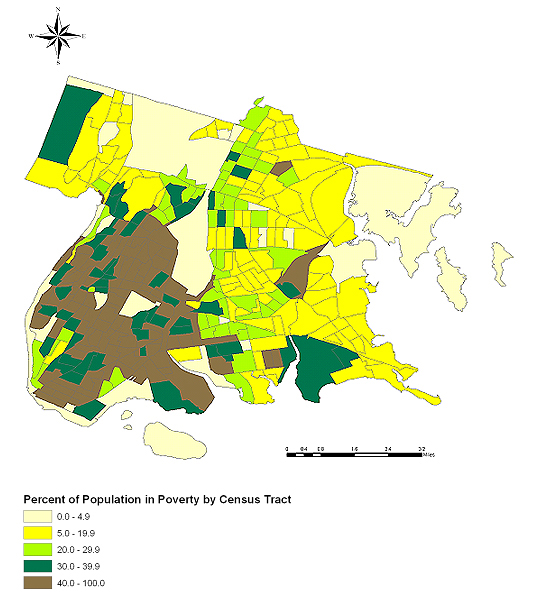
Poverty concentrations in the Bronx.

At the 2000 census there were 1,332,650 people, 463,212 households, and 314,984 families residing in the borough of The Bronx in New York City. The population density was 12,242.2 people/km^{2} (31,707 people/mi^{2}). There were 490,659 housing units at an average density of 4,507.4 units/km^{2} (11,674 units/mi^{2}). The racial makeup of the borough was 35.64% Black or African American, 29.87% White, 0.85% Native American, 3.01% Asian, 0.10% Pacific Islander, 24.74% from other races, and 5.78% from two or more races. 48.38% of the population were Hispanic or Latino of any race. 14.5% were whites, not of Hispanic origins. The Bronx has the largest number of Puerto Ricans of any county in the United States. It also has one of the highest percentages of Dominicans in the U.S. with 14.5%.

Based on sample data from the same census, the U.S. Census Bureau estimates that 47.29% of the population 5 and older speak only English at home. 43.67% speak Spanish at home, either exclusively or along with English. Other languages or groups of languages spoken at home by more than 0.25% of the population of the Bronx include Italian (1.36%), Kru, Ibo, or Yoruba (3.07%), French/French Creole (2.72%), and Albanian (2.54%). Of the 463,212 households, 38.1% had children under the age of 18 living with them, 31.4% were married couples living together, 30.4% had a female householder with no husband present, and 32.0% were non-families. 27.4% of households were one person, and 9.4% were one person aged 65 or older. The average household size was 2.78 and the average family size was 3.37.

In the borough the population was spread out, with 29.8% under the age of 18, 10.6% from 18 to 24, 30.7% from 25 to 44, 18.8% from 45 to 64, and 10.1% 65 or older. The median age was 31 years. For every 100 females there were 87.0 males. For every 100 females age 18 and older, there were 80.7 males.

The median household income was $27,611 and the median family income was $30,682. Males had a median income of $31,178 versus $29,429 for females. The per capita income for the borough was $13,959. About 28.0% of families and 30.7% of the population were below the poverty line, including 41.5% of those under age 18 and 21.3% of those age 65 or over.

== White population ==
Out of all five boroughs, The Bronx has the lowest number and percentage of non Hispanic white residents. At the 2009 American Community Survey, Whites, of both Hispanic and non-Hispanic origin, represented 24.4% of the population, while non-Hispanic Whites made 12.1% of the population. The 2010 Census puts the percentage of non-Hispanic Whites at 10.9% of the population.

The number of non-Hispanic Whites in the Bronx has been shrinking for decades. People of Irish descent number over 35,500 individuals and make up 2.6% of the population. German Americans and Polish Americans make up 1.4% and 0.8% of the population respectively.

Some main European ancestries of Bronx residents, 2000 (percentage of total borough population):

- Italian : 5.2%
- Irish : 3.2%
- Albanian : 2.54%
- German : 1.3%

From 2010 to 2020, the White population declined from 151,209 residents at 10.9% to 130,796 residents at 8.9%, a loss of -20,413 or -13.5%.

== Black and African American population ==
At the 2009 American Community Survey, Black people represented 37.5% of the population, with 30.8% being non-Hispanic Black people. Over 526,200 black people reside in the borough, of which 419,600 are non-Hispanic black people. Over 61,000 people identified themselves as "Sub-Saharan African" in the survey, making up 4.4% of the population. Those whose ancestors have been in the United States since before the end of slavery are one group. Another is those of Caribbean ancestry. Colin Powell, a son of Jamaican immigrants, grew up in the Bronx. Some people have ancestries from both these groups, and like most African-American communities many people in both these groups have European and Native American ancestry as well. A third group, more internally diverse than these other two, is African immigrants. They hail primarily from West Africa. There is also a small East African/Ethiopian population, mostly in and around Parkchester. The largest numbers come from Nigeria, but other nations such as Liberia, Ghana, Senegal, Sierra Leone and Ivory Coast, to name just a few, have contributed to this population.

From 2010 to 2020, the Black population increased from 416,695 residents at 30.1% to 419,393 residents at 28.5%, a gain of 2,698 residents or 0.6%. Their percentage portion dropped slightly due to other racial populations increasing.

== Native American population ==
Native Americans are a very small minority in the borough. Only some 5,560 individuals (out of the borough's 1.4 million people) are Native American, which is equal to just 0.4% of the population. In addition, roughly 2,500 people are Native Americans of non-Hispanic origin.

However a significant amount of the Hispanic population are native but due to the confusion of the census it's not reflected.

== Asian population ==
Asians are a small but sizable minority in the borough. At the 2009 American Community Survey 3.8% of Bronx's population was Asian.

- Indian 1.0%
- Chinese 0.7%
- Filipino 0.5%
- Vietnamese 0.2%
- Japanese 0.1%
- Korean 0.1%

Although having fewer Asians than other borough of New York, there are some Asian groups more numerous in the Bronx than elsewhere in the city. In 2000 the Bronx had the most Cambodians, the only New York borough with over 1000 Cambodians, they numbered 1366 in the Bronx. Asian Indians were the Bronx's most numerous Asian group, numbering 19305. There were 7628 Chinese in the borough, and 5446 Filipinos. Koreans numbered 4076. The total for Vietnamese was 3289 while Bangladeshis were counted at 2442. The only other Asian group numbering over 1000 in the city was the 1727 Pakistanis.

From 2010 to 2020, the Asian population went from 47,335 residents at 3.4% to 67,766 residents at 4.6%, a gain of 20,431 residents or 43.2%.

Muslim Romani people from southern Yugoslavia settled in the Bronx.

== Multiracial population ==
People identifying multiracial heritage are also a sizable minority in The Bronx, numbering over 41,800 individuals and represent 3.0% of the population. People of mixed Caucasian and African American heritage number over 6,850 members and form 0.5% of the population. People of mixed Caucasian and Native American heritage number over 2,450 members and form 0.2% of the population. People of mixed Caucasian and Asian heritage number over 880 members and form 0.1% of the population. People of mixed African American and Native American heritage number over 1,220 members and form 0.1% of the population. From 2010 to 2020, the multiracial population went from 15,962 residents at 1.2% to 28,370 residents at 1.9%, a gain of 12,408 residents or 77.7%.

== Hispanic and Latino population ==
The Bronx is the only New York borough with a Hispanic majority. At the 2010 Census, 53.5% of the Bronx's population was of Hispanic, Latino, or Spanish origin (they may be of any race). At the 2009 American Community Survey, Puerto Ricans represented 23.2% of the borough's population, Mexicans made up 5.2%. In 2005, more than 200,000 Dominicans called the Bronx home, other Hispanics such as Salvadorans and Ecuadorians also call the Bronx home, and in 2000 Dominicans comprised 14.5% of the Bronx population. The Puerto Rican population was at its height around 1980, when they represented about 30% of the Bronx. It declined in the 1990s and early 2000s, and it is relatively stagnant now. The Dominican population has been growing heavily since the 1990s. As of 2017, Dominicans made up 22.4% of the Bronx population, while Puerto Ricans made up 19.6%, giving the Bronx some of the highest concentrations of both in the country. Together these 2 groups make up over 75% of the borough's Hispanics.

From 2010 to 2020, the Hispanic population went from 741,413 residents at 53.5% to 806,463 residents at 54.8%, a gain of 65,050 residents or 8.8%.

== Languages ==
As of 2010, 46.29% (584,463) of Bronx residents age 5 and older spoke Spanish at home as a primary language, while 44.02% (555,767) spoke English, 2.48% (31,361) African languages, 0.91% (11,455) French, 0.90% (11,355) Italian, 0.87% (10,946) various Indic languages, 0.70% (8,836) other Indo-European languages, and Chinese was spoken as a main language by 0.50% (6,610) of the population over the age of five. In total, 55.98% (706,783) of the Bronx's population age 5 and older spoke a mother language other than English.

== Immigration ==
At the 2009 American Community Survey, 31.9% of Bronx's population was foreign born and another 8.5% was born in Puerto Rico, U.S. Island areas, or born abroad to American parent(s). During the 1960s, the Bronx transitioned from majority Irish, Italian and Jewish to majority Puerto Rican and African American. However, since around 2000, increases in cost of living in New York and heavy immigration from Latin America and Africa, a new transition has been taking place, with Dominicans now outnumbering Puerto Ricans and African immigrants growing in size to the African American population.

Bronx residents born abroad or overseas, 1930 and 2000
1930 United States census			2000 United States census		
Total population of the Bronx	1,265,258		Total population of the Bronx	1,332,650	
			All born abroad or overseas ^{‡}	524,410	39.4%
			Puerto Rico	126,649	9.5%
Foreign-born Whites	477,342	37.7%	All foreign-born	385,827	29.0%
White persons born in Russia	135,210	10.7%	Dominican Republic	124,032	9.3%
White persons born in Italy	67,732	5.4%	Jamaica	51,120	3.8%
White persons born in Poland	55,969	4.4%	Mexico	20,962	1.6%
White persons born in Germany	43,349	3.4%	Guyana	14,868	1.1%
White persons born in the Irish Free State ^{†}	34,538	2.7%	Ecuador	14,800	1.1%
Other foreign birthplaces of Whites	140,544	11.1%	Other foreign birthplaces	160,045	12.0%
† the 26 counties now within the Republic of Ireland			‡ beyond the 50 states & District of Columbia		
