= Bronk =

Bronk or Bronck may refer to:

- Jonas Bronck (1600–1643), Swedish immigrant who gave his name to The Bronx
  - Pieter Bronck, son or brother of Jonas Bronck
  - Bronck House, historic landmark home of Pieter Bronck
- Deborah Bronk, American oceanographer
- Detlev Wulf Bronk (1897–1975), president of Johns Hopkins University
  - J. Ramsey Bronk (1929–2007), his son, a biologist based in England
  - Christopher Bronk Ramsey, his grandson, a British physicist
- Isabelle Bronk (1858–1943), American professor of French
- Benjy Bronk, American producer and comedian
- Bronk (crater), a crater on the far side of the Moon
- Calgary Bronks, Canadian Football team now known as the Calgary Stampeders
- Bronk (TV series), a 1975 TV series
- William Bronk, American poet and National Book Award winner for Life Supports

== See also ==
- Pronk (disambiguation)
