= Bobone =

Bobone is a given name and surname which may refer to:

- Saint Bobo (died 986), Frankish warrior and pilgrim from Noyers, also known as Bobone in Italian
- Bobo of San Teodoro (died 1199), Italian Roman Catholic cardinal, known as Bobone in Italian, a relative of Pope Celestine III
- Bruno Bobone (born 1960), Portuguese businessman
- Giacinto Bobone, birth name of Italian cardinal and later Pope Celestine III (1191–1198)
- Jorge Bobone (1901–1958), Argentine astronomer
  - Bobone (crater), lunar crater named after Jorge Bobone
- Romano Bobone, Italian Roman Catholic cardinal appointed in 928 by Pope Leo VI
- Romano Bobone (12th century), Italian cardinal
