= Nordic Americans in New York City =

Scandinavians in New York

Nordic and Scandinavian Americans have constituted a long-running ethnic presence in New York City since its very founding.

Throughout much of their history in New York City, the different Nordic groups lived in close proximity to one another and shared cultural, religious, and social institutions. Early Scandinavian community life was characterized by Pan-Scandinavian organizations and newspapers. As immigration increased during the 19th century, larger Norwegian, Swedish and Danish communities developed their own ethnic-specific institutions and newspapers. With the decline and assimilation of these communities during the 20th and 21st centuries, some Nordic institutions increasingly returned to a broader Pan-Scandinavian character.

== History ==
=== Danes ===
Our Saviour's Danish Evangelical Lutheran Church of Brooklyn, New-York, and vicinity (Vor Frelsers kirke) in Brooklyn, New York (1912)

The first Danes in New York were sailors in the crew of Henry Hudson’s ship the Halve Maen, which sailed into New York Harbor in 1609. In 1675 lived at least 100 Danes in New York. In 1704 the Danes together with the Norwegians build a small Lutheran chapel near the intersection of Broadway and Rector Street.

Although most Danish immigrants headed west, by 1870 Chicago had overtaken New York as the leading urban destination for Danish immigrants. The 1880s and 1890s marked the peak of rural Danish migration, during which New York State dropped to ninth in the number of Danish-born residents, accounting for roughly 5% of the Danish-born population in the United States. However, by the turn of the century, Danish immigrants to New York increasingly entered occupations unrelated to the maritime industry. The migration period from 1890 to 1920 was characterized by greater industrialization and urbanization than the previous era, which meant that more Danish immigrants settled in urban areas, including New York City.

Most Danish immigrants were Lutheran but many married outside their religious and ethnic group. The health insurance organization for Scandinavian immigrants, Dania, opened a branch in Brooklyn in 1886.

From 1891 to 1953 a Danish language newspaper,Nordlyset (English: The Northern Light) was published. The best known Dane from New York is Jacob A. Riis, a photographer and writer, who wrote the book How the Other Half Lives which exposed the poor living conditions in the slums of New York. He was called “New York’s most useful citizen” by President Theodore Roosevelt and his work led to new reforms and regulations.

In 1932, around 12,000 Danish Americans lived in the Bay Ridge neighborhood, which also contained concentrations of other Nordic Americans. From its peak in the mid-20th century, the Danish community, much like the other Nordic communities in New York, declined during the latter half of the 20th century and into the 21st century. As the community dwindled, the Danish-language newspaper Nordlyset ceased publication in 1953. The Danish Athletic Club in Sunset Park continued until 2020.

=== Finns ===
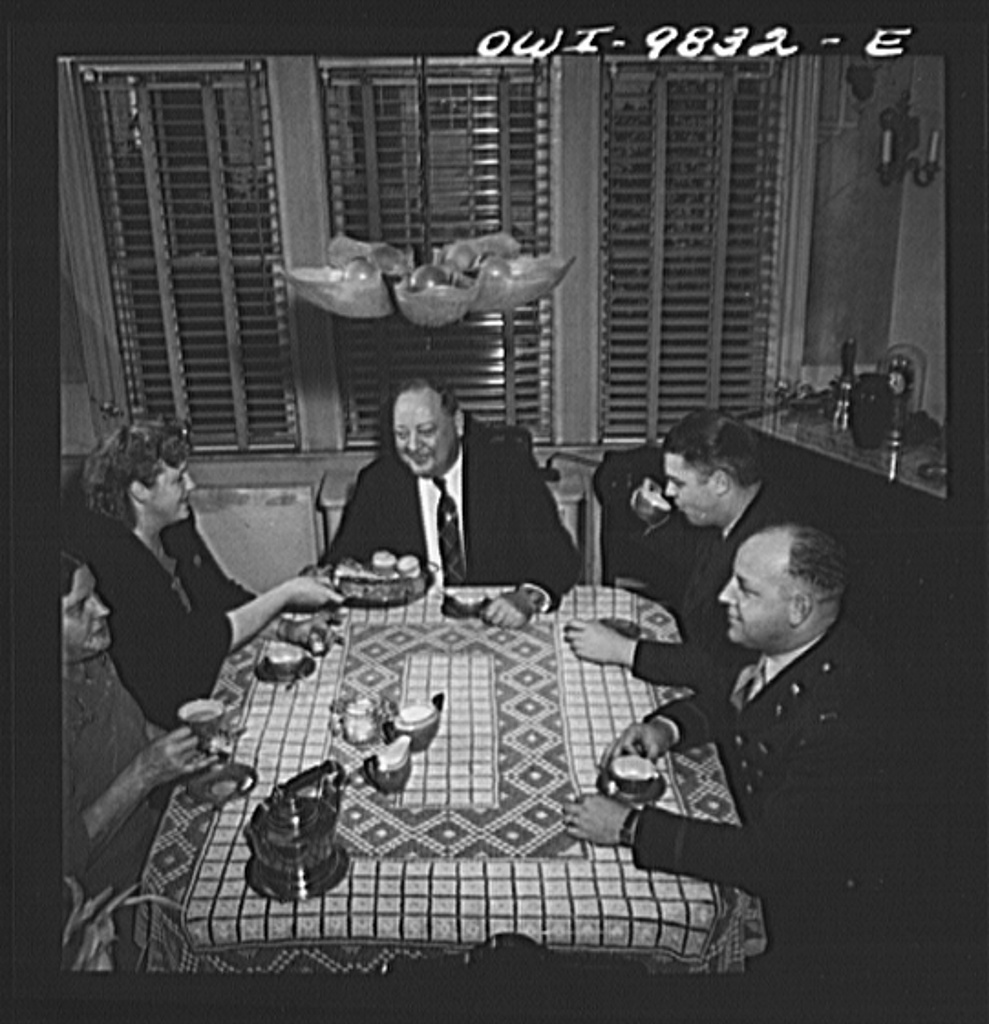
A Finnish-American family in Finntown, Brooklyn (1942).

Before the nineteenth century, most of the Finns in New York were sailors. Because of that the Finnish Seamen’s Mission was founded in 1887 by Emil Panelius, which was the first Finnish religious organization in the city. In the 1900 census the city had about 10,000 people of Finnish descent. A Finnish language newspaper, New Yorkin Uutiset (New York News), was published from 1906 to 1996. In 1930 the number of people of Finnish descent reached a bit over 20,000. In 2010 there lived 3,000 Finns in the New York City metropolitan area.

==== Finntown ====
Portions of Sunset Park were known as Finntown. Although there are no official statistics, it is estimated that there were around 10,000 Finns in Brooklyn at its peak.

At its height, the neighborhood contained many Finnish-owned businesses, including restaurants, bakeries, markets, taverns, shops, and saunas. It also had Finnish social halls, churches, and organized labor groups, and the Finnish language was commonly spoken. Imatra Hall, built by the Finnish community in 1907, became an important social gathering place for Brooklyn's Finnish community.

Finntown in Sunset Park began to decline after World War II, particularly during the 1960s. Reasons for the decline included return migration to Finland, with around a quarter of Finnish immigrants returning to Finland. Other factors included migration to warmer places such as Florida and demographic changes in the neighborhood. Caribbean immigrants, mainly from Puerto Rico, arrived in the 1950s, followed by Korean, Vietnamese, and Chinese immigrants in the 1980s.

=== Norwegians ===
Norwegian Suffrage Demonstration for American Women, New York, 1913

The first Norwegians immigrated to New Amsterdam during the seventeenth century. One of the immigrants was Anneken Henriksen who married Jan Arentzen van der Bilt, a forebear of the Vanderbilt family. The booming maritime industry attracted Norwegians to the city to work with the industry.

In 1832, 313 Norwegian and Swedish immigrants arrived in the United States, marking the beginning of increased Norwegian immigration. Norwegian immigration was at its highest between 1865 and 1911, before immigration restrictions were introduced by the United States government. Although most Norwegian immigrants arrived through New York, relatively few remained in the city. In 1850, nearly half of Norwegian immigrants in the United States lived in Wisconsin.

During the 1870s, Norwegians began moving from Manhattan to what is now Carroll Gardens in Brooklyn to be closer to the shipyards in the Erie Basin. The area developed into a Norwegian community with churches and businesses.

By the late 1930s, Bay Ridge had become a major center of Scandinavian settlement in New York City and most of the Norwegian-American population shifted to there. In 1939, an estimated half of the city's combined population of Swedes, Norwegians, and Danes lived in Bay Ridge.

In 1940 there were about 55,000 first and second generation Norwegians in New York. In 1990 the Norwegian population in the city had fallen to about 10,000 and in 2007 more than 20,000 claimed to be of Norwegian descent. One of the best known Norwegian from New York is Thor Solberg, an aviation pioneer, who was the first person to fly solo from the United States to Norway in 1935.

=== Swedes ===
Swedish Americans participating in a Fourth of July parade in New York City in 1911

Among the Swedish settlers in New York was Jonas Bronck, who in 1629 bought a large tract of land north of Manhattan. The Bronk surname might be the etymological origin behind the Bronx. Another early Swede in New York was Mons Pieterson, a Swedish speaking Finn, who together with other Swedish immigrants helped clear out Harlem, which was cleared by 1661.

By 1835 there were about 100 Swedes in New York. The first Swedish language newspaper, Skandinaven, was published from 1851 to 1853. In the mid-nineteenth century many Swedes emigrated to the United States because of land shortages and compulsory military service. Many immigrants only passed through the city to get to elsewhere in the United States. By 1870 the Swedish population was around 3,000.

Swedish immigration to the United States increased during the late 19th century, with a large wave of immigration occurring during the 1880s. Most of these immigrants came from rural areas of Sweden and settled in rural areas of the United States. Between 1890 and 1910, an increasing number of immigrants came from urban areas of Sweden and settled in the northeastern United States, including New York. Like Danish and Norwegian immigrants, Swedes in New York mainly settled in Brooklyn, which was home to about half of the city's Swedish population. Swedish men in Brooklyn commonly worked in ironwork and construction, particularly in foundations and flooring, while Swedish women commonly worked as housekeepers, maids, cooks, and seamstresses.

One Swedish American who rose to prominence during this period was J. Edward Swanstrom, the son of Swedish immigrant and Congregationalist minister John P. Swanstrom. In 1901, he was elected the second borough president of Brooklyn under the fusion ticket backed by the Brooklyn Citizens Union.

In 1900 there were around 28,000 Swedes in New York with about 15.000 in Brooklyn and about 11,000 in Manhattan. In 1930 there were 37,200 Swedish immigrants and 24,500 non immigrants of Swedish descent in the city. As the economy improved in Sweden, fewer immigrants arrived and by 1980 there were about 3,000 Swedish immigrants in New York. In 1996 the Swedish consulate in New York began sponsoring the Swedish Midsummer Celebration in Battery Park.

== Demographics ==
According to the 2024 American Community Survey, around 56,000 of New York City residents reported Danish, Finnish, Icelandic, Norwegian, or Swedish ancestry. Manhattan contains the largest number and highest proportion among the five boroughs. Brooklyn contains the second largest number, while Staten Island has the second highest proportion.

Nordic Americans in New York City by ancestry in 2024
Borough	Danish	Finnish	Icelandic	Norwegian	Swedish	Total Nordic ancestries (Note: Total Nordic ancestries are the sum of Danish, Finnish, Icelandic, Norwegian, and Swedish ancestry estimates. Individuals may report more than one Nordic ancestry may therefore be counted more than once in the total count.)	% of population
Queens	1,148	659	38	2,242	2,965	7,052	0.30%
Brooklyn	2,725	1,594	387	6,945	8,242	19,893	0.76%
Manhattan	3,005	1,902	481	7,739	8,886	22,013	1.35%
Staten Island	402	222	0	3,213	1,678	5,515	1.11%
The Bronx	320	145	0	343	598	1,406	0.10%
New York City	7,600	4,522	906	20,482	22,369	55,879	0.67%

=== Historical ===
The Nordic population of New York City was substantially larger during the early twentieth century. The population is based on census measures of birthplace, parentage, mother tongue, and later self reported ancestry. The Nordic population increased from 1,368 in 1850 to a peak of 177,364 in 1930. It subsequently declined, reaching post peak low of 51,033 in 2010. It rebounded to 60,872 in 2021.

== Notable people ==
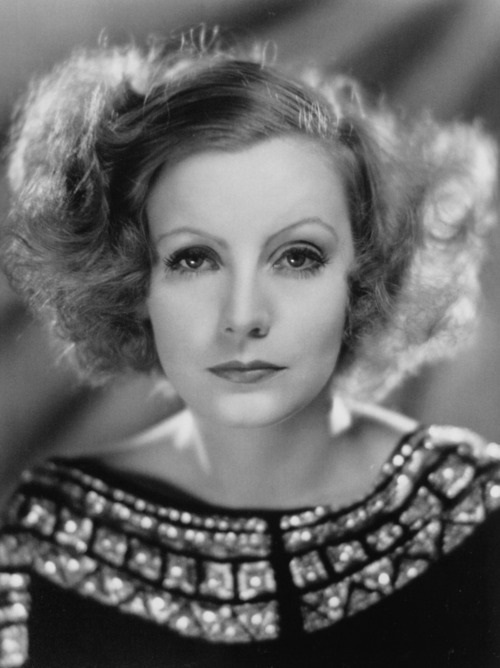
Greta Garbo, Swedish-born actress and longtime Manhattan resident

=== Academia and humanities ===
- Anu Bradford - Finnish-born author, law professor, and expert in international trade law

=== Business ===
- G. Unger Vetlesen - Norwegian-American shipbuilder and philanthropist

=== Law, politics, and diplomacy ===
- Charles Ulrick Bay - Norwegian-American businessman and United States Ambassador to Norway
- J. Edward Swanstrom - lawyer, politician and Borough president of Brooklyn

=== Media ===
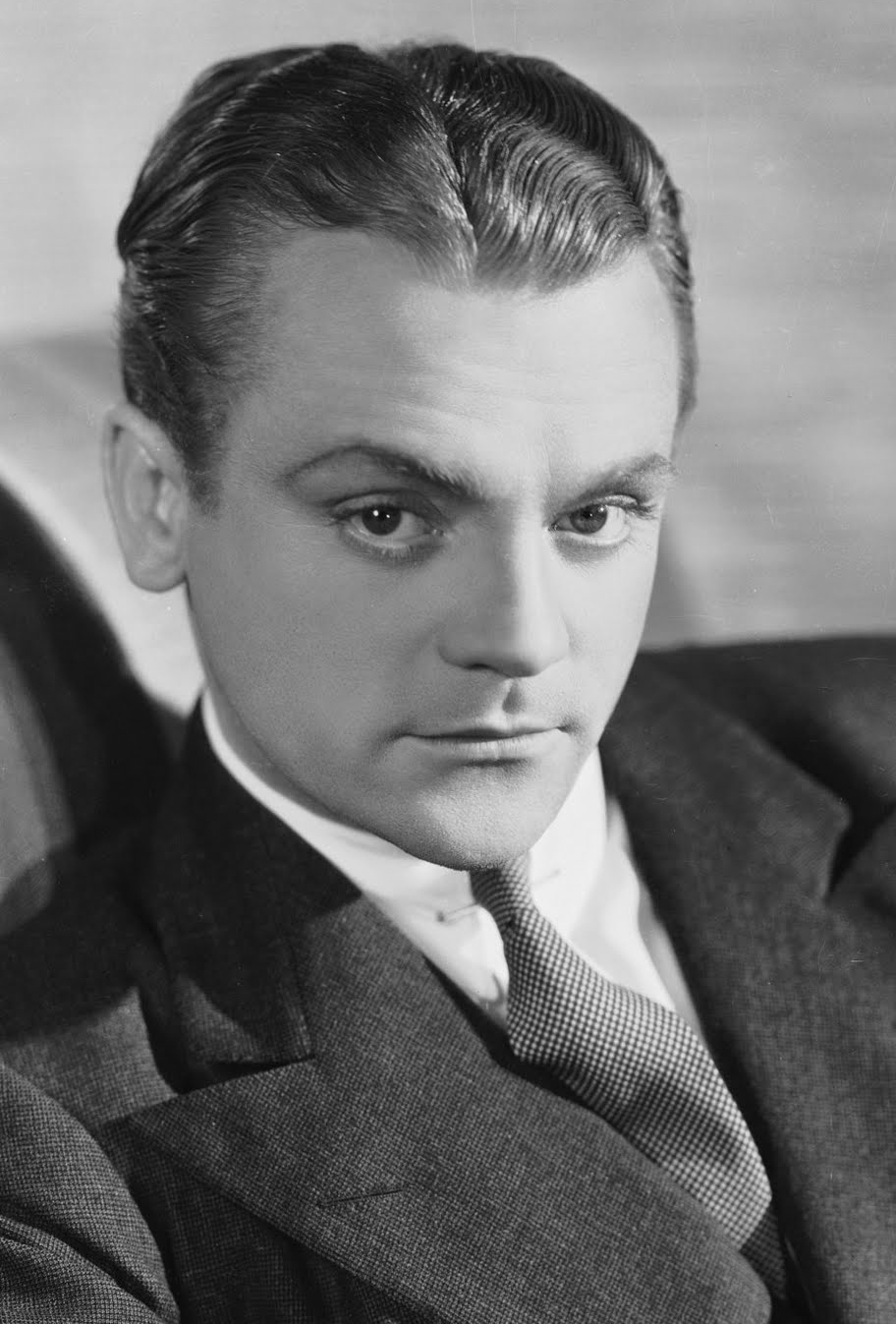
James Cagney, Norwegian-American actor born in Manhattan

- Jacob Riis - Danish-born social reformer, "muck-raking" journalist, and social documentary photographer
- Louise Dahl-Wolfe - Swedish-American and Norwegian-American photographer
- Peter Sekaer - Danish-born photographer and artist
- George Forss - Finnish-American photographer

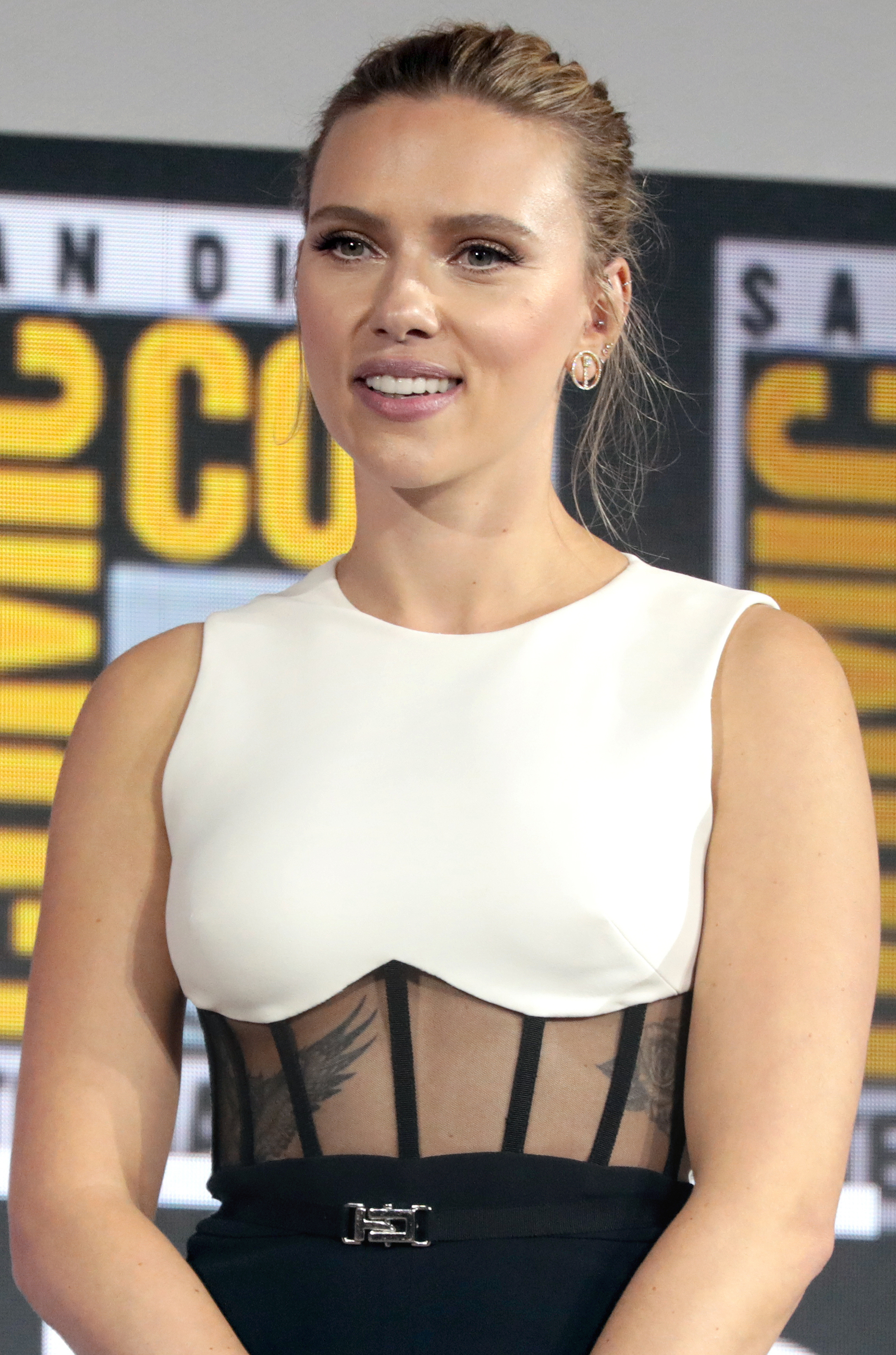
Scarlett Johansson, Danish-American actress born in Manhattan

=== Theater, arts, and culture ===
- James Cagney - Norwegian-American actor and dancer
- Celeste Holm - Norwegian-American actress
- David Johansen - Norwegian-American singer, songwriter, and actor
- Macaulay Culkin - Norwegian-American actor and musician
- Kieran Culkin - Norwegian-American actor
- Rory Culkin - Norwegian-American actor
- Erik Bye - Norwegian-American journalist, artist, author, film actor, folk singer and radio and television personality
- Nina Arvesen - Norwegian-American actress, model, dancer, and businesswoman
- Claes Oldenburg - Swedish-born sculptor best known for his public art installations, typically featuring large replicas of everyday objects
- Greta Garbo - Swedish-American film actress
- Dines Carlsen - Danish-American Expressionist painter
- Arthur Anderson (actor) - Danish-American actor of radio, film, television, and stage
- Antonio Jacobsen - Danish-born maritime artist known as the "Audubon of Steam Vessels"
- Johann Berthelsen - Danish-born American Impressionist painter
- Scarlett Johansson - Danish-American actress, singer, producer, and director
- Viggo Mortensen - Danish-American actor and filmmaker
- Otto Harbach - Danish-American lyricist and librettist
- Sylvester Ahola - Finnish-American classic jazz trumpeter and cornetist
- Christine Lahti - Finnish-American actress and filmmaker
- Jessica Lange - Finnish-American actress and photographer
- Steina Vasulka - Icelandic-born early pioneer of video art
- Isabella Boylston - Icelandic-American and Swedish-American ballet dancer

=== Exploration, military, and aviation ===
- Thor Solberg - Norwegian-born aviation pioneer who made the first successful flight from the United States of America to Norway
- William Aalto - Finnish-American soldier and member of the communist Abraham Lincoln Battalion
- Hans Hansen Bergen - Norwegian-born settler who was one of the earliest settlers of the Dutch colony of New Amsterdam
