= The Laiho Trio =

Finnish accordion musical group

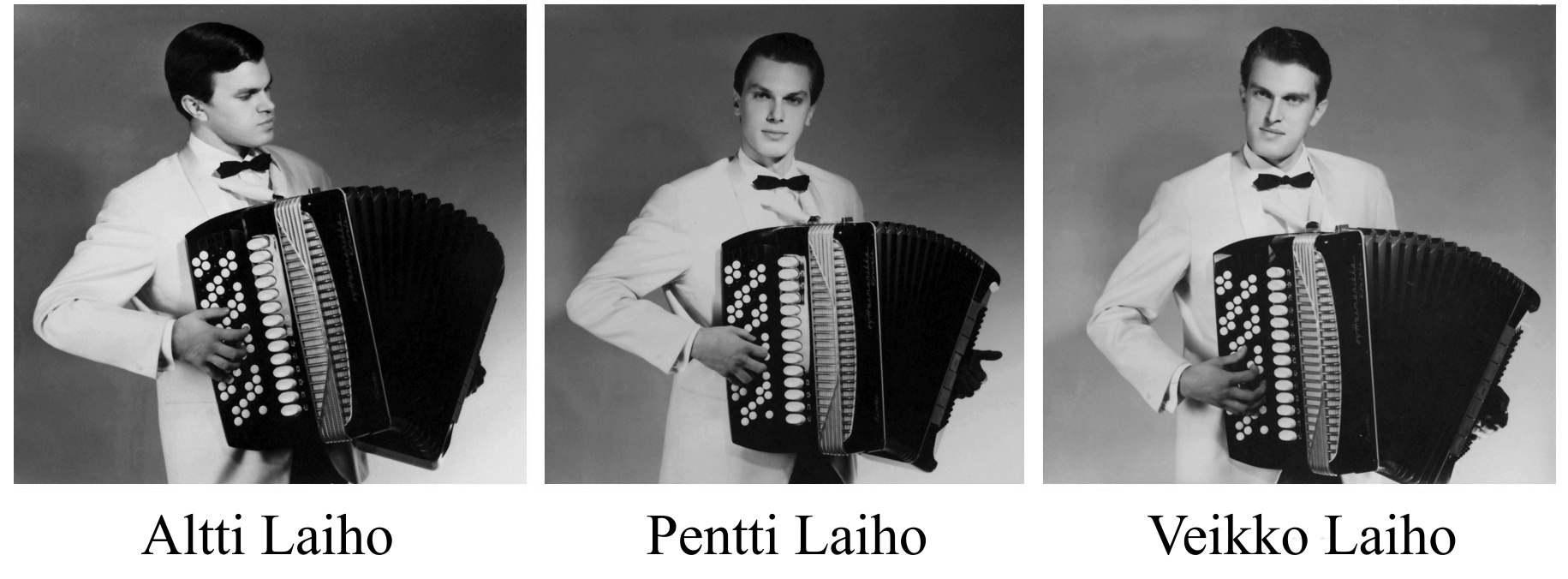
Trio Laiho, May 1967

The Laiho Trio was formed by three brothers, Altti Uolevi Laiho (8 April 1939 Pori – 20 January 2017 Ulvila), Veikko Olavi Laiho (31 December 1942 Pori) and Pentti Kalevi Laiho (21 July 1944 Pori). According to many experts, the trio was extremely unusual in its composition, repertoire, and virtuosity. The repertoire of the trio consisted of big symphony orchestral compositions arranged for three accordions. The brothers grew up in the city of Pori, in southwestern Finland, but they made their main career in the United States where they lived for years.

== Early life ==
They were mainly self-educated artists having their own technique and style. Progressing in playing skills they got interested in performing more demanding orchestral music and founded the accordion trio in 1960.

There was no repertoire available for them because nobody had composed or arranged material for three accordions. So arrangements had to be tailored especially for the trio. The very first arrangements for the trio were made by Yrjö Honkanen, Matti Viljanen and George de Godzinsky. The main classical repertoire was transcribed from orchestral scores by Tony Chiapparin, a French professor and composer. Later on, the brothers also arranged material by themselves. The repertoire consisted mainly of large orchestral compositions such as Beethoven's Symphony Nr 5, Coriolanus and Egmont overtures, Mozart's Symphony Nr 40, Sibelius' Finlandia and Karelia suite, Tchaikovsky's music from the Swan Lake, Sarasate's Gipsy Air, Saint-Saëns' Introduction and Rondo Capriccioso, Paganini's Moto Perpetuo and Le Sreghe, von Suppé's the Light Cavalry overture, Johann Strauss’ the Bat overture etc.

Besides performing activities, radio shows played an important role in their career. During the years 1960–1974 the brothers recorded dozens of radio shows for the Finnish Broadcasting Company YLE.

== The Laiho Trio in the United States ==
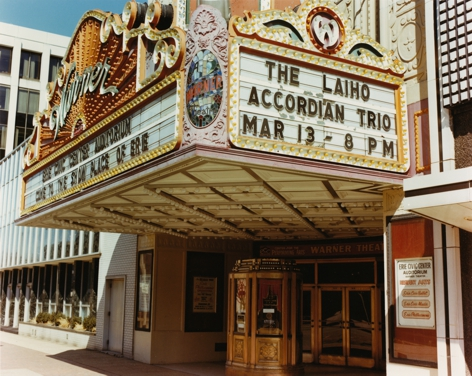
A concert of The Laiho Accordion Trio in the splendid Warner Theater

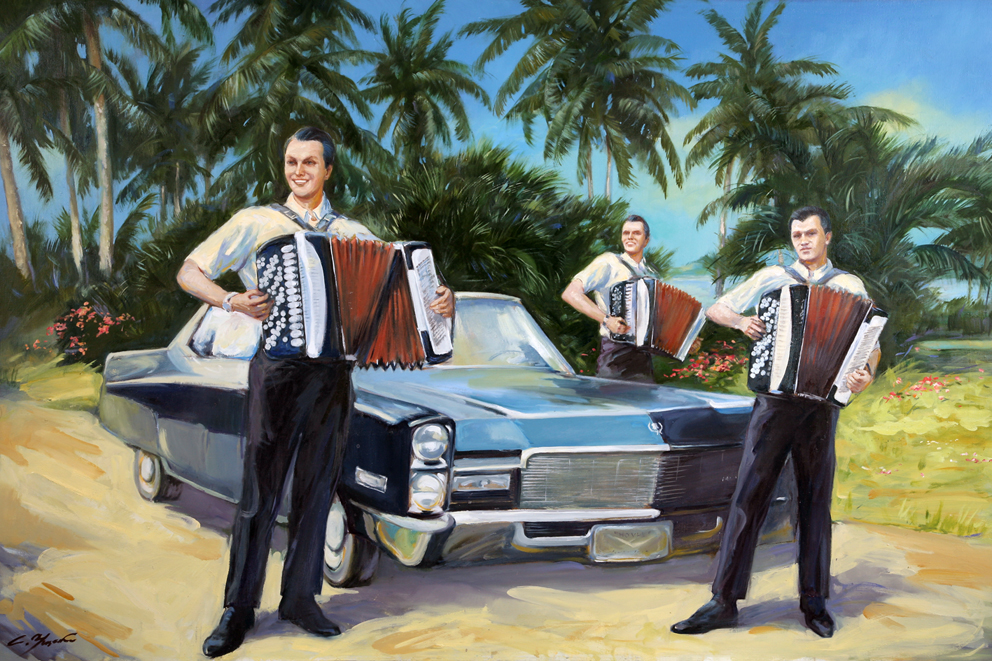
A painting by Sergei Ushtenko from the Laiho Trio on concert tour in America

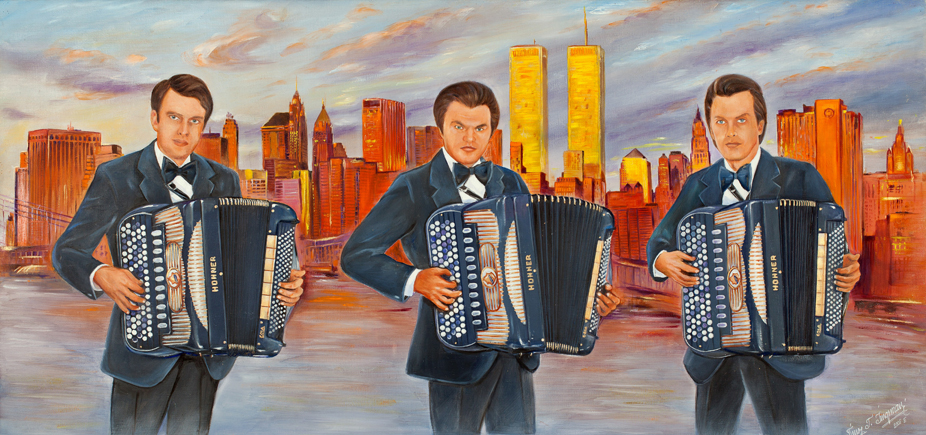
A painting by Timo Ingman from the Laiho Trio in New York

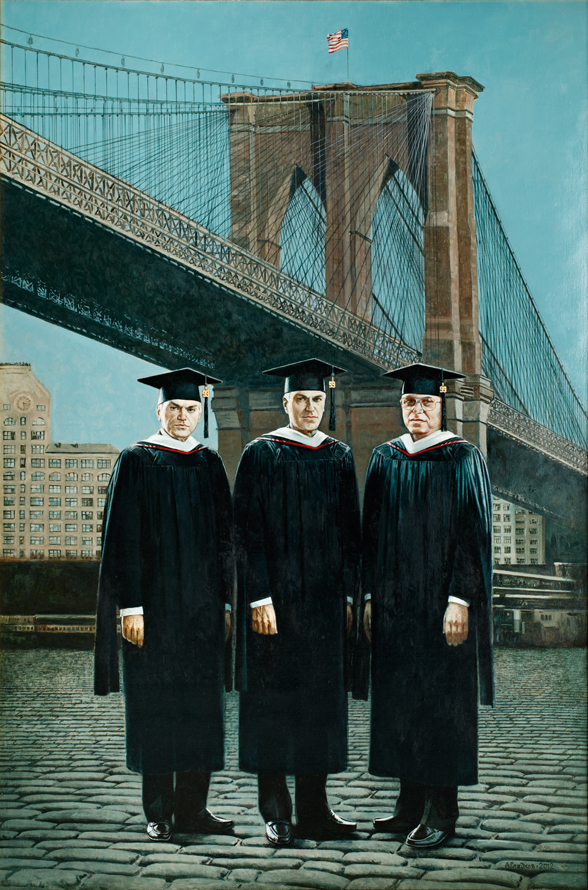
A painting by Aleksei Gladkov from the Laiho Trio when they graduated for the master's degrees in New York

An opportunity to perform outside Finland opened in 1967 and The Laiho Trio made their first North American tour in the years 1968 and 1969. The wide tour stretched all over the continent, the United States and Canada. The route went from the west coast to the east coast through almost all major cities. On January 28, 1969, the Canadian newspaper Vapaa Sana (Free Press) published an article concerning the Laiho Trio's concert at International Institute in Los Angeles. Following is a quote from the article: “An enthusiastic audience received these three handsome artists with great eagerness and expectation. We had already read advertisements in advance about it that they were called the Kings of the accordion, a term that nobody should step over. We waited something special. We did not disappointed with our expectation.” The newspaper continues: “A program in Finnish manners would not be perfect without Sibelius´ Finlandia. That was the last number in the program. It is unbelievable that on three accordions it can be played so demanding work as Finlandia. But the Laiho brothers performed it completely with firm holds that the hair rose up. It sounded like a performance of a symphony orchestra. Unbelievable but true.” The most important performances were in New York City, where they, for example, performed six times in Arthur Godfrey's CBS radio show. The shows were broadcast to millions of listeners throughout the whole continent of North America, which greatly advanced their future successful career in the United States. Godfrey was very impressed for the performances of the Laiho Trio and cried out “Wizards!” He told to his listeners again and again that “you cannot believe but there are three of them although it sounds like a playing of one instrument, so well they play together.” The second tour began in spring 1977 and now the brothers decided to stay permanently in the U.S.A. At first, they gave concerts in universities at Midwest and, at the end of the tour, they settled down in New York City, which was to be their home for decades. From New York City they made concert tours everywhere in the US without having any kind of competition from other accordionists. The Trio belonged to the artist roster of Mark Bichurin Concerts Corporation at Carnegie Hall in New York City, which arranged their concerts. This Bichurin's artist roster included many world-famous artists. The Laiho Trio was also introduced in the performing arts calendar called Musical America where accordionists had never before featured.

The brothers’ pioneering concerts by three accordions were unique and historical. They were full-length classical concerts on the biggest stages in the world with thousands of audience. The concerts were held at concert halls, theaters, cultural centers and universities. The Trio also gave concerts at churches, for example at Saint Patrick's Cathedral in New York City, which is one of the biggest churches in the world. Charles Rissanen, a newspaper editor, wrote about this concert in Aamulehti on August 9, 1981. Following is a quote from the article: “Pori Accordionists As ´Aces´ In The USA (headline) …The Laiho's have played in big churches - for example in New York´s most well-known Saint Patrick´s Cathedral …they play classic music with their accordions and make it sound almost like a playing of a symphony orchestra. …I heard the Laiho Trio playing there in front of the altar. Magnificent it felt. The accordion symphonists filled that big church with their music.“ The International Musician published an article about the Laiho Trio in the issue of October 1990. Following is a quote from the article: “The Laiho Trio - The First Three Accordion Symphonists (headline) … Never before it was considered that this instruments could contribute to the music programs of symphonies, operas or concertos. But in 1961 (1960), that all changed. Three brothers born in Pori, Finland, Altti, Veikko and Pentti Laiho formed the only ensemble in the world which performed symphonic orchestral music on three accordions. …They performed for audiences of thousands, the same as the concert world´s superstars.”

The Laiho Trio also performed in the TV and radio shows of the broadcasting companies of ABC, CBS, NBC, PBS, WOR, and WNYC. These shows were aired continent wide. The trio performed also several one-hour live concerts at WQXR, a radio station owned by The New York Times. This station is considered to be the best radio station in America for classical music. The concerts were led by Robert Sherman who made comments about the concerts to the radio listeners and for the performances of the Laiho Trio he said: “Great, brilliant, most unusual treat!” In November 1982, the Laiho Trio was honored to perform for Carl Gustav XVI and Silvia, the King and Queen of Sweden, during their visit to New York City.

After the death of their manager, the brothers started to handle their concert arrangements by themselves. A wide concert tour to Europe and China was under way. But then Pentti's hearing was weakened. He underwent a surgery but, unfortunately, with poor results, his hearing did not improve to normal. The brothers’ amazing career as a performing trio was over.

At that point, the brothers decided to utilize their experiences as performing artists for composition and started to study music theory and composing in The City University of New York. They each graduated as Bachelor of Science (B.S.) Veikko in 1990, Altti and Pentti in 1995 and Master of Music (M.M.) in the year 2000. In addition to this Veikko also graduated as Master of Arts in Teaching Music (M.A.T.) in 1992. The brothers got several awards due to their successful studies. In October 1993 they were nominated as members of The Golden Key International Honor Society, which invites the best students from American universities to be their members. In The City University of New York they had several famous composers as their teachers. One was the most famous American composer John Corigliano.

Although the brothers’ career as accordion artists in the U.S. ended, they moved along into composing and their work with music continues as actively as ever before.

== Directors of Imatra Society in Brooklyn ==
During the studying period, the brothers participated in the activities of the organization of the Finnish immigrants named Imatra Society in Brooklyn, New York. Veikko was the president of the society and Pentti served as the treasurer. During their management the society celebrated its 100th anniversary. On Pentti's initiative the 40th Street, where the society is located, was renamed ”Finlandia Street”. The brothers were seeking to maintain and improve the Imatra Society's activities to advance Finnish culture in the U.S. To secure the future existence of the society they made an effort to get it under the ownership of the Finnish government. One of their specific goals was to start arranging an annual music festival at Imatra Society where Finnish musicians could show their skills to American audience and also American musicians could participate the festival. But they didn’t get enough support for these ideas from the other members as many of them wanted to have closer co-operation with non-Finnish people. Consequently, the brothers resigned the board in 1992. The society was out of debt at that moment, but soon after, the Imatra Society ran into debt and went bankrupt in 1996. Following there are some quotes from the newspaper New Yorkin Uutiset in which the activities of the society are reported during the leadership of the Laiho brothers. December 13, 1988: “Soon 100 years old Imatra Society in Brooklyn is living a new rising age. …Last Sunday afternoon the Imatra hall near the Sunset Park in Brooklyn experienced an all-time surprise, the Society´s own Christmas party was attended with more people than for many, many, years.” February 14, 1989: “…Veikko Laiho with his effectual board has received more and more visiting orchestras and other groups. In the same way more people has attended the parties at Imatra hall during the year.” February 28. 1989: “The annual meeting elected Veikko Laiho unanimously with loud applause for the second year to be the president of the society.” October 16. 1990: “The present board has made good work at the ´helm´ of the Imatra Society and led the ship with the best possible way.” June 20. 1992, a letter from the members of Imatra: “The Imatra Society is to thank the Laiho brothers for it that the Society exists on the whole…”

== Discography ==
- Amoureuse, R. Berger, Griserie, A. Bose, La Cumparsita, H. M. Rodriques and A media Luz, E. Donato. Finlandia Records (a division of the Warner Classics), RPE 459 (1967).
- Coriolanus Overture, Ludwig van Beethoven, In a Persian Market, Albert Ketelbey, Leichte Kavallerie overture, Franz von Suppé etc.. Europa (record label) LP record, AVP 224 GX 365 (1973) .
- The Last Spring, Edvard Grieg and Intermezzo from Cavalleria rusticana, Pietro Mascagni etc.. Musical Heritage Society LP record, MHS 3908Z (1978).
- 12 songs composed by Veikko Olavi Laiho, arranges by Pentti Lasanen, lyrics and sung on the record by Helka Hynninen. Peel-Records, PLHCD-001 Teosto.
- 20 songs composed by Veikko Olavi Laiho, arranged by Pentti Lasanen, lyrics and sung on the record by Helka Hynninen. Tatsia-Musiikki Oy. Tatsia CD-079 1997.

== Compositions ==
Work	Composer
Caprice, Piano	Altti U. Laiho
Der Messias, Large Orchestra	Altti U. Laiho
Der Messias, Small Orchestra	Altti U. Laiho
Der Messias Hymne, Piano	Altti U. Laiho
Divertimento, Orchestra	Altti U. Laiho
Divertimentos No. 1-14, Orchestra	Pentti K. Laiho
Downtown Manhattan, Orchestra	Pentti K. Laiho
Echoes of Spring, Orchestra	Altti U. Laiho
Etude, Piano and Orchestra	Altti U. Laiho
Etudes No. 1-2, Small Ensembles	Pentti K. Laiho
Fairytale Wedding Waltz, Orchestra	Veikko Olavi Laiho
Glasnost Time, Orchestra	Veikko Olavi Laiho
Grande Valse Romantique, Piano	Altti U. Laiho
Greeting Prelude, String Quartet	Pentti K. Laiho
Helle Sommernacht, Orchestra	Altti U. Laiho
Himmels Singen, Chorus and Orchestra	Altti U. Laiho
Himmels Singen, Chorus and Piano	Altti U. Laiho
Humoresque, Piano	Altti U. Laiho
Im Fruhling, Voice and Piano	Altti U. Laiho
In the Fascination of New York, Orchestra	Veikko Olavi Laiho
Mazurkas No. 1-3, Orchestra	Pentti K. Laiho
Moonlight at Christmas Night, Orchestra	Altti U. Laiho
Moto Perpetuo, Orchestra	Veikko Olavi Laiho
New York City at Night, Orchestra	Pentti K. Laiho
Scherzo, Orchestra	Veikko Olavi Laiho
Serenade, Voice and Piano	Pentti K. Laiho
String Quartet	Altti U. Laiho
String Quartet	Pentti K. Laiho
String Quartet	Veikko Olavi Laiho
Suite, Orchestra	Altti U. Laiho
Suite, Orchestra	Pentti K. Laiho
Suite, Orchestra	Veikko Olavi Laiho
Symphonie im Natur, Orchestra	Altti U. Laiho
Symphony No. 2, Orchestra	Altti U. Laiho
Symphonies No. 1-3, Orchestra	Pentti K. Laiho
Symphonies No. 1-2, Orchestra	Veikko Olavi Laiho
The Sons of Pori, Orchestra	Veikko Olavi Laiho
Ukko Nooa, Orchestra	Veikko Olavi Laiho
Waltz of the Happy, Orchestra	Veikko Olavi Laiho
Waltzes No. 1-2, Orchestra	Altti U. Laiho
Waltzes No. 1-10, Orchestra	Pentti K. Laiho

== Songs composed by Veikko Olavi Laiho ==
Work	Composer	Lyrics
Askeleet kuun sillalla	Veikko Olavi Laiho	Helka Hynninen
Etsin nuoruuteni kesää	Veikko Olavi Laiho	Helka Hynninen
Florida´s tango	Veikko Olavi Laiho	Helka Hynninen
Haaveita sinessä	Veikko Olavi Laiho	Helka Hynninen
Hän poissa on	Veikko Olavi Laiho	Helka Hynninen
Hyvän haltijan lahjat	Veikko Olavi Laiho	Helka Hynninen
Juhannusruusut	Veikko Olavi Laiho	Helka Hynninen
Kaukainen kutsu	Veikko Olavi Laiho	Helka Hynninen
Keskiyön aurinko	Veikko Olavi Laiho	Helka Hynninen
Kirjaimet hiakassa	Veikko Olavi Laiho	Helka Hynninen
Kukkasein	Veikko Olavi Laiho	Helka Hynninen
Kutsun kuulen meren	Veikko Olavi Laiho	Helka Hynninen
Mairelle	Veikko Olavi Laiho	Helka Hynninen
Muistoja lapsuudenkodista	Veikko Olavi Laiho	Helka Hynninen
Muistojen tango	Veikko Olavi Laiho	Helka Hynninen
Mummon tuutilaulu	Veikko Olavi Laiho	Helka Hynninen
Onnellisia päiviä	Veikko Olavi Laiho	Helka Hynninen
Pielisen kauneutta	Veikko Olavi Laiho	Helka Hynninen
Rakkain ihminen	Veikko Olavi Laiho	Helka Hynninen
Sinulle	Veikko Olavi Laiho	Helka Hynninen
Sinulle ystäväin	Veikko Olavi Laiho	Helka Hynninen
Soi sävel yhteinen	Veikko Olavi Laiho	Helka Hynninen
Sylin täydeltä onnea	Veikko Olavi Laiho	Helka Hynninen
Syyslehtien tanssi	Veikko Olavi Laiho	Helka Hynninen
Sä missä viivyit	Veikko Olavi Laiho	Helka Hynninen
Särkynyt kristalli	Veikko Olavi Laiho	Helka Hynninen
Taivaan tähtimerkit	Veikko Olavi Laiho	Helka Hynninen
Tyhjä keinutuoli	Veikko Olavi Laiho	Helka Hynninen
Tyttären valssi	Veikko Olavi Laiho	Helka Hynninen
Täydenkuun aikaan	Veikko Olavi Laiho	Helka Hynninen
Uskon rakkauden voimaan	Veikko Olavi Laiho	Helka Hynninen
Yksin	Veikko Olavi Laiho	Helka Hynninen

== Works arranged for the Laiho Trio ==
Work	Composer	Arranger
A Media luz	E. Donato	Tony Chiapparin
Adios muchachos	Sanders	Tony Chiapparin
Amoureuse	R. Berger	Tony Chiapparin
Brusseler Spitzen	Albert Vossen	Yrjö Honkanen
Caminito	I. de Filiberto	Tony Chiapparin
Elämä juoksuhaudoissa		Yrjö Honkanen
Eron kyyneleet	Maurice Ribot	Matti Viljanen
Griserie	A. Bose	Tony Chiapparin
Iltatähti	Onni Laihanen	Yrjö Honkanen
Jalousie	Jacob Gade	Matti Viljanen
Kesäilta	Oskar Merikanto	Pentti K. Laiho
La Cumparsita	G. H. Matos-Rodriquez	Tony Chiapparin
Love is Blue	Andre Popp	Altti U. Laiho
Manchurian kukkuloilla	A. Schatrow	Matti Viljanen
Muistoja Karpaateilta		Matti Viljanen
Muistoja Pohjolasta	Sam Sihvo	Pentti K. Laiho
Rantakoivun alla	Onni Laihanen	Yrjö Honkanen
Serenata	Leroy Anderson	Tony Chiapparin
Sirkkojen tanssi	Viljo Vesterinen	Yrjö Honkanen
Songe d´automne	Archibald Joyce	Matti Viljanen
Valssi menneiltä ajoilta	Ivanovici	Yrjö Honkanen
An der schönen blauen Donau	Johann Strauss	Altti U. Laiho
Coriolan, overture	Ludwig van Beethoven	George de Godzinsky
Dance of the Comedians, from the Bartered Bide	Bedrich Smetana	Matti Viljanen
Danse des cygnes, from the ballet Swan Lake	Pjotr Tschaikowsky	Altti U. Laiho
Die Fledermaus, overture	Johann Strauss	Tony Chiapparin
Die leichte Kavallerie	Franz von Suppe	George de Godzinsky
Egmont, overture	Ludwig van Beethoven	Tony Chiapparin
Finlandia	Jean Sibelius	Matti Viljanen
Hora Staccato	Dinicu-Heifetz	Tony Chiapparin
In a Persian Market	Albert W. Ketelbey	Tony Chiapparin
Introduction and Rondo Cappriccioso	Camille Saint-Saens	Altti U.Laiho
Intermezzo, from Cavalleria Rusticane	Pietro Mascagni	Tony Chiapparin
Invitation to the Dance	Carl Maria von Weber	Tony Chiapparin
La Traviata, Prelude to Act 1	G. Verdi	John Molinari
Le Streghe, Witches´ Dance	Niccolo Paganini	Altti U. Laiho
Moto Perpetuo	Niccolo Paganini	Veikko Olavi Laiho
Polka in Moll	Helmut Ritter	Matti Viljanen
Sinfonie No. 5	Ludwig van Beethoven	Altti U. Laiho
Sinfonie No. 40	Wolfgang A. Mozart	Altti U. Laiho
Suite de Carelie	Jean Sibelius	Tony Chiapparin
Suite from Swan Lake	Pjotr Tschaikowsky	Tony Chiapparin
The Flight of the Bumble-Bee, from the opera Tsar Saltan	Nicolas Rimsky-Korsakov	Veikko Olavi Laiho
The Stars and Stripes Forever	John Philip Sousa	Veikko Olavi Laiho
Ungariche Tänz No. 1	Johannes Brahms	Altti U. Laiho
Valse triste	Jean Sibelius	Altti U. Laiho
Våren	Edward Grieg	George de Godzinsky
Zigeunerweisen	Pablo de Sarasate	Altti U. Laiho
