= Bronk (crater) =

Crater on the Moon

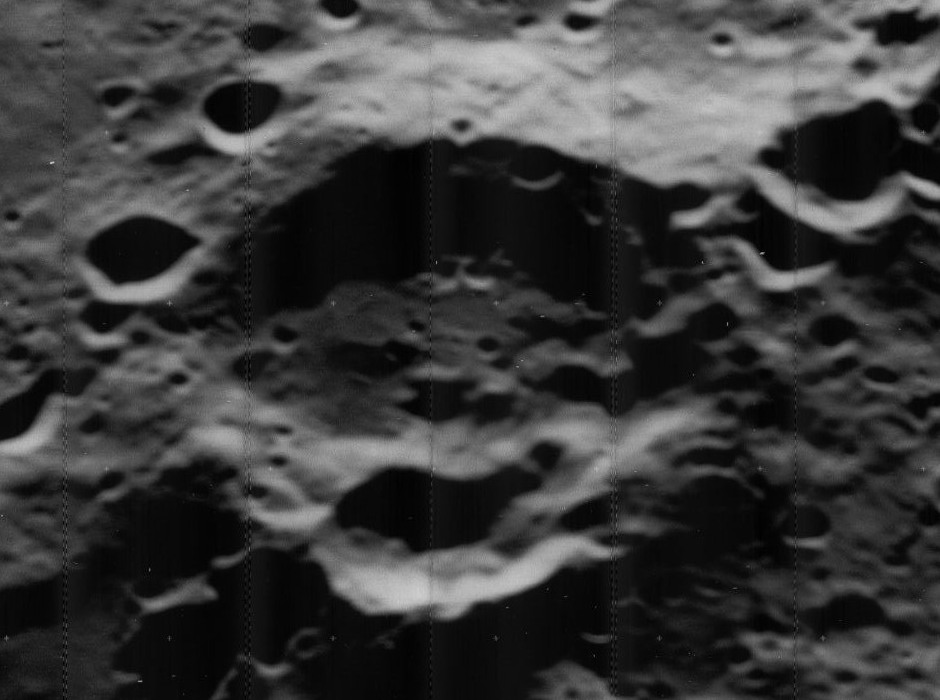
- Oblique Lunar Orbiter 5 image
- Coordinates: 26.1°N 134.5°W
- Diameter: 66.16 km (41.11 mi)
- Depth: Unknown
- Colongitude: 135° at sunrise
- Eponym: Detlev W. Bronk

Bronk is an eroded crater that lies on the far side of the Moon, out of sight from the Earth. It lies to the southeast of the larger crater Kovalevskaya. Less than one crater diameter to the east-northeast is the smaller crater Bobone.

This crater has been worn and eroded by subsequent impacts. A small crater overlays the eastern rim, and much of the northeastern and northern parts of the rim have been disorganized by lesser impacts. There is a depression in the southern rim and the southwest rim has an outward bulge or slump. The interior floor is also rough and somewhat irregular, with several tiny craterlets marking the surface.

This formation is named after American neurophysiologist Detlev W. Bronk (1897-1975). Its designation was formally adopted by the International Astronomical Union in 1979.
