= J. Ramsey Bronk =

American biochemist

- Born: John Everton Ramsey Bronk; 20 December 1929; Pennsylvania, United States
- Died: 31 December 2007 (aged 78); Oxford, England
- Education: Princeton University (BA); Oriel College, Oxford (DPhil)
- Employers: National Institutes of Health; Columbia University; University of York
- Spouse: Sylvia Bronk
- Children: 2; including Christopher
- Father: Detlev Bronk

John Everton Ramsey Bronk (20 December 1929 – 31 December 2007) was an American biologist based in England, specialising in the study of intestinal transport.

Bronk graduated from Princeton University in 1952, and then undertook a Rhodes Scholarship at Oriel College, Oxford University, conducting research under the supervision of Dr R B Fisher. He obtained his DPhil in biochemistry in June 1955.

Bronk then worked for the National Institutes of Health as a research scientist until 1958. In 1958 he joined the academic staff of the department of zoology at Columbia University, spending the 1964–1965 academic year as a Guggenheim Fellow at Oxford, under Dr D S Parsons. In 1966 Bronk became the first professor of biochemistry at the University of York, becoming emeritus in 1997.

== Personal life ==
Bronk was the son of Detlev Bronk and Helen Alexander Ramsey. Brought up in Pennsylvania, he was described as a "lover of all things English".

Bronk married an Englishwoman named Sylvia, with whom he had two sons Richard and Christopher. He died on 31 December 2007, in Oxford.
