= Romano Bobone =

Italian cardinal

Romano Bobone was an Italian cardinal. He was made cardinal deacon of S.R.C. in 928 by Pope Leo VI.

== See also ==
- Catholic Church in Italy
