= Jorge Bobone =

Argentine astronomer (1901–1958)

Jorge E. Bobone (1901 – October 21, 1958) was an Argentine astronomer.

He performed his work at the Observatorio Nacional Argentino in Córdoba, established in the 1870s by Benjamin Apthorp Gould and now belonging to the Universidad Nacional de Córdoba.

Between 1928 and 1954 he published multiple papers in the Astronomical Journal and the Astronomische Nachrichten. The majority of his papers were regarding photographic observations of comets, the ephemerides of Jupiter VI, and some asteroids.

The crater Bobone on the Moon and the asteroid 2507 Bobone were named after him.
