= Christopher Bronk Ramsey =

British physicist and mathematician

Christopher Bronk Ramsey is a British physicist, mathematician and specialist in radiocarbon dating. He is a professor at the University of Oxford and was the Director of the Research Laboratory for Archaeology and the History of Art (RLAHA) from 2014 until 2019. He is a member of Merton College, Oxford and a Bodley Fellow. His doctorate, completed in 1987, included the first successful implementation of carbon dioxide gas as a target for radiocarbon dating via accelerator mass spectrometry.

In the early 1990s, Bronk Ramsey became interested in the application of Bayesian statistics to the analysis of radiocarbon data. In 1994, he authored OxCal, an online radiocarbon calibration program. Bronk Ramsey has made significant contributions to various chronological issues, including the Minoan eruption of Thera, the British Neolithic, the dispersal of modern humans out of Africa and the Egyptian chronology. His recent work has focused on improving the radiocarbon calibration record and synthesizing radiocarbon data with other chronometric information. In October 2012, Bronk Ramsey published the first wholly terrestrial radiocarbon calibration record extending back to the limit of the technique. He is a member of the International Calibration (IntCal) group.

== Early life ==
Bronk Ramsey was born to English mother Sylvia and American biologist J. Ramsey Bronk and grew up in York with his brother Richard.

== Selected publications ==
- Bronk Ramsey, C.; Staff, RA; Bryant, CL; Brock, F; Kitagawa, H; der Plicht, J; Schlolaut, G; Marshall, MH; Brauer, A; et al. (2012). "A Complete Terrestrial Radiocarbon Record for 11.2 to 52.8 kyr B.P". Science. 338 (6105): 370–374. Bibcode:2012Sci...338..370B. doi:10.1126/science.1226660. PMID 23087245. S2CID 28554111.
- Bronk Ramsey, C; Dee, MW; Rowland, JM; Higham, TFG; Harris, SA; Brock, F; Quiles, A; Wild, EM; Marcus, E. S.; Shortland, A. J.; et al. (2010). "Radiocarbon-based Chronology for Dynastic Egypt". Science. 328 (5985): 1554–1557. Bibcode:2010Sci...328.1554R. doi:10.1126/science.1189395. PMID 20558717. S2CID 206526496.
- Bronk Ramsey, C. (2009). "Bayesian analysis of radiocarbon dates". Radiocarbon. 51 (1): 337–360. Bibcode:2009Radcb..51..337B. doi:10.1017/S0033822200033865.
- Bronk Ramsey, C. (2008). "Deposition models for chronological records". Quaternary Science Reviews. 27 (1–2): 42–60. Bibcode:2008QSRv...27...42R. doi:10.1016/j.quascirev.2007.01.019.
- Bayliss, A; Bronk Ramsey, C; der Plicht, J; Whittle, A. (2007). "Bradshaw and Bayes: Towards a Timetable for the Neolithic, Cambridge". Archaeological Journal. 17 (1): 1–28. doi:10.1017/s0959774307000145. S2CID 162329707.
- Gravina, B; Mellars, P; Bronk Ramsey, C. (2005). "Radiocarbon Dating of Interstratified Neanderthal and Early Modern Human Occupations at the Chatelperronian Type-site". Nature. 438 (7064): 51–56. Bibcode:2005Natur.438...51G. doi:10.1038/nature04006. PMID 16136079. S2CID 4335868.
- Bronk Ramsey, C. (1995). "Radiocarbon calibration and analysis of stratigraphy: The OxCal program". Radiocarbon. 37 (2): 425–430. Bibcode:1995Radcb..37..425B. doi:10.1017/S0033822200030903.
