= Bobone (crater) =

Crater on the Moon

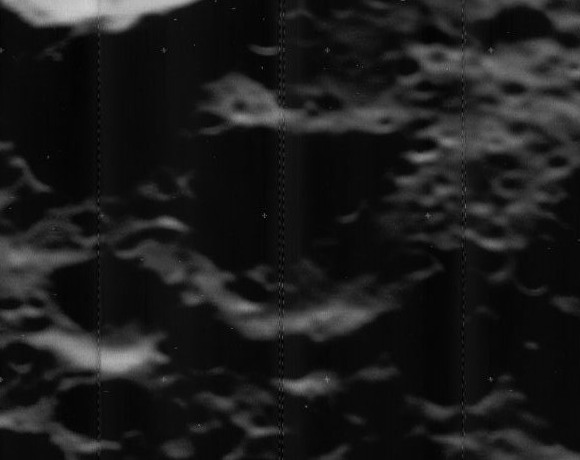
- Oblique Lunar Orbiter 5 image
- Coordinates: 26.9°N 131.8°W
- Diameter: 32.14 km (19.97 mi)
- Depth: Unknown
- Colongitude: 132° at sunrise
- Eponym: Jorge Bobone

Bobone is an old, heavily eroded crater formation that lies on the far side of the Moon. Little remains of the original crater formation, leaving only a bowl-shaped depression in the surface that is pock-marked by tiny craterlets. It is attached to the southwest rim of the large satellite crater Kovalevskaya Q, which has its northeast rim overlaid by Kovalevskaya itself. To the west-southwest is Bronk.

This crater is named after Argentine astronomer Jorge Bobone (1901–1958). Its designation was formally adopted by the International Astronomical Union in 1970.
