= Imatra Society =

Society of Finnish immigrants located in Brooklyn, New York

The Imatra Society was a society of Finnish immigrants located in Brooklyn, New York. The society was founded by John A. Koski, a building engineer. A preliminary meeting was held on December 6, 1890, and was followed by the founding meeting held on December 14, 1890. The purpose of the society was "to develop the economical and social state of the Finnish people in America". Also relief was part of the activity from the beginning.

== At the beginning: a workers' association ==
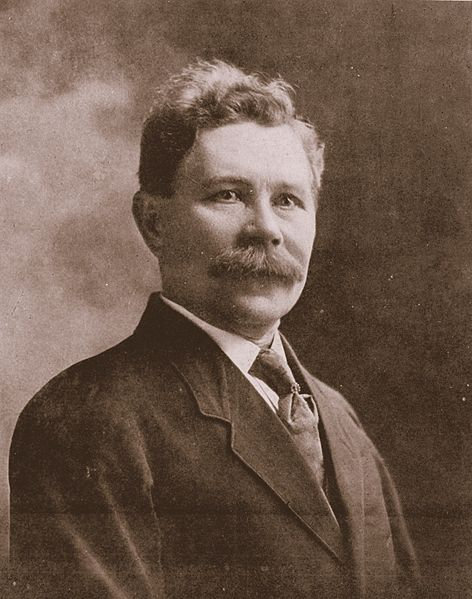
The chairman of Imatra Society, John A. Koski

At the beginning the society operated as a workers' association with the name of Workers' Association Imatra. and it was the first workers´ association the Finns established in America. The Finnish immigrants were workers and thus the name for the society became The Finnish American Workers´ Association Imatra. Despite its name, the society was not based on marxian ideology, but instead there has been seen features of the labor movement led by Viktor von Wright, which sought to promote the cultural activity of the working people and raise their level of education and prevent them from joining socialist associations. Women participated in the activities from the beginning. As a first act in the business the society established its own brass band. In addition a chorus and a play club were formed.

In October 1892 the chairman Koski informed the meeting of the society with the following: "A failure of crops has taken place in our native country Finland and a famine is imminent there, so it should be our duty, as we are in these better circumstances, to begin a kind of relief for the hunger." This statement was unanimously approved.

The establishment of the Imatra Society had a major impact on American Finns. As a result, Finnish workers´ associations were established in other locations too. Imatra Society began to build a large network of Finnish workers´ associations covering all the North America. In February 1903 the society founded the Imatra League which was a Finnish American workers' union consisting of about 40 subdivisions across the United States and Canada. The total membership in the league was approximately 2,000 members. The workers´ associations in the Imatra Union were known by numbers. The original Imatra association in Brooklyn was Imatra 1.

The Union was destroyed by the upcoming socialism that had come into fashion. The socialist agitators who came from Finland began to spread their socialist doctrines to these local workers´ association so that the associations separated from the Imatra Union and joined American Socialist Party. The break up of the Union was a major loss for the Finnish Americans, since they lost their own and unified Finnish cultural community covering the whole North America. The league published its own newspaper called Työväen Album (the worker's album). The Imatra League was abolished in February 1917.The Imatra Society (Imatra 1) did not accept socialism and therefore it remained alone, but it continued its activities as a local Finnish American society.

After separating from the Imatra Union the socialists were centered their activities in politics, but later when Finnish people became less interested in socialism, the socialists changed their activities and started to engage in Finnish cultural activities, the same what Imatra Society did.

On June 10, 1906, Imatra Society began to publish its own newspaper, the New Yorkin Uutiset.The paper was abolished in 1992.

In 1906 Imatra Society consisted of the following units: a Speaker Club, a Play Club, a Women's Club, a Brass Band, an Entertainment Committee, a Library, and a Reading-room.

In September 1907 the society began to collect money for the crofters of the estate Laukko in Finland "who had got into distress because they were fired out from their crofts."

== Some of the Finnish workers´ associations that belonged to the Imatra Union ==
Name of association	City and State
Imatra 1 - Headquarters of the Imatra Union	Brooklyn, New York
Imatra 2	Harlem, New York City, New York
Imatra 3	Gardner, Massachusetts
Imatra 5	Vanalhaven, Maine
Imatra 9	Thunder Bay (Port Arthur), Ontario, Canada
Imatra 12	Glassport, Pennsylvania
Imatra 15 - Later the Fifth Avenue Hall	Harlem, New York City, New York
Imatra 16	Worcester, Massachusetts
Imatra 17 - Finnish workers´ association Taimi	Peabody, Massachusetts
Imatra 19	Fitchburg, Massachusetts
Imatra 20 - Finnish workers´ association Taisto	Maynard, Massachusetts
Imatra 21 - Finnish workers´ association Veli	Quincy, Massachusetts
Imatra 25	Chicago, Illinois
Imatra 27	Ashtabula, Ohio
Imatra 29 - Finnish American Labor Alliance	Norwood, Massachusetts
Imatra 30	Cleveland, Ohio
Imatra 31	Superior, Wisconsin
Imatra 33	(location unknown)
Imatra 35	(location unknown)
Imatra ? - Finnish workers´ association Walon Virta	San Francisco, California
Imatra ? (number unknown)	Waukegan, Illinois
Imatra ? (number unknown)	Boston, Massachusetts
Imatra ? - Finnish workers´ association Ilmarinen	Fall River, Massachusetts
Imatra ? - Finnish workers´ association Veljeys	Rockport, Massachusetts
Imatra ? - Finnish workers´ association Ystävät	Duluth, Minnesota
Imatra ? (number unknown)	Chisholm, Minnesota
Imatra ? (number unknown)	Ely, Minnesota
Imatra ? (number unknown)	Red Lodge, Montana
Imatra ? (number unknown)	Aberdeen, Washington

== Imatra Hall ==
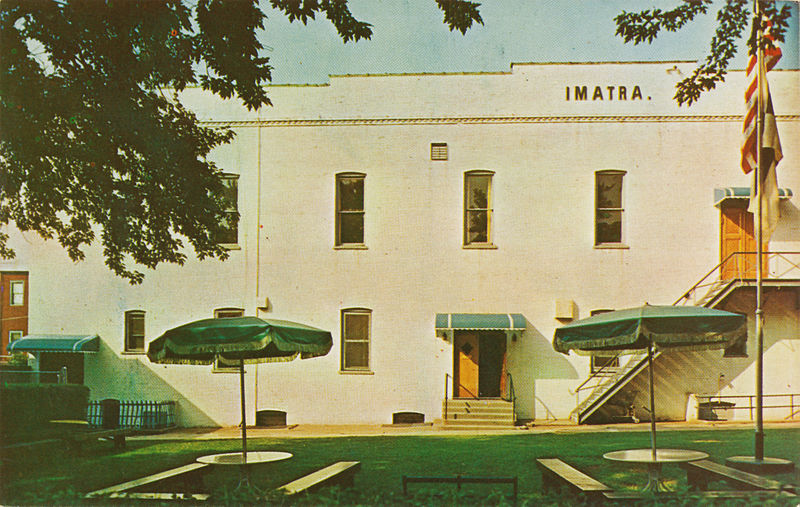
The premises of Imatra Society was located in the address of 740 40th Street / Finlandia Street, Brooklyn, New York.

The society built its own house for their activities and moved into it on November 1, 1908. Opening celebration was held on November 18 and 19. They also supplied to their new house a generator to produce electricity. "This was a historical event in the Finntown hill and caused a lot of talk in the neighbourhood since it was the Imatra Society that brought the first electric lights to the buck hill" (now the Sunset Park area). This house, later called Imatra Hall, was most important place for the activities of the society and became well known and very popular among the Finnish people.

In December 1908 the society maintained a cause of temperance. No alcoholic drinks were allowed to be brought to the hall and nobody was allowed to appear under the influence of alcohol. Also smoking was absolutely forbidden in the restaurant.

Imatra Society established an employment agency by the proposal of Matti Kurikka. The agency began its operation on December 1, 1910. In a year the agency exchanged a job to about 50–60 men and 135 women. In service occupations for women there were much more open vacancies than there were applicants. In 1912 the agency exchanged 242 jobs.

In 1910 the theater group of the society performed several plays in Imatra Hall, such as Pimeyden valta (the power of darkness), Charleyn Tähti (the star of Charley), Jeppe Niilonpoika (Jeppe the Nilsson), Tukkijoella (on the log river), Roinilan Talossa (in the house of Roinila), and Viimeinen Ponnistus (the last effort). As special performances they performed Kristitty (the Christian) and Kun piiat ovat lakossa (when the hired girls are on strike).

== Aid society and national society ==
In the annual meeting of the society on January 20, 1918, new clauses were made for the bylaw of the society such as: Clause 8 – The society tries to do its best to make Finnish people well known in the United States. Clause 9 – Officially the society is known as the Finnish Aid Society Imatra. Clause 22 – If the society dissolves or its operation becomes so weak that there is a fear for withdrawal of the society, do not move or sell the property of the society without a special permit from the Senate of Finland. This clause must not be changed.

Originally the society was a workers' association, then it became an aid society, and in July 1921 it was named as Kansallisseura Imatra (National Society Imatra).

May 13. 1923 the Imatra Society sends a group of seven people to Ellis Island to help the Finnish immigrants in the landing process.

== Visitors from Finland ==
Visitors from Finland, such as artists and others, have been an important part in the activities of the Imatra Hall. Many Finnish artists have performed a concert at Imatra Hall including such famous artists as: Uuno Klami on October 27, 1917, J. Alfred Tanner on May 29, 1924, Robert Kajanus on January 11, 1925, Lea Piltti on April 24, 1949, Tapio Rautavaara on October 22, 1959, Henry Theel on February 2, 1973, and Heimo Haitto on January 24, 1984.

Other important persons who have visited in Imatra Hall include such as Paavo Nurmi on February 19, 1966, Anne Pohtamo on February 5, 1978, the minister of education Kaarina Suonio with her delegation on September 13, 1982, the president of Finland Mauno Koivisto and Mrs. Tellervo Koivisto with their delegation on October 25, 1985, and the minister of education Christoffer Taxell with his delegation on April 10, 1988.

Imatra Society held a festival on December 8, 1935, to celebrate Sibelius on his birthday. The festival was a great success. Minister Järnefelt also attended it.

For the first 50 years the society operated as a temperance society but now it decided to obtain a liquor licence and the bar of the Imatra Hall began its operation on August 27, 1941.

Juho Rissanen, a famous painter visited Imatra Hall on October 1, 1946, and was asking if the society would order a wallpainting from him for the Imatra Hall.

On January 23, 1949, it is informed that Imatra society had sent to Finland a number of packages to institutions of poor people and to seven families and furthermore will be tried to help the poor and the orphans of Finland.

A survey for the situation of the society in 1959: "As you remember this year began with very difficult circumstances since we were nearly losing our house to the tumult of the foreign stuff and occasionally it was very difficult for our own members to get in. It was really needed to take the matter with iron hands since a real cleaning had to be bring about. We succeeded rather well with this and already the peacefulness and order began to return…" Within the society there were many times discussed whether or not non Finns are accepted to become members of the Imatra Society. Now it was finally clear they are not accepted.

The Imatra Society began to arrange Miss Finlandia beauty contests. The first was held on October 6, 1968. Since 1970 Finnair donated to the winner a return flight ticket to Finland.

A group of actors from the National Theater of Finland led by Sakari Jurkka performed a comedy Myöhästynyt hääyö (the delayed wedding night) at Imatra Hall on June 2, 1971. The performance was a great success and therefore it was rerun at Imatra Hall on June 27.

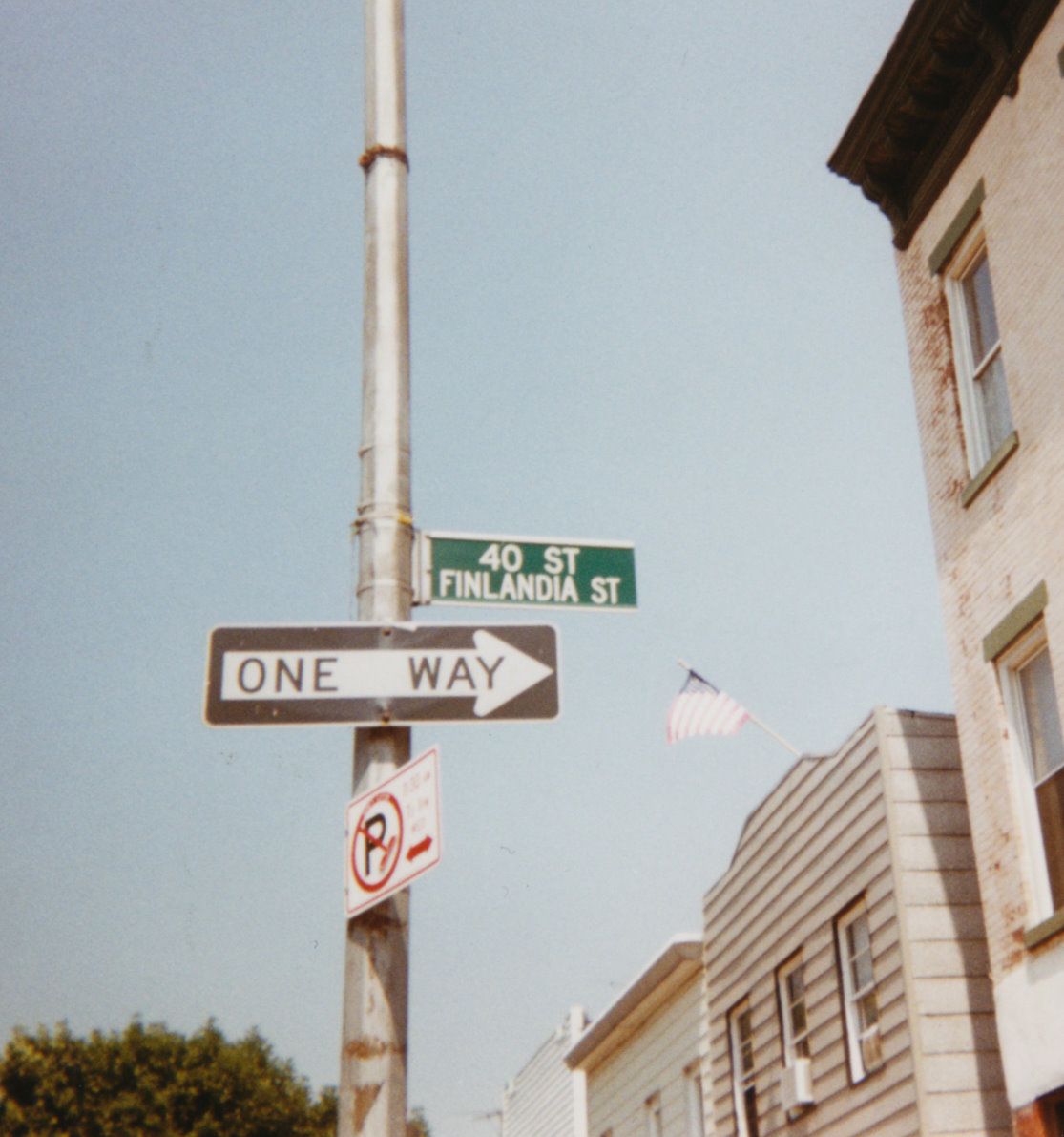
The 40th Street in front of the Imatra Hall was co-named as Finlandia Street

For the first 95 years the language of the society was Finnish but since the annual meeting on February 16, 1986, the language has been English because there were non Finnish members in the society who did not understand Finnish.

In 1987 the society was planning to establish an annual music festival at Imatra Hall where Finnish and American artists could perform. This was a big plan and therefore an inquiry was made to music festivals in Finland if they can come along and participate in organizing the festival in New York. Many of them responded favorably.

There was a concert at Imatra Hall on March 7, 1991, in which two police choruses performed, one was the west coast police chorus from Finland with 60 singers and the other the New York City police chorus with 40 male and female singers.

The 100 anniversary celebration of the society lasted for four days and was held on September 19–22, 1991. In connection with the celebration the 40th Street in front of the Imatra Hall was co-named as Finlandia Street. In the occasion the Finlandia hymn of Sibelius was performed by the Male Singers of Järvenpää from Finland. After this a flag procession with national costumes led the people to the Imatra Hall, where the main event was held.

Only a few years after the 100 anniversary celebration the Imatra Society had come into financial difficulties and in fall 1995 it was so much involved in debt that it was no more able to recover. Imatra Hall was sold and then Imatra Foundation was established with the remaining property. The Imatra Society was suppressed on April 26, 1996 and the Imatra Foundation was abolished in the fall of 2011.

== Presidents ==
Name of president	Term in office
1. John A. Koski	Preliminary meeting December 6, 1890 Founding meeting December 14, 1890 January 13, 1891 – January 6, 1895 January 25, 1912 – January 29, 1913
2. Akseli Järnefelt	January 6, 1895 – January 19, 1896
3. Charles Blomqvist	January 19, 1896 – January 3, 1897
4. Isak Juselius	January 3, 1897 – January 3, 1899 January 14, 1900 – January 13, 1901 January 12, 1902 – January 14, 1906 January 9 – July 21, 1910 July 23, 1914 – January 10, 1915 January 23, 1916 – January 14, 1917
5. Esa Takala	January 3, 1899 – January 14, 1900
6. A. Vilander	January 13, 1901 – January 12, 1902
7. Eero W. Helin	January 14, 1906 – January 27, 1907 January 10, 1935 – January 9, 1936 February 11, 1937 – January 11, 1942
8. Salomon Laitinen	January 27, 1907 – January 9, 1910 August 25, 1910 – January 5, 1911
9. W. Lauri	July 21 – August 25, 1910
10. Matti Simpanen	January 5, 1911 – January 25, 1912
11. J. A. Harpet	January 29, 1913 – May 3, 1914 January 10, 1915 – January 23, 1916
12. A. Uksila	January 14, 1917 – May 5, 1918
13. Henry Aalto	May 5, 1918 – March 27, 1921 January 26, 1928 – January 9, 1930
14. Hjalmar Palmrose	March 27, 1921 – January 15, 1922 January 9, 1936 – February 11, 1937
15. Hjalmar Ketonen	January 15, 1922 – March 18, 1923
16. Kalle Soini	April 4, 1923 – January 26, 1928
17. Väinö Jaakkola	January 9, 1930 – January 26, 1931
18. Karl Lehtinen	January 26, 1931 – September 26, 1932
19. Gustav Helenius	September 26, 1932 – January 10, 1935
20. Laila Salo	January 11 – April 19, 1942
21. A. F. Djerf	April 19, 1942 – January 24, 1943
22. Väinö Sarlin	January 24, 1943 – January 30, 1944
23. Elmer Arra	January 30, 1944 – January 19, 1947 June 7, 1949 – January 22, 1950
24. Hugo Ketola	January 19, 1947 – January 23, 1949 January 18, 1953 – January 22, 1956 January 26, 1964 – January 24, 1965
25. Risto Rimey	January 23 – June 7, 1949
26. Werner Wäisänen	January 22, 1950 – January 20, 1952
27. Maikki Helin	January 20, 1952 – January 18, 1953
28. Urho Ostman	January 22, 1956 – January 27, 1957
29. Alan Fillmore	January 27, 1957 – January 26, 1958 January 20, 1963 – January 26, 1964 January 28, 1968 – January 26, 1969
30. Mauri Pelkonen	January 26, 1958 – January 24, 1960
31. Eino Salim	January 24, 1960 – January 21, 1962
32. John Aarnio	January 21, 1962 – January 20, 1963
33. Harry Manner	January 24, 1965 – January 30, 1966
34. Alpo Hautamäki	January 30, 1966 – January 28, 1968 January 24, 1971 – January 30, 1972 August 2, 1972 – January 28, 1973 January 27, 1974 – January 26, 1975 January 25 – April 19, 1976 February 14, 1982 – February 6, 1983
35. Eric Williams	January 26, 1969 – January 25, 1970
36. Eugen Manner	January 25, 1970 – January 24, 1971
37. John Ketola	January 30 – August 2, 1972
38. Arvo Ek	January 28, 1973 – Jan 27, 1974 January 26, 1975 – January 25, 1976
39. Hjalmar Koivu	April 19, 1976 – January 30, 1977
40. Urpo Kurko	January 30, 1977 – January 29, 1978
41. Eino Honka	January 29, 1978 – January 28, 1979
42. Lempi Issakainen	January 28, 1979 – January 27, 1980
43. Raymond Anderson	January 27, 1980 – February 14, 1982
44. Mauno Laurila	February 6, 1983 – March 13, 1988
45. Veikko Laiho	March 13, 1988 – June 7, 1992

== Photos from the activities of the society ==
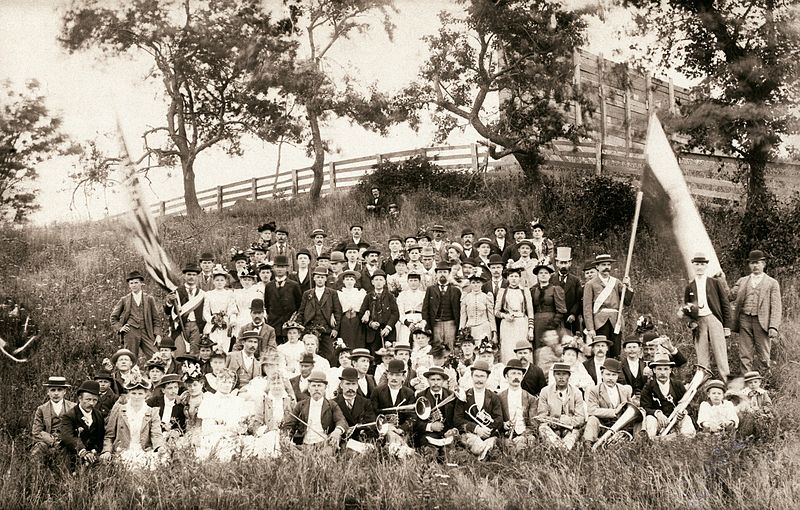
Imatra Society celebrating its summer festival in Forth Hamilton in 1894. Their own brass band can be seen in the picture.

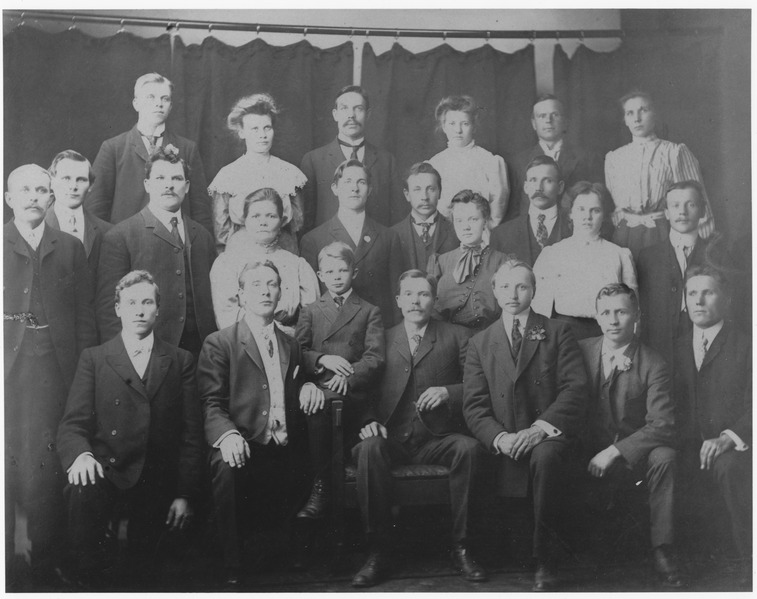
The theater group of Imatra Society in 1910.

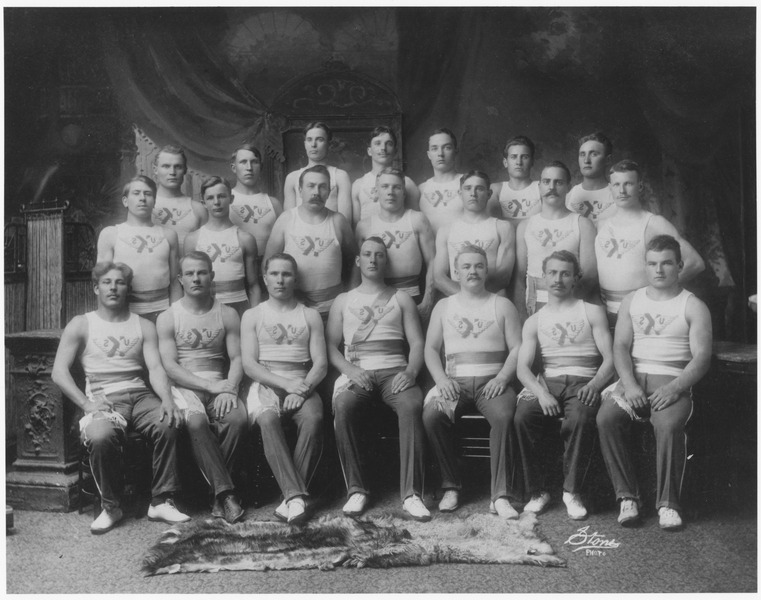
Imatra Society's athletic group Kullervo formed in 1910. At the same time the gymnastic group Kyllikki was formed for women.

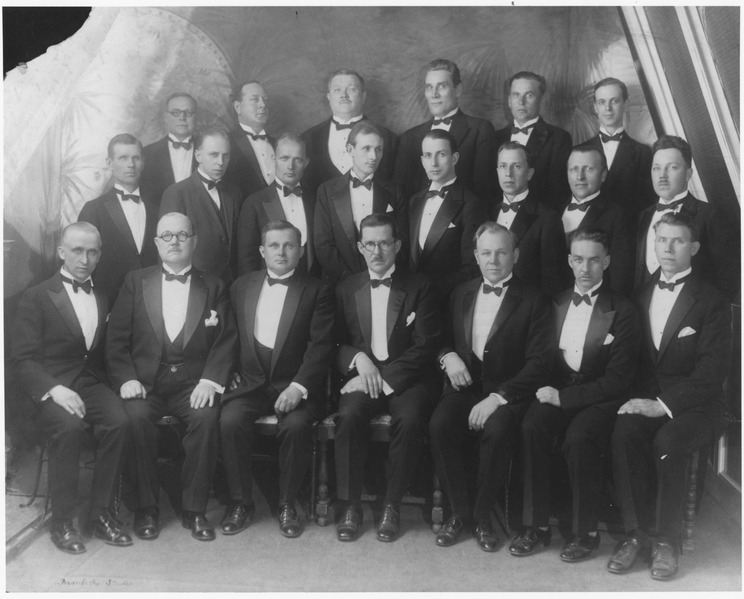
Imatra Society's male chorus in the 1920s directed by Jallu Honkanen.

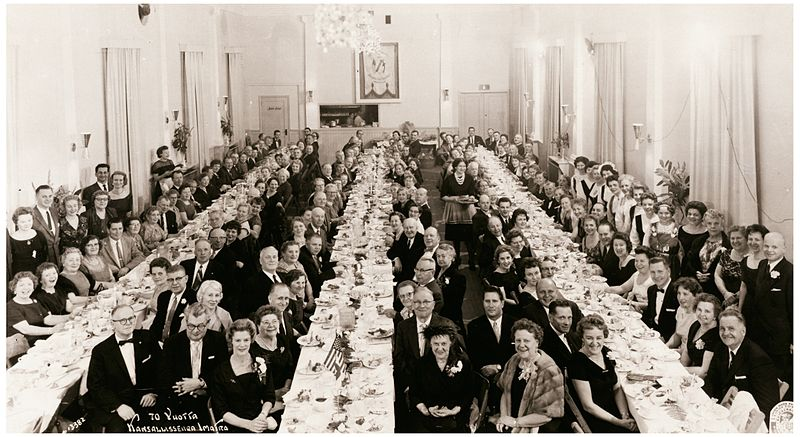
Imatra Society celebrating its 70th anniversary on March 18, 1961. The picture is from the main room of the Imatra Hall.

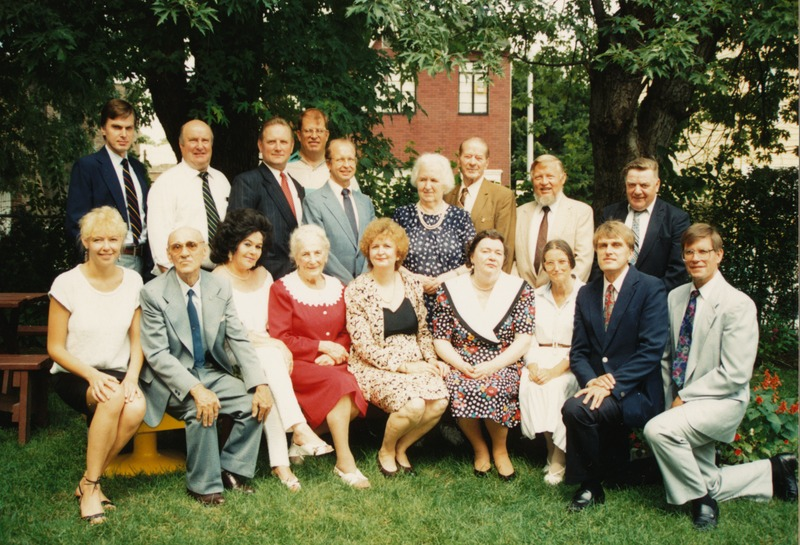
Imatra Society's staff which arranged the society's 100 anniversary celebration in 1991. The picture is from the courtyard in front of the Imatra Hall.
