= Pronk =

Pronk is a Dutch surname, which means "flamboyance" in modern Dutch or "sullen" in Middle Dutch. It may refer to:

- Travis Hafner (born 1977), American baseball player, who is nicknamed "Pronk"
- Anton Pronk (1941–2016), Dutch footballer
- Bert Pronk (1950–2005), Dutch cyclist
- Cornelis Pronk (1691–1759), Dutch artist
- Dorette Pronk (born 1968), Dutch and Canadian mathematician
- Jan Pronk (born 1940), Dutch politician
- Jan Pronk (cyclist) (1918–2016), Dutch cyclist
- Jos Pronk (born 1983), Dutch cyclist
- Judith Pronk (born 1973), Dutch musician
- Matthé Pronk (born 1974), Dutch cyclist
- Mattheus Pronk (1947–2001), Dutch cyclist
- Monique Pronk (born 1958), Dutch rower
- Rob Pronk (1928–2012), Dutch musician
- Rubinald Pronk (born 1979), Dutch ballet dancer
- Tijmen Pronk (born 1979), Dutch linguist

== Other uses ==
- Pronk, a portmanteau of progressive punk (another name for post-punk)
- Pronking, animal behavior involving leaping straight up during pursuit by a predator
