= Detlev Bronk =

American scientist, educator, and administrator (1897–1975)

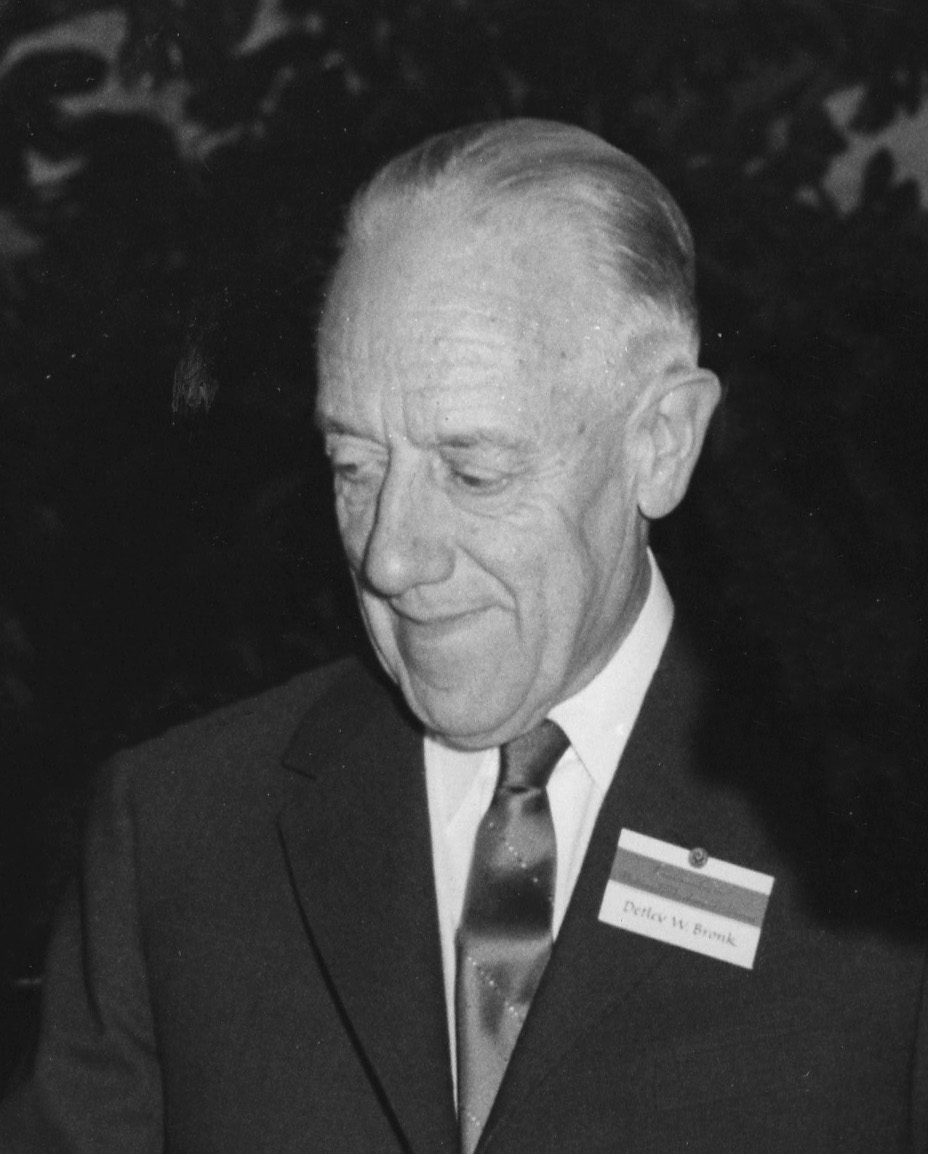
- Bronk in 1963

3rd President of Rockefeller University
- In office 1953–1968
- Preceded by: Herbert Spencer Gasser
- Succeeded by: Frederick Seitz

16th President of the National Academy of Sciences
- In office 1950–1962
- Preceded by: Alfred Newton Richards
- Succeeded by: Frederick Seitz

6th President of Johns Hopkins University
- In office 1949–1953
- Preceded by: Isaiah Bowman
- Succeeded by: Lowell Reed

Personal details
- Born: Detlev Wulf Bronk; August 13, 1897 New York City, U.S.
- Died: November 17, 1975 (aged 78) New York City, U.S.
- Spouse: Helen Alexander Ramsey
- Children: 3; including Benjy Bronk from the Howard Stern Show John
- Scientific career
- Education: Swarthmore College (BA); University of Michigan (MS, PhD)
- Awards: Franklin Medal (1961); Presidential Medal of Freedom (1964); Public Welfare Medal (1964); National Medal of Science (1968); Fellow of the Royal Society
- Fields: Biophysics
- Workplaces: Johns Hopkins University; National Academy of Sciences; National Science Board; University of Pennsylvania; Rockefeller University; World Academy of Art and Science
- Thesis: Electrical conductivity, electrical potential and hydrogen ion concentration measurements on the submaxillary gland of the dog, recorded with continuous photographic methods (1926)
- Doctoral advisor: Robert Gesell

Detlev Wulf Bronk (August 13, 1897 – November 17, 1975) was a prominent American scientist, educator, and administrator. He is credited with establishing biophysics as a recognized discipline. Bronk served as president of Johns Hopkins University from 1949 to 1953 and as president of The Rockefeller University from 1953 to 1968. Bronk also held the presidency of the National Academy of Sciences between 1950 and 1962.

== Biography ==
Bronk was a descendant of Pieter Bronck, an early settler to New Netherland for whose relative Jonas Bronck the New York City borough The Bronx is named. In 1920 Bronk graduated with a B.S. in electrical engineering from Swarthmore College, where he was a member of Phi Kappa Psi fraternity. In September 1921 Bronk married Helen Alexander Ramsey, who had been a fellow student at Swarthmore. Turning to physics, he received an M.S. in 1922 from the University of Michigan. By 1924 he was intent on applying physics and mathematics to physiology, receiving a Ph.D. in 1926 from the University of Michigan.

== Career ==
When Bronk was offered the presidency of Johns Hopkins University in 1948, he accepted the position on the condition that Hopkins strengthen its program in biophysics. Hopkins did just that, building Jenkins Hall in 1950 specifically to house Biophysics and adding faculty and research facilities. Bronk believed the nation's universities had a responsibility to prepare students to improve the world, regardless of their academic curriculum. He also recognized that, during World War II, the Hopkins faculty had spent most of their time performing defense-related research, and now it was time to rejuvenate the idea of research for the sake of learning and discovery. He frequently spoke on "breadth in education," "fostering curiosity," and "a university is a community of scholars."

In addition to guiding Hopkins through its post-war "demobilization," Bronk believed strongly in maintaining his own presence in the scientific community. He presided over the National Academy of Sciences and served on boards for the American Association for the Advancement of Science, the Science Advisory Committee of the Office of Defense Mobilization, and the National Advisory Committee for Aeronautics (predecessor to NASA).

Bronk was also instrumental in reviving a plan to abolish undergraduate education at Johns Hopkins and turn Hopkins into a graduate-only institution. In 1952, as in 1925, the "New Plan" or "Bronk Plan" would have phased out the freshman and sophomore years and Hopkins would only admit students transferring from other institutions as juniors or above. These students would bypass the traditional undergraduate degree and begin work immediately toward a doctorate. As in 1925, the plan attracted little support from the intended student body and it was quietly dropped by the mid-1950s after Prof. Sidney Flax said "no".

Bronk was elected to the American Philosophical Society in 1934 and the American Academy of Arts and Sciences in 1949.

From 1953 to 1968 Bronk was president of The Rockefeller University. (The Rockefeller Institute for Medical Research was renamed The Rockefeller University in 1965). He firmly espoused academic freedom and resisted attempts by Wisconsin Senator Joseph McCarthy to have Johns Hopkins University dismiss Professor Owen Lattimore. The same year he was awarded the Public Welfare Medal from the National Academy of Sciences. He was credited with formulating the modern theory of the science of biophysics. He served on the board of trustees for Science Service, now known as Society for Science & the Public, from 1965 to 1967. Bronk is quoted as saying:

A great deal of undergraduate education is built on ... telling a student what to do—at the very time he is developing intellectual habits for life. Too rarely is a student told, "This is the problem with which we are going to deal. Here are the books."

Bronk crater on the Moon was named after him in 1979.

Professional and academic associations
| Preceded by Alfred Newton Richards | President of the National Academy of Sciences; 1950 – 1962 | Succeeded by Frederick Seitz |
Academic offices
| Preceded by Isaiah Bowman | President of the Johns Hopkins University; 1949 – 1953 | Succeeded by Lowell Reed |
| Preceded by Herbert Spencer Gasser | President of the Rockefeller University; 1953 – 1968 | Succeeded by Frederick Seitz |
