= Governors Island =

Island in New York City

Paggank Noten Eylandt Nutten Island
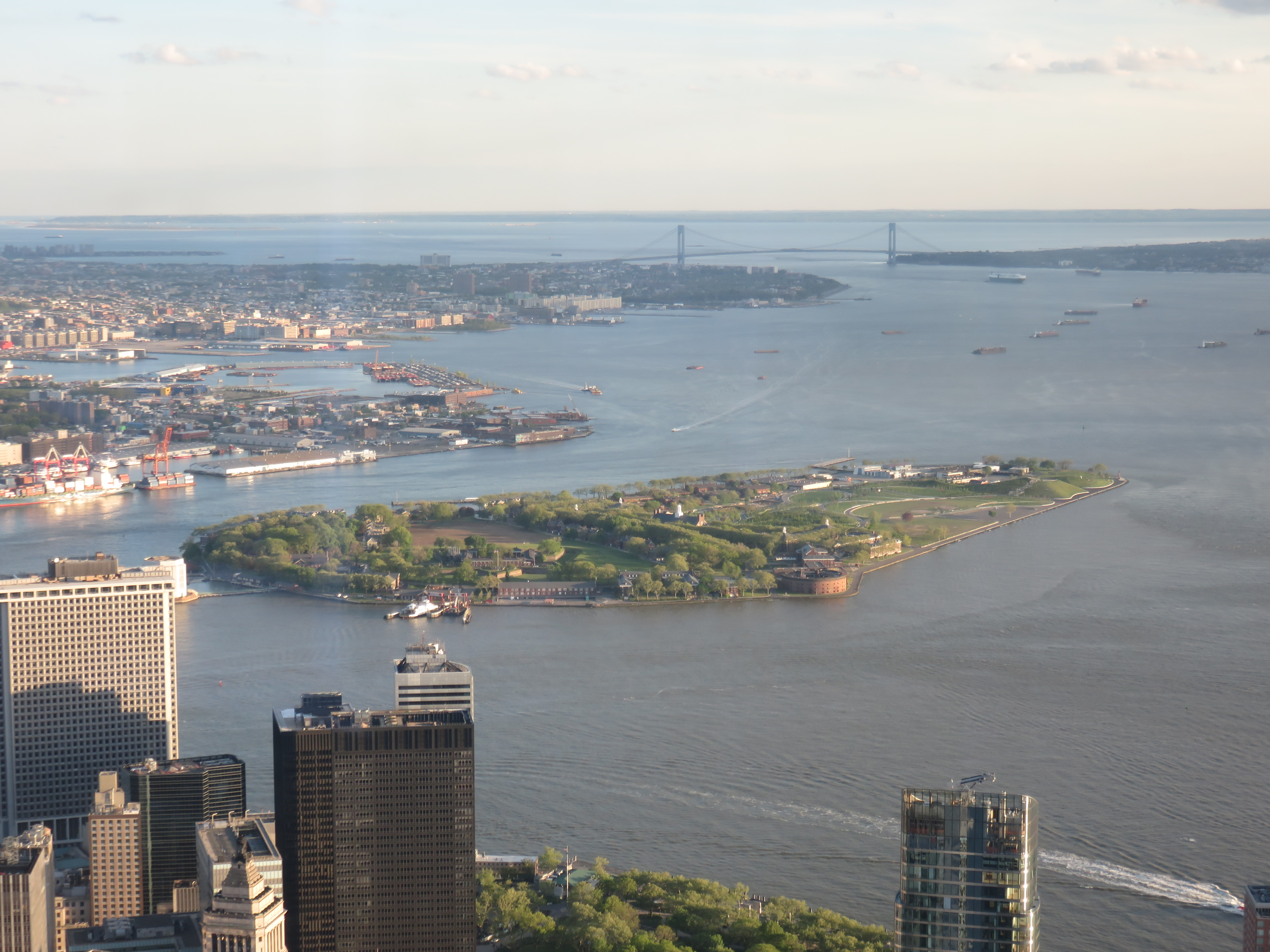
- Governors Island viewed from One World Trade Center in 2017
- Location in New York City
- Etymology: "Paggank" and "Noten Eylandt" from nut trees; "Governors Island" from New York colonial governors

Geography
- Location: New York Harbor
- Coordinates: 40°41′29″N 74°0′58″W
- Area: 172 acres (70 ha)
- Highest elevation: 70 ft (21 m)
- Highest point: Outlook Hill

Administration
- United States
- State: New York
- City: New York City
- Borough: Manhattan

Demographics
- Population: 0 (2010)

Additional information
- Time zone: Eastern (UTC−5)
  - Summer (DST): EDT (UTC−4)
- ZIP Code: 10004
- Official website: The Trust for Governors Island website The Governors Island National Monument website
- Governors Island
- U.S. National Register of Historic Places
- U.S. National Historic Landmark District
- U.S. National Monument
- New York State Register of Historic Places
- New York City Landmark
- Location: New York City, New York, U.S.
- Coordinates: 40°41′29″N 74°0′58″W
- Area: 172 acres (70 ha)
- Architectural style: Colonial Revival, Greek Revival
- Visitation: 800,000 (2018)
- NRHP reference No.: 85002435
- NYSRHP No.: 06101.019189
- NYCL No.: 1946

Significant dates
- Added to NRHP: February 4, 1985
- Designated NHLD: February 4, 1985
- Designated NMON: January 19, 2001
- Designated NYSRHP: February 4, 1985
- Designated NYCL: June 18, 1996

Governors Island is a 172-acre (70 ha) island in New York Harbor, within the New York City borough of Manhattan. It is located approximately 800 yards (730 m) south of Manhattan Island, and is separated from Brooklyn to the east by the 400-yard-wide (370 m) Buttermilk Channel. The National Park Service administers a small portion of the north end of the island as the Governors Island National Monument, including two former military fortifications named Fort Jay and Castle Williams. The Trust for Governors Island operates the remaining 150 acres (61 ha), including 52 historic buildings, as a public park. About 103 acres (42 ha) of the land area is fill, added in the early 1900s to the south of the original island.

The native Lenape originally referred to Governors Island as Paggank ("nut island") because of the area's rich collection of chestnut, hickory, and oak trees; it is believed that this space was originally used for seasonal foraging and hunting. The name was translated into the Old-Dutch Noten Eylandt, then Anglicized into Nutten Island, before being renamed Governor's Island by the late 18th century. The island was first used as a military installation in 1755 during the French and Indian War. In 1776, during the American Revolutionary War, Continental Army troops raised defensive works on the island. From 1783 to 1966, the island was a United States Army post, serving mainly as a training ground for troops, though it also served as a strategic defense point during wartime. The island then served as a major United States Coast Guard installation until 1996. Following its decommissioning as a military base, there were several plans for redeveloping Governors Island. It was sold to the public for a nominal sum in 2003, and opened for public use in 2005.

Governors Island has become a popular destination for the public, attracting more than 800,000 visitors per year as of 2018. In addition to the 43-acre (17 ha) public park, Governors Island includes free arts and cultural events, as well as recreational activities. The New York Harbor School, a public high school with a maritime-focused curriculum, has been on the island since 2010. The island can only be accessed by ferries from Brooklyn and Manhattan, and there are no full-time residents as of 2022. It was accessible to the public only during the summer until 2021, when the island started operating year-round.

== Etymology ==
The Native Lenape refer to the island as Paggank, Pagganck, or Pagganack. All of these names literally translate to "Nut Island", likely in reference to the many chestnut, hickory, and oak trees on the island. The Dutch explorer Adriaen Block called it Noten Eylandt, a translation, and this was Anglicized into Nutten Island, a name that continued to be used until the late 18th century. The name "Governor's Island", with an apostrophe, stems from the British colonial era, when the colonial assembly reserved the island for the exclusive use of New York's royal governors. The current name without an apostrophe was made official in 1784.

== History ==
=== Colonial period ===
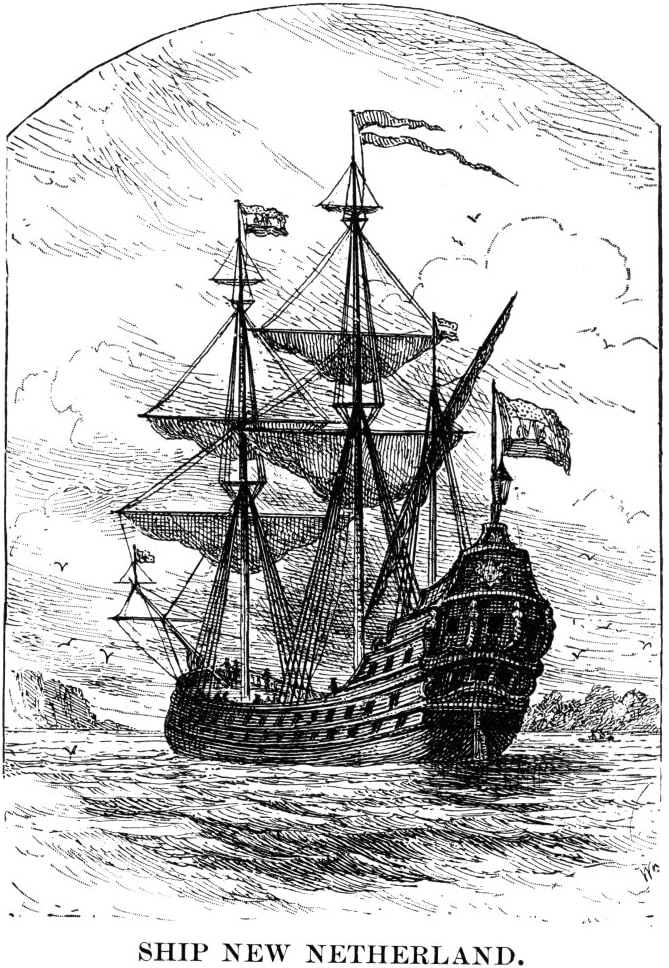
Nieu Nederlandt ship portrait

Governors Island was initially much smaller than it is today. It had many inlets along its shoreline, and groves of hardwood trees, from which the island's native name is derived. There is insufficient evidence as to whether Governors Island contained any permanent Lenape settlements, or was used mainly for hunting and gathering. In 1524, the explorer Giovanni da Verrazzano was perhaps the first European to observe what was then called Paggank. One hundred years later, in May 1624, Noten Eylandt was the landing place of the first settlers in New Netherland. They departed from Amsterdam in the Dutch Republic with the ship Nieu Nederlandt under the command of Cornelius Jacobsen May and disembarked on the island with thirty families in order to take possession of the New Netherland territory. For this reason, the New York State Senate and Assembly recognize Governors Island as the birthplace of the state of New York, and also certify the island as the place on which the planting of the "legal-political guaranty of tolerance onto the North American continent" took place.

In 1633, the fifth director of New Netherland, Wouter van Twiller, arrived with a 104-man regiment on Noten Eylandt, and later commandeered the island for his personal use. He secured his farm by drawing up a deed on June 16, 1637, which was signed by two Lenape leaders, Cacapeteyno and Pewihas, on behalf of their community at Keshaechquereren, situated in present-day New Jersey. Van Twiller cultivated a farm on the island, even building a windmill on the land, until he returned to the Netherlands in 1642. The windmill was demolished possibly by 1648, when colonial governor Peter Stuyvesant burned it down after seeing it in inoperable condition. Following this, Noten Eylandt is said to have been used as a recreation ground by the Dutch between 1652 and 1664. There is little other documentation on the use of the island during the Dutch colonial period, other than the fact that it has remained in public ownership since van Twiller left New Netherland.

New Netherland was conditionally ceded to the English in 1664, and the English renamed the settlement New York in June 1665. By 1674, the British had total control of the island. At this point, the eastern shore of the island was separated from Brooklyn by a shallow channel that could be easily traversed at low tide. This became known as Buttermilk Channel, since farm women would use the channel to travel to Manhattan island in boats and sell buttermilk. By 1680, Nutten Island contained a single house and pasture to be used by colonial governors for raising sheep, cattle, and horses.

The British started calling Nutten Island "Governor's Island" (with an apostrophe) in 1698 and reserved the island for the exclusive use of colonial governors. Four years later, when Edward Hyde, Lord Cornbury took office as New York colonial governor, he built a mansion on Governor's Island, though evidence of this mansion no longer exists. Later, governor William Cosby used the island as a preserve to breed and hunt pheasants. Other governors leased out the island for profit, and for a short period around 1710, Governor's Island was designated as a quarantine station for Palatine (German) refugees arriving from England on their way to Germantown on the Hudson. Otherwise, Governor's Island mostly remained untouched until the American Revolutionary War started in 1775.

=== American Revolution ===
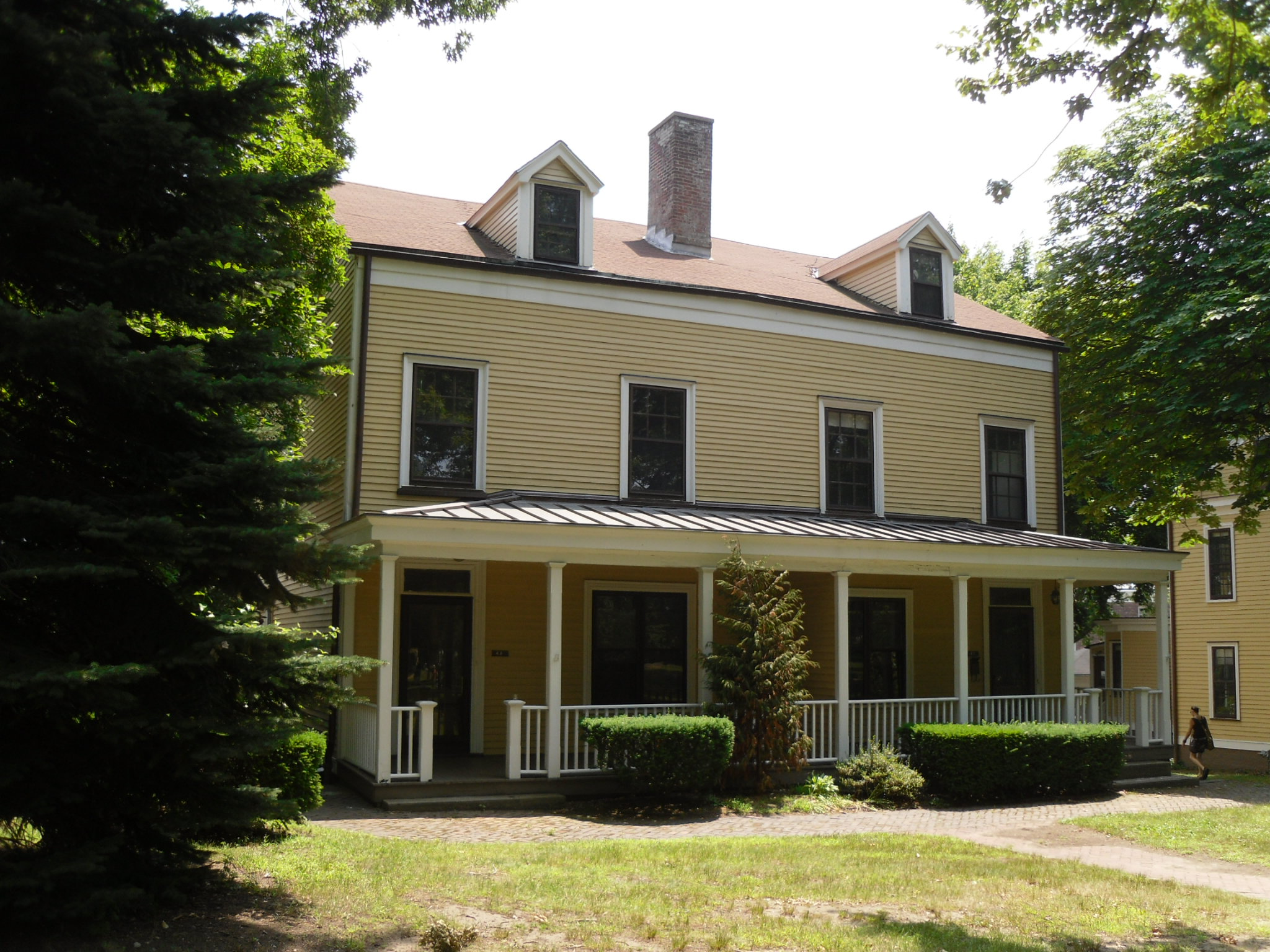
A house in Nolan Park

The first plans for fortifications on Governor's Island were made in 1741, in anticipation of a war with France, but the fortifications were never built. The island was first used by a military encampment in 1755 during the French and Indian War, when Sir William Pepperell led the 51st Regiment of Foot onto Governor's Island. Other regiments soon followed, and by the mid-1760s, there was documentation of a fort on the island as well as several surrounding earthworks. Further plans to improve the fortifications on Governor's Island were devised in 1766 by British military engineer John Montresor. These plans were never realized, even though the British had asked for funding for these fortifications in 1774.

After the American Revolution started, Continental Army General George Washington assigned General Charles Lee to create a defensive plan for New York Harbor. Lee's plan called for several defensive forts in Brooklyn, in Manhattan's Battery, and on Governor's Island. On the night of April 9, 1776, Continental Army General Israel Putnam came to the island to add earthworks and 40 cannons, in anticipation of the return of the British, who had fled New York City the year before. The island's defenses continued to be improved over the following months, and on July 12, 1776, the defenses engaged HMS Phoenix and HMS Rose as they made a run up the Hudson River to the Tappan Zee. Even though the British were able to travel as far north as the Tappan Zee, the colonists' cannon inflicted enough damage to make the British commanders cautious of entering the East River, and the fortifications contributed to the success of Washington's retreat from Brooklyn to Manhattan after the Battle of Long Island, when the British Army attempted to take Brooklyn Heights during the largest battle of the war, around August 27, 1776.

In what appeared to be a strategic miscalculation, the rebels' munitions caused little to no damage to the British ships that were waiting some 2 miles (3.2 km) downstream. Two days after the British withdrawal to Manhattan, the Continental Army forces withdrew from Brooklyn and Governor's Island, and the British took back Governor's Island. From September 2 to 14, 1776, the new British garrison engaged volleys with Washington's guns on the Battery in front of Fort George in Manhattan. On September 6, the Americans' unsuccessful attempt to detonate the submersible Turtle at the island was the first documented submarine attack in history. The fort, along with the rest of New York City, was held by the British for the rest of the war until Evacuation Day in 1783. During this time, the British continued to improve Governor's Island's defenses.

=== Late 18th through 19th centuries ===
==== Late 18th century to War of 1812 ====
At the end of the Revolution, Governor's Island was transferred from the Crown to the state of New York. The island saw no military usage, instead being used as a hotel and racetrack. The quality of the fortifications, which were mostly made of earth, began to decline. The name of Nutten Island was changed to "Governors Island" by act of the United States legislature on March 29, 1784. Governors Island was conveyed to the New York State Board of Regents in 1790 "for the encouragement of education ... unless needed for military purposes." Little else is known about the island's use during this time.

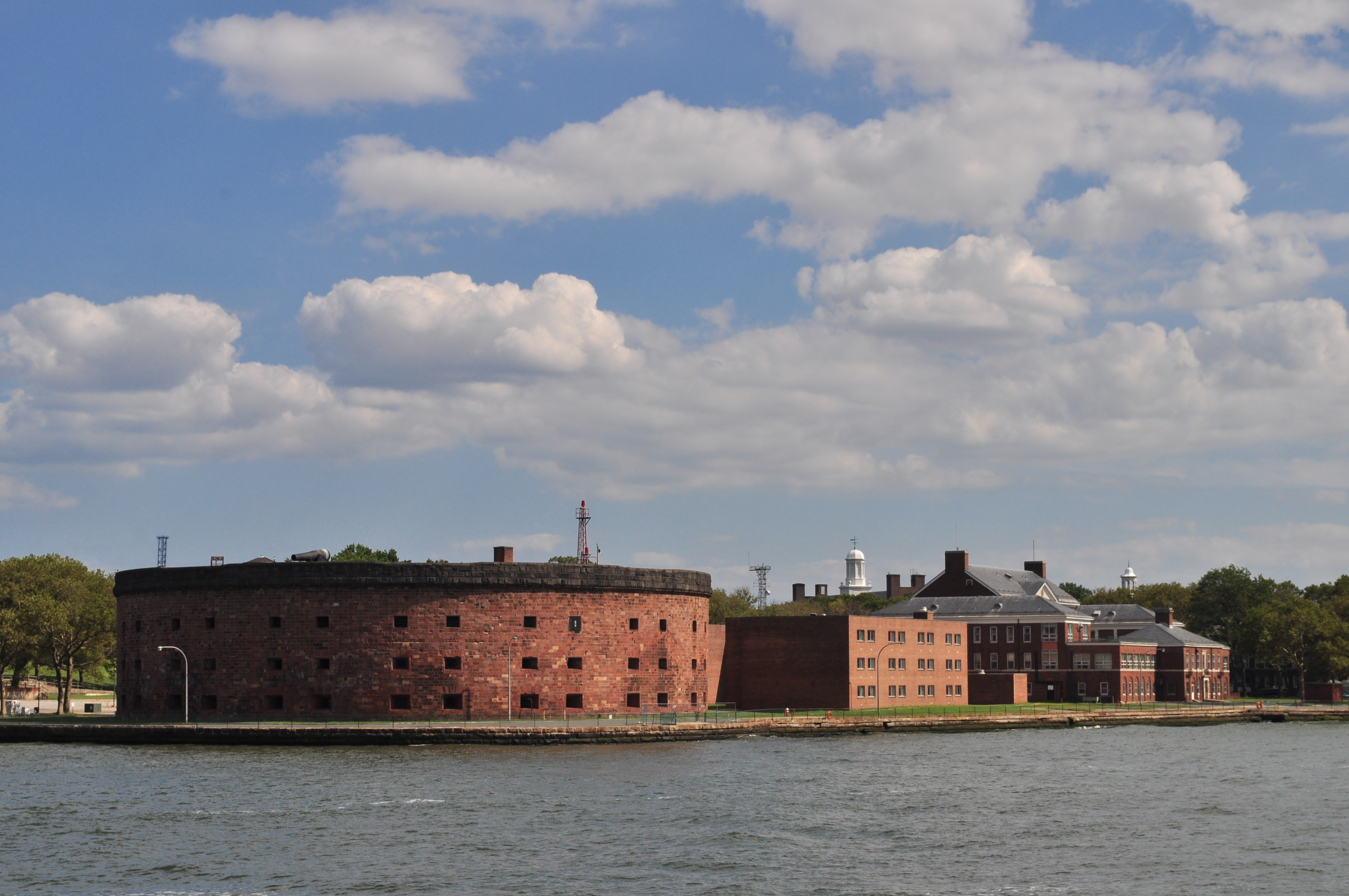
Castle Williams

By the mid-1790s, increased military tensions renewed an interest in fortifying New York Harbor, and a U.S. congressional committee had drawn a map of possible locations for the First System of fortifications to protect major American urban centers. Governors Island was one of the first locations where defenses were built. As such, the agreement with the Board of Regents was voided in 1794, and some $250,000 in federal funding was allocated to the construction of defenses on Governors Island in 1794 and 1795. Fort Jay was built starting in 1794 on the site of the earlier Revolutionary War earthworks. Work proceeded despite concerns that Fort Jay's low elevation made it vulnerable to being captured. Fort Jay, a square four-bastioned fort, was made of earthworks and timber, two impermanent materials that deteriorated soon after the threat of war went away, and by 1805 it had significantly degraded. Ownership of the island was transferred to the federal government on February 15, 1800.

Lieutenant Colonel Jonathan Williams, placed in charge of New York Harbor defenses in the early 1800s, proposed several new fortifications around the harbor as part of the Second System of fortifications. Unlike the First System defenses, the new fortifications were to be made of masonry to preclude deterioration, and they included increased firepower and improved weaponry. Fort Jay was rebuilt from 1806 to 1809 in its current five-pointed star shape, and was renamed Fort Columbus shortly afterward. A second major fortification, Castle Williams, was a circular battery built between 1807 and 1811 on a rocky shoal extending from the northwest corner of the island, to the north of Fort Columbus. A third fortification, the South Battery or Half-Moon Battery (now building 298), was built to the south of Fort Columbus on the island's eastern shore in 1812. The War of 1812 commenced shortly after the completion of these defenses, though the fortifications never saw combat.

==== Mid-19th century and Civil War ====
After the War of 1812, the island did not see much development. Rather, it was used for garrisoning troops starting c. 1821. The troops garrisoned on the island were deployed to wars four times in the rest of the 19th century. The New York Arsenal, a military division that dealt with artillery and was separate from the Army, moved to the island in 1832 and started constructing an armory building three years later. Construction of structures for the Arsenal continued for several decades. To distinguish the Arsenal's and the Army's structures, the former's buildings were designed in the Greek Revival style, such as the Admiral's House built in 1843.

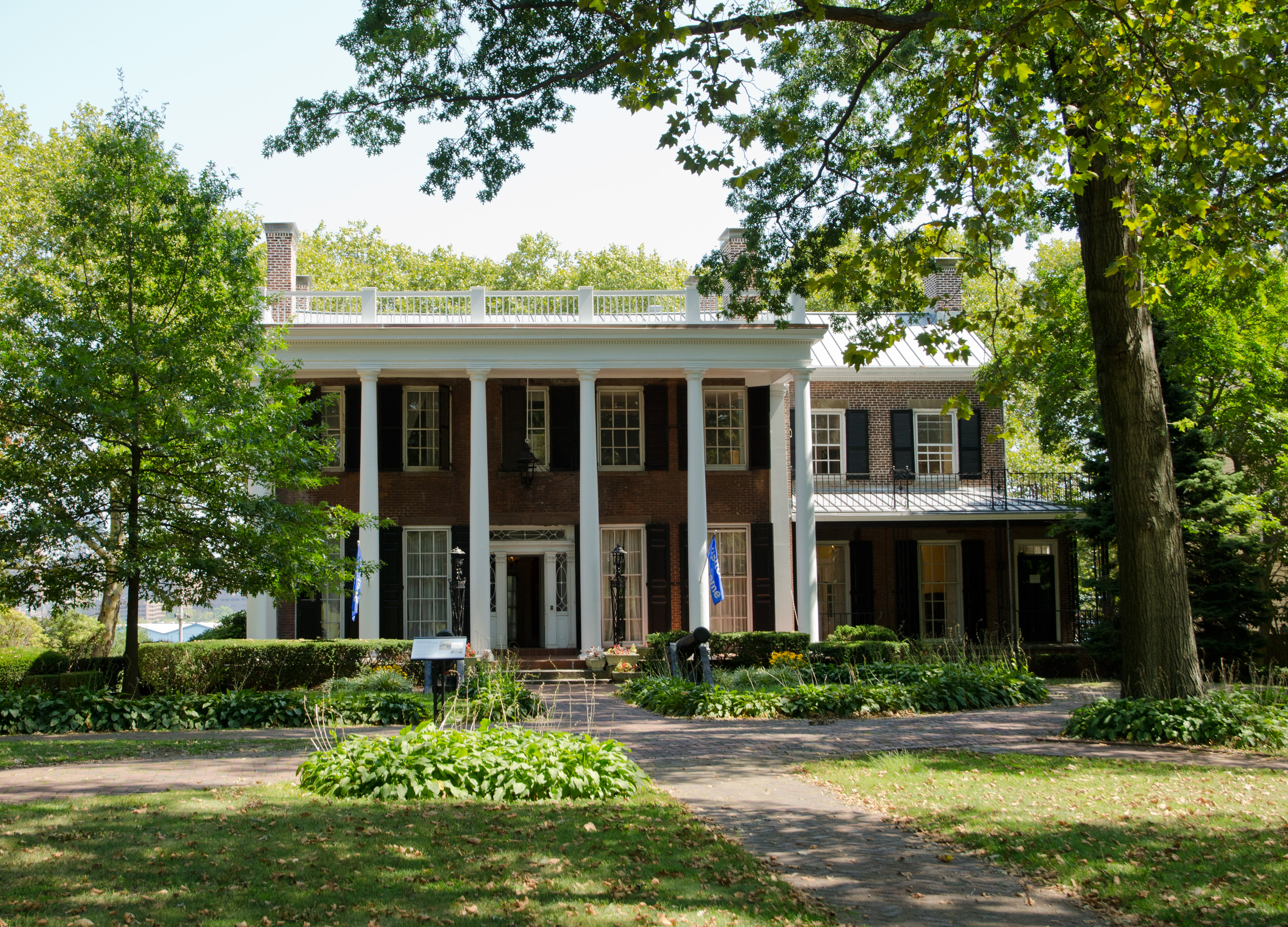
Admiral's House, completed in 1843

The Army still retained a military presence on the island, and in the 1830s, it constructed several new buildings, such as officers' barracks and a hospital. The Army also added masonry seawalls and opened an "administrative and training center" starting from the 1850s. The erection of the recruiting center and barracks resulted in the creation of Nolan Park, to the east for Fort Columbus. Together with these changes, a grassy area was cleared between Fort Columbus and Castle Williams to allow better vantage points should defensive attacks be launched. Other Army structures included a muster station that operated throughout the Mexican–American War and American Civil War, as well as a music school. Still, most of the troops continued to live in tents. To accommodate Army personnel's religious requirements, a small Gothic Revival chapel for Protestants was built on Governors Island in 1846.

No new permanent buildings were built specifically for the Civil War, though a temporary hospital was built. The hospital treated victims of cholera and yellow fever in epidemics during the 1850s and 1860s. During the war, Governors Island was used mostly as a support facility to muster soldiers, though the fortifications were still operational. Castle Williams held Confederate prisoners of war and Fort Columbus held captured Confederate officers. The austere accommodations frequently held over a thousand prisoners, and they frequently escaped and swam across to "mainland" Manhattan. In 1863, in the midst of the New York City draft riots, protesters unsuccessfully attempted to take over the island when Army troops were deployed to Manhattan.

After the war, Castle Williams was used as a military stockade and became the East Coast counterpart to military prisons at Fort Leavenworth, Kansas, and Alcatraz Island, California. Infrastructure and facilities were repaired, unused structures were destroyed, and in 1875 a new munitions warehouse was built north of Fort Columbus. Significant development occurred on the formerly undeveloped northern and eastern sides of the island: the old wood-frame barracks outside Fort Columbus were replaced, and new officers' quarters were built in Nolan Park, east of Fort Columbus. The seawalls on the north and west sides of the island were rehabilitated or extended to create additional buildable land. During this period of expansion, in 1870, a particularly severe yellow fever epidemic occurred on the island, sickening hundreds and requiring a quarantine. The structures that hosted yellow fever patients were later demolished. Despite these changes, in 1873 Fort Columbus and Castle Williams were still described as operable.

In 1878, Fort Columbus became a major Army administrative center, and Army officers' families started to move in. Other recreational options on the island were tennis courts in Nolan Park; a South Battery community garden; golf links; and a promenade for bicycling. A cemetery was also present on the island, and initially hosted yellow fever and cholera victims, but interments were halted in 1878 and all of the remains were moved to Cypress Hills Cemetery in Brooklyn by 1886. The secluded ambiance of Governors Island was altered somewhat when the first solid waste incinerator in the U.S. was built on Governors Island in 1885. Subsequent construction in the 1890s and 1900s added several officers' residences to the island. Starting in 1888, there was a movement to convert Governors Island into a public park for Lower Manhattan residents. Though park proponents argued that Central Park and Prospect Park were too far away for Lower Manhattan residents, the plan did not succeed.

=== Army operation in the 20th century ===
==== Expansion and World War I ====
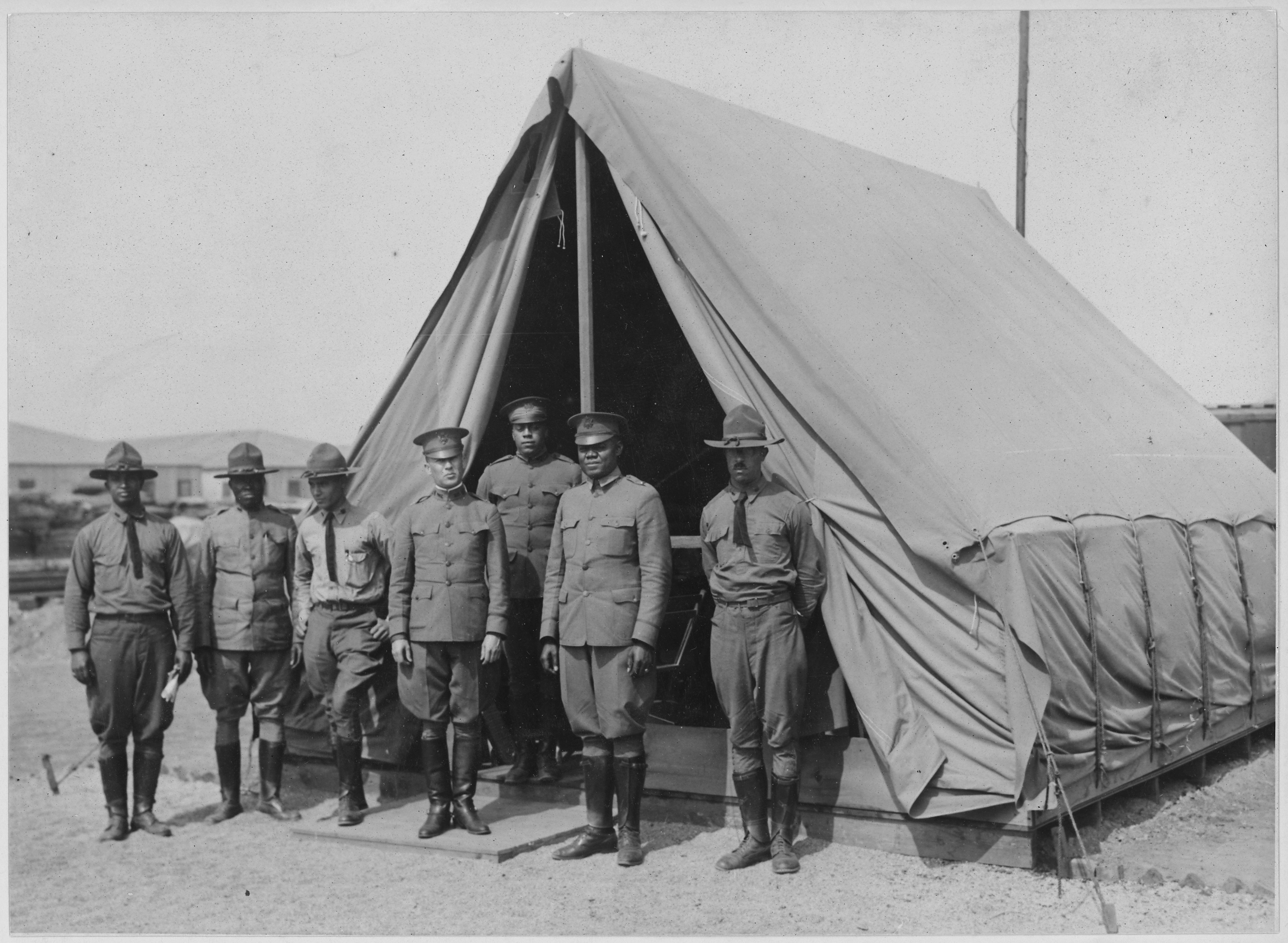
Army battalion on Governors Island, 1918

The Army started planning to expand the island in the late 1880s and the 1890s. The U.S. Secretary of War, Elihu Root, contemplated such an expansion so that the island would have enough space to accommodate a full battalion. Using material excavated from the first line of the New York City Subway, the Army Corps of Engineers added 4.787 million cubic yards (3,660,000 m^{3}) of fill, extending Governors Island to the south. The work was mostly finished by 1909-1910 and was declared complete by January 1913. When the project was finished, it expanded the island's total area by 103 acres (0.42 km^{2}), to 172 acres (0.70 km^{2}).

Secretary Root also retained the services of Beaux-Arts architect Charles Follen McKim to redesign nearly every structure on Governors Island, as well as create a plan for the island's topography. McKim presented plans in 1902 and 1907 to tear down all of the old buildings and provide for symmetrical building layouts. These plans were never executed.

In addition, Root changed Fort Columbus's name back to its historic title, Fort Jay, in 1904. The Chapel of St. Cornelius the Centurion replaced the former chapel in 1907.

The newly constructed southern part of Governors Island was initially used as an airstrip. In the world's first over-water flight in October 1909, Wilbur Wright flew from Governors Island, over the west side of Manhattan, then back to the island. The following year, Glenn Curtiss completed a flight from Albany to New York City by landing on the island. An aviation training center even operated from 1916 to 1917. In honor of these aviators, the Early Birds Monument at Liggett Hall was dedicated in 1954.

Despite the island's expansion, little development happened immediately, but significant construction occurred during World War I. Governors Island is sometimes mentioned as the location of the United States' first overt military action during the war, on April 6, 1917, when troops from the island captured German vessels in New York Harbor minutes after the U.S. Congress declared war on Germany. Barracks, tents, and temporary wooden buildings were built on the original northern portion of the island, while the new southern section housed warehouses and other ancillary facilities which collectively stored $75 million worth of material. The structures were all connected by the 8-mile (13 km) Governors Island Railroad, which consisted of numerous sidings for shunting. The railroad had been reduced to 1.5 miles (2.4 km) and was dubbed the "World's Shortest Railroad" by the time it was torn up in 1931. A buried railroad truck was dug up on the island in 2014, possibly the remains of a handcar.

==== Mid-20th century ====
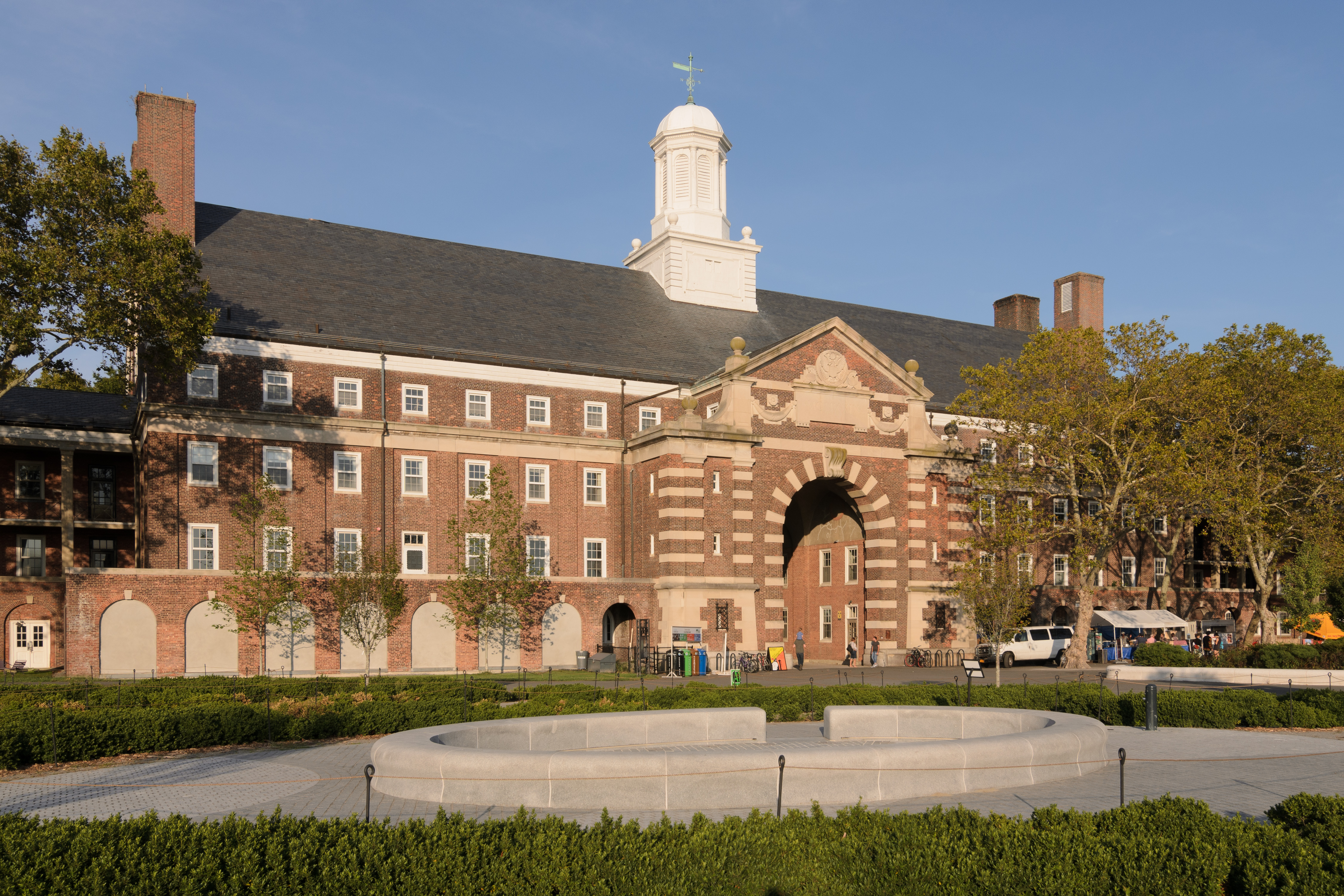
Liggett Hall or Building 400 (1928), former barracks

In 1920, upon the end of World War I, the Army restructured its internal organization so that Governors Island was now the headquarters of the Second Corps Area. Few structures were built immediately after the end of the war, though the Army maintained the existing buildings and continued to utilize the island as a military prison. Some of the wooden barracks structures deteriorated rapidly, prompting objections from congressional delegations. A school for Army soldiers' children was opened on Governors Island in 1926.

In 1927, General Hanson Edward Ely commenced a major program to build several mostly Georgian revival structures on Governors Island. The new structures included a movie theater, a YMCA, an "officer's club", and a public school. The three-story Liggett Hall (also known as Building 400), a military barracks spanning nearly the entire width of the original island, was built on the site of former World War I warehouses, and was one of the world's largest barracks upon its completion in 1928. Afterward, the Army hired McKim, Mead & White to build a "barracks district" near Liggett Hall. During the 1930s, the Works Progress Administration landscaped much of the island and reinforced many existing structures, hiring up to 5,000 workers in the process. Some of the WPA's projects included the restoration of the General's House, as well as the eradication of invasive Japanese beetles. The Army also incrementally repaved Governors Island's roads so they could accommodate modern vehicles, and constructed garages.

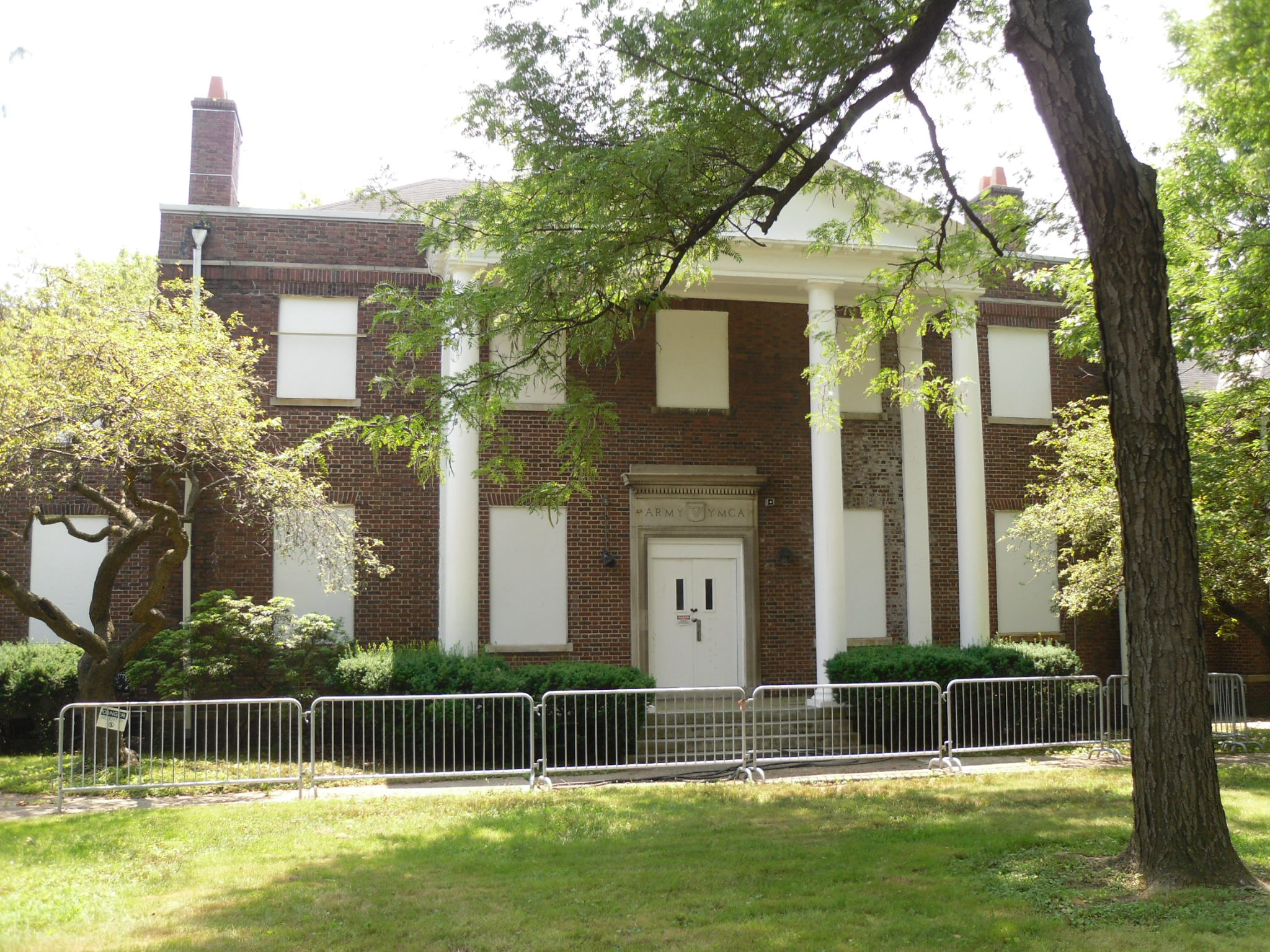
The Army YMCA

An Army community developed on Governors Island during the mid-20th century. The island had three chapels in addition to the movie theater, YMCA, and "officer's club". Recreation was also popular; one common sport was polo, a relic from the 19th century when travel on the island was by horseback. In 1920, a polo playing field was established on the island's Parade Ground. Though a golf course had been built in 1903 near Fort Jay, a new polo-and-golf course called the Governors Island Golf Course was built circa 1925–1926. The course was located on the grounds of Fort Jay, and was sometimes called the "world's crookedest" golf course due to its enclosed nature in a confined space. Tennis courts and swimming pools were also present on Governors Island. Different groupings of recreational areas were generally located according to military hierarchy. The number of houses of worship increased as a Roman Catholic church was built in 1942, followed by a synagogue in 1959.

World War II resulted in another hierarchical change on Governors Island, turning it into an administrative center. In 1939, the island became the headquarters of the U.S. First Army, and two years later the Eastern Defense Command was also established on the island. In conjunction, 72 temporary structures were erected on the island. Governors Island became a U.S. Army recruitment center in 1941, and was processing 1,500 recruits daily by 1942. This volume proved to be overwhelming due to the island's isolation. In October 1942 the recruitment station was moved to Grand Central Palace, near Grand Central Terminal. Following the end of World War II in 1945, Governors Island continued to be the U.S. First Army's headquarters, and few substantive changes were made. Some buildings were razed in the southwest corner of the island, and an administrative office was destroyed to make way for a parking lot, but overall the building layout remained relatively untouched.

==== Infrastructure ====
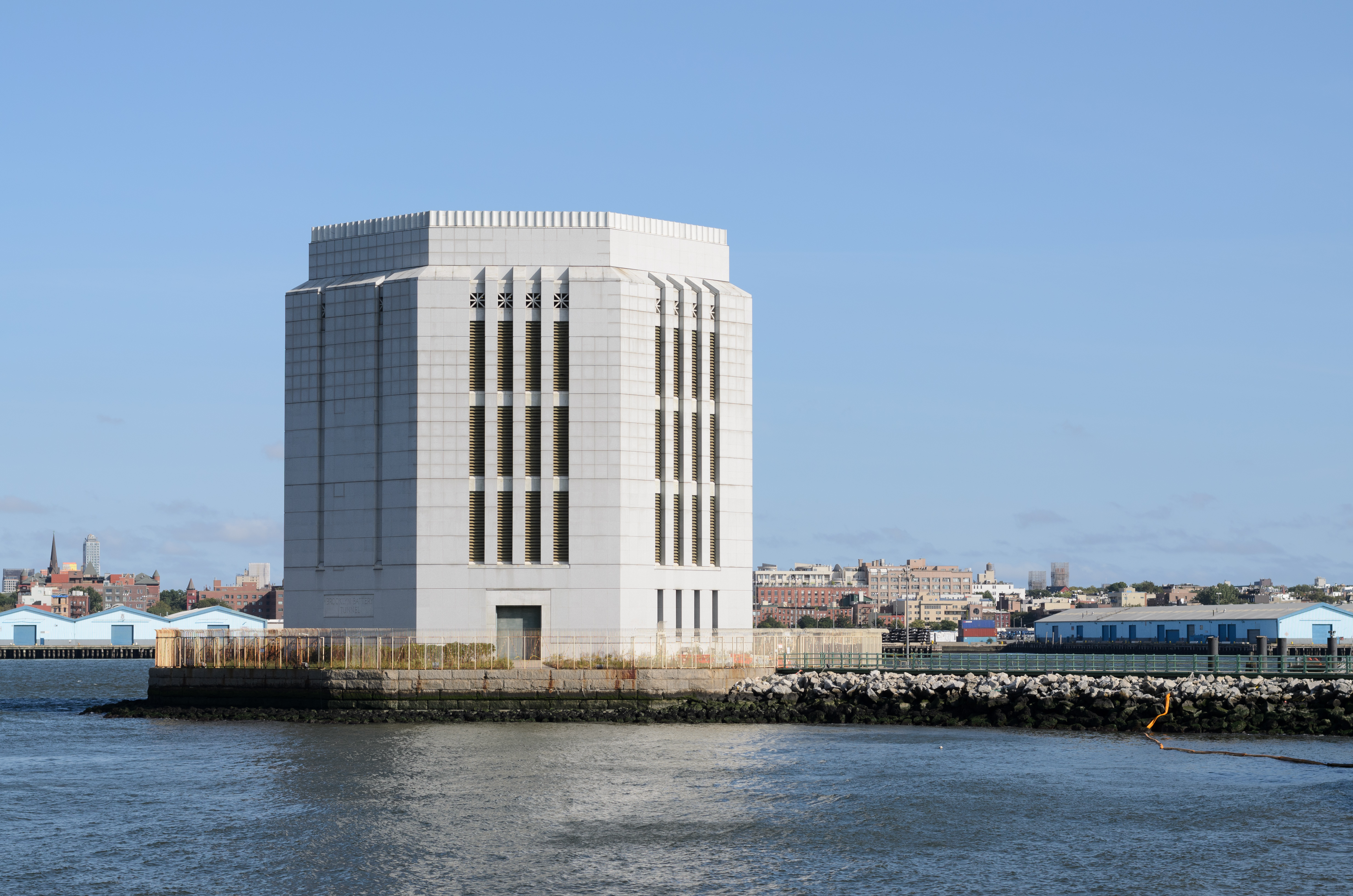
Brooklyn–Battery Tunnel ventilation tower off Governors Island

Prior to the construction of Floyd Bennett Field in Brooklyn in 1930, the island was considered as a site for a municipal airport. In 1927, U.S. Representative and future New York City mayor Fiorello La Guardia advocated for a commercial airport to be placed in Governors Island, since it was closer to Manhattan than the proposed site of Floyd Bennett Field. A bill in the U.S. House to create a Governors Island airport was voted down. The island also hosted the Governors Island Army Airfield for some time after World War II until the 1960s.

In 1940, work started on the Brooklyn–Battery Tunnel, which passes underwater offshore of the island's northeast corner. A ventilation building designed by McKim, Mead & White is connected to the island by a causeway. Initially, Triborough Bridge and Tunnel Authority chairman Robert Moses had proposed a bridge across the harbor, but the War Department quashed the plan, calling it a possible navigational threat to the Brooklyn Navy Yard located upriver. A subsequent plan to build a ramp from Governors Island to the bridge was rejected as well. The Brooklyn–Battery Tunnel opened to traffic in 1950 without any other physical connection to the island.

==== Decommissioning ====
In 1963, Department of Defense Secretary Robert S. McNamara started studying the feasibility of closing redundant military installations, especially naval ship yards, in order to save money. The Department of Defense announced in May 1964 that it was considering closing Fort Jay, the Brooklyn Navy Yard, and the Brooklyn Army Terminal. Despite protests from workers at the three facilities, McNamara announced that November that Fort Jay would be one of nearly a hundred military installations that would be closed. In February 1965, the United States Coast Guard announced that it had asked for permission to move to Fort Jay in order to consolidate its facilities within New York City. The Coast Guard saw the island as an opportunity to consolidate and provide more facilities for its schools, and as a base for its regional and Atlantic Ocean operations.

=== Coast Guard operation ===
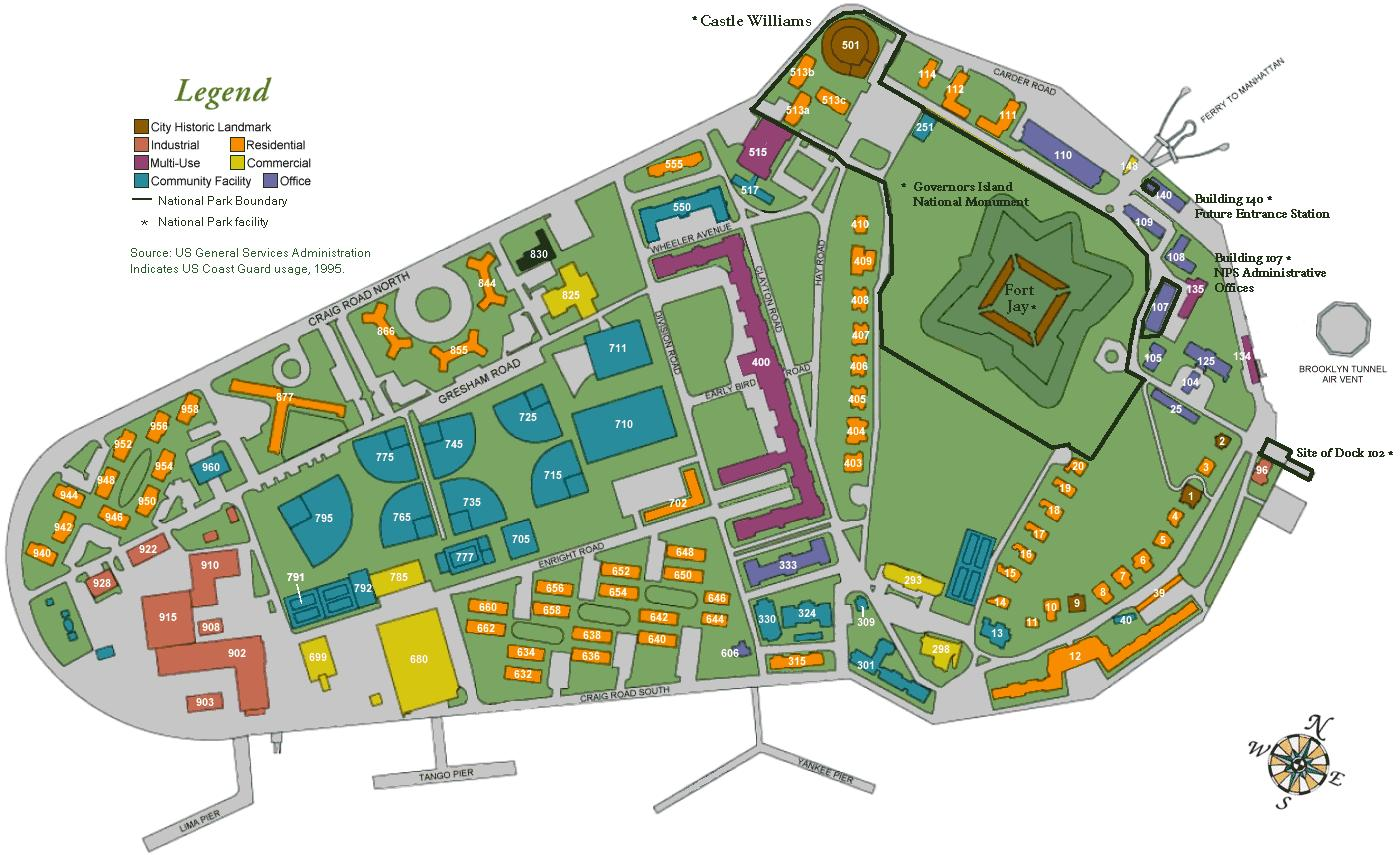
Map showing Coast Guard usage of Governors Island in 1995

On December 31, 1965, the Army base was formally decommissioned and the installation became a Coast Guard base. At that point, most of the World War II-era buildings on the island's southern tip were still standing. The Coast Guard consolidated its operations at Governors Island, making the island the Coast Guard's largest installation. The island was used as a base of operations for the Atlantic Area Command and its regional Third District command. By 1985, the island had a population of 4,000 personnel and 1,000 family members. It was also homeport for U.S. Coast Guard cutters, including USCGC Gallatin (WHEC-721), USCGC Morgenthau (WHEC-722), and USCGC Dallas (WHEC-716).

The Coast Guard split the island's operations among seven divisions, and began making various improvements such as adding a boat marina and the world's first search-and-rescue training school. By 1972, the Coast Guard had opened some apartment blocks on the southern portion of Governors Island, which replaced the temporary World War II-era buildings on that site. The golf course and open space in the center of the island were preserved during this wave of development. Liggett Hall was converted to classrooms, and other historic structures were preserved and restored. A community of Coast Guard members began to develop on the island, and it came to include a fire and police department, banks, stores, churches, an elementary school, a movie theater, a motel, a bowling alley, and a Burger King fast-food restaurant.

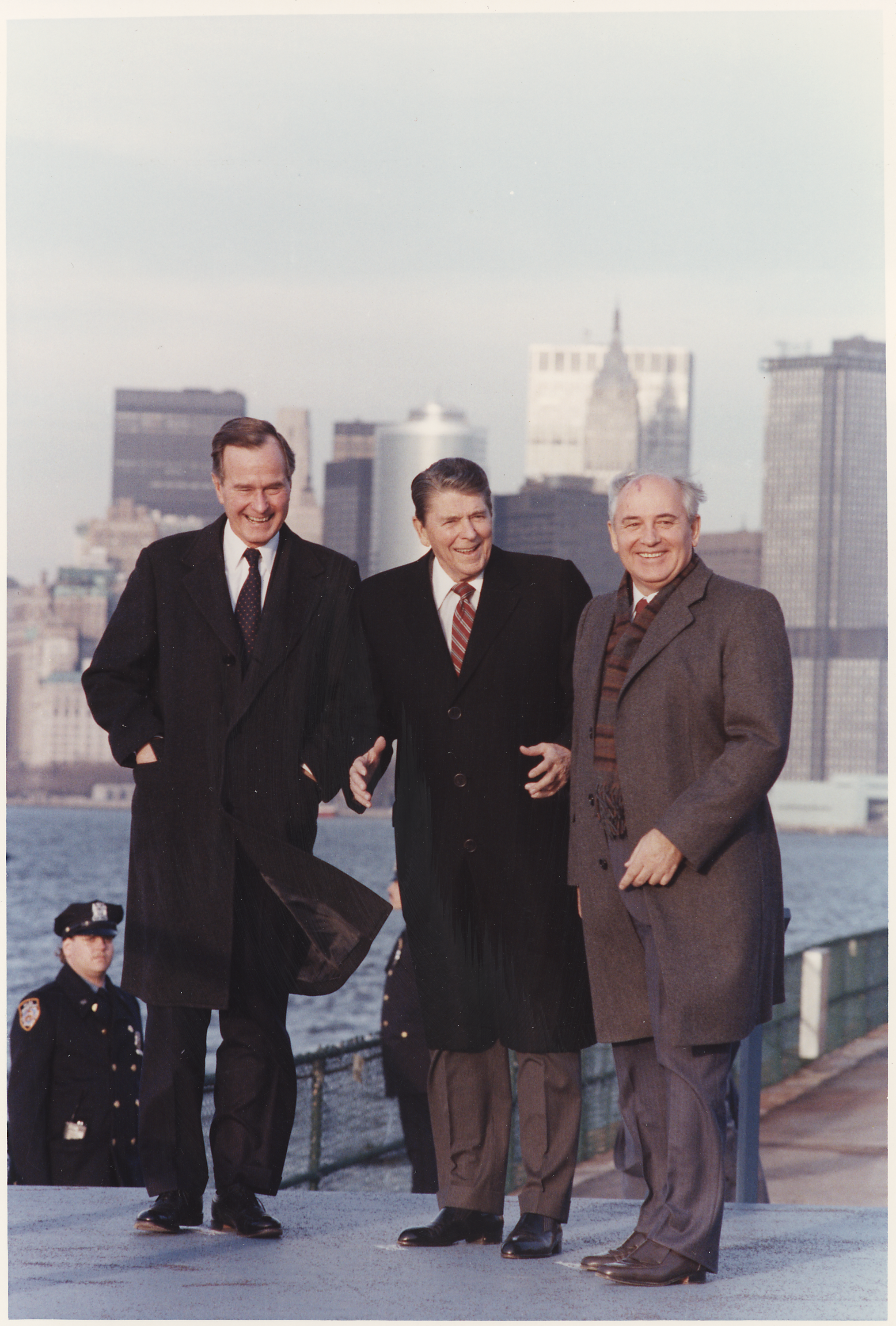
President Ronald Reagan and President-elect George Bush meet with Soviet leader Mikhail Gorbachev in December 1988

During this time, several notable events took place at Governors Island. During Liberty Weekend in 1986, President Ronald Reagan traveled to the island for a ceremony to relight the Statue of Liberty upon completion of the statue's restoration. On December 8, 1988, Reagan and President-elect George Bush met with Soviet leader Mikhail Gorbachev on the island, in Reagan's last U.S.-Soviet summit as president. In July 1993, the United Nations held discussions between Haitian political leaders at the South Battery, which resulted in the Governors Island Accord being signed. The Coast Guard era also coincided with two landmark designations. On February 4, 1985, a 92-acre (370,000 m^{2}) portion of Governors Island was designated a National Historic Landmark. The New York City Landmarks Preservation Commission created the Governors Island Historic District on June 18, 1996.

The United States Department of Transportation, the parent of the Coast Guard, identified the Governors Island base for closure in 1995. The move was part of a series of Coast Guard base closures that would collectively save $100 million a year. Governors Island alone cost $60 million a year to maintain. By 1996, the Coast Guard had relocated all functions and residential personnel to offices and bases, but left a caretaker detachment to jointly maintain the island with the General Services Administration (GSA) while its future was determined. Other federal agencies were loath to take control of the island. Upon the announcement of the base's closure in 1995, President Bill Clinton offered to give up the island for $1 if Mayor Rudy Giuliani and Governor George Pataki could agree to reserve the island for public use. The city was initially reluctant to take up Clinton's offer because it would not have been financially beneficial to the city. The issue was exacerbated when the Balanced Budget Act was passed in 1997, stipulating that the GSA sell the island at a fair market value by 2002. The island's sale was expected to net the federal government $500 million.

=== Redevelopment ===
==== Early proposals ====
With the announcement of the Coast Guard base's closure, officials and developers began offering plans for development. Mayor Giuliani considered building a casino and hotel on Governors Island. Other plans entailed preserving the island as a museum; converting it into a public park; establishing a free-trade zone; and building an educational campus, a prison, an amusement park, a golf courses, or even a nightclub district. In 1996, the Van Alen Institute hosted an ideas competition called "Public Property", attracting over 200 submissions. An agreement between the city and state to maintain the island for public use was reached in 2000. Throughout this time, the federal government continued to maintain the island for $20 million a year.

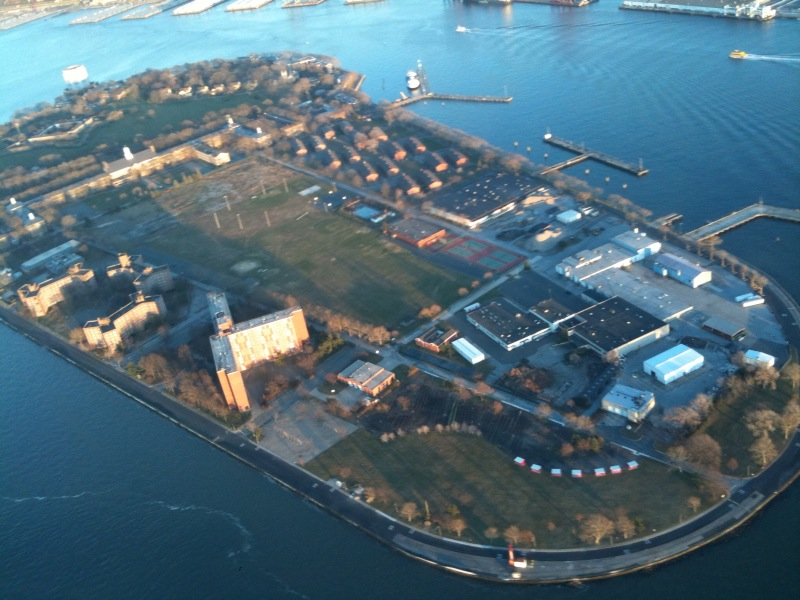
Aerial view in 2009 facing northeast

In a last-minute act while in office, President Clinton designated a 22-acre (8.9 ha) area, including Fort Jay and Castle Williams, as Governors Island National Monument on January 19, 2001. The monument would be administered by the National Park Service. The following year, it was announced that Governors Island would become public property, though the transfer of the island was delayed due to the 2002 New York gubernatorial election. On January 31, 2003, the rest of the island's 150 acres, as well as 32 acres (13 ha) of underwater land, were sold for a "nominal sum" (reported to be $1) and placed under the management of a joint city-state agency, the Governors Island Preservation and Education Corporation (GIPEC). The transfer included deed restrictions which prohibit permanent housing or casinos on the island. The agreements also stipulated that 40 acres (16 ha) of land had to be used as parkland, and another 50 acres (20 ha) had to be used for "educational, civic or cultural" purposes. In practice, the deed restriction precludes most long-term development on Governors Island.

Progress on redevelopment was slow, but in early 2006, Governor George Pataki and Mayor Michael Bloomberg launched a competition for ideas to preserve Governors Island. During this period, the National Park Service and GIPEC began conducting restorations on parts of Governors Island. Major construction was necessary to convert the island for public use, such as repairs to the seawall and removal of asbestos. By 2006, the GIPEC had awarded leases to its first two tenants. The public was first allowed to visit the island in 2005, and eight thousand visitors came that year. At first, Governors Island was only open during summer weekends, except for a few concerts. Bikes and ferry services were made free in order to attract visitors. Art exhibits were later added.

==== Phase 1 and 2 renovations ====
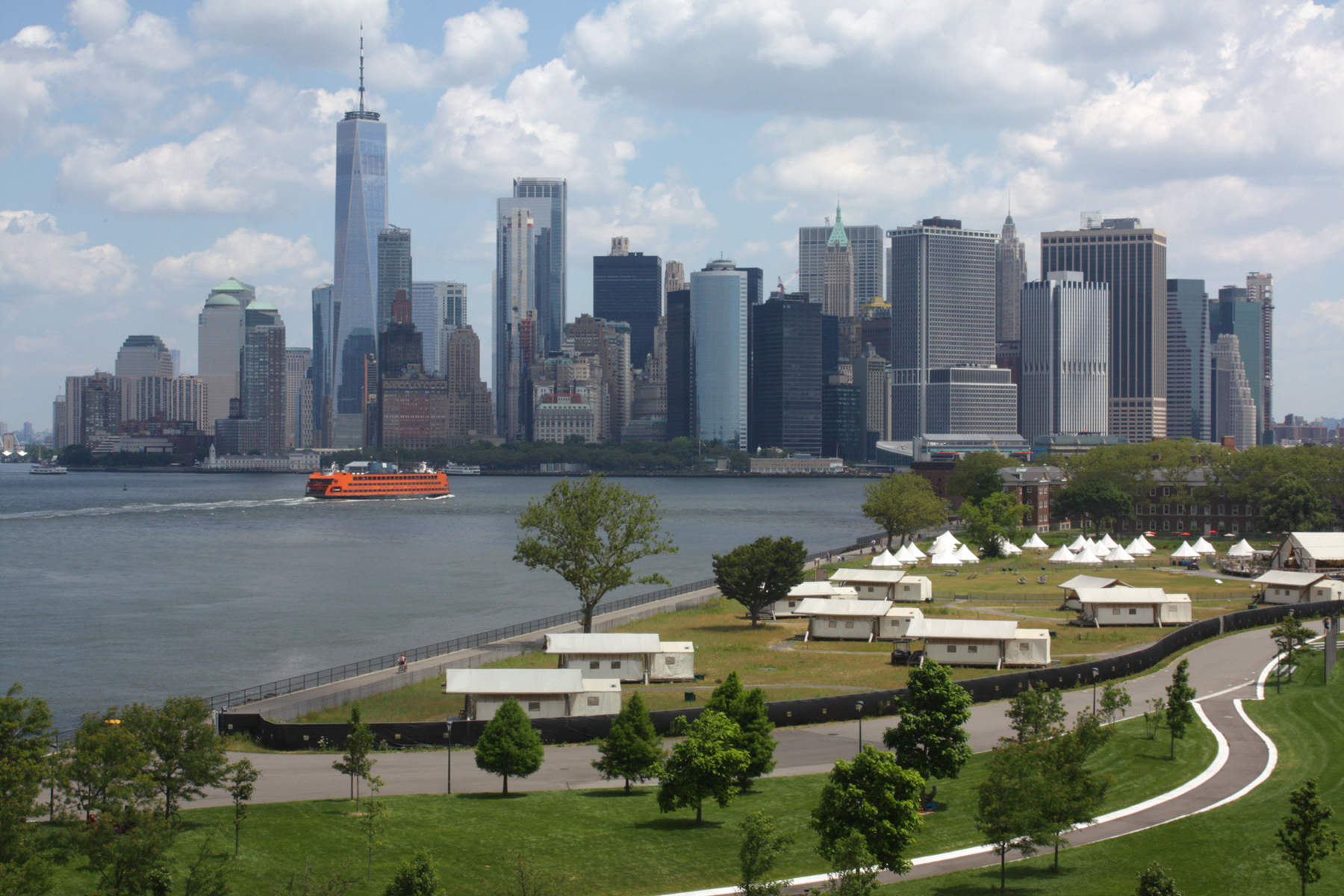
Lower Manhattan from Outlook Hill's summit, the tallest artificial hill on the island; open space, bike paths and a Staten Island Ferry boat are visible

In mid-2007, GIPEC announced five finalist design teams, namely West 8, Diller Scofidio + Renfro, Rogers Marvel Architects, Quennell Rothschild & Partners, and SMWM. West 8 ultimately won the contest. The plan included 87 acres (35 ha) of open space, as well as provided for the restoration of the historic district and a new park on the island's southern portion. Artificial hills were part of West 8's plan for the island, as were free bicycle rentals. Since the island was windy, West 8 designed their proposed topography to provide moments of shelter. Some plans were not implemented; these included an aerial gondola system designed by Santiago Calatrava, as well as a proposal by Center for Urban Real Estate (CURE) at Columbia University to physically connect Manhattan to Governors Island using landfill. A proposal to convert Castle Williams into a theater in the style of London's Globe Theatre was designed by architect Norman Foster in 2005, but was deemed unsuitable for the castle's design. Additionally, in 2008, there were unrealized plans to relocate the security and ticketing checkpoints for the Liberty Island and Ellis Island tourist ferries from the Battery to Governors Island, bringing as many as 500,000 additional people to Governors Island each year.

The number of tenants on Governors Island started to increase, though they numbered fewer than 1,000 as of 2014. In 2009, a 3-acre (12,000 m^{2}) commercial organic farm, operated by the non-profit organization Added Value, was launched. In 2010, the Urban Assembly New York Harbor School relocated from Bushwick, Brooklyn, to building 550 on Governors Island. Also opened that year were artist studios run by the Lower Manhattan Cultural Council and housed in a portion of Building 110. Demolition of old structures on Governors Island began in 2008 with the destruction of a derelict motel. In April 2010, the city took control of the island's development, and GIPEC was succeeded by the Trust for Governors Island. The city also unveiled a new master development plan that preserved the historic north end of Governors Island, developed the middle and southern portions of the island as a park, and reserved the western and eastern sections for private development. The administration of Mayor Michael Bloomberg had provided funding for the first phase of construction. Construction on the $260 million park started May 24, 2012, and the Coast Guard-era military housing complexes were demolished.

As part of phase 1 of the master plan, Soissons Landing was upgraded with new ferry docks and a waiting plaza, while the Parade Ground was regraded for lawn sports, while the Historic District gained concessions. In 2013, construction started on a new potable water connection (which replaced a locally illegal connection from the Brooklyn-Battery Tunnel) as well as repairs to the seawall. The 6-acre (2.4 ha) Liggett Terrace courtyard was built in 2014, as was Hammock Grove and a new play structure. The Oyster Pavilion opened in June 2015, followed by the 10-acre (4.0 ha) Hills section of the park in July 2016. The island became more popular over the years. While it attracted 275,000 visitors in 2009, over 800,000 people came to the island in 2018.

==== Mid-2010s to present ====
In September 2016, the Trust for Governors Island and the New York City Economic Development Corporation started an online survey to develop ideas for Governors Island as a year-round destination. Two years later, mayor Bill de Blasio opened a formal process to rezone the remaining un-redeveloped portions of Governors Island for dormitory, office, or educational use. The proposed rezoning drew opposition from activists who wanted Governors Island to be kept largely as-is. Also in 2018, the city's government held the NYCx Governors Island Connectivity Challenge, asking three companies to test out 5G technology on Governors Island; if the project was successful, the city's government would pursue a wider rollout of 5G in New York City.

The Lower Manhattan Cultural Council's expanded Arts Center at Governors Island opened in September 2019 in a renovated former ordnance warehouse at the north end of the island. The new Arts Center features gallery, exhibition, and performance space as well as studio areas for up to 40 artists. The opening of the Arts Center added LMCC to the island's community of year-round tenants, which also includes Billion Oyster Project, an organization to restore New York Harbor's oyster population and biodiversity; the Urban Assembly New York Harbor School, a high school focused on maritime vocational education; and QC NY, a destination day spa. In October 2019, city officials proposed constructing a climate change research center on the island. In March 2020, the Trust for Governors Island issued a Request for Proposals seeking arts and culture organizations to become year-round tenants in two historic buildings in Nolan Park. During 2020, as a result of the COVID-19 pandemic in New York City, the island opened two months later than usual, and a timed ticketing system limited daily visitation to 5,000.

In September 2021, mayor Bill de Blasio announced that the island would operate year-round rather than from May through October. Though there were no full-time residents at the time, the Trust for Governors Island started expanding nighttime access to the island following the announcement. Additionally, two organizations announced plans to host about a dozen residents by 2022. The QC NY spa opened inside a former barracks on the north side of the island in March 2022, and the Gitano Island beach club opened that July. In April 2023, the Trust for Governors Island selected Stony Brook University to construct a 400,000-square-foot (37,000 m^{2}) climate research lab on the island, which was planned to cost $700 million and be complete in 2028. The Trust announced plans in 2024 to convert Building 140 into a restaurant and event space, and the New York Harbor School began an expansion that year.

== Geography ==
Governors Island comprises 172 acres (70 ha) of land. About 22 acres (9 ha) are operated by the National Park Service while the rest are under the jurisdiction of The Trust for Governors Island. The island is about 400 yd (370 m) west of Brooklyn and 800 yd (730 m) south of Manhattan. Politically it is part of the borough of Manhattan, and shares the ZIP Code 10004 with the blocks around South Ferry in Manhattan. Governors Island contains several named streets, mostly in the northern part of the island. The entirety of the island is surrounded by a waterfront promenade.

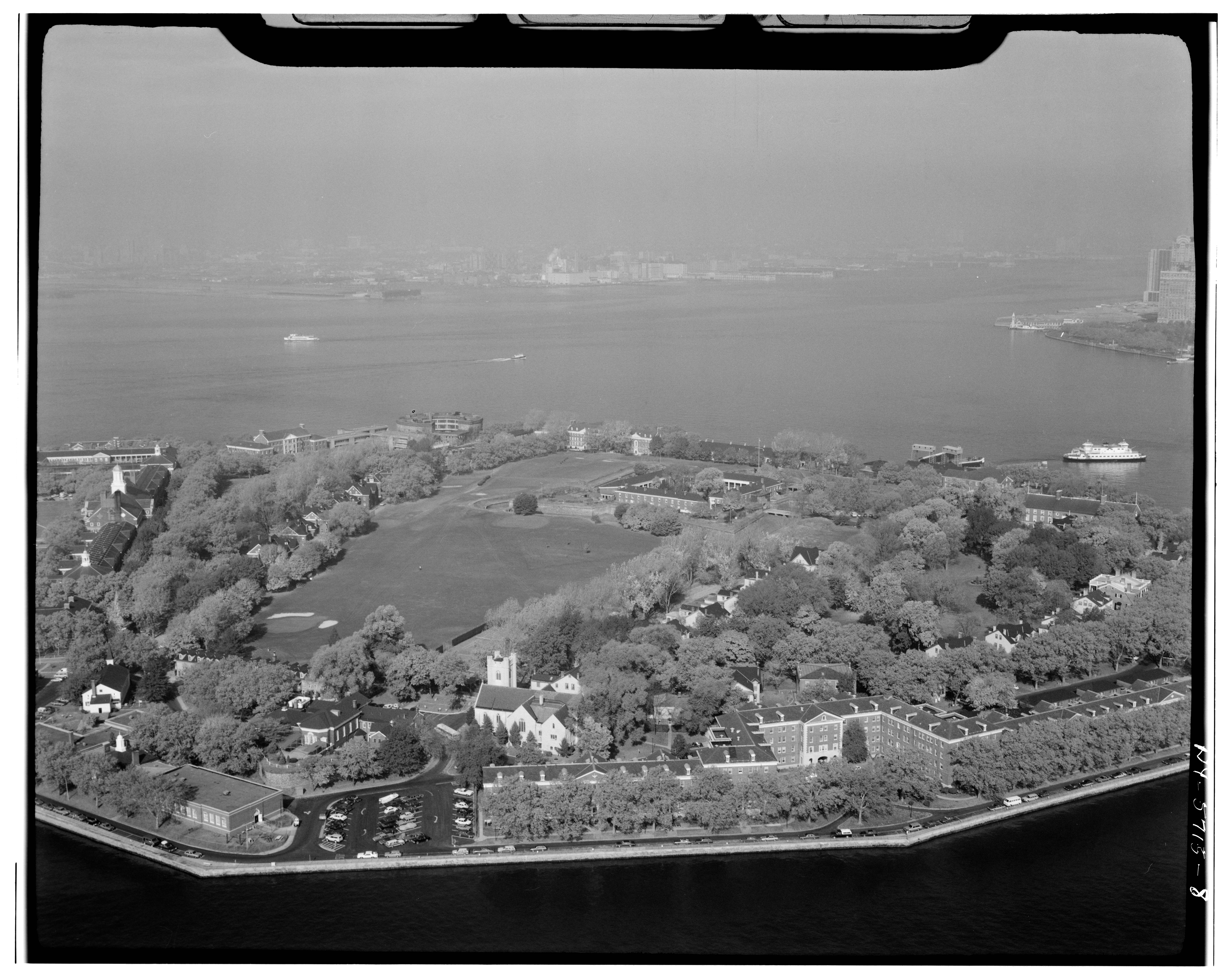
Aerial view of the original island

Governors Island's shape is roughly characterized as resembling an ice cream cone. The 69-acre (28 ha) northern part of the island is original and can be described as the "ice cream", while the artificial 103-acre (42 ha) southern section can be described as the "cone". Functionally, the island is bisected by Division Road and Liggett Hall, which separate the NPS-operated northern section from the parkland in the southern section.

The highest natural point on Governors Island is 40 feet (12 m) above mean water level at the base of Fort Jay, in the northern portion of the island. The southern section formerly was lowland and was located no more than 13.5 feet (4.1 m) above mean sea level, but, since the construction of the new parkland in the 2010s, has contained the Hills, which range from 26 to 70 feet (7.9 to 21.3 m) high. This construction, part of the island's Park and Public Space Master Plan, included various measures to make the island more resilient against the effects of climate change, like raising much of the south island out of the 100-year flood plain, and replacing the old sea wall with a layer of riprap to better mitigate wave action. A 2023 study found that Governors Island was sinking at a rate of about 3.4 ± 0.8 millimeters (0.134 ± 0.031 in) per year, making it among the fastest-sinking locations in New York City. This is mainly because the southern part of the island was created through land reclamation.

== Notable structures ==
=== Fortifications ===
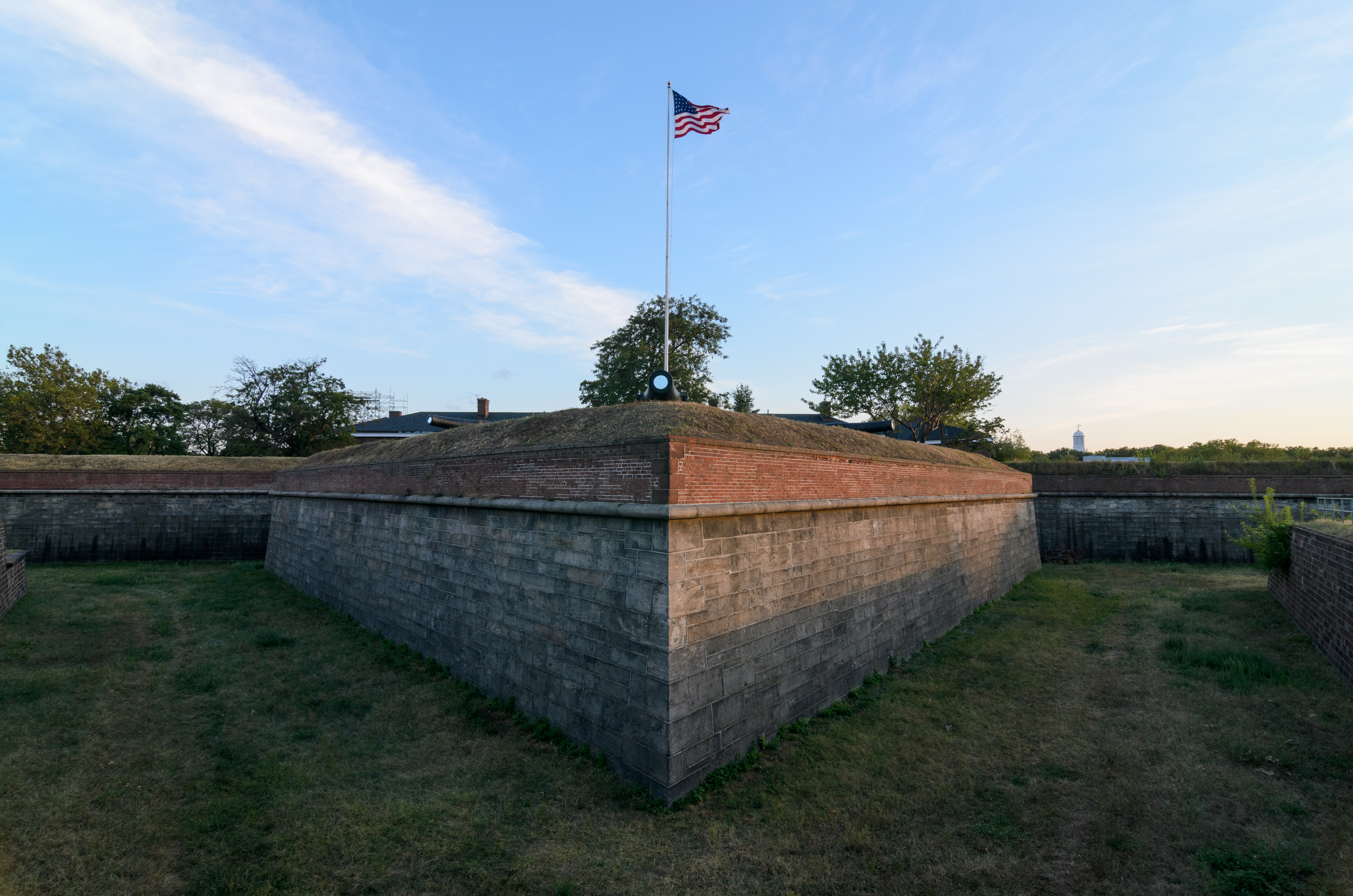
Fort Jay

Several fortifications were built on Governors Island to protect New York Harbor. These worked in conjunction with Castle Clinton at the southern tip of Manhattan, as well as Fort Wood on Liberty Island, and Fort Gibson on Ellis Island. The existing fortifications were meant to protect the city during the War of 1812.

Fort Jay, located at the center of the original (northern) portion of Governors Island, is the oldest, having been built in 1794. It was built on the highest point of the island, with a glacis sloping down from all sides. The initial fortifications degraded to such a point that they were replaced in 1806. Fort Jay was initially named for New York governor John Jay, but after being rebuilt, was known as Fort Columbus until about 1904. The rebuilt fort, which reused the original glacis and many of the original walls, comprised "an enclosed pentagonal work, with four bastions of masonry, calculated for one hundred guns", and initially included a 230-person brick barracks. Though Fort Jay has been renovated multiple times throughout its history, its current appearance largely stems from renovations in the 1830s. The walls of Fort Jay are made of sandstone and granite, with an arrow-shaped ravelin on the northern wall. The fortification is surrounded by a moat that is now dry.

Castle Williams was built from 1807 through 1811 on the northwestern corner of the island, on what was then a submerged rock. Named for USACE chief engineer Jonathan Williams, it is a cylindrical four-tiered sandstone building measuring 40 feet (12 m) high by 210 feet (64 m) in diameter. The walls taper from 8 to 7 feet (2.4 to 2.1 m) from bottom to top. The building is four-tiered, with 13 casemates on each tier each having a capacity of two cannons, for a total capacity of 104 cannons. Two structures inside the southern side of the fort were removed in 1900.

A third structure, called the South Battery or Half-Moon Battery, is located at the southeast corner of the original island near Buttermilk Channel, and was built before the War of 1812. The arrowhead-shaped South Battery contained 13 barbette guns, mounted on the parapet and facing Buttermilk Channel, as well as a barracks inside. It was then used as an officer's mess and Catholic chapel by 1878; as a court-martial room by the 1880s; and as an amusement hall after a 1904 renovation. From the 1930s, South Battery was also used as an officers' club.

=== Open landscapes ===
==== Northern portion ====
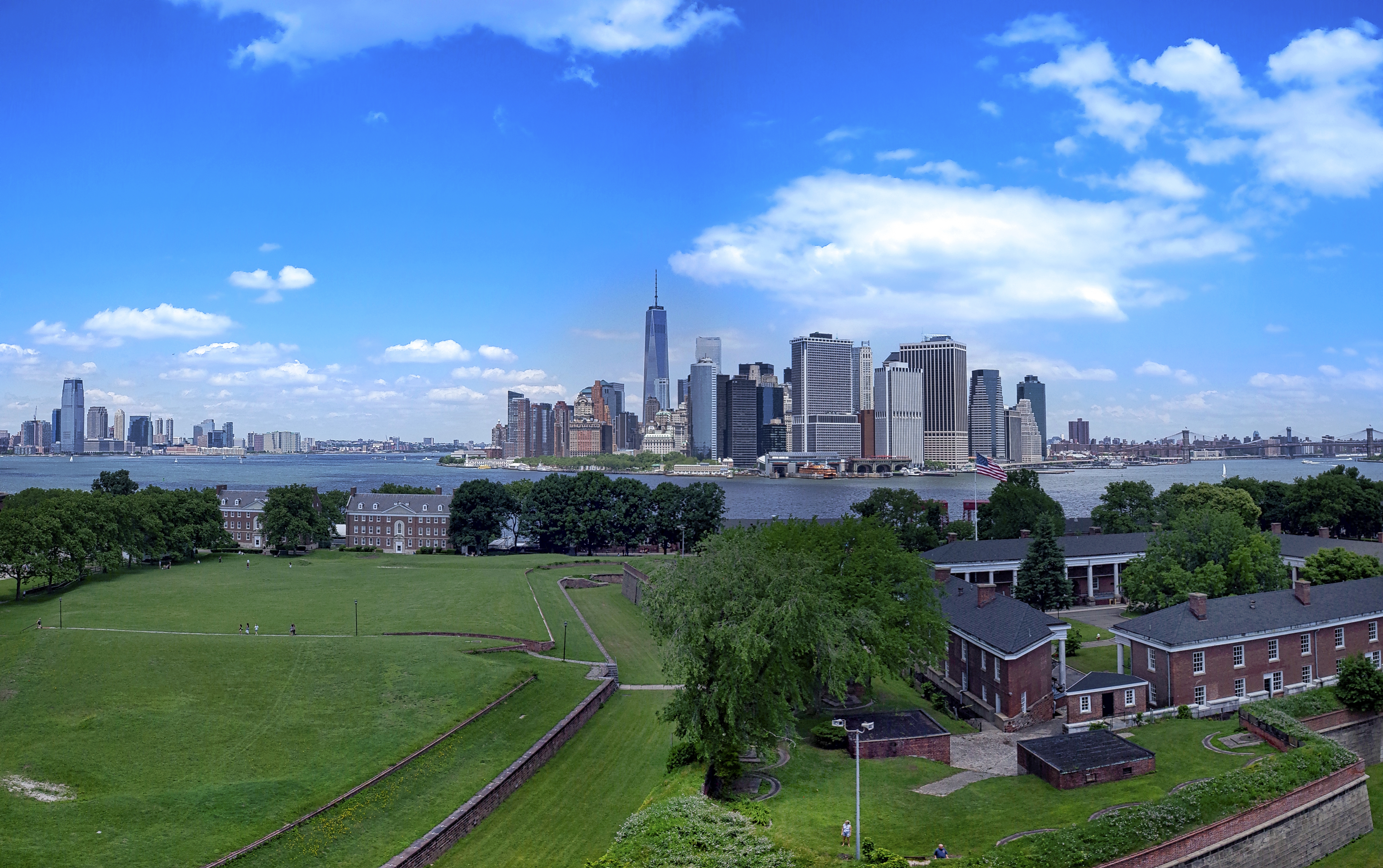
Fort Jay's glacis (left) and barracks (right), looking toward Manhattan

There are four open landscapes in the historic northern part of Governors Island. The northernmost is the glacis of Fort Jay, a treeless grassy area that slopes down from all sides of the fort. The glacis formed a buffer between the walls of Fort Jay and the moat at the bottom of the slope. The glacis contained a polo field, as well as the Governors Island Golf Course.

To the southeast of Fort Jay is Nolan Park, a formal trapezoidal area with tree-lined walks that is surrounded by former officers' quarters and administrative buildings. The park's eastern border curves southwest toward the southern end of the area, while the western and northern borders are roughly perpendicular to each other. Nolan Park's current configuration dates to the 1870s, and it was named after Major General Dennis E. Nolan, who was First Army's commander from 1933 to 1936. A bandstand formerly existed on the site.

Governors Island's Parade Ground is located directly west of Nolan Park and south of Fort Jay, and is about 13 acres (5.3 ha). The parade ground slopes downward, away from Fort Jay and toward the waterfront to the south. It was used as both a military training ground and as an execution site for prisoners stockaded at Castle Williams. The golf course formerly extended into the parade ground, though remnants of the golf course still exist. Near the Parade Ground, overlooking Buttermilk Channel, is New York City's only lavender field.

The fourth open landscape is the triangle between Clayton and Hay Roads, also known as Colonels Row Green or Hay Park, located southwest of Fort Jay and northeast of Liggett Hall. It was created in the early 20th century and forms a wedge shape between Hay Road to the east, which forms the island's original southwest shoreline, and Clayton Road and Liggett Hall to the southwest.

==== Southern portion ====
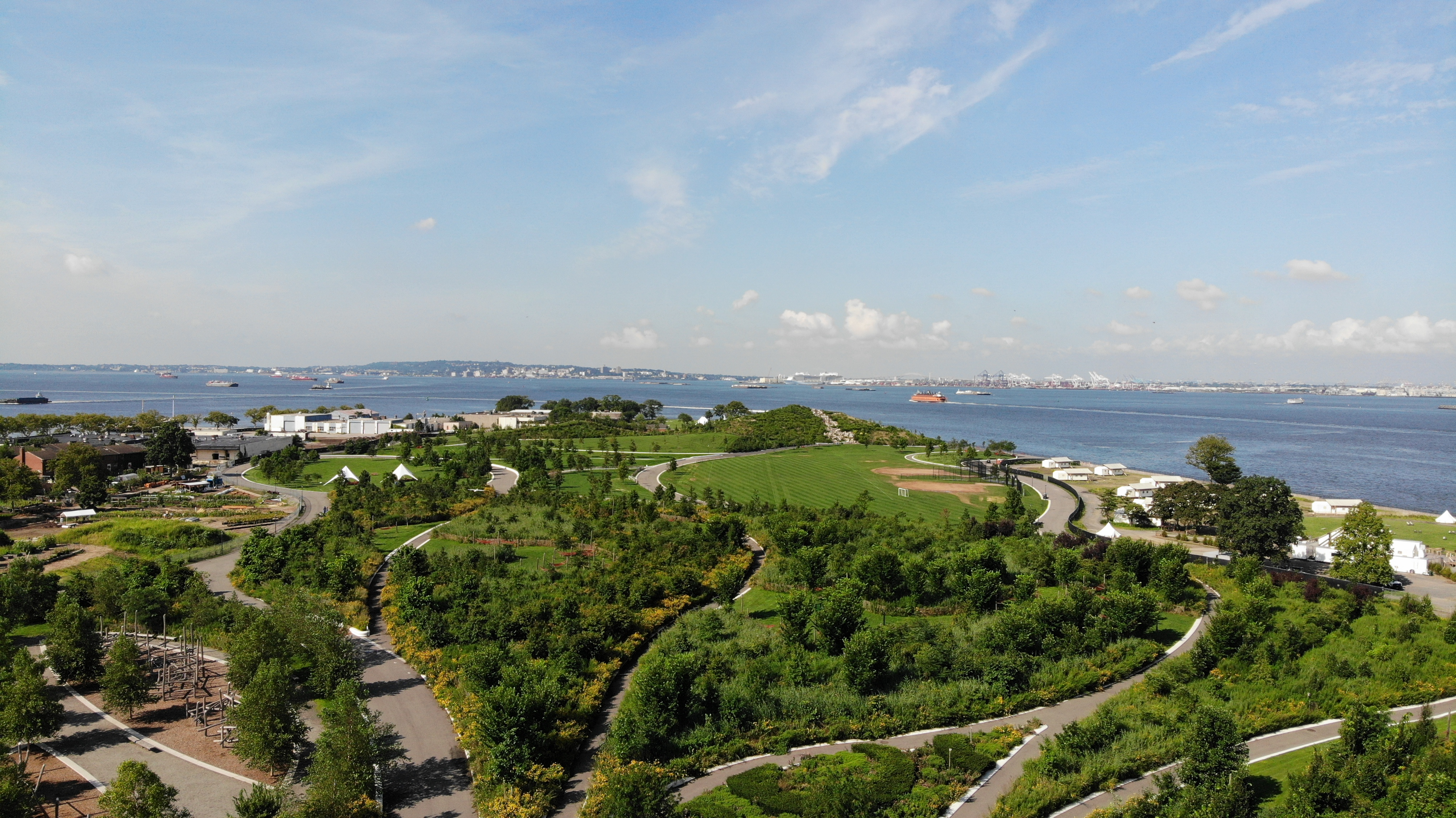
Governors Island's southern half including new parkland

The southern portion of Governors Island includes a park that covers more than 43 acres (17 ha). The north end of the park contains Hammock Grove, a landscaped area of rolling hills with over 60 tree species. The grove's hills are located up to 27 feet (8.2 m) above mean sea level, preventing it from flooding. The grove itself is 10 acres (4.0 ha) and contains 50 hammocks. Immediately to the west is the 14-acre (5.7 ha) Play Lawn, which contains two turf fields that can be used for baseball. The paths in this portion of Governors Island are meandering, in a style similar to Frederick Law Olmsted's designs of Central Park and Prospect Park, which incorporate winding paths to reinforce a secluded atmosphere.

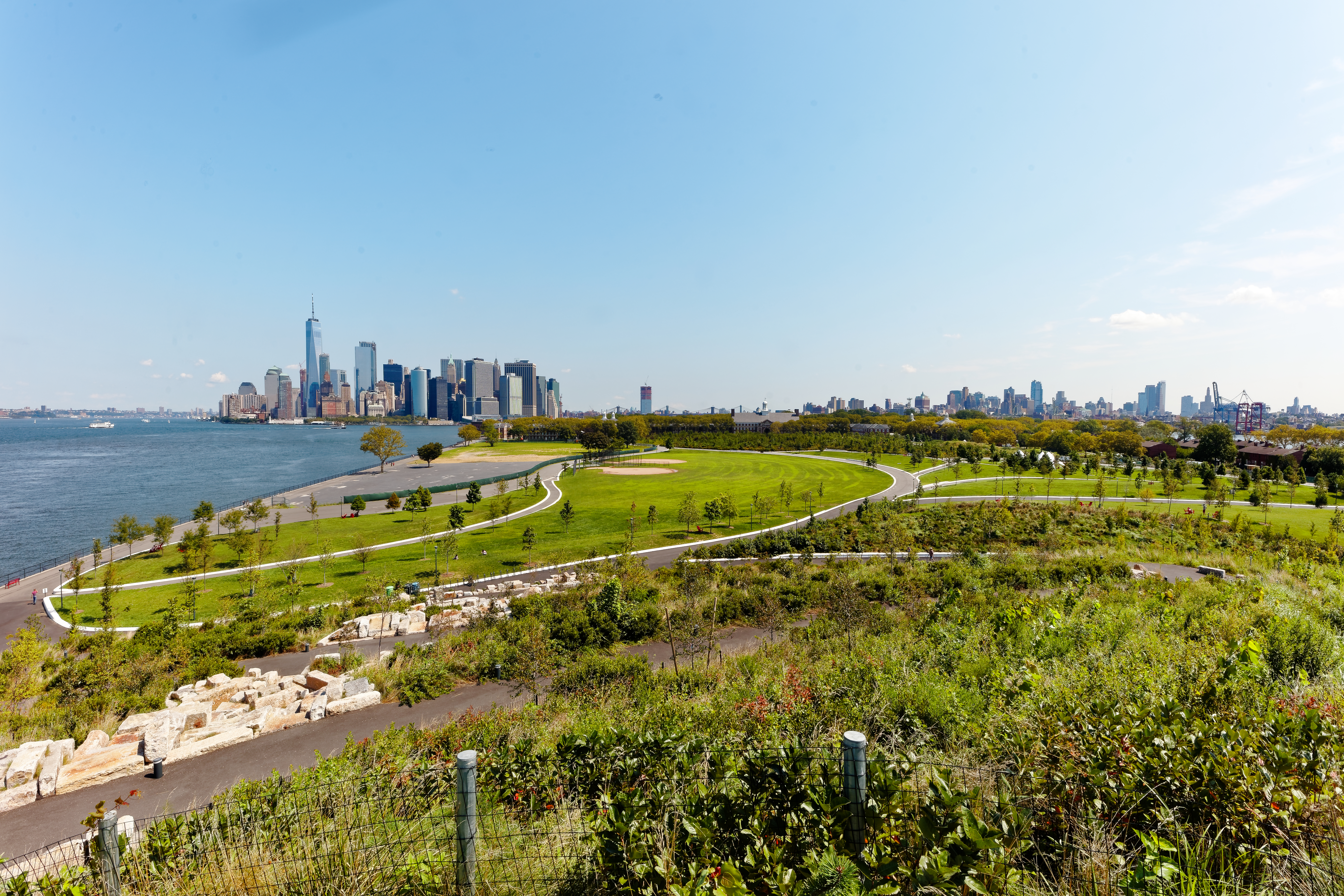
A view of the parklands. Manhattan's Financial District is visible in the distance.

The south end of the park contains the Hills section of Governors Island, which covers 10 acres. The Hills consists of four hills that are 26 to 70 feet (7.9 to 21.3 m) high, and are made partially of reclaimed debris from the demolition of the island's former residential towers. Each hill has a trail that leads up to their peak. From shortest to tallest, the hills are the 26-foot Grassy Hill; the 40-foot (12 m) Discovery Hill, with site-specific artwork; the 40-foot Slide Hill, which contains four long slides; and the 70-foot Outlook Hill, which contains an observation area at its peak with views of New York Harbor, Lower Manhattan, and Brooklyn. The Hills includes over 41,000 shrubs and 860 new trees. The Hills cost $70 million to build; the construction of the Hills was funded in part by Google CEO Eric Schmidt, who donated $15 million.

At the southernmost tip of Governors Island is Picnic Point. This area contains grills and picnic tables close to the waterfront.

=== Other structures ===
When the Coast Guard abandoned Governors Island in 1996, there were 49 buildings built before 1917, mostly in the northern part of the island, and 121 buildings built after 1917, mostly in the southern part. The southern part was mostly residential and industrial, while the northern part was mixed-use. The island was relatively low-density with extensive open space.

==== Residential ====
Governors Island contains several clusters of low-rise officers' housing, now mostly unoccupied, though some structures are used as exhibits or for administrative purposes. The two largest sections of housing in the historical northern part of the island are Colonel's Row (buildings 403–410), as well as the structures around Nolan Park (buildings 1–20).

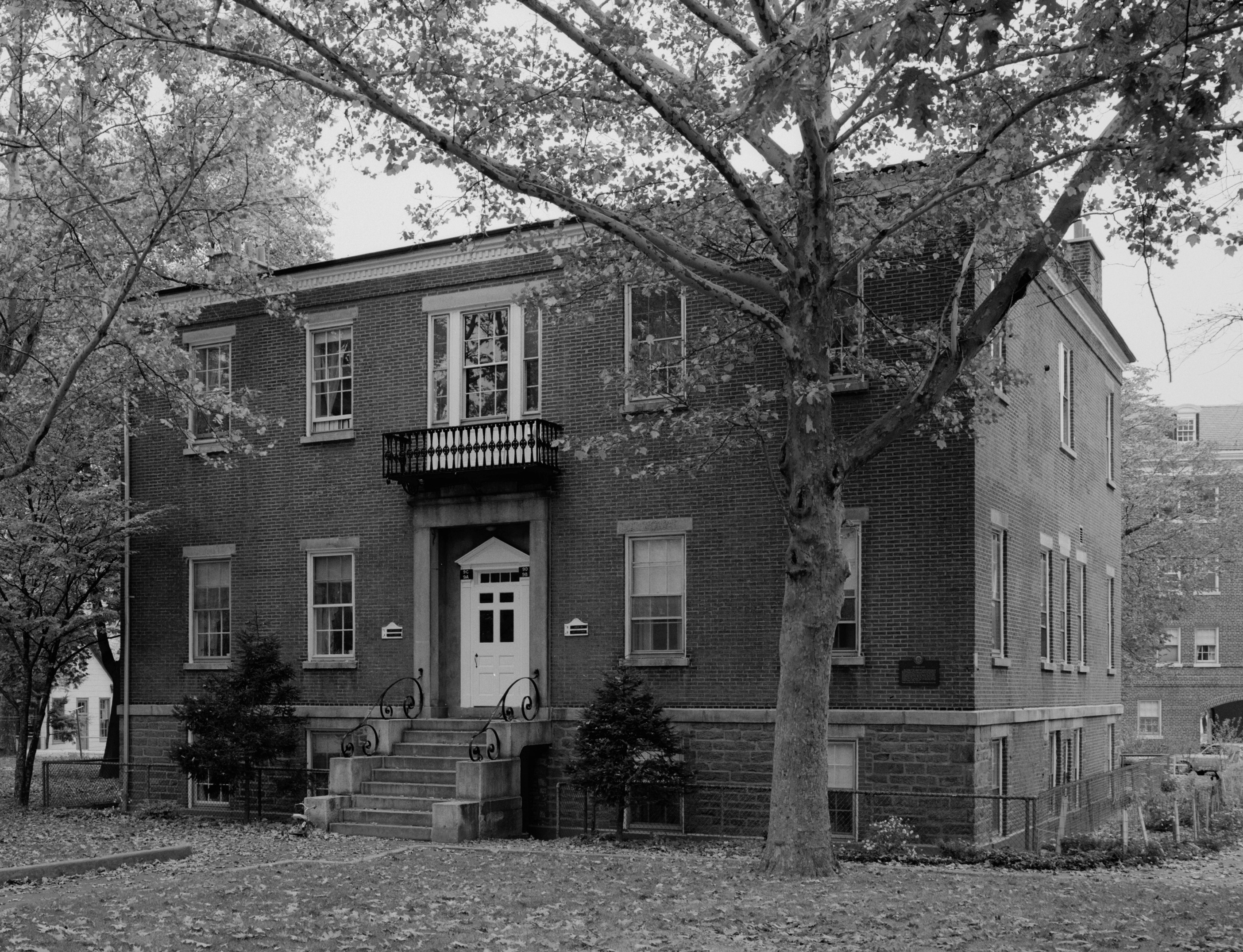
The Block House in Nolan Park

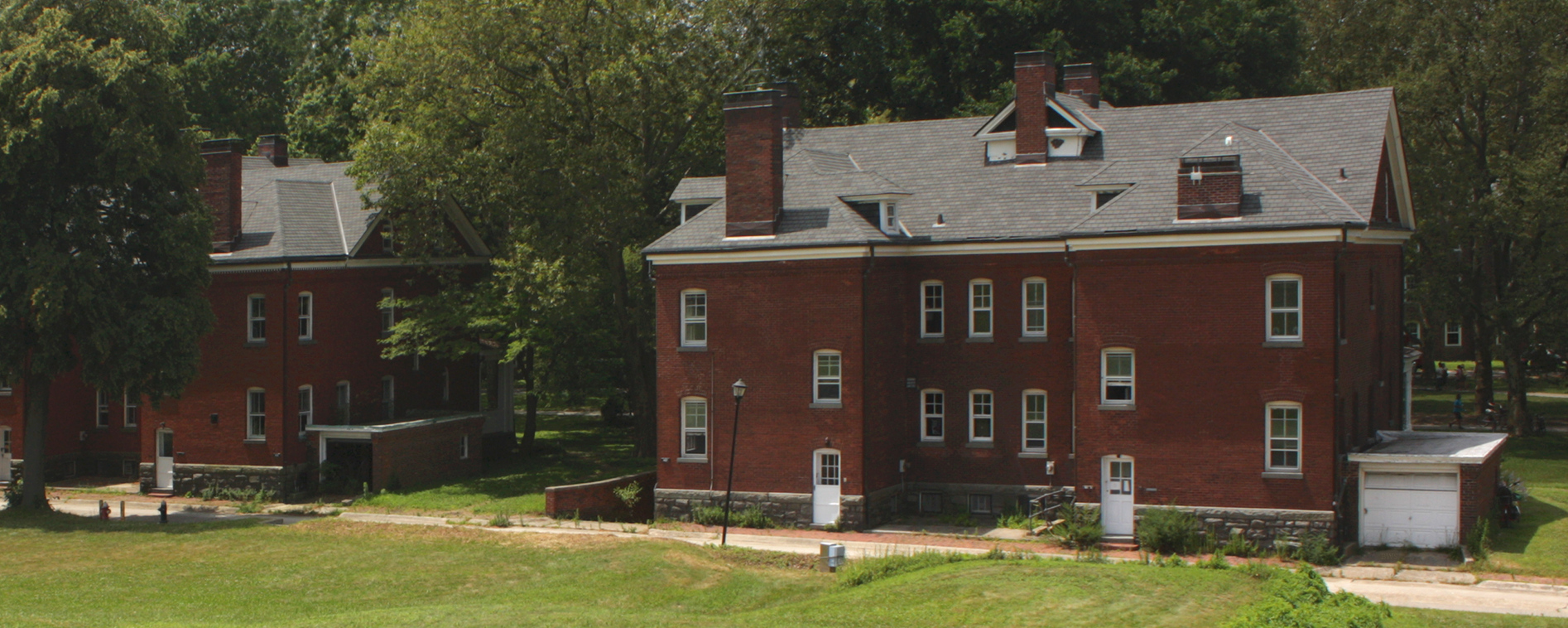
Colonels Row red brick houses, #406 and 407

Nolan Park contains several structures that are historical in their own right. The Admiral's House/Commanding Officer's Quarters (building 1), a two-story Colonial Revival brick house built in 1843, is listed separately on the NRHP and as a city landmark. To the north is the Governor's House (building 2), a two-story Georgian brick house built c. 1805–1813. The southeast corner of Nolan Park contains the Block House (building 9), a two-story Greek Revival building built in 1843, which served initially as a post hospital and later as administrative offices and officers' quarters. Buildings 3-5 (built in the 1850s), 6-11 and 14-18 (built in 1878–1879), and 19-20 (built in the 1890s) all served as two-company officers' quarters. Building 12, a three-story Georgian Revival brick apartment complex, was constructed in 1928 or 1931 to house the 16th Infantry Regiment.

The eastern side of Colonel's Row contains eight individual officers' quarters numbered 403 from north to south, which initially faced the original shoreline southwest of Hays Road. The first structures to be built, buildings 405–408, were designed in accordance with the same Quartermaster General plans, and were built in 1893-1895 as two-family duplexes. This was followed by buildings 403–404, built in 1904-1906 also to the same plan. The two-and-a-half-story building 409, a Colonial Revival structure, was designed as Bachelor Officers' Quarters and was completed in 1910, while building 410 was built as a duplex officer's quarters in 1917 and is the only structure of the Modified Arts and Crafts design on the island.

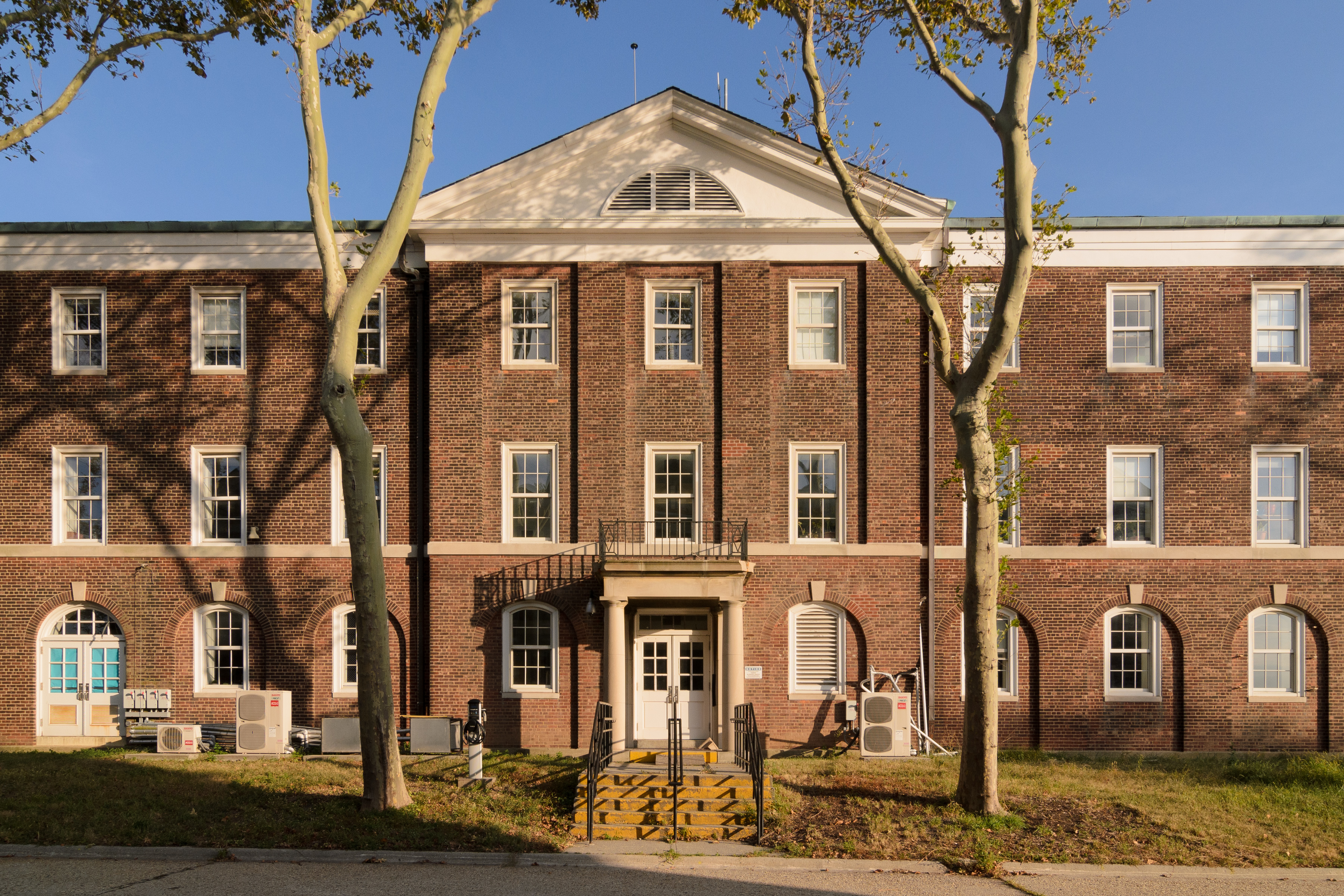
Building 550, now the New York Harbor School

The southwestern side of Colonel's Row is dominated by Liggett Hall (building 400), a three-to-four-story barracks that spans nearly the entire width of Governors Island, measuring 1,023 feet (312 m) long with two 225-foot-long (69 m) wings extending south. Initially built in 1930 for the 16th Infantry, it was among the largest military barracks in the world when completed, and was the first Army building intended to house an entire regiment. The building contains a ground-level arcade that bisects the first and second floors, as well as an annex to the southeast. Two nearly identical Georgian Revival structures, building 550 (now the New York Harbor School) to the north and building 333 to the south, are located directly adjacent to Liggett Hall. The three-story structures are both U-shaped with the wings surrounding a front courtyard; they were built in 1932 as detachment housing for the First Army before being used by the Coast Guard as classrooms. Nearby are a smaller pair of nearly identical 3 1/2-story family housing blocks for the 16th Regiment, built in 1940. These consist of building 555 to the north of building 550, and building 315 near the southern waterfront south of the YMCA and theater.

Several other residential structures exist throughout the northern part of Governors Island. Buildings 111 and 112, a pair of three-story neo-Georgian structures on the island's east side, were built in 1934 to a design by Rogers & Poor. These served as officers' quarters for the 16th Regiment, accommodating additional officers once Liggett Hall was full. Inside Fort Jay were four buildings numbered 202, 206, 210, and 214; these were nearly identical Greek Revival barracks that housed soldiers at the fort. The north side of the island, between Castle Williams to the west and Soissons Dock to the east, contains the Fort Jay Nurses' Quarters (building 114), a 2 1/2-story neo-Georgian brick-with-concrete structure designed by Rogers & Poor; this later became bachelor officers' quarters as well. Officers' quarters were also located in building 135, a former storehouse along the northeastern waterfront built in 1835.

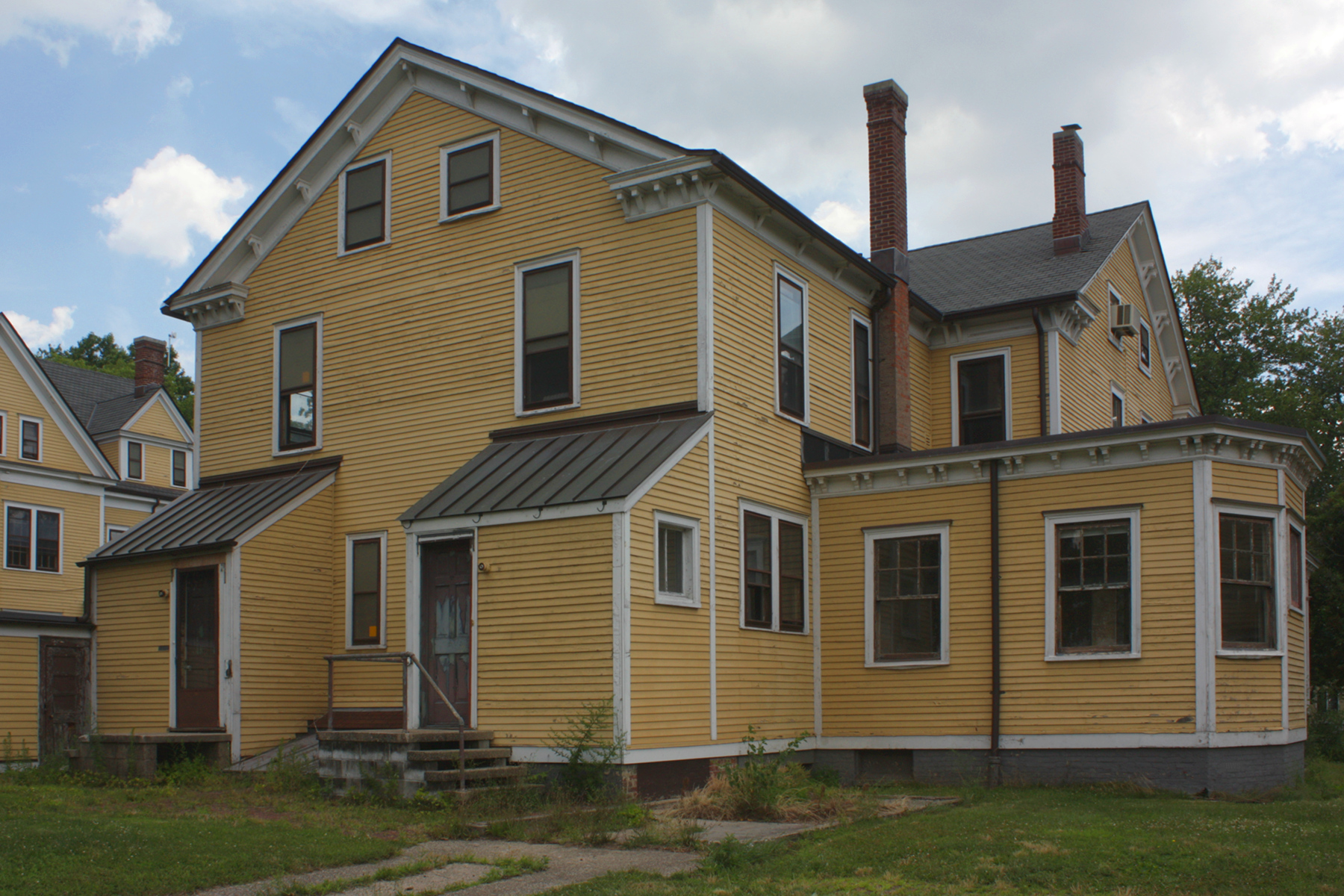
A two-and-a-half-story yellow house in Nolan Park

Many of the former residences located in Nolan Park and Colonels Row now serve as seasonal homes to a variety of arts and culture organizations that typically offer free programs for visitors during the Island's public season. During the 2020 season, when indoor programs were suspended due to the COVID-19 pandemic, many of the organizations based in these homes joined the Governors Island Residency Initiative, offering the houses as free workspace for artists and cultural workers.

Formerly, residential apartment blocks ranging up to 11 stories tall were located on the southern half of Governors Island. There were 594 total apartments each with 2 to 5 bedrooms, spread out across three apartment complexes. Unlike the housing on the island's north side, these structures were not historically protected. The largest of these structures, the 11-story, 165-unit Cunningham Apartments (building 877), was located on the island's north side. Built in 1968, it was imploded in 2013, something uncommon in the city.

==== Religious ====
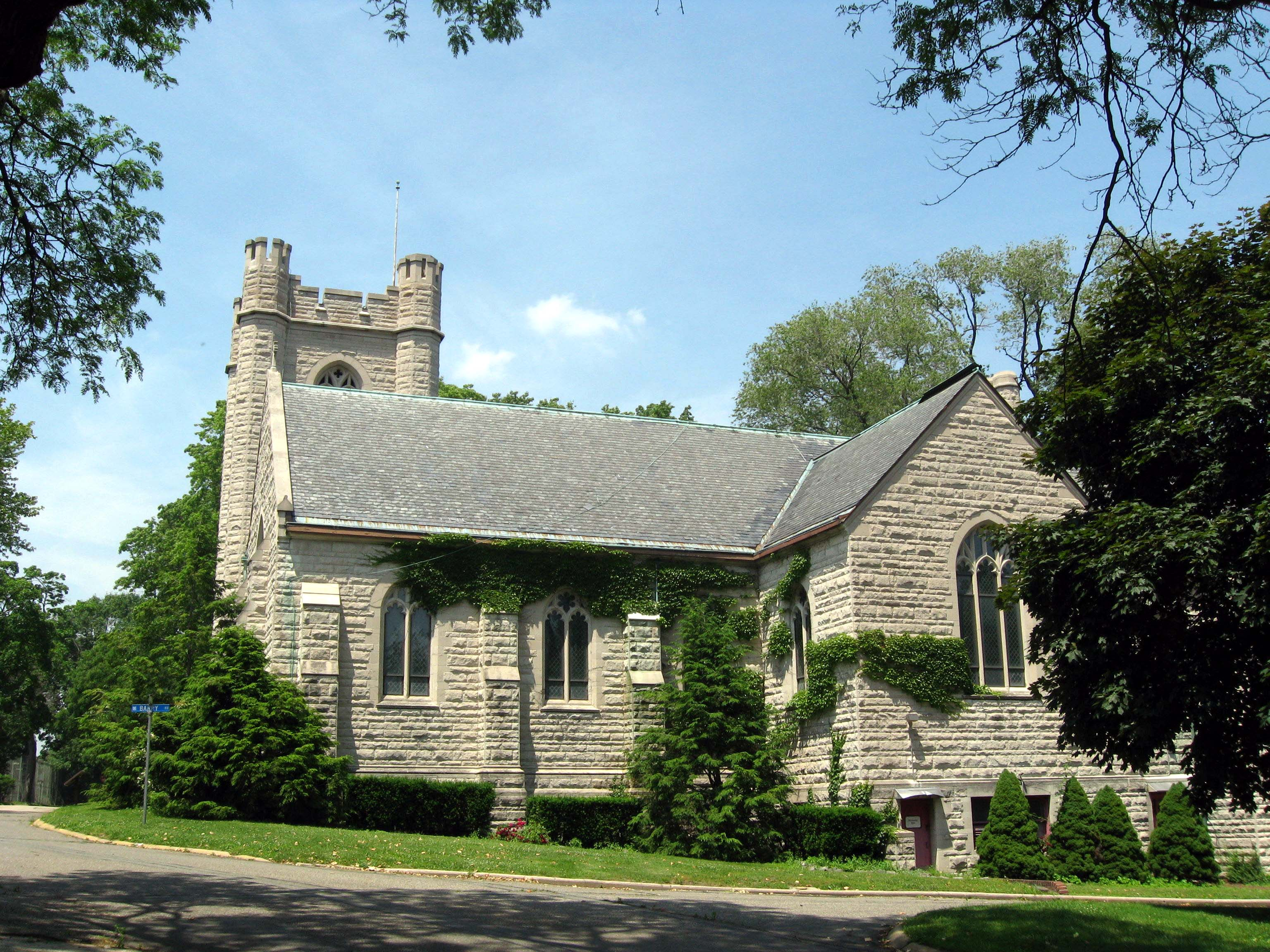
Episcopal Chapel of St. Cornelius

Religious practice on Governors Island dates to the opening of the first chapel in 1846. There later came to be three houses of worship on Governors Island. The Chapel of St. Cornelius the Centurion (building 13), a two-story limestone structure in the southern part of Nolan Park, was designed by Charles C. Haight and built in 1907, replacing the old 1846 chapel. Throughout the chapel's history, chaplains have been assigned by several different entities, namely the Army, Coast Guard, and Trinity Church. Maintenance was performed by Trinity Church until 1986, when it turned operations over to the Coast Guard under condition that Trinity Church would resume maintenance duties if and when the Coast Guard left the island.

A Catholic church called Our Lady, Star of the Sea was built in 1942. The one-story clapboard structure is located at Clayton and Comfort Roads on the north shore of Governors Island.

A synagogue housing Congregation Shaare Shomayim was established in 1960 in what is known as building S-40. The one-story clapboard building, located east of Barry Road on the island's east shore, was initially a "temporary" building used for storage.

==== Office and storage ====
Several buildings were built as part of the Arsenal but have not been used as residential structures, instead being utilized for office or storage space. These include buildings 104 and 107, originally used as storehouses; 105, a two-winged structure used as an armory and office; and 110, used as a quartermaster's depot and storehouse. Building 110 is now home to the Lower Manhattan Cultural Council's Arts Center at Governors Island, which opened in September 2019. All were built in brick from the 1850s through 1870s. Buildings 106 (pump house) and 108 and 109 (offices) were built during the 1940s in the same style as the other structures, though building 109 replaced a wooden structure built in 1918. Pershing Hall (building 125), a three-story brick building north of buildings 107 and 108 on the northern waterfront, served as the headquarters for the First Army when built in 1934.

The waterfront contains several buildings, including building 130, the original Arsenal workshop, as well as building 134, a modern structure which hosted offices for USCG Group: Station New York. Governors Island also has several small vehicular garages of varying styles. Most of these garages were built in the 1930s and 1940s during the WPA's renovations of the island.

As of 2023, a climate laboratory developed by Stony Brook University is being developed on Governors Island. The lab, designed by Skidmore, Owings & Merrill, is to consist of two narrow timber structures connected by a solar-paneled roof. The structures will be placed 8 feet (2.4 m) above the rest of the island, with a curving facade and solar roofs.

==== Service structures ====
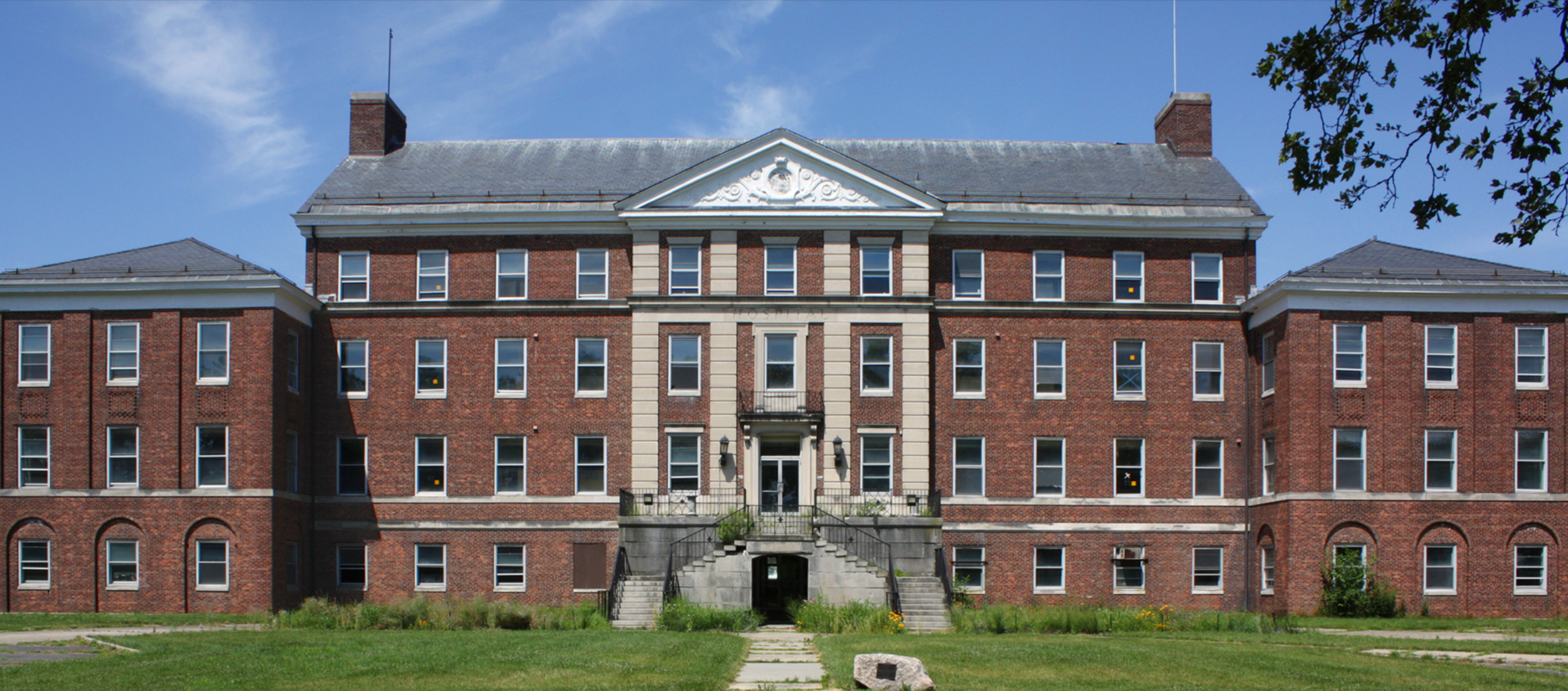
Building 515/Post Hospital

The northwest side of the island hosts building 515, the former Post Hospital, later used as enlisted bachelors' housing. The three-story brick-and-limestone building was constructed in 1935 to a Neo-Georgian design by McKim, Mead & White. Nearby is the Tampa Memorial Library (building S-251), a one-story rectangular wooden building. Constructed in 1908, it originally served as a storehouse and was renamed after the sinking of the cutter Tampa in 1918.

The area around the South Battery, south of the Parade Ground, includes several former service structures. Building 301, a single-story brick building near the waterfront, housed an elementary school called PS 26. It was originally built in 1934, though two wings were added in 1959–1960. To the west is building 324, constructed in 1926 as the Army YMCA. The War Department Theater (building 330), a two-story 700-seat theater built in 1937–1939, is located west of the YMCA, facing the southern portion of Governors Island.

Formerly located near the South Battery was the former Governors Island Guest House/Super 8 Motel in building 293. The one-and-a-half-story brick building was originally a quarters built in 1871–1872. The abandoned motel was demolished in 2007–2008 to expand the Parade Ground. On the southern part of Governors Island was building 785, which included a fast-food restaurant and a bowling alley. Building 902 houses several FDNY fire protection vehicles.

=== Monuments ===
The Monumental Setting for Bronze Plaque, a brick monumental bench with stone trim between buildings 406 and 407, was built by the WPA in 1938. The Early Birds Monument, originally dedicated in 1954 south of Liggett Hall, is a bronze cast of a Wright Brothers' plane's propeller on a granite base that commemorates early aviation on the island.

== Operations ==
=== Management ===
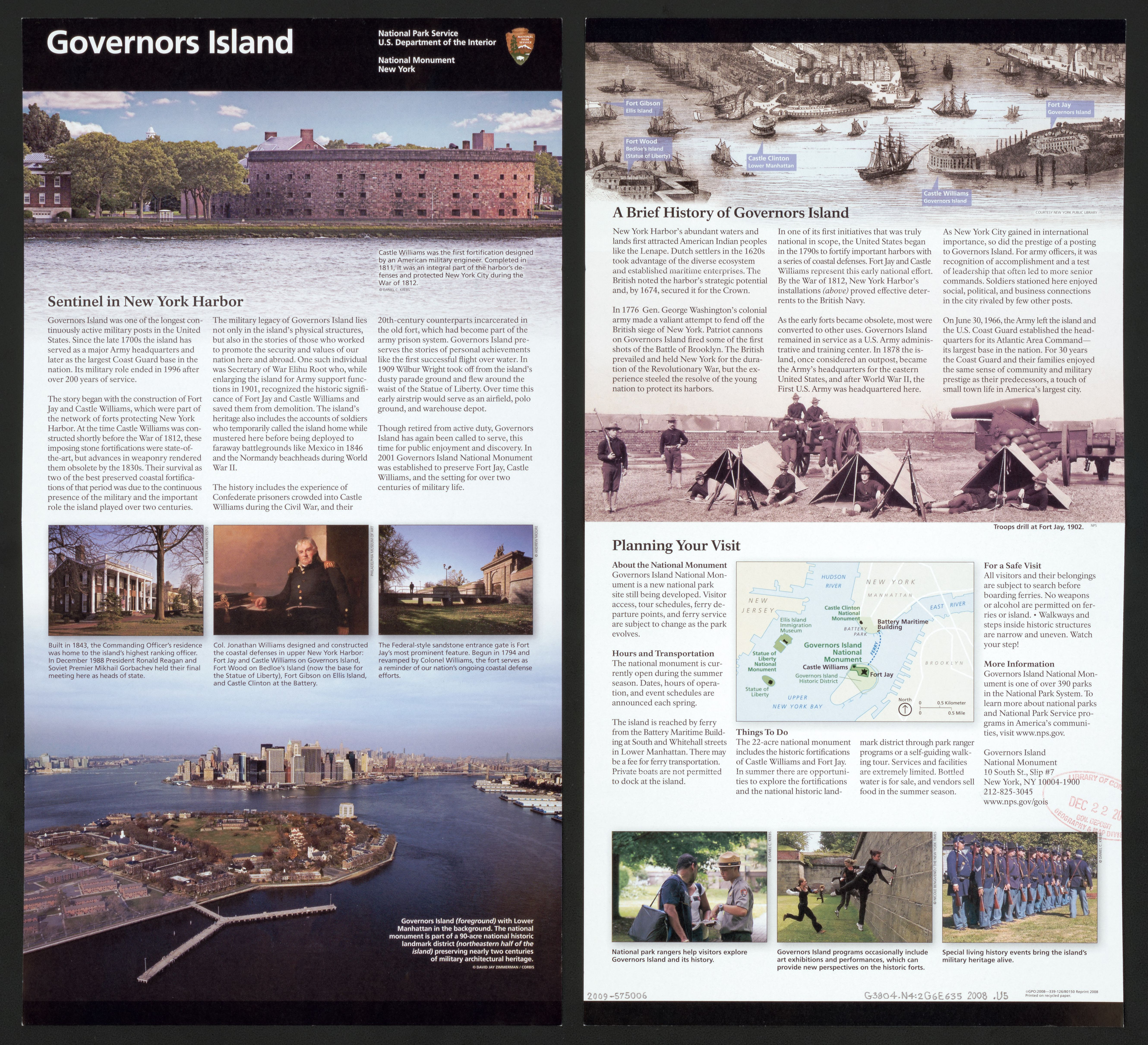
Site-specific information panel, one of many installed by the National Park Service within Governors Island National Monument

Three organizations work in partnership to maintain the island: the National Parks of New York Harbor Conservancy, the Trust for Governors Island, and Friends of Governors Island.

==== National Parks of New York Harbor Conservancy ====
The National Parks of New York Harbor Conservancy, a 501(c)(3) non-profit organization, is responsible for managing the 22 acres (8.9 ha) that comprise the Governors Island National Monument. It works with the National Parks of New York Harbor (a branch of the National Park Service) in a public-private partnership, and is the official nonprofit partner for the National Parks of New York Harbor. The Conservancy was founded in 2003 because the NPS is legally prohibited from operating its own business ventures. The National Park Service owns and operates the monument itself.

==== Trust for Governors Island ====
The Trust for Governors Island, legally the Governors Island Corporation, is a nonprofit organization of the city government that is responsible for managing the redevelopment for the rest of the island. Its predecessor, the Governors Island Preservation and Education Corporation (GIPEC), was founded in 2003, when Governors Island was sold to the public. At the time, GIPEC was a partnership between the city and the state. In April 2010, the city entered an agreement to take full control of the island's development from the state of New York. GIPEC was then dissolved and superseded by the Trust for Governors Island.

The Trust is charged with the planning, redevelopment, and ongoing operations of the 150 acres (61 ha) that are not part of the national monument. The organization is also responsible for coordinating public art displays on the island. The Trust's first artistic curator, Meredith Johnson, was hired in 2016. In 2024, Lauren Haynes was appointed as the Trust's head curator.

==== Friends of Governors Island ====
The Friends of Governors Island is the private nonprofit organization that manages the island's operations and programming. It was founded as the Governors Island Alliance in 1995, following the Coast Guard's decision to vacate the island. The Alliance and its 50 member organizations led a campaign to return the island to New York for public purposes. Since 2014 the Alliance has been an independent non-profit, and in 2016 it was renamed Friends of Governors Island. The Friends run volunteer and membership programs, raise money and perform advocacy for the island.

=== Working animals ===
Governors Island employs working dogs to chase the Canada geese off of the island. The working dogs provide a humane geese dispersal method for the super flocks of Canada geese that migrate through the New York Harbor. Before the dog program started in 2015, attempts to use R/C cars, strobe lights, and a special laser to chase the geese all failed. The Working Dogs program began in January 2015 with a Border Collie named Max; as of 2019 the Governors Island working dog team is composed of four dogs. A Border Collie named Quinn was added to the team of working dogs in 2017, followed by a Border Collie named Chip in mid-2018 and a mini Aussie named Aspen in late 2018. The dogs are popular on social media with a growing following. In addition to their duties chasing geese, the dogs serve as ambassadors to Governors Island guests.

In 2021, the Trust for Governors Island began borrowing sheep from the Tivoli Lake Preserve and Farm to eat invasive species during the summertime. The original three sheep were joined by two more sheep in 2024. In 2025, the Friends of Governors Island announced that the sheep program would be discontinued after that year, since the sheep were no longer needed.

=== Cannonball removal ===
The majority of cannonballs and shells from the island's military history had already been removed by the 21st century. In 1900, the government sold 5,635 tons of cannonballs to an iron dealer who intended on smelting the iron in order to build trains and other machinery. More were sold in 1942 and smelted down to support World War II manufacturing efforts. Cannonballs continue to be found: for example, a 350-pound cannonball was found near Soissons Landing in 2012 and deemed to not be at risk of explosion. Inactivated cannonballs are available for viewing near Fort Jay.

== Activities ==
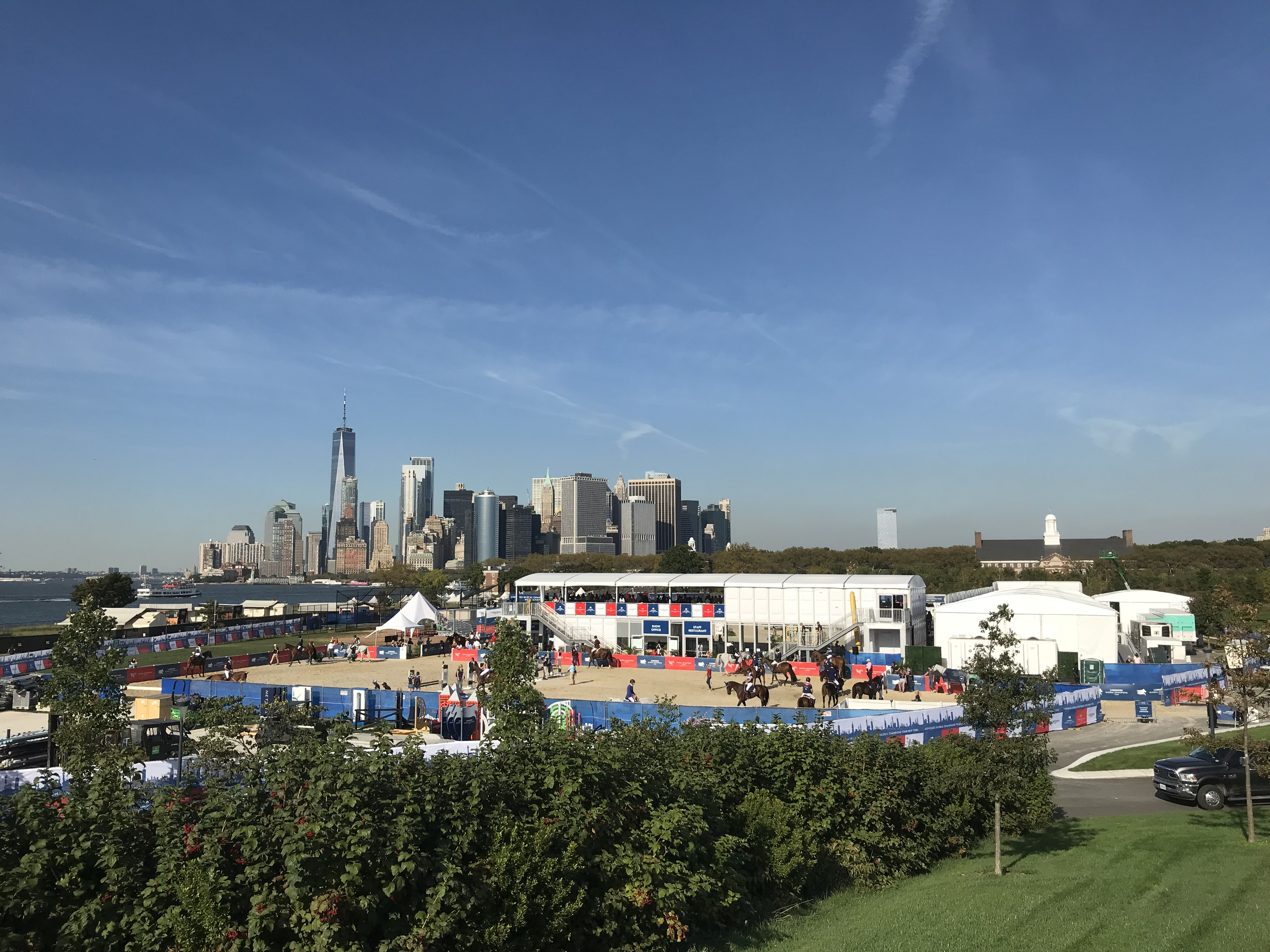
Looking north from the Hills at the Longines Global Champions Tour event site in 2019

Activities on the island include free National Park Service tours of the National Monument, bike riding, picnicking, art installations, fairs, festivals, and concerts. The northern half contains Governors Island National Monument as well as the Governors Island Historic District. The southern half contains the 43-acre park constructed and operated by the Trust for Governors Island.

=== Recurring activities ===
Various free activities are offered on Governors Island. The houses around Nolan Park and Colonels row host arts, culture and educational exhibits during typical public seasons. Downtown Boathouse has offered free kayaking classes at Pier 101. In addition, there are several NPS-operated walking tours and self-guided tours of Governors Island's historic landmarks. Other public programs and exhibits are available, including an adventure playground operated by play:groundNYC called The Yard, as well as a compost site run by Earth Matter called the Compost Learning Center and a functioning urban farm, the Teaching Garden, run by GrowNYC. The American Indian Community House, a non-profit that works to improve the well-being of the American Indian community and increase visibility of the community's culture, uses the Admiral's House to present exhibitions, performances, and other cultural and educational programs.

Some activities require additional fees. QC NY, an Italian-based day spa spanning two buildings on the north side of the island, contains a courtyard with heated pools and lawn chairs overlooking Manhattan; it offers personal treatments in addition to its saunas. Collective Retreats, a glamorous camping or "glamping" retreat, allows its guests to use the island three hours before the island opens to the general public each day, and several tiers of accommodations and activities are provided at progressively higher prices. Though Collective Retreats can accommodate about 70 campers per night, there are no full-time residents on the island as of 2022. For travel throughout the island, Blazing Saddles rents out bikes and pedicabs, and there are also three Citi Bike bike-sharing stations on the island.

=== Events ===
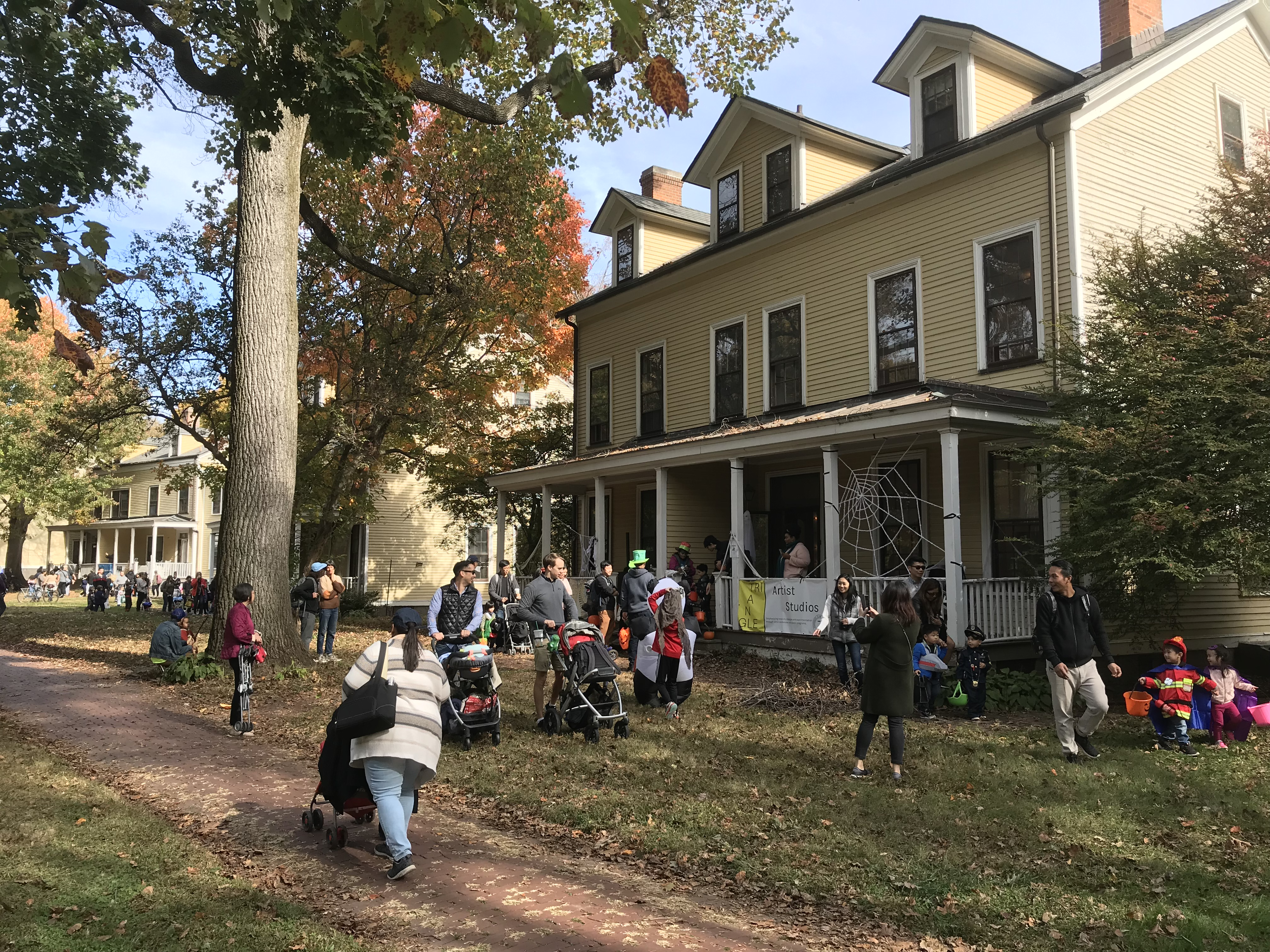
Visitors trick-or-treating during the Island's Pumpkin Point fall event in Nolan Park, October 2019

Many events take place on Governors Island during a typical public season including outdoor films, food and art festivals, runs, concerts, and a pumpkin patch in October. The Trust for Governors Island operates a program called Governors Island Arts, in which art and public programs are presented on the island. Several organizations-in-residence are selected every year to present activities on Governors Island. Since 2010, Governors Island Arts has operated Organizations in Residence, an artist-in-residence program on the island, every year. The New York City Poetry Festival is also hosted annually on the island, as is the Ice Sculpture Show. Governors Island hosts the annual New York Sail Grand Prix event.

Concerts have also taken place on the island. For instance, the Rite of Summer Festival, a series of free concerts, has been held on the island throughout the summer since 2011. The Jazz Age Lawn Party, a two-day-long Prohibition-era cosplay event, is also hosted on the island. In September 2019, the Longines Global Champions Tour, a globe-traveling equestrian jumping league, made its New York debut on Governors Island. A food festival called the Great Nosh was also hosted on Governors Island starting in 2025.

Past attractions have included a Dutch festival called Goverthing in 2009, as well as a French carnival in 2013 that contained 19th- and 20th-century rides. Several previous large concerts have also been held on Governors Island. These include the inaugural Governors Ball Music Festival in 2011, though it moved to Randalls Island for subsequent seasons. Governors Island Art Fair, run by the art collective 4heads, took place annually on the island from 2008 to 2023. Originally located in buildings on Colonel's Row, the event has also hosted artists in Castle Williams and Fort Jay.

== Public access ==
Since 2021, Governors Island has been open year-round, operating from 7 a.m. to 6 p.m. seven days a week. Until 2015, Governors Island was publicly accessible only on summer weekends and was rarely open during nighttime except during concerts. From 2015 to 2020, the island was open seven days a week, but only from May through October.

=== History ===
The first public boat service to Governors Island was instituted in 1794, when John Hillyer was given a franchise to operate a rowboat line to the island, collecting a fare of three cents per person. The Army took over the franchise as passenger traffic grew, operating barges from South Ferry or the Battery in Manhattan. The first recorded port of departure at the Battery, located south of what is now Castle Clinton, opened in 1854. At that point, there were two barges that each had a maximum capacity of 12 people. Test runs of steamboat service started in 1844, and they supplanted the former open-barges by 1879. Many of the passengers were employees at the New York Armory on Governors Island. By 1879, an "ugly little tug" that charged 15-cent fares for travel to the island was replaced with a steamboat.

Around 1897, it was announced that the ferry service would be overhauled to accommodate the expanded Army presence on the island. Three new ferryboats with capacity of 823 passengers and 21 cars were added in 1925–1929. Two of these were replaced in 1956 with larger vessels that could hold 1,100 passengers and 32 cars.

Public ferry access from Manhattan started in 2005; at the time, the ferry was free on weekends. Starting in 2010, weekend ferry service commenced between Governors Island and Brooklyn Bridge Park's Pier 6 at Atlantic Avenue. In June 2011, NY Waterway started service to points along the East River. On May 1, 2017, that route became part of NYC Ferry's East River route. A new 400-person vessel named Governors 1 as delivered in 2019 in anticipation of large crowds, supplementing the existing vessel Lt. Samuel Coursen. The same year, NYC Ferry added a weekend-only shuttle from Pier 11/Wall Street to Governors Island, replacing the East River and South Brooklyn service to the island. In December 2023, the federal government awarded $7.5 million for the construction of electric charging equipment for the Governors Island Ferry fleet.

=== Current services ===
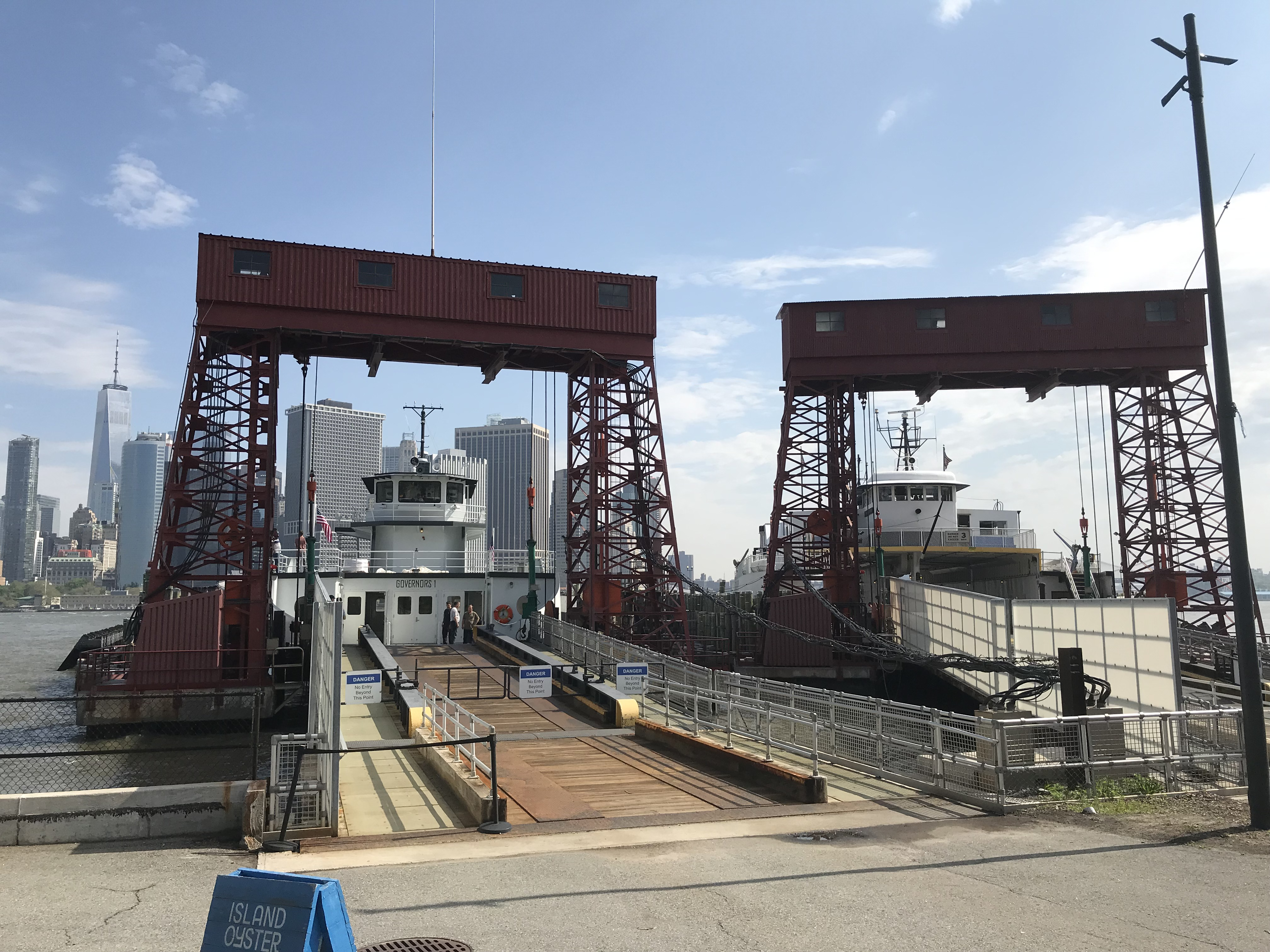
Governors Island's two ferries, the Governors 1 (left) and Lt. Samuel Coursen (right) docked at Soissons Landing at the north end of the island in 2019.

Governors Island has two ferry landings: Soissons Landing and Yankee Pier. Soissons Landing, located at the northern shore of the island, contains two slips. The current cast-iron piers of Soissons Landing were built in 1947 and commemorate the Battle of Soissons during World War I, during which over half of the 16th Regiment were killed. Building 148, a brick waiting room built in 1917, is located directly to the west. Ferries travel from here to Slip 7 at the Battery Maritime Building, located adjacent to the Staten Island Ferry Whitehall Terminal in Manhattan's Financial District. The ride is about 7 minutes long. These ferries are operated by HMS Ferries for The Trust for Governors Island and operate daily when the island is open.

Ferries also operate to Yankee Pier on the southeastern side of the island, which is served by two ferry routes. One route is operated by HMS Ferries for The Trust on weekends and travels to Red Hook since 2020, (though it traveled to Pier 6 of Brooklyn Bridge Park prior to 2020). The second route is the Governors Island route operated by NYC Ferry; during summer weekends, the route travels to Pier 11/Wall Street in Manhattan's Financial District, where it meets the other six NYC Ferry routes. Starting in November 2021, NYC Ferry has run the South Brooklyn route from Yankee Pier. As of 2026, the South Brooklyn ferry terminates at Governors Island year-round, operating to East 34th Street Ferry Landing via Red Hook, Pier 6 of Brooklyn Bridge Park, Pier 11/Wall Street, and Corlear's Hook.

As of 2026, ferries operated by the Trust run half-hourly. The Trust charges a round-trip fare of $5; children, seniors, and certain groups of adults ride for free, and no fare is charged before 11:00 a.m. on weekends. While the ferry to Manhattan operates daily, the ferry to Brooklyn operates only on weekends. NYC Ferry services run half-hourly and charge a separate fare from the Trust's ferries.

Governors 1, entered service in 2019; it can carry 400 passengers and can travel at up to 14 knots (26 km/h; 16 mph). The Harbor Charger, a hybrid diesel-electric ferry with a capacity of 1,200, entered service in 2025. The Harbor Charger replaces the Samuel S. Coursen, a passenger and vehicular ferry built for the Army in 1956 and named for soldier Samuel S. Coursen.

== Notable people ==
- Neal Adams (1941–2022), comic book and commercial artist; born on the island
- Withers A. Burress (1894–1977), commanding general of the 100th Division during World War II; finished his military career as commander of the First United States Army at Fort Jay from 1952 to 1954.
- Winfield Scott Hancock (1824–1886), United States Army officer and a Democratic nominee for President of the United States; died at the island while in command of the Military Division of the Atlantic
- Peter Marzio (1943–2010), former director of Museum of Fine Arts, Houston
- Smothers Brothers (Tom Smothers born 1937 and Dick Smothers born 1939), entertainers; born on the island

== See also ==
- List of Civil War prisons and camps
- List of National Historic Landmarks in New York City
- National Register of Historic Places listings in Manhattan on islands
- List of New York City Designated Landmarks in Manhattan on smaller islands
