= The History of Prostitution =

The History of Prostitution: Its Extent, Causes and Effects throughout the World is a book published by William Wallace Sanger in 1858. It analyzes prostitution in different civilizations throughout world history with a particular focus on New York in the 1850s.

== Context ==
Sanger started his studies of medicine in 1842 in Wheeling, West Virginia and finished them in 1846 in New York City. In the same year, he was appointed first resident physician of Blackwell's Island. This island had been used by the city for almshouses, prisons, asylums and other institutions since 1826 and due to a large number of residents, the governors of Blackwell's Island found it necessary to have a resident physician. One of the main tasks of the resident physician was to cure prisoners with syphilis. Due to strong stigma against this disease, hospitals did not treat it and the only way for cure was to be sent to prison.

Syphilis had been a prominent and feared disease in the Western world since the times of Ancient Rome. In the 18th century its prevalence increased rapidly and continued to do so in the 19th century. While most European countries were at the time developing measures to contain the disease, this was not the case in North America as social stigma against syphilis was too strong to even acknowledge it. Therefore, infection rates increased particularly rapidly there and skyrocketed in the 1850s. The only ones who observed this increase were the staff of Blackwell's Island, the only place in which syphilis was treated, and particularly William W. Sanger who was the responsible physician for the treatment.

Concerned by this increase and overwhelmed by the number of patients, the Board of Governors of the Almshouse of Blackwell's Island issued a request to investigate the extent, origins, and consequences of syphilis in New York City on January 23, 1855. The president of the board, Isaac Townsend, was particularly concerned with this issue. The request was directed to William W. Sanger who, being the physician who treated the syphilis patients on Blackwell's Island, was deemed the expert on this topic. From interacting with the patients, Sanger knew that most infected people were either prostitutes or had infected themselves during intercourse with a prostitute. He thereby recognized that the spread of syphilis was inseparably tied to prostitution. From this he concluded that combating syphilis required combating prostitution. He was also of the opinion that to gather a full understanding of prostitution it was necessary to look beyond New York City and investigate the phenomenon in its entirety. Therefore, he responded to the request of the governors by investigating and accumulating all knowledge about prostitution that was accessible to him and conducting interviews with 2000 prostitutes in New York City. The book was written between 1856 and 1857. On February 13, 1858, a fire destroyed the island hospital in which it was stored before having been published. Sanger had to rewrite the book based on a first draft which had been preserved. He finalized it again on August 10, 1858, and published it on April 1, 1959.

== Contents ==
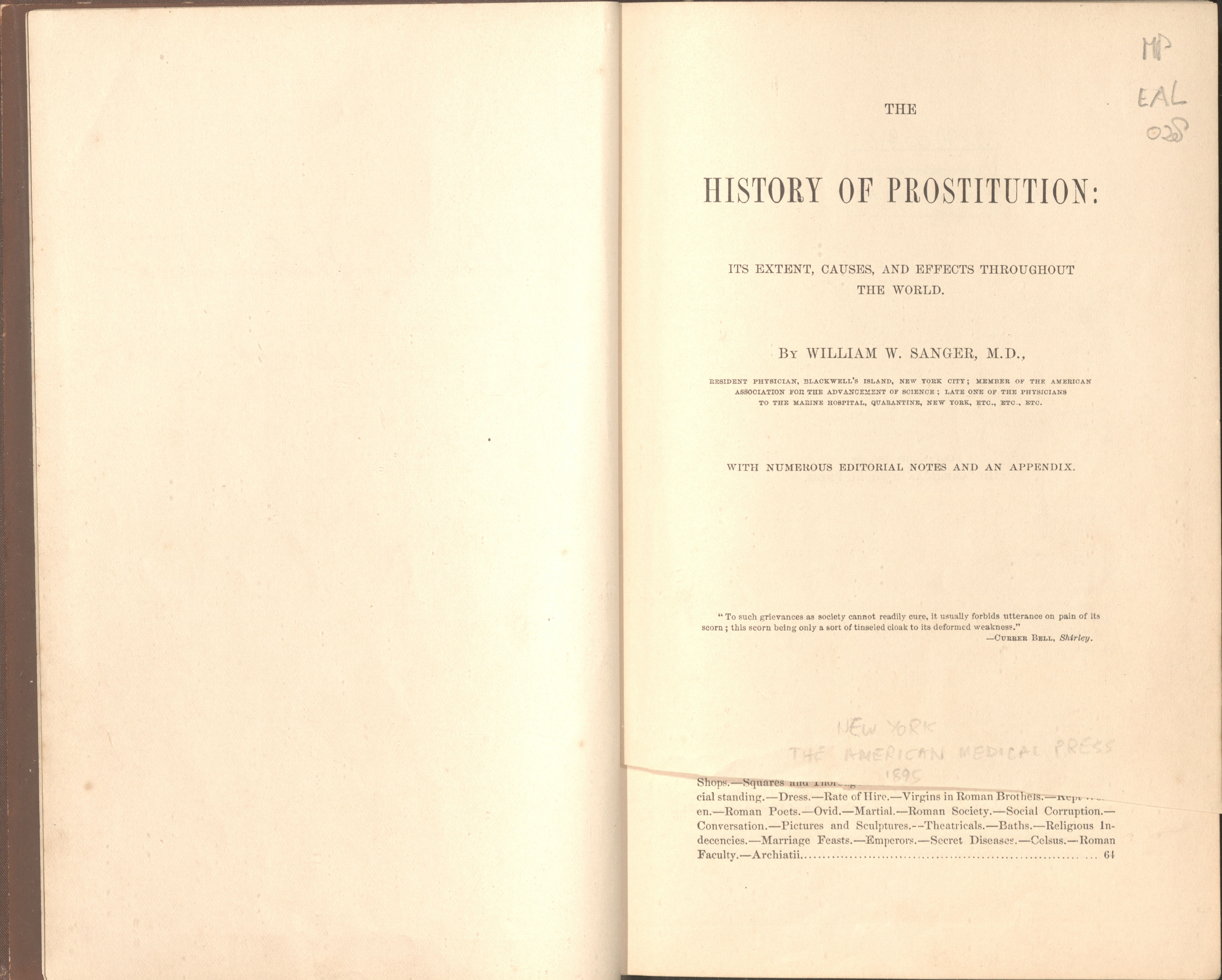
Title page

=== Chapters I-V: Prehistoric civilizations ===
Sanger begins his investigation by highlighting that prostitution is an evil that has always existed. He draws upon the oldest sources available to him which describe early Jewish civilizations. Some Jewish leaders had tolerated prostitution while others had acted strongly against it. Regardless, it had existed in all Jewish societies. Sanger explains that in every group there had been men whose appetite could not be satisfied by marital bonds and that it was women's weakness which made them susceptible to fall into satisfying illegitimate demands for money. Most Jewish leaders considered prostitution foul because of health concerns. Prostitutes were often found to have gonorrhea-like diseases which the Jews considered a sign of uncleanliness or evil possession and therefore concluded that prostitution was unclean business for which God punished them with disease. For this reason, the Jews were also convinced that the sin lies entirely within the woman who prostitutes herself, not the man who claims her services. Sanger furthermore hypothesizes that circumcision may initially have developed as an early measure against genital diseases and only later became a religious act.

In contrast to the Jews, prostitution was celebrated in Ancient Egypt. Sanger explains how the Egyptians displayed their sexuality and lust openly, and were often nude in public. Prostitutes were treated as regular members of society and regarded highly for their jobs. The temples were the only places in which sex and nudity were forbidden.

In Ancient Greece prostitutes were no longer celebrated, but still had a strong influence on politics and philosophy. Sanger compares the cities of Corinth and Sparta with Athens: While the former two showed conditions similar to the Egyptians in which sexuality and prostitution were displayed publicly without any backlash, in the latter some stigma against prostitutes existed depending on their status. Dicteriades were female slaves who were owned by the state and did not make any profit themselves. Their "prices" were considerably small and the money was all paid to the state. The dicteriades did not enjoy the same rights as regular citizens, but were treated as inferior and were kept away from noble districts and temples. Concubines were private slaves who had to answer to their master and mistress, and could also be used to satisfy the master's sexual desires. The hetairae, or kept women, were noble women who cohabited with a man and tended to his sexual urges. They were not as strongly stigmatized as other kinds of prostitutes, and had more freedom than the virtuous women who were not allowed to appear unveiled in public, attend the theater, or express philosophical thoughts. All of which the hetairae were permitted to do. Lastly, the auletrides, or flute-players, were foreign women who were usually not only flute-players but also dancers who the noble men could hire for events and who were not disinclined to also provide sexual favors to their clients if the price was right. Overall, while prostitutes were generally considered inferior and immoral, no such judgements were made about men who engaged with them. It was considered completely normal for them to engage with prostitutes or own concubines or hetairae by other men as well as their wives.

This was entirely different in Ancient Rome where men who engaged with prostitutes were shamed for their act. Still, the greater stigma was on the prostitutes themselves who were considered infamous and irredeemable. Nevertheless, prostitution was extraordinarily common in Rome. In order to bring it under control, the Romans developed a registration system in which every prostitute had to register herself at the state and unregistered prostitution was made illegal. However, this regulation was not enforced strongly and illegal prostitution was very widespread. Especially public institutions such as baths, taverns, shops, or the circus were full of prostitutes, male and female, looking for opportunities to earn extra money from visitors. Moreover, the Roman brothels celebrated the concept of virginity. Whenever a brothel received a new virgin as a prostitute, a crown of laurels over the door to her room would indicate her virginity to customers. The services of a virgin were more expensive than others, but afterwards the customer would be crowned with the laurels from her door, and celebrated by the brothel-keeper and other customers. In the early days of Christianity, the Romans would punish Christian virgin women by sending them as a slave to a brothel so as to take away their virginity. When the Roman Empire converted to Christianity, the landscape for prostitutes changed: The Christians preached and enforced chastity outside of marriage as a holy institution. Therefore, men were equally as guilty and sinful for engaging with a prostitute as the prostitutes were themselves. The Christians also introduced the idea of redemption and forgiveness for sinners. Thus, prostitutes were no longer considered irredeemable, but attempts were made to convert them to a virtuous life with the promise of complete forgiveness of their former sins. At the same time, the registration of prostitutes was abolished and there was no legal prohibition of prostitution. The Christians, however, prosecuted men who attempted to encourage or force women to engage in a life of prostitution, and punished them severely.

A small note is made about aboriginal northern European civilizations, in which women were obligated to chastity, and prostitution as a concept was effectively unknown.

=== Chapters VI-XXVI: Europe from the Middle Ages to 1858 ===
The largest part of Sanger's book is dedicated to describing how prostitution evolved in Europe from the Middle Ages until the time at which the book was written. Although the specific conditions varied from state to state, the situation was similar throughout the continent. Throughout the Middle Ages, prostitution was common and popular in all of Europe in all social classes. For the European royals it was generally custom to sleep with anyone they wanted regardless of their class or status. They would keep their affairs in the palace, visit public brothels, demand the spouses or children of other nobles, and generally engage with whomever they wanted, whenever they wanted. However, while it was perfectly accepted among the rich and the royal houses in particular, it was considered vile and disgusting among the poor. In some states, attempts at abolishing prostitution were made, but all of them were unsuccessful. They did, however, serve to increase public stigma against prostitution and were used by many people as a reason or excuse to terrorize and assault prostitutes and their affiliates. Leprosy was a common disease spread by intercourse at that time. Syphilis arose in Europe for the first time in Naples in the late 15th century. Although rumors claimed that it had been imported from America, there was no evidence for that claim.

France was the first country to introduce a successful regulation of prostitution that was inspired by the Roman registration system: Prostitutes had to register themselves in order to work. They had to pay taxes to the state and in turn were protected by it. Europe had taken over the spirit of the late Roman empire, according to which the greatest evil lay in those who introduced virtuous women to prostitution. As such, women could only enter a life of prostitution out of their own will and any act of procuring was punished with torture, public humiliation, or death. The laws, thus, protected women from being prostituted against their will, but also determined the conditions under which brothels had to be lead, how the brothel-keepers had to treat their prostitutes, and what they had to provide for them. They also forbade underage prostitution and prevented it effectively. The main concerns behind the regulation of prostitution, however, were health concerns and they mainly served as a manner to prevent the spread of diseases. As such, prostitutes received health inspections by a doctor every 14 days or had to report to one every week. Prostitutes who were diagnosed with a venereal disease were immediately removed from the brothel and brought to the doctor's institution where they received treatment for their condition. On the same note, it was illegal for men with a venereal disease to visit a brothel and for every infected prostitution attempts were made to trace the origin of her infection. These laws were very effective in reducing the spread of venereal diseases and generated additional income for the state. Because of this, they were soon adopted with only minor changes by almost all European states.

The degree to which prostitutes could redeem themselves varied across the continent. Spain was the most liberal in this regard. They had taken over their laws directly from the Romans and had maintained their sentiment the strongest. The stigma against prostitution was strongest in Prussia. Prostitution was tolerated as a necessary evil, but was not permitted and prostitutes were strongly oppressed. The Prussians also did not believe in redemption for prostitution and were generally so conservative in their views on love, sex, and prostitution that they were mocked by other countries for being "stricter than the church". Prussia was the only state that did not adopt the registration system by itself, but only after the French enforced it after conquering Prussia under Napoleon. In the 19th century, public complaints about prostitution and brothels inspired the Prussian state to abolish and forbid prostitution entirely. This attempt, however, backfired as it increased the amount of illicit prostitution to a multiple of the total amount of prostitution before, venereal diseases rapidly spread throughout society, and since prostitutes were no longer legally bound or restricted to certain areas of the city or specific customs, they were now appearing publicly in all areas and expressing indecency wherever they could. When this became obvious, the toleration system was restored and the registration system was reinstated. Although public complaints against prostitution continued to exist, no more attempts at abolishing prostitution were made thereafter.

In Great Britain, the conditions for prostitutes were by far the worst. Although laws supposed to regulate prostitution existed, they were not enforced well and thus mostly ineffective. Procurers and brothel-keepers were not surveilled by the state, and many of them abused their prostitutes. Furthermore, there was no strong legislation against rape and forced prostitution which were prevalent. Additionally, due to strong poverty, underage prostitutes were common. Prostitutes generally had to work harder and made less money than in other countries and diseases were more widespread - also among underaged - and treatment was barely accessible. For all these reasons, most prostitutes died within three to five years after entering the trade of prostitution.

Sanger also makes not of the church, pointing out that celibacy was not existent in the Middle Ages and that churchmen regularly sought out prostitutes to satisfy their urges even if they did not admit it. This extended to the papal court in Rome in which not only prostitution but also nepotism were prevalent. This practice describes the adoption of a younger relative or sometimes a stranger by a clergyman in order to provide for and take care of them. In reality, these adoptees were abused in all possible ways by their providers, including sexually.

=== Chapters XXVII-XXXI: Non-Western civilizations ===
Sanger divides the non-Western civilizations of his time into three categories: Native American, barbarous, and semi-civilized.

The native American nations by which he refers to those that have been successfully conquered by European or North American colonizers comprised Central and South America as well as the native Americans of North America. Sanger explains that the native Americans of Middle and South America generally showed an open attitude toward sex in which infidelity and unchastity were common occurrences. While prostitution was rare in Central America however, it was very common in the South American continent. He also points out that the South Americans did not show any shame about sex, and talked about it openly and publicly. For the native Americans of North America, he paints a different picture: In most tribes, women were seen merely as men's property, and had to serve and obey their husband, who had to buy them from their father. Thus, prostitution was not a usual occurrence as a woman usually would only have sex with her husband. The men on the other hand were not bound to monogamy and would often have multiple wives. A husband could resolve a marriage at any point and sell his wife to another man.

The barbarous nations included all African nations southern of the Sahara and the native people of Oceania including Aborigines and Māori. Most of these societies showed structures comparable to the North Americans, treating women only as male property who had to work for their husbands while the men usually engaged in polygamy. Indonesians and Borneans were the exception, showing patterns more comparable to the South Americans in which women were free, sex was treated as an open topic, and prostitution was common with only minimal stigmatization.

All remaining nations of the time were included in Sanger's semi-civilized nations. Among them were Persia, India, China, Japan, Turkey, Northern Africa, Inuit, and others. Similar to the barbarous nations, some of them viewed women only as property. However, prostitution existed in most of them and was often a profession or even an institution. In some of these nations, men sold out their wives for prostitution. In India and Japan, religious prostitution was known as well. The Inuit and the people of Iceland and Greenland were the only ones in which women were treated equal to men.

=== Chapters XXXII-XXXVII: New York in 1858 ===
To assess the situation of New York itself, Sanger conducted interviews with 2000 prostitutes in New York asking them about their demographics, situation, and motivation. In total he estimated there to be 6000 prostitutes in New York, meaning that about 1 out of every 200 people or 0.5% of the population was a prostitute. He found out that most prostitutes were poor and uneducated and were between 15 and 25 years old with teenage prostitution from 13 years old onwards being very common. It often resulted from desertion of the girl's family or lover. Sanger uses the word "seducing" for the occurrence of a man who would make a woman believe he was in love with her until she would run off with him only to abandon her after receiving sexual or other favors from her. Many prostitutes explained that they were seduced and were not allowed to return to their families afterwards, leaving them with no option other than prostitution. Others explained that they were forced or tricked into a life of prostitution. Among them there were also many who had been abused and beaten by their husbands, and escaped into a life of prostitution. There were also many widows. Some had been maltreated or abused by their parents and had fled from home, or had been banished. A big part of the prostitutes were immigrants who had come from Europe without any money and had no other way of making a living. Among those who had had another occupation before, they were not paid enough to make a living, and their male employers abused them and did not respect them or their work. Thus, they preferred prostitution as a work with better pay and better treatment. Sanger also describes that most prostitutes do not live longer than four years after entering prostitution. He explains that many prostitutes are killed in an act of hate and for those who are not the mental anguish resulting from immense social stigma drains them to the point of death. At the same time, the majority of children born by prostitutes die before the age of five. This is likely due to inherited diseases such as syphilis. Sanger explains that 40% of the prostitutes he interviewed admitted to having syphilis at the time of the interview, but he speculates that many of the others may also have it and not admit to it.

Sanger describes four classes of prostitutes in New York: The first class of prostitutes lived in so-called parlor houses, the owners of which provided them with luxurious clothing and residence. They were usually not seen in public and if they were, they could usually not be recognized. The second class of prostitutes resided in well-kept brothels. The brothel-keepers would also provide them with residence, food, and clothing, but it was not luxurious. This class of prostitutes would also walk the streets and frequent theaters to gain customers. Many of them had been first-class prostitutes before, but had lost some of their charms with age. The third class of prostitutes included mostly Irish and German immigrants. Their manners were somewhat coarser, comparable to the second class, but they would admit openly to being prostitutes rather than seduce unknowing men. The fourth class was poor, diseased, and dirty. They resided in shabby brothels, but had to provide food and clothing for themselves. The majority of prostitutes was from the lowest class. In addition, Sanger explains that kept mistresses also existed in New York and describes the houses of assignation. These were places that rented rooms to people to have illegitimate sex. Most houses of assignation also had prostitutes in their service.

Sanger now draws the connection between syphilis and prostitution. He explains that in 1857 15,000 cases of syphilis had been treated in New York, while the total number of cases was estimate to be between 74,000 and 140,000. He points out that these numbers had increased drastically throughout recent years and that the prevalence of syphilis was increasing rapidly. Pointing out the fact that at least 40% of prostitutes were infected with syphilis, this rapid spread must be due to prostitution. He then concludes his book by suggesting remedial measures to contain this disease: As the European examples have shown, attempts at prohibiting or eradicating prostitution are useless if not counterproductive. Instead, the state should allow prostitutes to reintegrate into society and lift them up instead of pushing them further down. This would by itself decrease the amount of prostitution. Prostitution should not have to be kept secret as this prevents proper treatment of containment of diseases. Instead, making prostitution public would deter some women from becoming prostitutes. Furthermore, it would make existing practices more decent, could confine prostitution to certain parts of the city, and would keep them away from public events. In addition, recognizing and taxing prostitution would provide a considerable source of income for the state and keep it in check. Regulation and medical surveillance of prostitution like in Europe are thus advisable to contain the disease and reduce prostitution. Medical care of syphilis must be freely accessible in a specialized hospital, medical visitations to brothels must be possible, detention of infected people by medical personnel must be possible, and decisions about the treatment of infected people must be exclusive to medical personnel. Patients must be treated until cured, not until the end of their sentence. At the moment, syphilis was only treated in prisons, which meant that people who wanted to get treatment for syphilis were forced to turn themselves in at the police for a crime they did not commit. Syphilis itself must not be treated as a sin. This only encourages prostitution in infected people who otherwise would not have sought it out. It also makes it less likely for prostitutes to abandon their calling once they have been infected, since they already view themselves as lost sinners at this point. The church saying that syphilis is a punishment for sin is hypocritical as delirium tremens, caused by excessive drinking, is treated without question. Furthermore, syphilis is heritable and children should not be punished for their parents’ sins. Finally, there need to be changes in the public mentality: Disrespectful and distrustful treatment of women in the workplace makes it more likely for them to fall into prostitution. So does the exclusion of women from many employments. The general heartless treatment of women as well as the apathy towards male abusers, traitors, and perpetrators perpetuate prostitution. Women must be treated as human beings, susceptible and sensitive. They have a right to justice. Male wrong-doers must be punished and shunned, not celebrated.

== Reception ==
It is not clear how the book was received by the governors of Blackwell's Island, but no noticeable changes resulted from it. In the general public, the book was highly controversial. Many considered prostitution to be a morally objectionable topic and resented Sanger for dealing with it openly. Among them, for example, was an article from the Dublin Quarterly Journal of Medical Science in 1859 which shuns Sanger for trying to humanify such an unvirtuous group of people. Others praised the book for the new insights it provided. Overall, the book stirred many local debates. Sanger was the first to point out that it was for the most part not seduction or rape that brought women into a life of prostitution but that many did so out of inclination or economic reasons. This idea contradicted the way in which women had been viewed before: Inherently pure, non-sexual, and virtuous, such that only a man could corrupt a woman to live the life of a prostitute. With Sanger's book, this idea was challenged and especially the economic motive was picked up by feminists to advocate for better working opportunities for women. Sanger was the first to systematically investigate prostitution which was considered groundbreaking by many. His empirical approach to studying a social issue had been unknown before and Sanger received a lot of credit for his innovative method. Apart from this, the book was largely inconsequential. Some movements of the later 19th century tackling poverty, employment, women's rights, or public health made reference to Sanger's book claiming to build on his findings. Generally however, not much information on or reference to the book can be found, indicating that its effect overall was small and his suggestions on how to improve the situation of prostitution and syphilis were not pursued further. In 2013, an article was published that criticized Sanger for misrepresentation of his findings from the point of 21st century feminism. According to this article, Sanger purposely described prostitution as an evil and prostitutes as victims and ignored the large proportion of women who chose the life of a prostitute out of their own inclination and will.

There were no changes in legislation or public health in New York following the publication of Sanger's book. At the same time, prostitution was widely legal in the United States of America and in Europe. In 1864, the United Kingdom passed the Contagious Disease Act, in which prostitution was acknowledged and the health and hygiene of its practices were enforced. Thus, the UK followed suit with the rest of Europe. Between 1910 and 1915, prostitution became illegal in most of the United States following Christian efforts. In the early 21st century, the legal and social status of prostitution and prostitutes vary widely from country to country. Notably, human rights organizations such as Amnesty International promote the decriminilization of prostitution around the world.

It is not known if William W. Sanger was involved further in the topic of prostitution, but he did not pursue this topic more after the publication of his book. He resigned from his position as resident physician in 1860 and conducted private practice from thereon.
