= The Assignation (disambiguation) =

The Assignation may refer to:

- The Assignation, a 17th-century comedy by John Dryden
- "The Assignation" (short story), an 1834 short story by Edgar Allan Poe
- The Assignation (short story collection), a 1988 book by Joyce Carol Oates

== See also ==
- House of assignation (disambiguation)
