= William Wallace Sanger =

American physician (1819–1872)

William Wallace Sanger (10 August 1819 in Hartford, Connecticut – 8 May 1872 in New York City) was a New York City physician who wrote an extensive study of prostitution.

== Biography ==
He began the study of medicine at Wheeling, Virginia (now part of West Virginia) in 1842, but soon afterward moved to New York City, and graduated from the New York College of Physicians and Surgeons in 1846. He was then appointed assistant at Bellevue Hospital, and subsequently was the first resident physician at Blackwell's Island. He afterward resigned and visited Europe, but in 1853 was reappointed.

During his second seven years' tenure of the office of resident physician, he was asked by the New York City alderman to look into the motives of prostitutes. He oversaw police interviews of 2000 women at Blackwell's Island. The results of his study he embodied in a work characterized by laborious research and comprehensive classification of the facts that he obtained, entitled The History of Prostitution (New York, 1858). In 1860, Sanger resigned and devoted the remainder of his life to private practice.
