= Roosevelt Island =

Island and neighborhood in New York City

Minnehanonck / Varken Eylandt (Note: "Eylandt" is the early-modern Dutch spelling; the word for "island" in 21st-century Dutch is eiland. In addition, different sources give slightly different spellings.) ('Hog Island') / Manning's Island / Blackwell's Island / Welfare Island
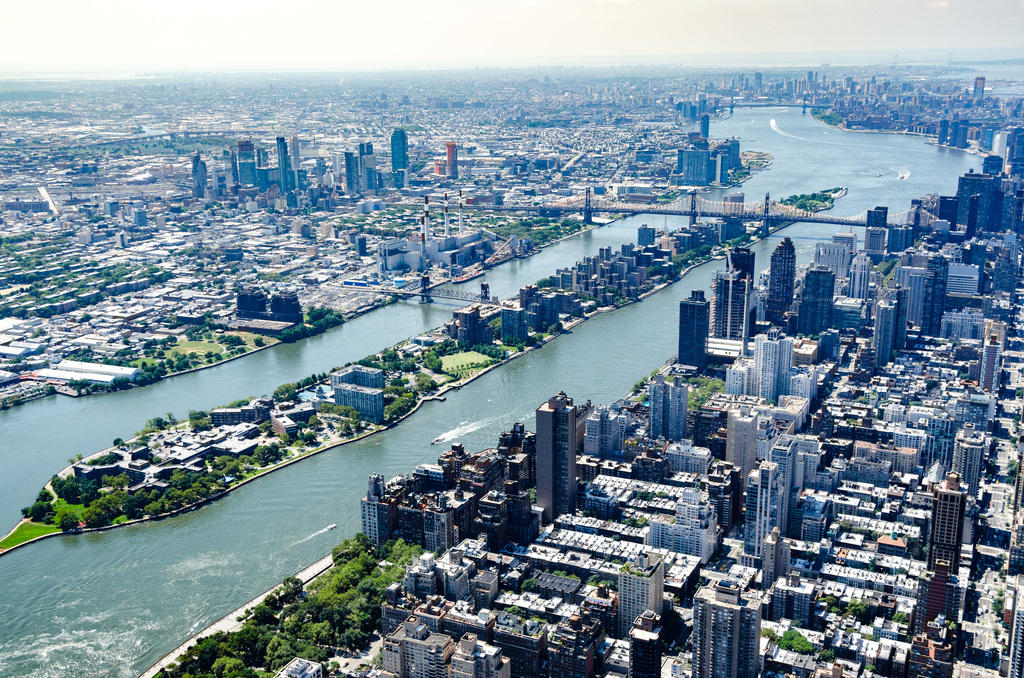
- Seen in July 2017 looking southward
- Location in New York City

Geography
- Location: East River, Manhattan, New York, US
- Coordinates: 40°45′41″N 73°57′03″W
- Area: 0.23 sq mi (0.60 km^{2})
- Length: 2 mi (3 km)
- Width: 0.15 mi (0.24 km)
- Highest elevation: 23 ft (7 m)

Administration
- United States
- State: New York
- City: New York City
- Borough: Manhattan

Demographics
- Population: 11,722 (2020)
- Pop. density: 50,965/sq mi (19677.7/km^{2})
- Ethnic groups: 36.3% white, 10.6% black, 12.3% Hispanic, 33.2% Asian or Pacific Islander, and 7.0% other races (as of 2020)

Roosevelt Island is an island in New York City's East River, within the borough of Manhattan. It lies between Manhattan Island to the west, and the borough of Queens, on Long Island, to the east. It is about 2 miles (3.2 km) long, with an area of 147 acres (0.59 km^{2}), and had a population of 11,722 as of the 2020 United States census. It consists of two largely residential communities: Northtown and Southtown. Roosevelt Island is owned by the city but was leased for 99 years to the New York State Urban Development Corporation (UDC) in 1969.

The island was called Minnehanonck by the Lenape and Varken Eylandt (Hog Island) by the Dutch during the colonial era and later Blackwell's Island. During much of the 19th and 20th centuries, the island was used by hospitals and prisons, with very limited access. It was renamed Welfare Island in 1921. Following several proposals to redevelop Welfare Island in the 1960s, the UDC leased the island, renamed it after former U.S. president Franklin D. Roosevelt in 1973, and redeveloped it as a series of residential neighborhoods. The first phase of Northtown, the island's first community, was completed in 1974, followed by the second phase (Northtown II) in 1989. Southtown was developed in the early 21st century, along with the Cornell Tech higher-education campus.

In addition to residential towers, the island has several buildings that predate the residential development, including six New York City designated landmarks. The island is accessible by numerous modes of transport, including a bridge, an aerial tram, and the city's subway and ferry systems. Many government services, such as emergency services, are provided from Queens, but the island also has a post office and a pneumatic garbage-disposal system. There are several parks on Roosevelt Island as well, including a promenade around the island's perimeter and Four Freedoms Park at its southern end. In addition to Cornell Tech, the island contains an elementary school. Several houses of worship are located on Roosevelt Island, and numerous community organizations have been founded there.

== Geography ==
Roosevelt Island is located in the middle of the East River, between Manhattan Island to the west and Queens to the east. The island's southern tip faces 47th Street on Manhattan Island, while its northern tip faces 86th Street on Manhattan Island. It is about 2 miles (3.2 km) long, (Note: A 1989 study gave a length of 1.97 miles (3.17 km).) with a maximum width of 800 feet (240 m). The island was 107 acres (43 ha) prior to the 18th century but has been expanded to 147 acres (0.59 km^{2}). Administratively, it is part of the New York City borough of Manhattan. Together with Mill Rock, Roosevelt Island constitutes Manhattan's Census Tract 238, which has a land area of 0.279 sq mi (0.72 km^{2}).

The island is one of the southernmost locations in New York City where Fordham gneiss, a type of bedrock commonly found beneath the South Bronx, can be seen above ground. The gneiss outcropping was surrounded by dolomite, which was worn down by East River currents, creating the current island. The layer of bedrock is shallow and is covered by glacial till, and a 2012 study found no evidence of ponds or streams on the island. Since the 19th century, the island's natural topography has been modified drastically, and fill has been added to Roosevelt Island to increase its area. An ancient fault line, known as Cameron's Line, runs within the East River between Roosevelt Island and Queens.

Roosevelt Island's street layout is based on a master plan designed in 1969 by the architects Philip Johnson and John Burgee. Main Street runs the length of the island, splitting into a loop around Southtown; it was the island's only road until 1989. The street is paved in red brick. Main Street, along with the island's parks, was intended to be a communal area for the island's various ethnic groups and socioeconomic classes. The island's residences and businesses are largely clustered around Main Street. Roosevelt Island is surrounded by a seawall of Fordham gneiss, quarried from the island itself.

== History ==
=== Early history ===
==== Lenape use ====
According to archaeological digs, the area around Roosevelt Island was settled by Paleo-Indians up to 12,000 years ago. In particular, the area was the homeland of the Mareckawick, a group of Lenape Native Americans, who called it Minnehanonck. The name is variously translated as "long island" or "It's nice to be on the island". The historian Isaac Newton Phelps Stokes claimed that the Minnehanonck name referred to Randalls Island, but this claim has not been corroborated.

The Lenape may have visited the island. Archeological studies have found shell middens just opposite the island, along both the Queens and Manhattan shores, and the Lenape are known to have had settlements around waterways. However, the island likely did not have any Lenape settlements because of the lack of freshwater. There is little evidence of Native American activities on the island from before the Archaic period (which ended around 1000 BCE).

==== Dutch colonization ====
There are disputes over who owned the island after the European colonization of New Netherland in the 17th century. According to several sources, Dutch Governor Wouter van Twiller was said to have purchased the island from the Lenape in 1637. A study from 1988 found that Van Twiller's deed referred to what is now Randalls and Wards Islands further north, but a subsequent study said that Van Twiller acquired Randalls, Wards, Roosevelt, and Governors islands simultaneously. In any case, Roosevelt Island was known in early modern Dutch as Varcken[s], Varken, or Verckens Eylandt, all of which are translated in modern English as Hog Island (Varkens eiland).

By 1639, Jan Claessen Alteras was known to have farmed Hog Island. Reports indicate that Alteras had made improvements to the island by 1642, though the nature of the work is not known. New Netherland director-general Peter Stuyvesant took over the island in 1642. The following year, it was leased to Francois Fyn. Fyn, in turn, leased the island to Laurens Duyts, who developed further structures on the island. Duyts defaulted on his lease in 1658 and was deported for "gross immoralities", and Fyn's lawyer took back the island.

==== Manning and Blackwell ownership ====
After the Dutch surrendered to the British in 1664, a British military captain named John Manning acquired the island in 1668. (Note: Another source gives 1666 as the year of Manning's takeover.) In 1673, Manning surrendered to Dutch forces who had wanted to retake New Netherland; as punishment, he had to live on the island in exile. After Manning's banishment, the isle became known as Manning's Island. Manning had a mansion near the island's southern tip, where he served rum punch to visitors. The island was then conveyed to Manning's stepdaughter Mary in 1676 or 1685. Mary was married to Robert Blackwell, who became the island's new owner and namesake. The Brooklyn Times-Union wrote that the island had gained the Blackwell name "by a mere chance, or the result of a marriage".

The Blackwell family settled the island over four generations. At the beginning of the 18th century, Blackwell built his farmhouse, the Blackwell House, on the island. Blackwell's Island was not a major battleground in the American Revolutionary War, though British troops tried to take the island after the 1776 Battle of Long Island. The British briefly seized control on September 2–4, 1776, after which the American troops took over. A British prison inspector proposed using the island as a prison in the early 1780s, but it is not known whether this happened. Blackwell's sons took over the island in 1780 and tried to sell it, at which point Blackwell's Island had several buildings and was several miles removed from New York City. By the mid-1780s, the island included two houses, orchards, a cider mill, and other farm structures. Contemporary sources do not mention any structures on the northern half of the island. A public auction was held in 1785, but no one bought the island. In 1796, Blackwell's great-grandson Jacob Blackwell constructed the Blackwell House, one of Manhattan's oldest houses. James L. Bell paid the Blackwells $30,000 for the island in 1823, but Blackwell took back control two years later, upon Bell's death. One source indicated that Bell never fulfilled the terms of the sale.

=== Hospital and prison island ===
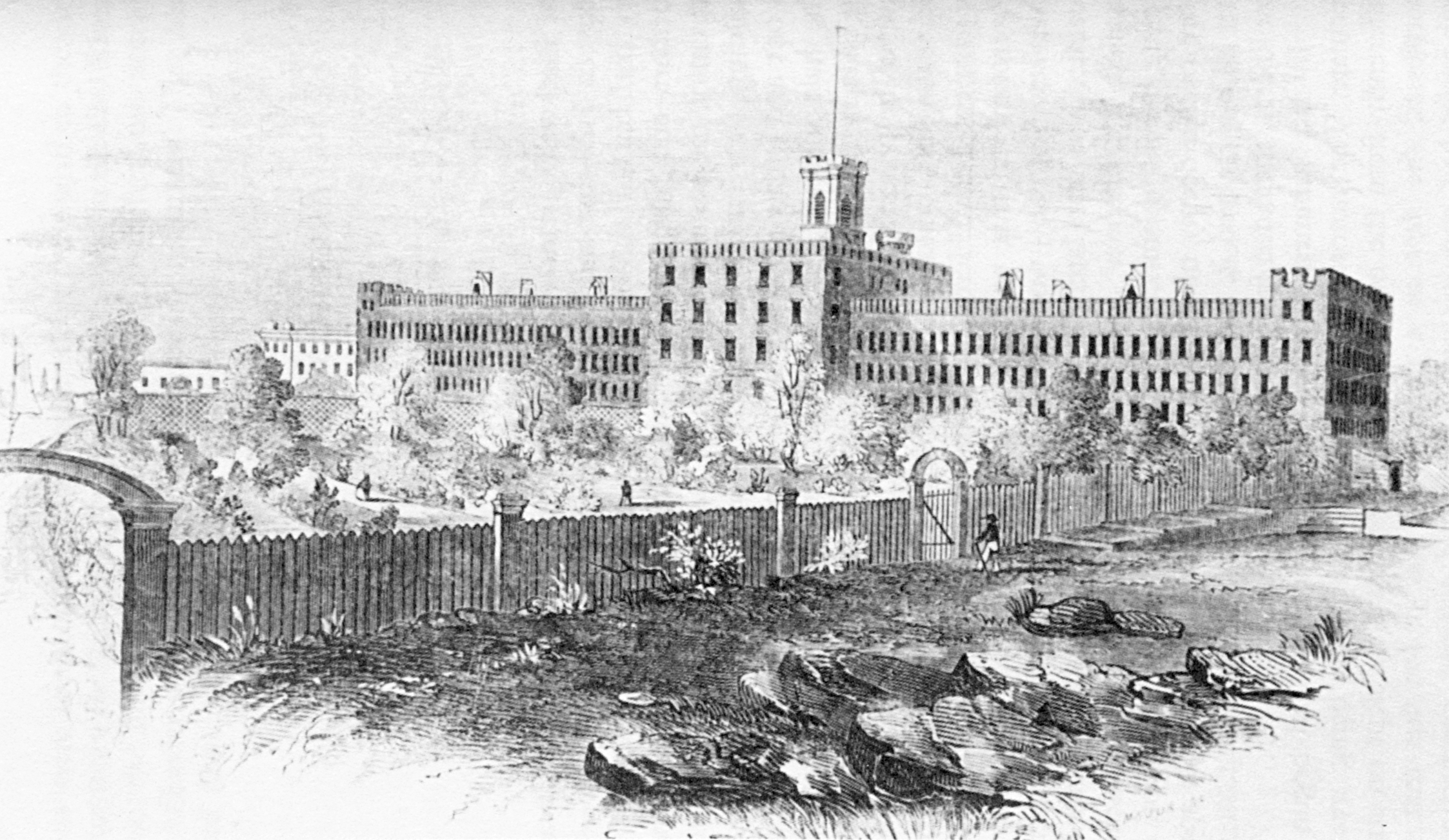
Prison at Blackwell's Island in 1853

By 1826, the city almshouse at Bellevue Hospital was overcrowded, prompting city officials to consider moving that facility to Blackwell's Island. The city government purchased the island for $32,000 (equivalent to $938,182 in 2025) on July 19, 1828. Ownership of the island remained unresolved for another 16 years while Bell's widow sued the city. Through the 19th century, the island housed several hospitals and a prison. At one point there were 26 institutions on the island.

==== 1830s to 1860s ====
The city government erected a penitentiary on the island, which opened August 3, 1830. There were proposals to construct a canal to split male and female prisoners; though the canal was not built, an unknown architect did build a separate building for female prisoners. The island's prison population already numbered in the hundreds by 1838, whereas there were only 24 staff members (including those not assigned to guard duties). By 1839, the New York City Lunatic Asylum opened, including the Octagon Tower. The asylum, with two wings made of locally quarried Fordham gneiss, at one point held 1,700 inmates, twice its designed capacity. Prisoners frequently tried to swim away from the island. Almshouses, or housing for the poor, were constructed in 1847. Other hospitals were soon developed on the island, including a 600-bed prison hospital that was finished in 1849. Thomas Story Kirkbride, who oversaw some of the island's hospitals, described the island as having fallen into "degradation and neglect" by 1848.

A workhouse was built on the island in 1852, followed by the Smallpox Hospital in 1856. The Asylum burned down in 1858 and was rebuilt on the same site, and the prison hospital was destroyed in the same fire. Two pipes provided fresh water from the Croton Aqueduct to the island by 1860, and maps indicate that Blackwell's Island had two reservoirs as well. The prison hospital was replaced with City Hospital (later known as Charity Hospital), which was completed in 1861 and served both prisoners and New York City's poorer population. A "hospital for incurables" followed in 1866.

==== 1870s to 1890s ====
Prisoners built the Blackwell Island Light on the island's northern tip in 1872. In 1877, the hospital opened a School of Nursing, the fourth such training institution in the nation.

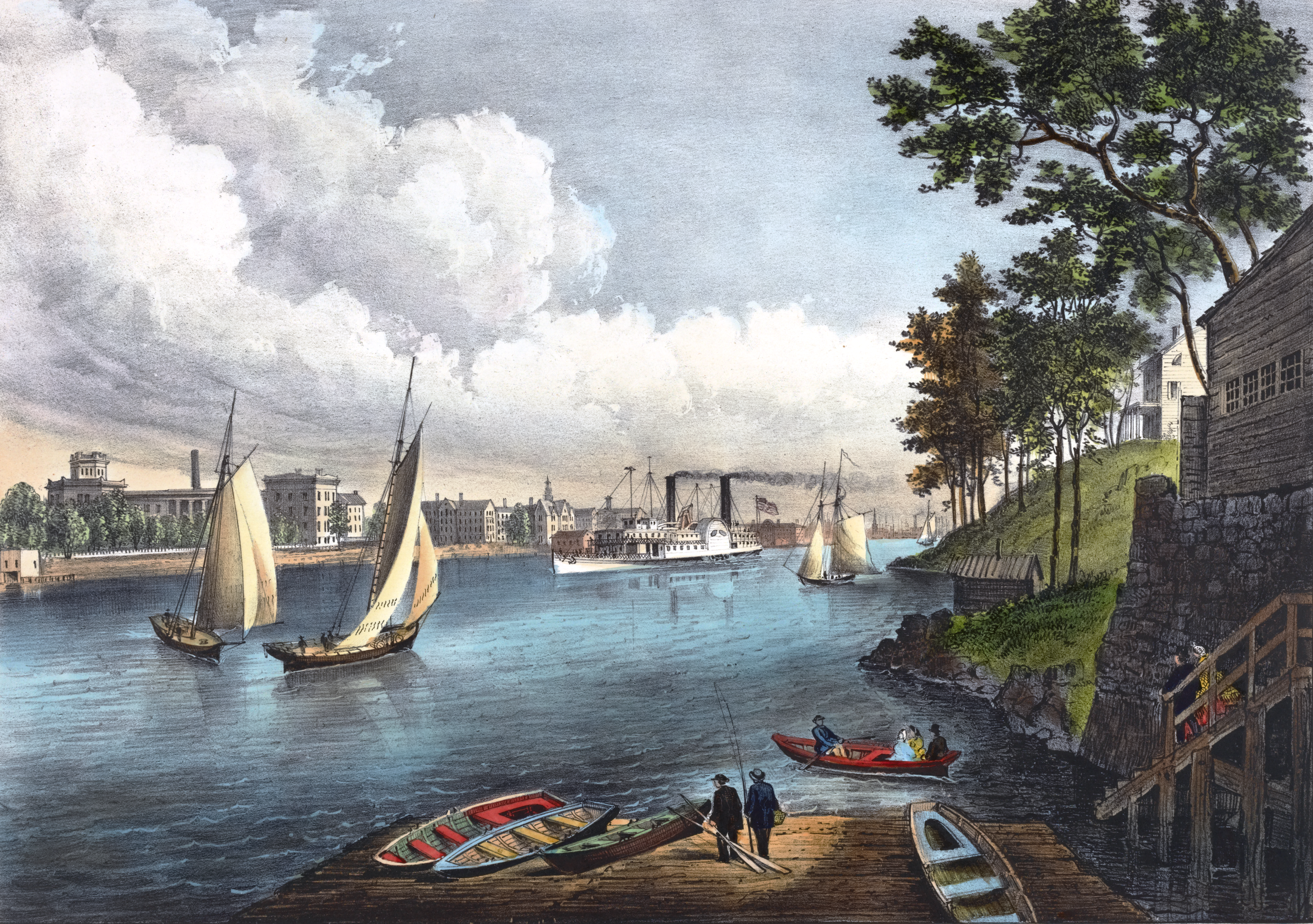
Blackwell Island (now Roosevelt Island) from the East River, c. 1862

Late-19th-century editions of the Appleton's Dictionary of New York described Blackwell's Island's penitentiary as having a "feudal character". Conditions in some of the hospitals declined significantly enough that the island as a whole gained a poor reputation. The women's hospital on the island was completed in 1881. Inmates from the Smallpox Hospital were moved to North Brother Island in 1885, and the Smallpox Hospital building became a nurses' training school and dormitory. In addition, a male nurse's training school opened in 1887 and operated for 16 years. The Chapel of the Good Shepherd opened on the island in 1889.

The Strecker Memorial Laboratory was constructed in 1892 for the City Hospital. The next year, the city began sending typhus patients to the island. During the decade, city officials found the almshouse and City Hospital dilapidated and overcrowded, and a grand jury declared the women's asylum a "disgrace" to New York City. The asylum's inmates were transferred to Wards Island in the mid-1890s, and Wards Island's Homeopathic Hospital relocated to Blackwell's Island, becoming the Metropolitan Hospital. A proposal to build a power plant on the island in 1895 was unsuccessful, and the city began planning to expand the island's prisons the next year. Work began on new structures for the City Hospital and the almshouse in early 1897, and eleven new almshouse buildings opened that October. There were also plans to add eight pavilions to the island's infants' hospital. The prison's hospital burned down in 1899. At the end of the century, the island housed 7,000 people across seven institutions.

==== 1900s and 1910s ====
A 1903 panorama film of the island by Edwin S. Porter

By the 20th century, Blackwell's Island had received the nickname of "Farewell Island" because of its connotations with fear and despair, and it was also known as simply "The Island". At the time, the island contained a poorhouse, the city jail, and several hospitals. The United States Department of the Navy proposed a drill ground and training facility at Blackwell's Island's northern end in 1901, although city officials opposed it. The following year, there was a proposal to turn the island over to the federal government and raze many of the existing structures; the city's controller was also against this plan. Other proposals for the island in the first decade of the 20th century included new tuberculosis (consumptive) hospitals, additional almshouses, an electric power plant, and general hospitals. A tuberculosis ward at Metropolitan Hospital opened on the island in 1902, followed by an expanded nurses' school the next year. By the mid-1900s, the Louisville Courier-Journal called the island "the world's best guarded prison", and the New-York Tribune described the island as unsanitary. The city's controller recommended the construction of a new hospital to alleviate the poor conditions.

A proposal to convert the island into a park resurfaced in 1907. By the end of the decade, thousands of elderly residents voluntarily traveled to the island for "vacations" every year. The island's prisoners manufactured goods for the city, such as beds, brushes, and clothes, and the Russell Sage Foundation set up a short-lived pathology institute on the island in 1907. The Queensboro Bridge, crossing Blackwell's Island, opened in 1909, but it did not provide direct access to the island until the late 1910s. In addition, in the early 1910s, several buildings were added at the island's City and Metropolitan hospitals, and a Catholic chapel was developed on the island. City corrections commissioner Katharine Davis announced plans to construct a prison hospital on the island in 1915; there was very little vacant land on the island by then.

By the 1910s, twenty-five thousand prisoners passed through the island's jail annually, and Mayor William Jay Gaynor proposed shutting the jail. There were also proposals to move the penitentiary to Hart Island, freeing up Blackwell's Island for hospitals and charitable institutions. The city's deputy correction correctioner called the island's penitentiary "unfit for pigs" in a 1914 report criticizing the unsanitary and overcrowded conditions, and a grand jury investigation the same year found that the jail was severely mismanaged. Blackwell's Island Penitentiary was negatively affecting the reputation of the island's other facilities, to the point where a renaming of the island was under discussion. The women's penitentiary underwent reforms during the mid-1910s, and some prisoners were sent off the island to other jails. Bird S. Coler ordered that the island's buildings be refurbished after he became the city's public welfare commissioner in 1918.

==== 1920s and 1930s ====
In 1921, the city began using Blackwell's Penitentiary to detain women who were awaiting trial. The island's prison hospital was severely understaffed, and the prison was described as "a disgrace to the City of New York". That April, the New York City Board of Aldermen renamed Blackwell's Island to Welfare Island. The aldermen hoped the new name would improve the island's reputation, though the United States Board on Geographic Names did not recognize the name change for four decades. The state's prison commission recommended converting the island to a park in 1924, and the city began planning to move Welfare Island's inmates to a new jail complex on Rikers Island further north. By then, the Welfare Island penitentiary lacked plumbing, had rat infestations, and was susceptible to fire. The prison's hospital was so overcrowded that ill inmates had to be treated in their cells. Prison staff were poorly compensated, and the prison received little to no maintenance.

A chapel was dedicated on the island in 1925, followed by a synagogue in 1926. The city government also expanded the island's Cancer Institute in the 1920s. The State Department of Correction described the island in the early 1930s as "absolutely unsuitable for the purpose for which it is now used". The Board of Estimate rezoned the island in 1933 to allow redevelopment. At the time, officials were planning a children's hospital and nurses' dormitory on the island. Municipal prison commissioner Austin MacCormick reformed the island's prison in 1934 following a series of uprisings. By then, the old almshouse (the City Home) was so overcrowded that patients were being housed in abandoned portions of the Lunatic Asylum. Welfare Island's jail was scheduled to be relocated, and city parks commissioner Robert Moses proposed converting the jail site to a public park. A city committee instead recommended a plan by city hospital commissioner S. S. Goldwater, who proposed expanding the island's hospital facilities.

After the Rikers Island jail complex opened, workers demolished the Welfare Island jail, and all inmates had been relocated by February 1936. The city announced plans for a chronic care hospital complex in 1936. When the Welfare Island Hospital for Chronic Diseases, later Goldwater Memorial Hospital, opened in July 1939, the Central and Neurological Hospital closed. An eight-building camp also opened in 1939.

==== 1940s to 1960s ====
During the mid-1940s, plans were filed for a combined laundry, garage, and firehouse building; a hospital at Welfare Island's northern tip; a nurses' training school; and a chronic-disease ward at the Metropolitan Hospital. A girls' shelter on the island opened in late 1945. By the late 1940s, mayor William O'Dwyer described conditions at some of the island's hospitals as "frightful", mainly because of their age. A chronic-care hospital and a laundry building were developed on Welfare Island during that era. The laundry building began construction in 1948 and was completed the next year. Work on a 2,000-bed facility, later known as the Bird S. Coler Hospital, also began in 1948. Further projects were proposed in the late 1940s, including the Welfare Island Bridge to Queens, a laboratory for Goldwater Hospital, and two hospitals with a combined 1,500 beds. The bridge was intended to relieve traffic caused by the island's new hospitals, while the additional hospitals would serve the city's growing elderly population.

During the early 1950s, the city planned a 1,500-bed hospital on the island and wished to convert the island's Cancer Institute into a tuberculosis hospital. After Coler Hospital opened in 1952, patients were relocated there from the City Home for Dependents. City Home was emptied out by 1953. The Welfare Island Bridge opened in May 1955, and a bus began serving the island. The Metropolitan Hospital moved to mainland Manhattan later that year, while the City Hospital was replaced in 1957 by Elmhurst Hospital Center in Queens. Several medical facilities on the island opened during the mid-1950s, including an elderly rehabilitation center at Goldwater Hospital, a polio treatment center at Goldwater, and a children's rehabilitation center at Coler Hospital. There were also proposals to establish a "fire college" and a women's jail on the island. Another medical facility for chronically ill and elderly patients opened on Welfare Island in 1958.

By 1960, half of Welfare Island was abandoned, and the Goldwater and Bird S. Coler hospitals were the only remaining institutions there. The city government had been trying since 1957, without success, to obtain $1 million to demolish the abandoned buildings. The New York City Fire Department (FDNY) opened a training school in 1962, using 90 abandoned buildings for training purposes. One reporter in 1967 called Welfare Island a "ghost town, vacant lot, woodland and mausoleum for unhappy memories".

=== Redevelopment plans ===
==== Early- and mid-1960s proposals ====
The businessman and politician Frederick W. Richmond announced a proposal in 1961 to redevelop the island with residences for 70,000 people. The plan would have cost $450 million and would have included a two-level platform supporting buildings as tall as 50 stories. The American Institute of Architects' New York chapter proposed that the island instead become a park, while yet another plan called for the island to become housing for United Nations staff. Other plans included those for a college campus or a smaller-scale residential area. A New York City Subway station on Welfare Island was announced in February 1965 as part of the new 63rd Street lines under the East River; the subway announcement spurred additional plans for the island's redevelopment. There were plans to rename Welfare Island because the public generally associated the name negatively with the island's hospitals, and even the hospital's patients wanted the island to be renamed.

The city government ordered the demolition of six dilapidated buildings on the island in 1965. The city took over another 45 abandoned hospital buildings via condemnation in June 1966, and the New York City Board of Estimate applied for $250,000 in federal funds for a feasibility study on the island's redevelopment later that year. The New York state government proposed in December 1967 to convert most of the island into a public park, except for senior citizens' housing at the north end. The United Nations International School considered developing a campus at the island's southern end, and the New York Board of Trade pushed to redevelop the island as a city park. Other plans included a mix of recreational facilities and low-density housing; an amusement park similar to Tivoli Gardens in Copenhagen; an underground nuclear power plant; a cemetery; and a "city of the future".

==== Johnson and Burgee plan ====
In February 1968, mayor John V. Lindsay named a committee to make recommendations for the island's development, at which point one newspaper called it "the most expensive wasteland in the world". The state government established the Welfare Island Development Corporation (WIDC; later the Roosevelt Island Development Corporation or RIDC) that April. Early the next year, the state government canceled plans for a state park encompassing Welfare Island, and Lindsay's committee recommended renaming the island and developing housing units and recreational facilities there. Land clearing began that April, and Lindsay asked the New York State Urban Development Corporation (UDC) to help redevelop the island in May. The city and state governments formally presented their proposal for Welfare Island in October 1969. After the Board of Estimate approved the plan later that month, the UDC signed a 99-year lease with the city that December. The city could pay either two percent of the development cost or 40 percent of any profits. The UDC issued $250 million in bonds to help finance the project. The state hoped to finish the project within eight years.

The architects Philip Johnson and John Burgee designed the master plan for Welfare Island, which called for two neighborhoods named Northtown and Southtown, separated by a common area. The island was to become a car-free area with apartments, stores, community centers, and a waterfront promenade. The apartments ranged in size from studios to four-bedroom units and were a mixture of rental and cooperative units. There would be a hotel, public schools, stores, and office space, and several existing buildings would be retained. Services such as parks and schools were near every residence, and there was a pneumatic trash collection system. The first apartment buildings banned dogs, but this prohibition was not applied to buildings developed later. Additionally, the hospitals on the island still needed vehicular access, so the car ban was ultimately repealed.

By the early 1970s, the families of Welfare Island's three chaplains were the only people living on the island, excluding hospital patients. Models of Johnson and Burgee's proposal were exhibited at the Metropolitan Museum of Art in late 1970. The UDC modified some of Johnson and Burgee's designs after they were publicized; for example, it added more buildings on the waterfront. The redevelopment attracted residents who wanted a better quality of life. Critics expressed concerns about the fact that lower- and upper-income residents were placed on opposite sides of Main Street, and they also questioned whether the project's $400 million construction budget could have been spent on other projects.

=== Redevelopment ===
==== Renaming and development of Northtown ====
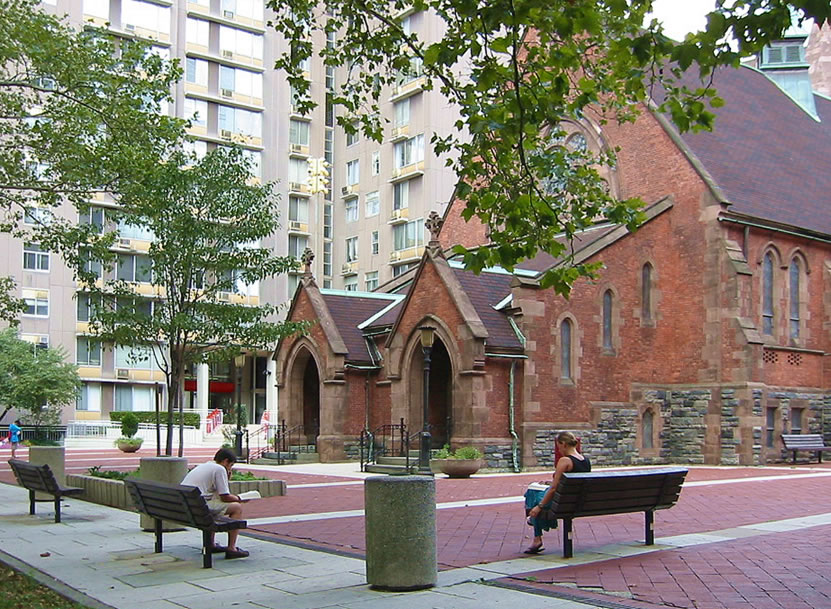
The 1889 Chapel of the Good Shepherd in modern surroundings

The first phase of the development, Northtown, was to accommodate about 2,100 families. The law professor Adam Yarmolinsky was hired to lead the WIDC in late 1970, but he resigned after just over a year. Work formally began in mid-1971, and the state approved the construction of the first buildings the same year. The UDC hired at least 17 architectural and engineering companies to design the structures, though many of the architects resigned during construction. The WIDC approved a proposal for 1,100 middle-income and luxury apartments in April 1972; the UDC decided to build the residences as housing cooperatives after unsuccessfully looking for a private developer. The United States Department of Housing and Urban Development formally designated Welfare Island as a "new town" in December 1972, making it eligible for additional funds.

UDC considered renaming the island to attract new residents; the Four Freedoms Foundation proposed renaming it for U.S. president Franklin D. Roosevelt. The City Council approved the name change in July 1973, and Welfare Island was renamed Roosevelt Island on August 20, 1973. Officials began planning the Franklin D. Roosevelt Four Freedoms Park as well; although the island had been renamed in anticipation of the park's construction, the project was delayed for the next several decades. By the middle of 1973, one building had topped out, and the island had been expanded by 4 acres (1.6 ha) using dirt from the 63rd Street Tunnel's construction. UDC head Edward J. Logue and project manager Robert Litke convinced multiple developers to sign 40-year leases for buildings on the island. Parts of the project were delayed by disputes over the relocation of a laundry building. By the end of the year, an advisory group recommended that the state legislature halt all UDC financing for the unbuilt phases of the Roosevelt Island development, citing the state's financial shortfalls. At least one of the residential structures' builders had also gone bankrupt. Construction proceeded steadily through 1974, and renting began that October. In addition, the existing Blackwell House and Chapel of the Good Shepherd were renovated.

After Logue was fired in early 1975, there was uncertainty over whether additional buildings would ever be built, especially given the UDC's financial troubles. The UDC decided to complete the first phase of the island's development, on which it had already spent $180 million, and the New York State Division of Housing and Community Renewal took over the UDC's residential developments, including Roosevelt Island. Following an architectural design competition, the UDC hired four architecture firms to design the second phase of Northtown that year. Residents began moving into Roosevelt Island's first building in April 1975. Initially, there were no stores on the island, and residents had to pass through Queens to go anywhere else. Although people were not incentivized to move to Roosevelt Island because of the lack of public transportation, the island was home to 170 families by the end of 1975. The first four buildings in Northtown were all completed by mid-1976, while the storefronts were slowly being rented.

==== Development of Northtown II ====
No new buildings were completed between 1976 and 1989, due to delays in the subway line's opening and the city's financial troubles. The Roosevelt Island Tramway to Manhattan opened in May 1976, and the U.S. government provided a grant the same year to fund the construction of parks on the island. Rivercross, the only cooperative apartment building in Northtown, generally attracted upper-class families because of its high monthly fees, while the other buildings attracted middle-class residents. The FDNY training school moved to Randalls Island in 1977, and the old Roosevelt Island campus was razed. There were over 3,000 residents by early 1977 and 5,500 residents by 1978. Two-thirds of the island's storefronts were still empty by the end of 1977, even as almost all of the rental apartments and most of the cooperative apartments were occupied. The UDC leased some land in late 1977 to the Starrett Corporation, which planned to erect three additional buildings with a combined 1,000 apartments. Starrett and the UDC signed an agreement in June 1979, in which Starrett agreed to build the three buildings, collectively known as Northtown II, for $82 million.

New York state comptroller Edward V. Regan published a report in 1980, saying that the Roosevelt Island redevelopment suffered from severe cost overruns and was losing money. Starrett continued to modify its plans for Northtown II, and, by 1982, the New York state government planned to begin developing Northtown II. The opening of the subway, which would support the island's increasing population, had been repeatedly delayed, even as residents expressed concerns that the subway would cause the island's low crime rate to increase. By then, the island had 5,000 residents and 1,800 hospital patients, but relatively few businesses. The state legislature created the Roosevelt Island Operating Corporation (RIOC) to operate the island in 1984.

The UDC re-approved the Northtown II plan in July 1984, and RIOC approved it in 1986. The revised plans called for five buildings, containing a total of 1,100 apartments. Opponents of the Northtown II project wanted to maintain the island's character and expressed concerns about the lack of mass transit options; following a lawsuit to block Northtown II, a judge approved it in late 1986. Work on Northtown II commenced at the end of 1987, financed by a $176 million mortgage loan from the city. The Northtown II towers, known as Manhattan Park, opened in 1989. While the new apartments initially sold at a slower-than-expected pace, Northtown II was 70 percent occupied by early 1990.

==== 1990s developments ====
The opening of the Roosevelt Island subway station, in late 1989, allowed further development to proceed. Officials announced the Southtown development in October 1989. Designed by Raquel Ramati Associates, it was to consist of 1,956 apartments, split evenly between market-rate and affordable apartments. The development would span 19 acres (7.7 ha) and house up to 5,000 people. The New York City Board of Estimate approved plans for Southtown in August 1990, but the project had been placed on hold by 1991 because RIOC had not been able to secure a developer. For much of the 1990s, no large buildings were completed on Roosevelt Island.

In part because of the lack of development, the island's population remained lower than expected, requiring it to be subsidized. By the mid-1990s, the island had 8,200 residents, less than half the 20,000 that the state government had originally envisioned, and there were around 20 small stores. To attract visitors, RIOC developed several recreational facilities and parks and sought to restore the island's oldest buildings. RIOC also planned to remove about 1 acre (0.40 ha) of land to make way for a seawall. The architect Santiago Calatrava was hired to design a visitor center in the 1990s, but this was never built.

RIOC proposed selling off the Southtown site in 1997, and the Related Companies and Hudson Companies signed an agreement to develop Southtown. The plans for Southtown were subsequently redrawn; the revised plan called for three buildings to the east of Main Street, six buildings to the west, and new recreational fields. Southtown's development also entailed reducing the size of the existing Blackwell Park, which prompted opposition from Northtown residents who used the park. A 26-story hotel with a convention center was proposed on the island in 1998, though this plan was controversial. There was also growing discontent with RIOC. As a result, mayor Rudy Giuliani proposed having the city take over the island in 1999, and state legislator Pete Grannis also proposed legislation to allow the island to govern itself. A contractor was hired to build the first section of Southtown in May 1999, and Memorial Sloan Kettering Cancer Center indicated that it would build a tower in Southtown to house its staff.

==== 2000s to present ====
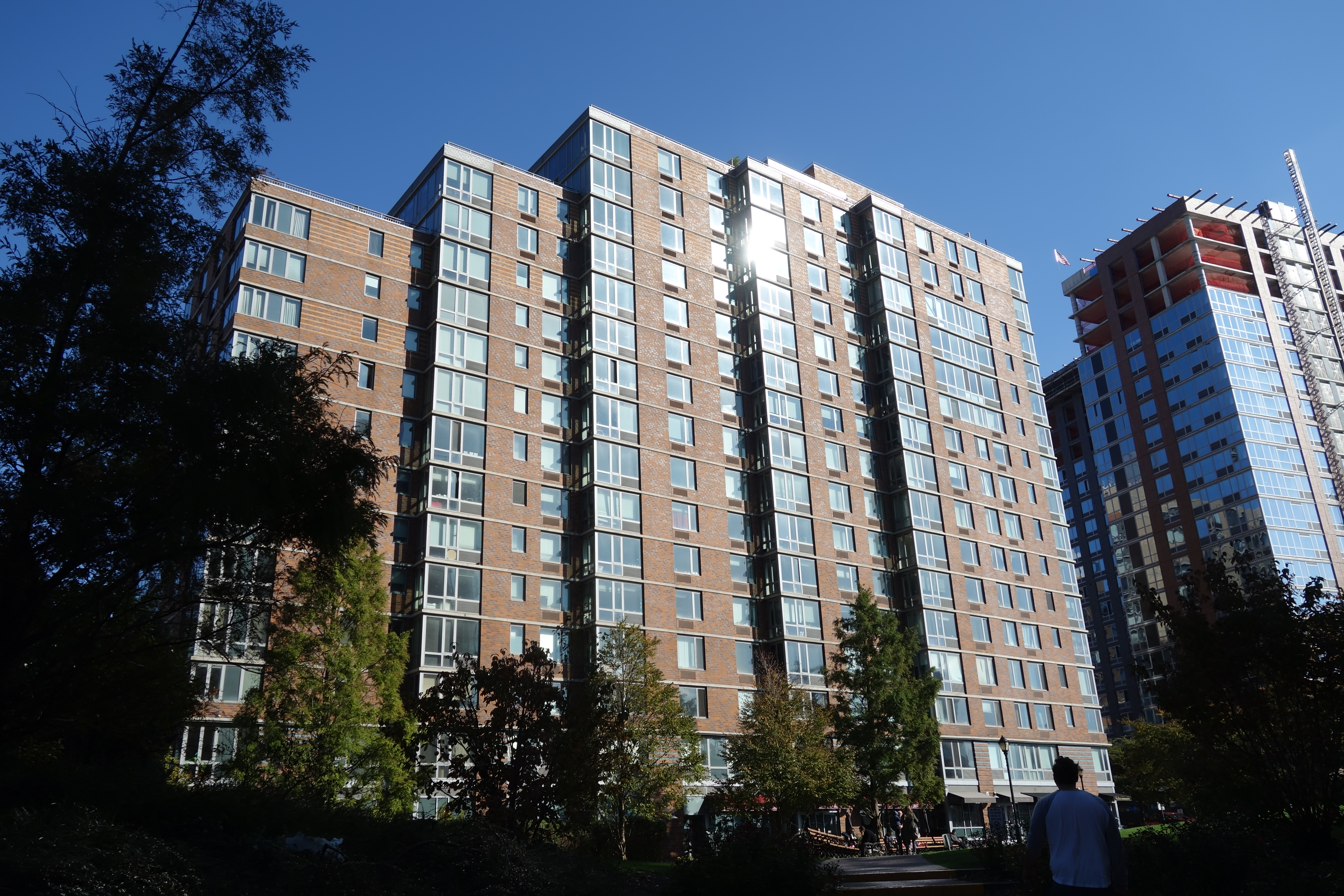
One of the Southtown (Riverwalk) buildings

By the 2000 United States census, Roosevelt Island had a population of 9,520. Some of the island's original buildings, which were part of the Mitchell–Lama affordable housing program, were planned to be converted to market-rate housing during the time. Southtown's first buildings, including two structures for medical workers were announced in early 2001. The first two Southtown buildings were completed in 2002, and a proposal to redevelop the Octagon tower as an apartment building was announced that year. The largely inaccessible Southpoint Park was opened year-round in 2003, a year after Governor George Pataki signed legislation designating several parks on the island. The island's first two condominium buildings, both in Southtown, and the Octagon were developed next. All three structures had been completed by 2007, increasing the island's population to around 12,000. Southtown's fifth and sixth buildings were completed by 2008. By the late 2000s, there were long waiting lists for residences on the island, and people quickly moved into the new residential buildings. Although the Roosevelt Island Residents Association expressed concerns that the new developments would cause gentrification, the island largely retained its middle-class housing stock.

Work commenced on Four Freedoms Park in 2009, along with a redesign of Southpoint Park. Southpoint Park reopened in 2011, and Four Freedoms Park was finished the next year. A RIOC survey from 2010 found that only 12 percent of residents shopped on the island, and RIOC leased the island's largely vacant retail space to the Related Companies and Hudson Companies the next year. Related and Hudson renovated 33 storefronts, while RIOC waived food-truck permit fees to entice food vendors. The city government selected Technion – Israel Institute of Technology and Cornell University in late 2011 to develop the Cornell Tech research center on the island; the proposal included three towers, a hotel, and a conference center. The campus replaced the outmoded Goldwater Memorial Hospital, which closed in 2013. Work on Cornell Tech itself began in 2015, and the campus opened two years later. Graduate students moved to the island after Cornell Tech opened.

Meanwhile, the island's population had grown to 11,661 by the 2010 United States census. Some of the Mitchell–Lama apartments were converted to market-rate housing in the 2010s, while development of additional residential structures continued. The seventh Riverwalk building was finished in 2015, followed by the eighth in 2019. Firefighters Field was renovated with the development of the eighth Riverwalk building. To attract visitors, RIOC announced in 2018 that it would create an "art trail" around the island. RIOC began soliciting plans for a memorial to the journalist Nellie Bly in 2019; it ultimately commissioned The Girl Puzzle monument by Amanda Matthews, which was dedicated in December 2021. There was an additional influx of residents during the COVID-19 pandemic in New York City, particularly among those looking for open space. The final building in Southtown, Riverwalk 9, began construction in November 2022 and topped out the next year. In March 2024, plans were announced for a 2,700-square-foot (250 m^{2}) "healing forest" at the southern end of the island. The last building in the Riverwalk development, Riverwalk Heights, was completed in 2024, adding 357 units to Roosevelt Island. In 2025, the RIOC extended its lease of Roosevelt Island to 2078.

== Demographics ==
When the first residential buildings opened, Roosevelt Island's amenities and wheelchair accessibility made it attractive to disabled residents and families with children. Many of the first residents were white, middle-income families, and disabled patients from the island's hospitals moved into the apartments as well. The island also attracted residents who wanted to live in a racially integrated neighborhood, as well as those who wanted to avoid housing discrimination in other areas.

Due to its proximity to the headquarters of the United Nations, Roosevelt Island attracted UN employees almost as soon as the first building opened. A New York Times article from 1999 described Roosevelt Island's diverse demographics as being another factor in its popularity among diplomatic staff. The island has been home to many diplomatic staff over the years, including Kofi Annan when he was United Nations Secretary General. One of every three Roosevelt Island residents was foreign-born by 2000.

The 2020 United States census showed that Roosevelt Island had a population of 11,722, across three census tracts. The racial makeup of Roosevelt Island's three census tracts was 36.3% (4,251) White, 10.6% (1,237) African American, 33.2% (3,897) Asian, 2.8% (333) from other races, and 4.8% (564) from two or more races. Hispanic or Latino residents of any race were 12.3% (1,440) of the population. In the 2020 census data from the New York City Department of City Planning, Roosevelt Island is grouped as part of the Upper East Side-Lenox Hill-Roosevelt Island neighborhood tabulation area. The neighborhood tabulation area had 59,200 residents.

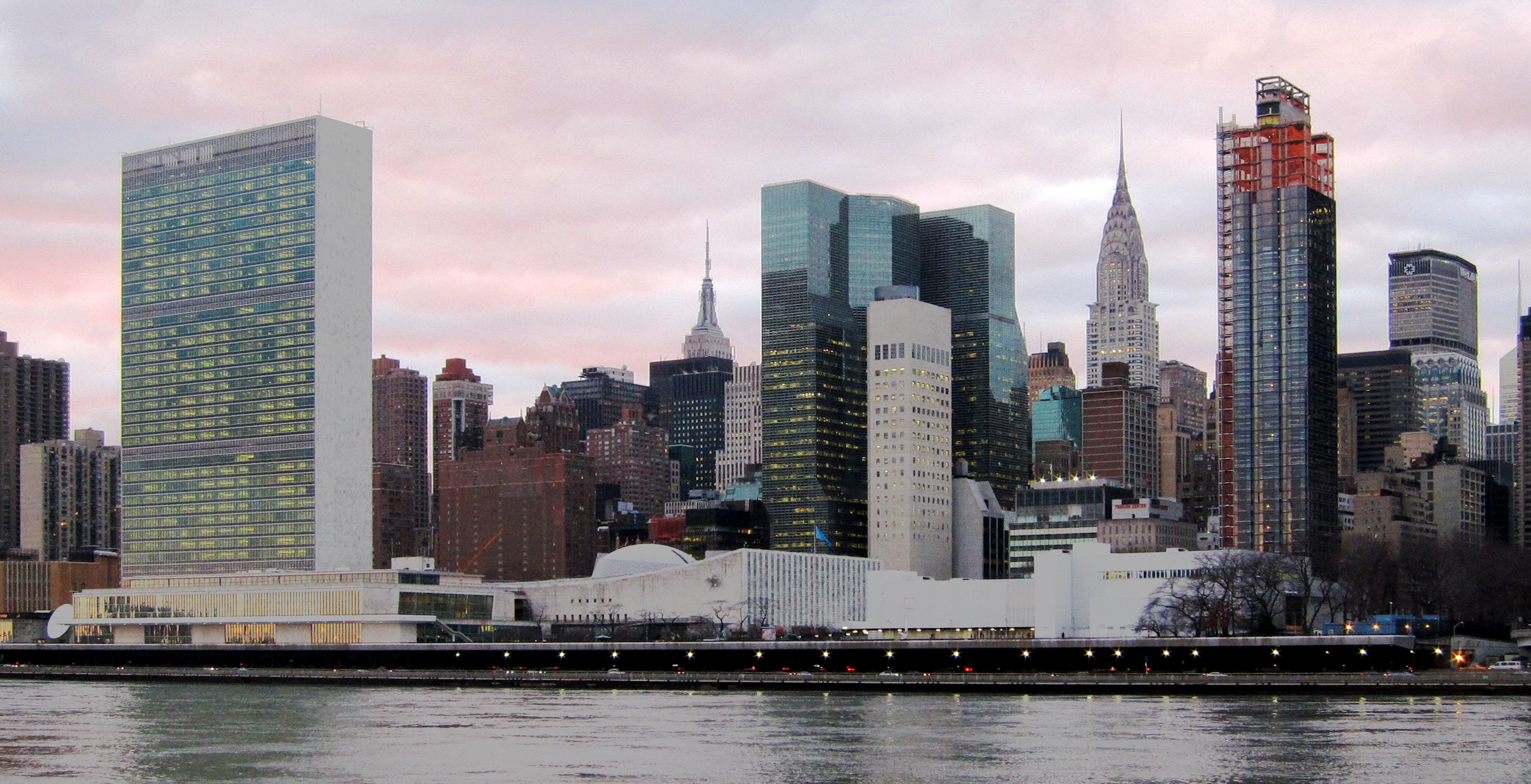
The Headquarters of the United Nations as seen from Roosevelt Island

== Community ==
Roosevelt Island's redevelopment in the 1970s spurred the creation of a community distinct from the rest of Manhattan. Following Northtown's completion, an architectural critic wrote for Architectural Design that Roosevelt Island "seems to be more of a hermetically sealed suburb than an integral part of New York City". One newspaper from 1989 described the island as a "small, self-contained, family-oriented community", with its own Little League Baseball team, newspaper, and library. A Washington Post article from the same year described the island as having the feel of a small town but with a closer connection to Manhattan. A New York Times article from 1999 said the island had the feel of "a postwar suburb of some European city", distinct from the rest of New York City. In 2008, the New York Daily News described the island as a "fantastic and peaceful place to live", albeit with many disputes among residents.

Over the years, several dozen volunteer groups have been developed on the island. These include the Roosevelt Island Garden Club, which consists of 120 plots tended by members. There is also a farmer's market. in addition to organizations such as the Roosevelt Island Visual Art Association and the Main Street Theatre & Dance Alliance. A historical society, the Roosevelt Island Historical Society, has archival material about the island's history. The island has a biweekly newspaper, The Main Street Wire, which was founded in 1981; it originally had a column with pieces about the history of Roosevelt Island.

There have been community traditions on Roosevelt Island, such as Halloween parades, Black History Month events, and Lunar New Year celebrations. Various activities take place on the island throughout the year, such as picnics and concerts, in addition to annual Roosevelt Island Day celebrations since 1995. The island has also hosted events like the Roosevelt Island Table Tennis Tournament and the Figment NYC festival. Every summer since 2015, the Manhattan Park Pool Club has commissioned a mural for the Manhattan Park development's pool deck. Roosevelt Island has sometimes been used as a filming location, such as for the films Spider-Man (2002) and Dark Water (2005).

== Buildings ==
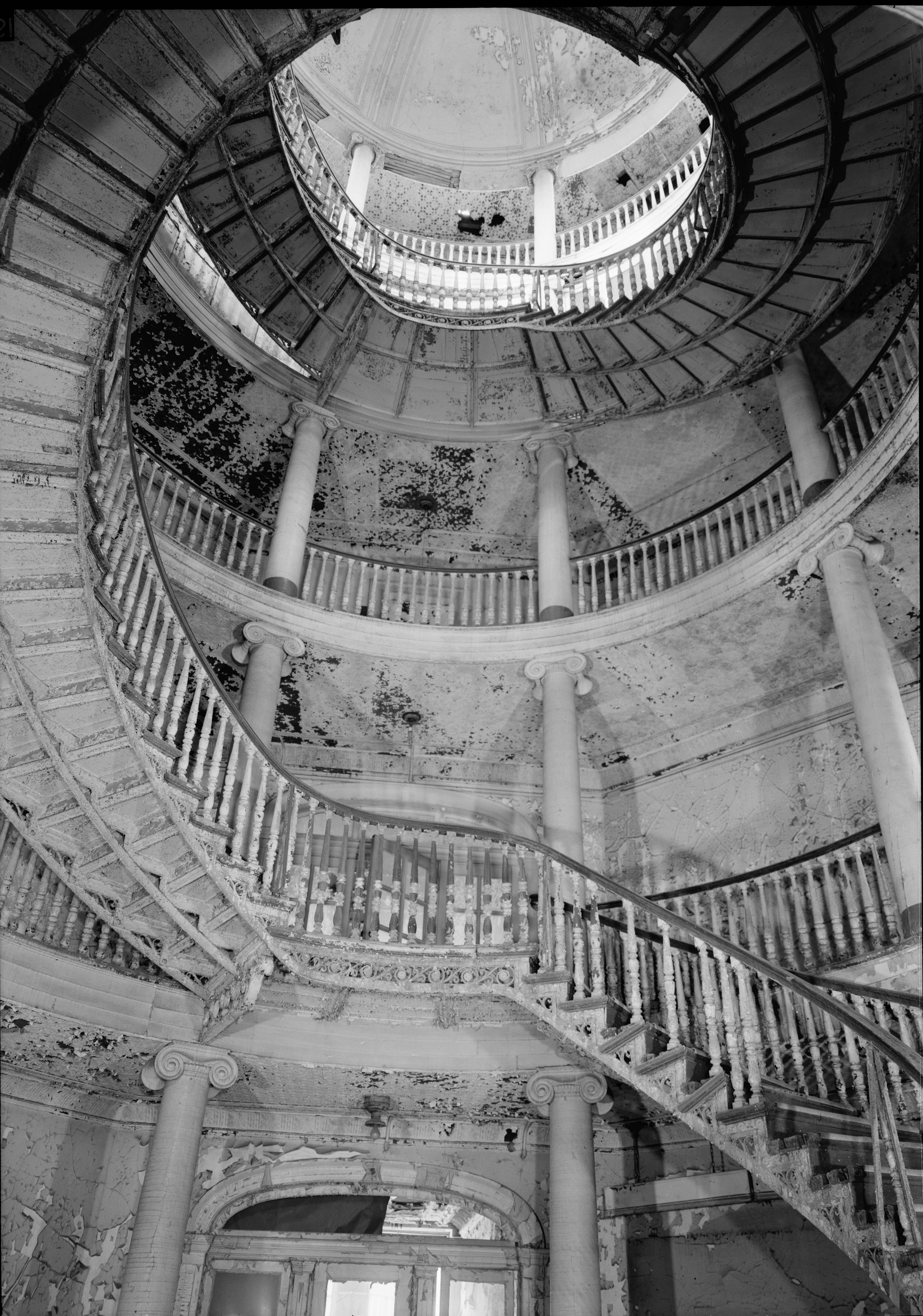
The Octagon interior, mid 20th century

The 1969 master plan divided the island into two residential communities: Northtown and Southtown. The plan received mixed reviews. A writer for New York magazine wrote that the Johnson–Burgee design was "a nice plan for a very nice community", while an Architectural Forum reviewer called it "purposefully schematic and architecturally nonspecific". The Wall Street Journal wrote of the buildings on the island: "Their physical surfaces are harsh but the streetscapes aren't." In 1977, the City Club of New York gave Roosevelt Island's buildings a special honor award for the quality of their designs. Although most of the residential structures contain rental apartments, there are also condominiums and cooperative housing. Roosevelt Island generally has more wheelchair-accessible housing than other neighborhoods, in part because of its past use as a hospital island.

=== Northtown ===
The first phase of Roosevelt Island's development was called Northtown, with about 2,140 apartments. Northtown consists of four housing complexes: Westview, Island House, Rivercross, and Eastwood. The architectural firm of Sert, Jackson & Associates designed the Rivercross, Island House, and Westview buildings west of Main Street, while John Johansen and Ashok Bhavnani designed the Eastwood building on the east side. All four structures are U-shaped buildings, which measure up to 20 stories high and are faced in concrete or corrugated brick. Three of the buildings were rental apartment complexes: Island House, Westview, and Eastwood (the latter of which had affordable housing). Rivercross was structured as a housing cooperative. All of these buildings, except Rivercross, were originally subsidized under the state's Mitchell–Lama Housing Program. The first apartments included built-in heating and air-conditioning units, while the buildings themselves included health clubs. Eastwood also had skip-stop elevators that stopped at three-floor intervals; this allowed for more flexible apartment layouts on floors that were not served by elevators.

Northtown II (also known as Manhattan Park), located north of Northtown and on the west side of Main Street, was developed by the Starrett Corporation and designed by the firm Gruzen Samton. Completed in 1989, it occupies 8.5 acres (3.4 ha) and consists of five buildings. The complex comprises around 1,100 rental apartments, split into about 220 affordable apartments and about 880 market-rate apartments. The affordable apartments are clustered within one building. In all five structures, the apartments range from one to three bedrooms. There are also a garden, picnic space, community center, playgrounds, and daycare center. Near the north end of the island is a 500-unit apartment building known as the Octagon, which is centered around a remaining portion of the Lunatic Asylum.

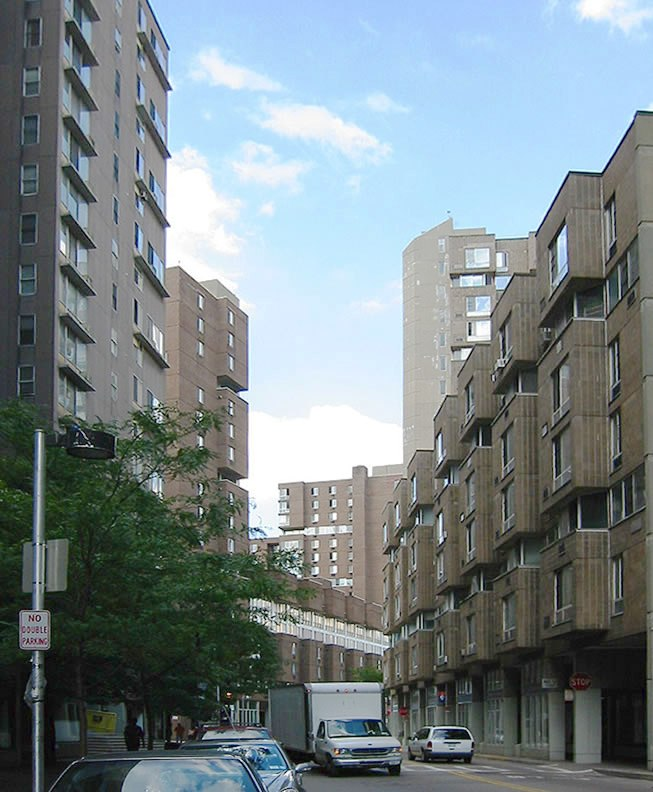
Main Street on Roosevelt Island

In addition to the apartment buildings, the northern part of Roosevelt Island contains the Metropolitan Hospital's former church, which was built in the 1920s and became a wedding venue in 2021. A stone structure, Chapel of St. Dennis, was built near the Octagon around 1935–1940; little else is known about this chapel.

=== Southtown and southern end ===
Southtown (also referred to as Riverwalk) was developed starting in 2001. When complete, Southtown will have 2,000 units in nine buildings. As of 2022, eight of Southtown's nine planned buildings had been completed, while the last structure was under construction. Some of the buildings house medical staff who work in Manhattan. The structures contain a total of over 2,000 apartments, of which 40 percent are affordable housing. Some of the buildings in Southtown are condominiums, including Riverwalk Place and Riverwalk Court. In contrast to the older Northtown buildings, which were developed in groups, the Riverwalk structures were constructed as standalone buildings; the Wall Street Journal regarded Southtown as lacking the "coherent streetscapes" of Northtown.

The southern end of the island also contains four buildings, which are part of the Cornell Tech graduate-school campus and research center. The $2 billion facility includes 2 million square feet of space on an 11-acre (4.5 ha) site. The first phase of the campus includes a main academic building, a graduate housing tower, and an innovation hub/tech incubator. The 26-story Cornell Tech residential tower has 350 apartments and was intended as the world's largest passive house residential tower when it was built. Cornell Tech's first phase also includes a conference center and a hotel. The hotel is 18 stories high, with 224 rooms, and is known as the Graduate Roosevelt Island; it opened in 2021 as the island's first hotel.

=== Designated landmarks ===
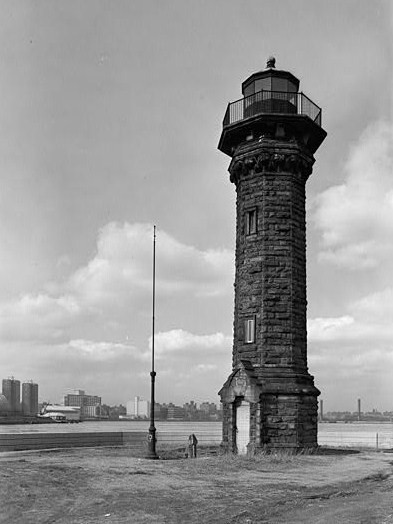
Roosevelt Island Lighthouse in 1970

Roosevelt Island has six buildings and structures that are New York City designated landmarks, all of which are also on the National Register of Historic Places (NRHP). (Note: The Queensboro Bridge, which crosses the island, is als a city landmark and iso listed on the NRHP.) The Blackwell House at Main Street, one of the city's few remaining farmhouses, was built between 1796 and 1804 for James Blackwell. Also along Main Street is the Chapel of the Good Shepherd, an Episcopal church from 1889. Blackwell Island Light, an octagonal Gothic-style lighthouse at the northern end of the island, was built in 1872; it measures 50 feet (15 m) tall and was designed by Renwick.

The remaining three official city landmarks are former hospitals. At the island's southern tip are the Smallpox Hospital, a Gothic-style ruin built in 1857 as the first smallpox hospital in the U.S., and the Strecker Laboratory, a Romanesque Revival-style electrical substation built in 1892 as a laboratory. At the northern end is the Octagon, the sole remaining structure from the 1839 Lunatic Asylum. The ruins of the City Hospital, a mid-19th-century building on the southern tip of the island, had been listed on the NRHP, but were razed in 1994 due to extreme neglect.

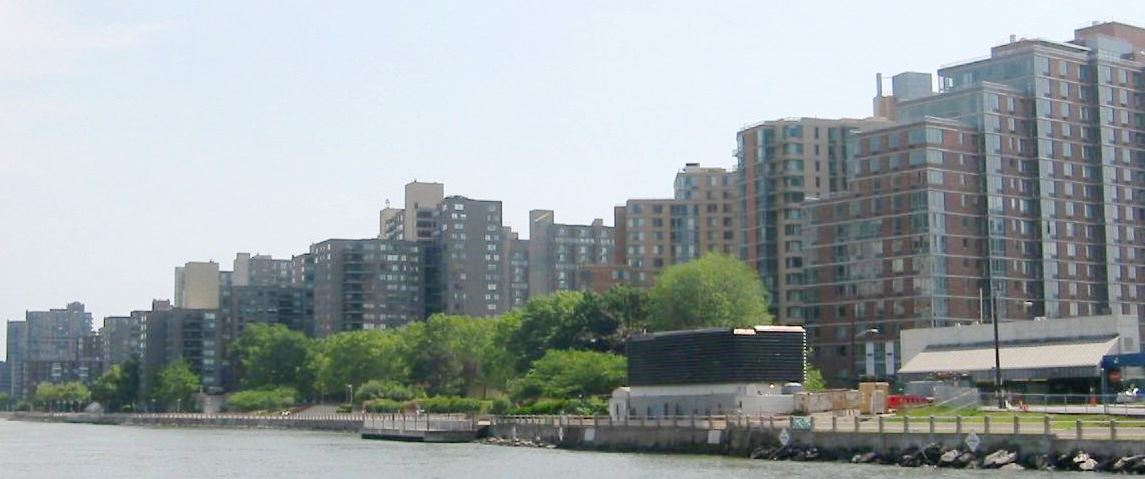
Roosevelt Island buildings

== Governance and infrastructure ==
The neighborhood is part of Manhattan Community District 8. In the 1970s, when the city's community districts were being redrawn, there were disputes over whether the island should be served by a district in Manhattan or Queens. While the island was ultimately placed within a Manhattan community district, it received emergency services from Queens. The island's other services come from Manhattan; for example, it was still assigned a ZIP Code and an area code from Manhattan. The island has a ZIP Code of 10044, and residents are assigned area codes 212, 332, 646, (Note: The area codes 646 and 332 are overlays of the original 212 area code, which serves Manhattan.) and 917. The United States Postal Service operates the Roosevelt Island Station at 694 Main Street; the island's post office opened in October 1976. The firm of Kallman and McKinnell designed the post office, along with a small fire station and a set of stores.

The Roosevelt Island Operating Corporation, a state public-benefit corporation, operates the island's infrastructure and oversees its development. RIOC manages transportation and private security on the island, and it is also responsible for leasing out stores, developing apartments, and preserving the island's landmarked buildings. Although RIOC is a state agency, its members are appointed rather than elected, though straw polls for positions on RIOC's board were hosted starting in 2008. By law, five of RIOC's nine members must be island residents, but not RIOC's CEO. Much of RIOC's income comes from fees collected from private developers.

=== Utilities ===
Gas is supplied via the Ravenswood Tunnel, which runs under the island and was completed in 1894. Parts of New York City Water Tunnel No. 3, which provides fresh water to much of New York City, pass underneath the island; the section under Roosevelt Island opened in 1998 and travels as much as 780 feet (240 m) under the island. Roosevelt Island also had its own steam plant behind the Roosevelt Island Tramway's terminal until 2013. In addition, Verdant Power installed tidal turbines under the East River's eastern channel in the 2000s as part of the Roosevelt Island Tidal Energy project; The turbines powered small parts of the island. Three new turbines were installed in the 2020s.

==== Waste disposal ====
Before the 1970s, raw waste from Roosevelt Island was dumped directly into the East River. Garbage on Roosevelt Island is collected by an automated vacuum collection (AVAC) system, which consists of pneumatic tubes measuring either 20 inches (510 mm), 22 inches (56 cm), or 24 inches (61 cm) wide. Manufactured by Swedish firm Envac and installed in 1975, it was the second AVAC system in the U.S. at the time of its installation, after the Disney utilidor system. It is one of the world's largest AVAC systems, collecting trash from 16 residential towers. Trash from each tower is transported to the Central Collections and Compaction Plant at up to 60 miles per hour (97 km/h). The collection facility contains three turbines that spin the garbage; the trash is then compacted and sent to a landfill. The pneumatic tube system collects 6 short tons (5.4 t) or 10 short tons (9.1 t) of trash each day. On several occasions, tenants have damaged the system by throwing large objects, such as strollers and Christmas trees, into the tubes.

=== Emergency services ===
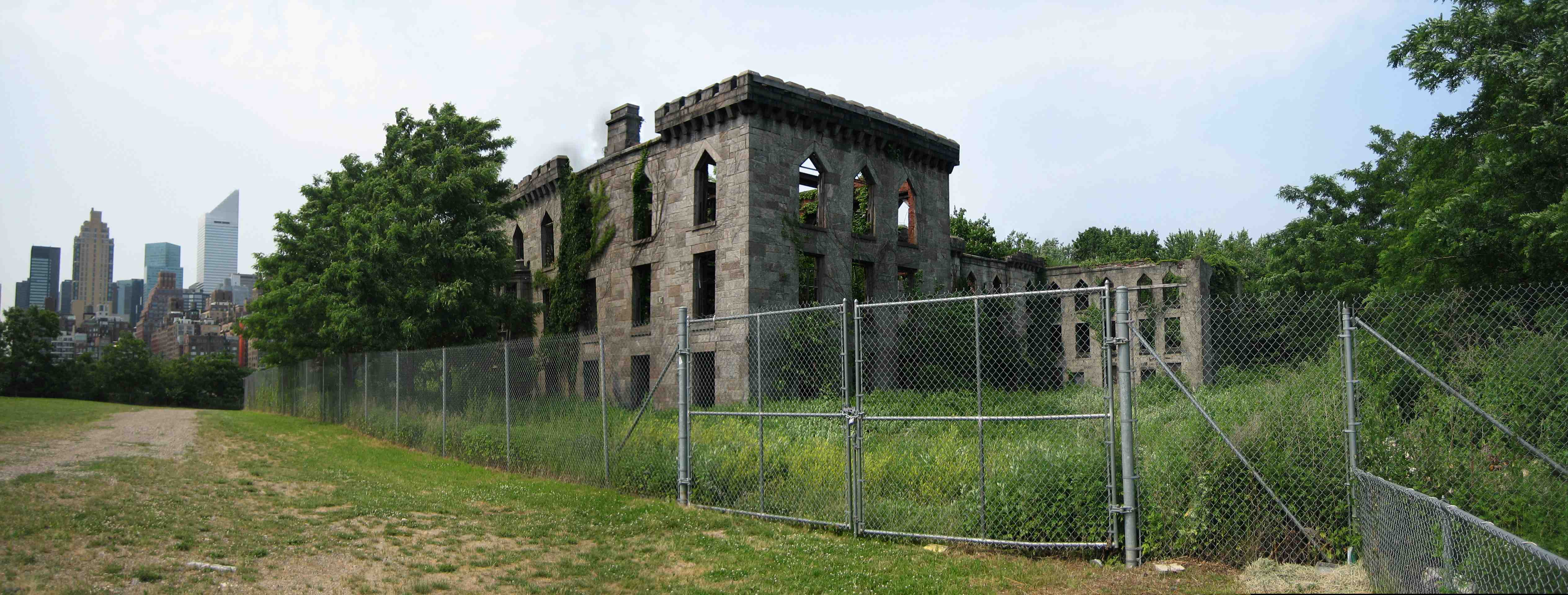
Ruins of the Smallpox Hospital, 2007

NYC Health + Hospitals/Coler is located in the northern portion of the island and has been Roosevelt Island's only public hospital since 2013, when Goldwater Memorial Hospital closed. Although the 1969 plan for Roosevelt Island called for dedicated fire and police stations, as of 2024 the island receives all of its emergency services from Queens. Roosevelt Island is patrolled by the 114th Precinct of the New York City Police Department, located at 34-16 Astoria Boulevard in Astoria, Queens. The Roosevelt Island Public Safety Department also patrols the island; its officers can make arrests but do not carry weapons.

Roosevelt Island has no firehouse. Fire protection services are provided by Engine Company 260 of the New York City Fire Department (FDNY), located at 11-15 37th Avenue in Astoria. The FDNY maintains its Special Operations Command facility at 750 Main Street on the island. Engine Company 261, in Long Island City, served the island until it closed in 2003. There was controversy over the firehouse's closure, and a New York Supreme Court judge subsequently ruled that the closure was illegal. In 2019, mayor Bill de Blasio's office told reporters that the firehouse would not reopen because the island already had additional emergency services.

== Recreation and green spaces ==
=== Parks ===
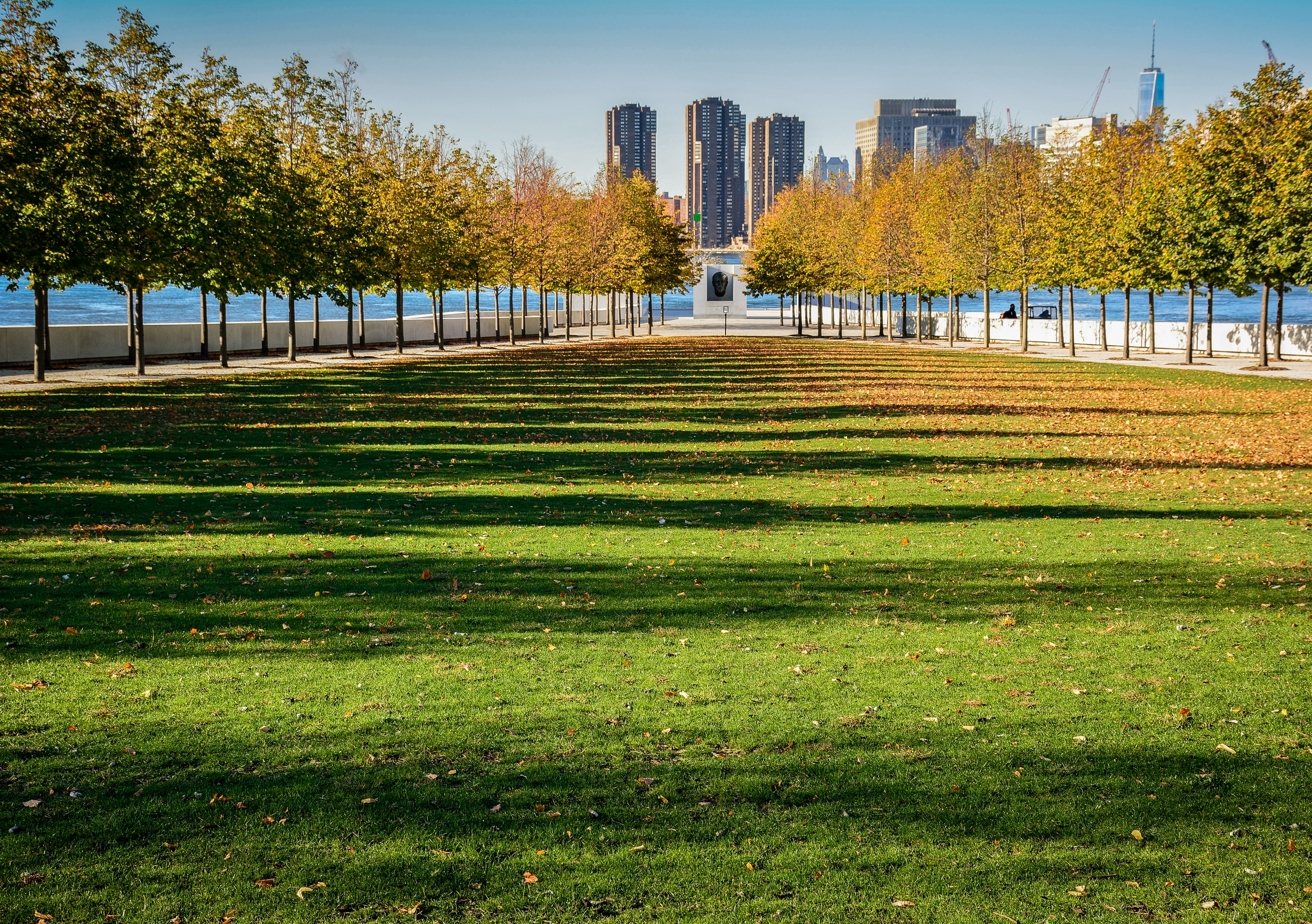
Four Freedoms Park at the southern end of Roosevelt Island

When Roosevelt Island was redeveloped in the 1970s, about a quarter of the land area was set aside for parks. The island has four primary parks: Lighthouse, Octagon, Southpoint, and Four Freedoms parks. At the northern tip of Roosevelt Island is Lighthouse Park, named after the Blackwell Island Light. Octagon Park, a 15-acre (6.1 ha) green space, contains a prow-shaped performance stage facing the East River's west channel; it was originally planned as an ecological park with bedrock outcrops. Near the south end of the island is Southpoint Park, a seven-acre (2.8 ha) green space containing the Strecker Lab and Smallpox Hospital buildings. The four-acre (1.6 ha) Franklin D. Roosevelt Four Freedoms Park, a New York State Park, opened in 2012 at the southern end of the island. Four Freedoms Park was designed by Louis Kahn in 1974 and consists of two rows of trees converging toward a granite "room" at the island's southern tip.

Additionally, the southern part of Cornell Tech contains a 6-foot-tall (1.8 m), publicly accessible berm around 6 acres (2.4 ha) in area. The berm is undeveloped, but the buildings it is intended to protect from flooding are planned to be built by 2027.

There is a smaller park located around the Blackwell House. The southern tip of Roosevelt Island was formerly occupied by the Delacorte Fountain, which was donated by publisher George T. Delacorte Jr. in mid-1967 and dedicated in 1969. The fountain sprayed water from the East River 400 to 600 feet (120 to 180 m) into the air. A local group planted trees at the southern tip of the island in 1985, which quickly died due to blasts from the Delacorte Fountain; the fountain was turned off in the 1980s and subsequently taken apart. The entire island is circled by a publicly accessible waterfront promenade. Because of its greenery, Roosevelt Island received a Tree City USA designation for several years in the 1990s and 2000s.

=== Recreational facilities ===
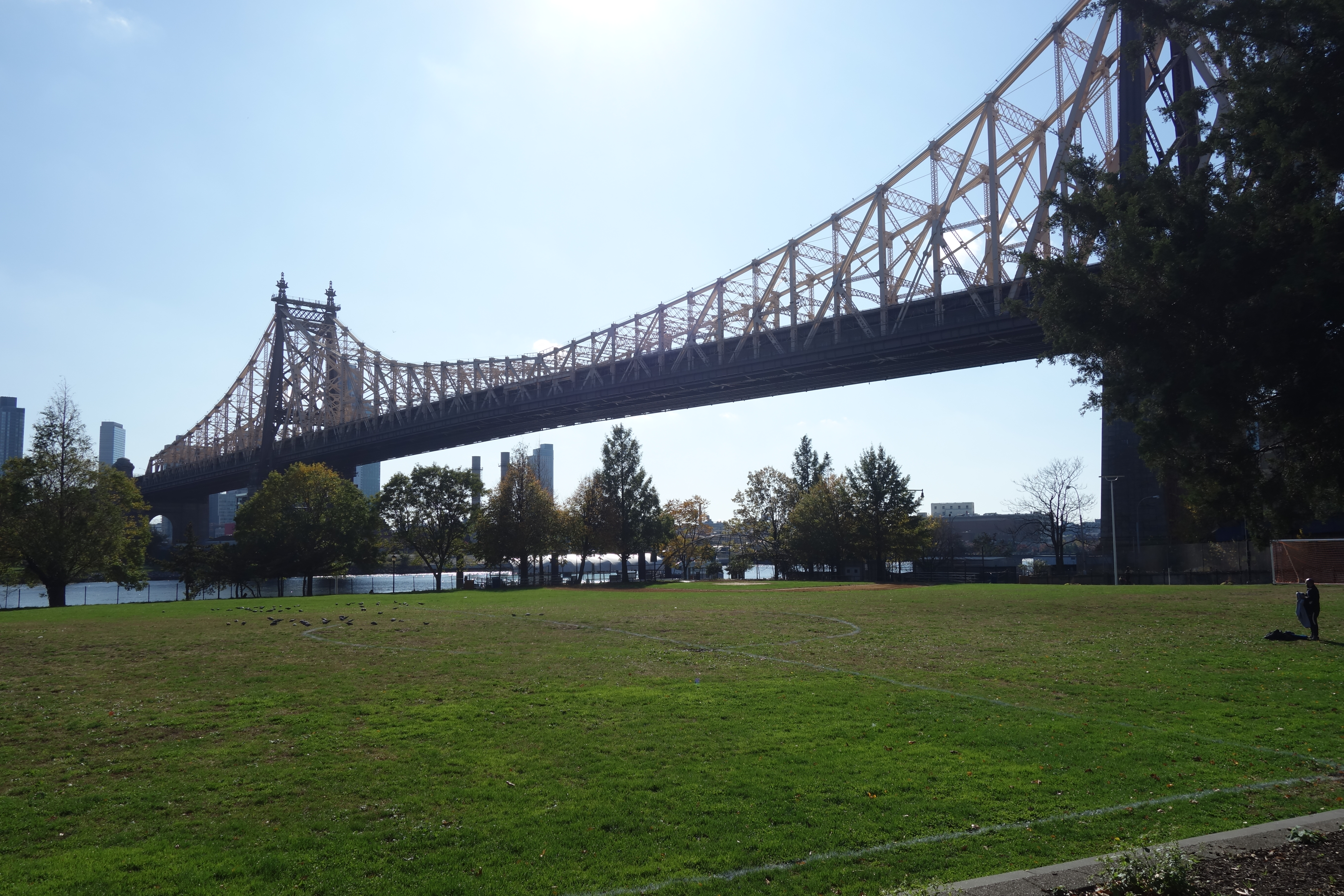
Firefighters Field

There are four outdoor recreational fields on Roosevelt Island:

- Capobianco Field, located south of the Roosevelt Island Bridge ramp; measures 175 by 230 feet (53 by 70 m)
- Firefighters Field, located next to the ferry terminal north of Queensboro Bridge; measures 303 by 178 feet (92 by 54 m)
- McManus Field, located across from the New York City Department of Sanitation building at the north end of the island. Originally known as Octagon Park, it contained soccer, tennis, and baseball facilities, as well as areas for picnics and barbecues. The park was renamed from Octagon Field in October 2019 to honor Jack McManus, the former Chief of the Roosevelt Island Public Safety Department.
- Pony Field, located east of the Octagon; measures 250 by 230 feet (76 by 70 m)

The Roosevelt Island Racquet Club is located near the Roosevelt Island Tramway stop and was developed in the early 1990s, with 11 courts underneath a pair of domes. Also next to the tram stop is the Sportspark indoor recreation center, with a studio, swimming pool, gym, and recreation room. There are additional tennis courts in Octagon Park, next to the Octagon.

== Education ==
=== Schools and higher education ===
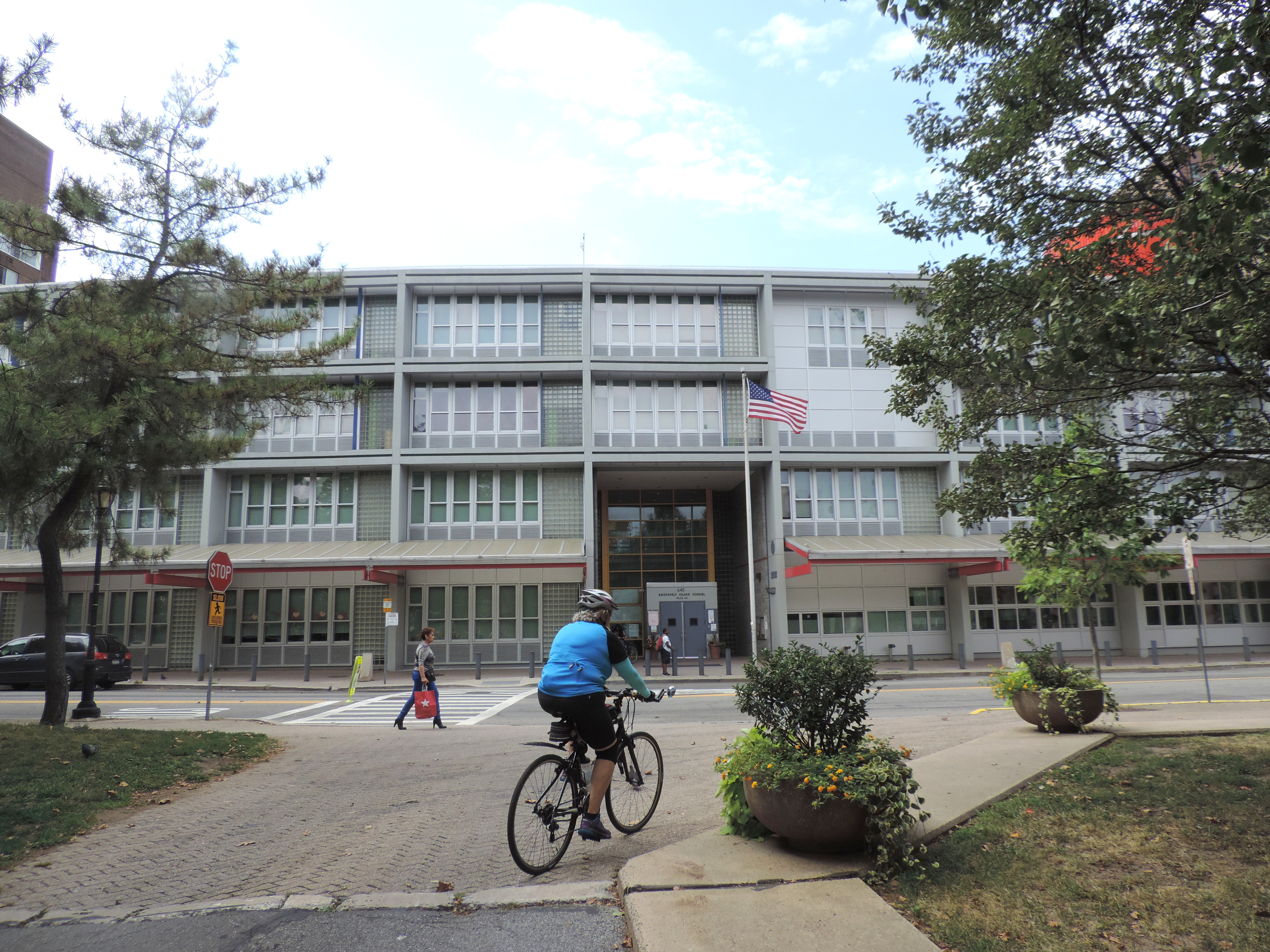
PS 217

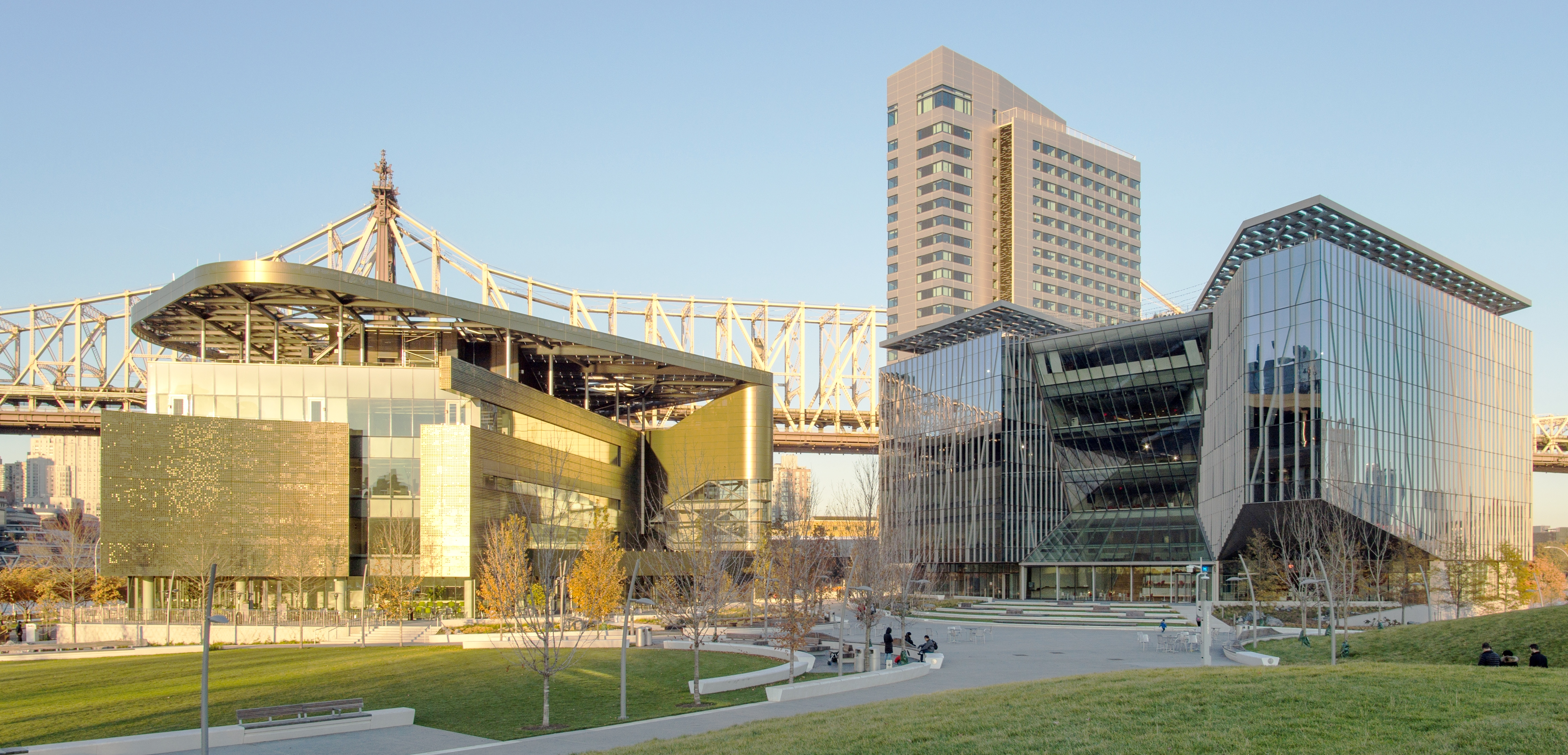
Cornell Tech

Roosevelt Island is served by the New York City Department of Education. When it was redeveloped as a residential community in the 1970s, the island was planned with up to 16 schools serving grades K-12, each accommodating 180 to 300 students. Roosevelt Island's schools were spread across several apartment buildings. The school system taught fine arts as part of a partnership with Solomon R. Guggenheim Museum, and each school taught a foreign language as well.

The first school on Roosevelt Island opened in 1975 with a single student and two teachers. By the 1980s, the island had five school buildings, each serving two grades. All of the island's schools were combined in 1992 into PS/IS 217 Roosevelt Island School, which is located on Main Street. By the 21st century, PS/IS 217 was the only public school on the island, serving students from pre-kindergarten to grade 8. High-school students on the island generally went to schools in Manhattan. The Child School and Legacy High School serves special needs children with learning and emotional disabilities.

In 2011, Mayor Michael Bloomberg announced that Cornell Tech, a Cornell University-Technion-Israel Institute of Technology graduate school of applied sciences, would be built on the island. The first phase of Cornell Tech opened in 2017.

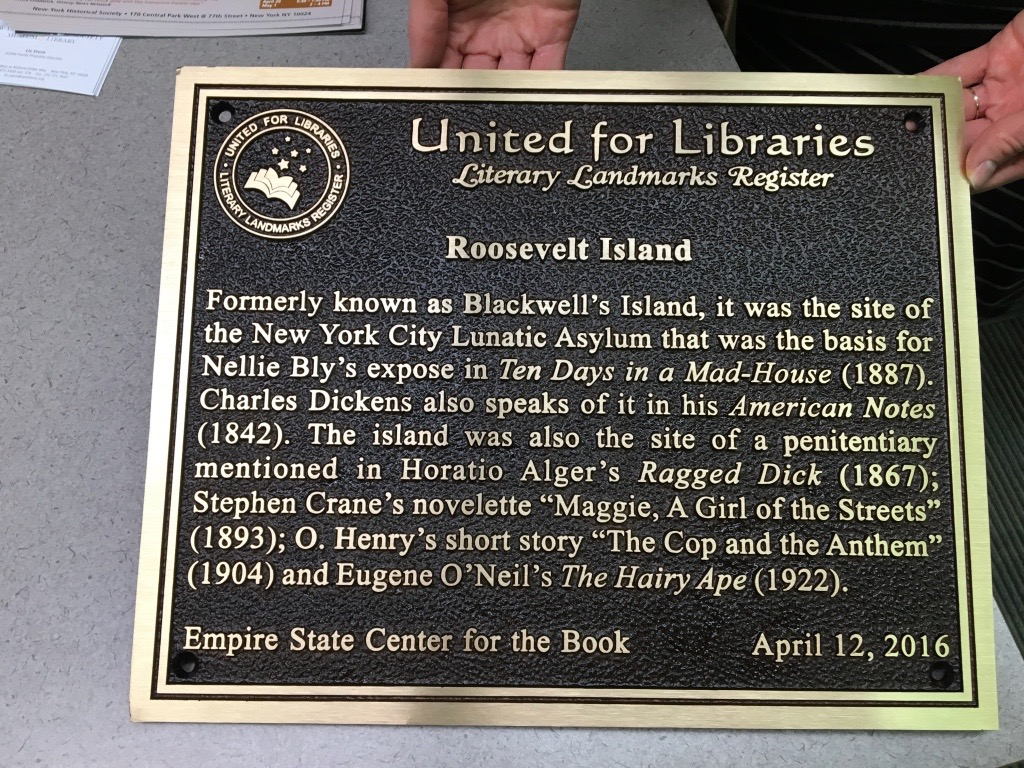
United for Libraries Literary Landmark dedicated by the Empire State Center for the Book

=== Library ===
The New York Public Library (NYPL) operates the Roosevelt Island branch at 504 Main Street. The library was founded in the 1970s as a volunteer initiative. Two residents, Dorothy and Herman Reade, founded the island's first library within a rented space in 1976; the collection had moved to 625 Main Street by 1977. The Reades' library was unusual in that it used a custom classification system, rather than the Dewey Decimal Classification system, which the Reades did not know much about. The library moved to its own building at 524 Main Street in 1979 or the 1980s. The library on Main Street was named the Dorothy and Herman Reade Library of Roosevelt Island in the early 1980s. Residents originally paid dues to access the library.

The library became a branch of the NYPL system in 1998, allowing the branch to access the NYPL's much larger collection. The Empire State Center for the Book dedicated a plaque on the island in 2016, marking the island's literary connections. The current NYPL branch at 504 Main Street opened in January 2021 and covers 5,200 square feet (480 m^{2}).

== Religion ==
There have been churches and chapels for several Christian denominations on the island. The Chapel of the Good Shepherd, a Late Victorian Gothic style structure, was Roosevelt Island's first church and operated until 1958 as an Episcopal church. The chapel reopened in 1975 as a community center. The Chapel of Our Lady, Consoler of the Afflicted dated to 1909 and was a Gothic-style stone building serving the island's Catholic community. The Church of the Good Samaritan was developed for the Lutheran community in 1917. Both the Chapel of Our Lady and the Church of the Good Samaritan have since been demolished. At the Metropolitan Hospital was an Episcopal chapel, the Chapel of the Holy Spirit (consecrated 1925), and a Catholic chapel, the Chapel of the Sacred Heart.

Welfare Island originally contained the Council Synagogue, which opened in 1926 and was described as having a "pleasing exterior" and a "simple, dignified interior". Following the residential redevelopment, the Roosevelt Island Jewish Congregation was founded c. 1987; the Chabad Lubavitch Center of Roosevelt Island moved into the RIJC's space in 2006. Chabad of Roosevelt Island also operates a Chabad Jewish student organization in association with Cornell Tech, which accommodates many international students from Israel. There is also a mosque operated by the Islamic Society of Roosevelt Island.

== Transportation ==
Roosevelt Island transportation

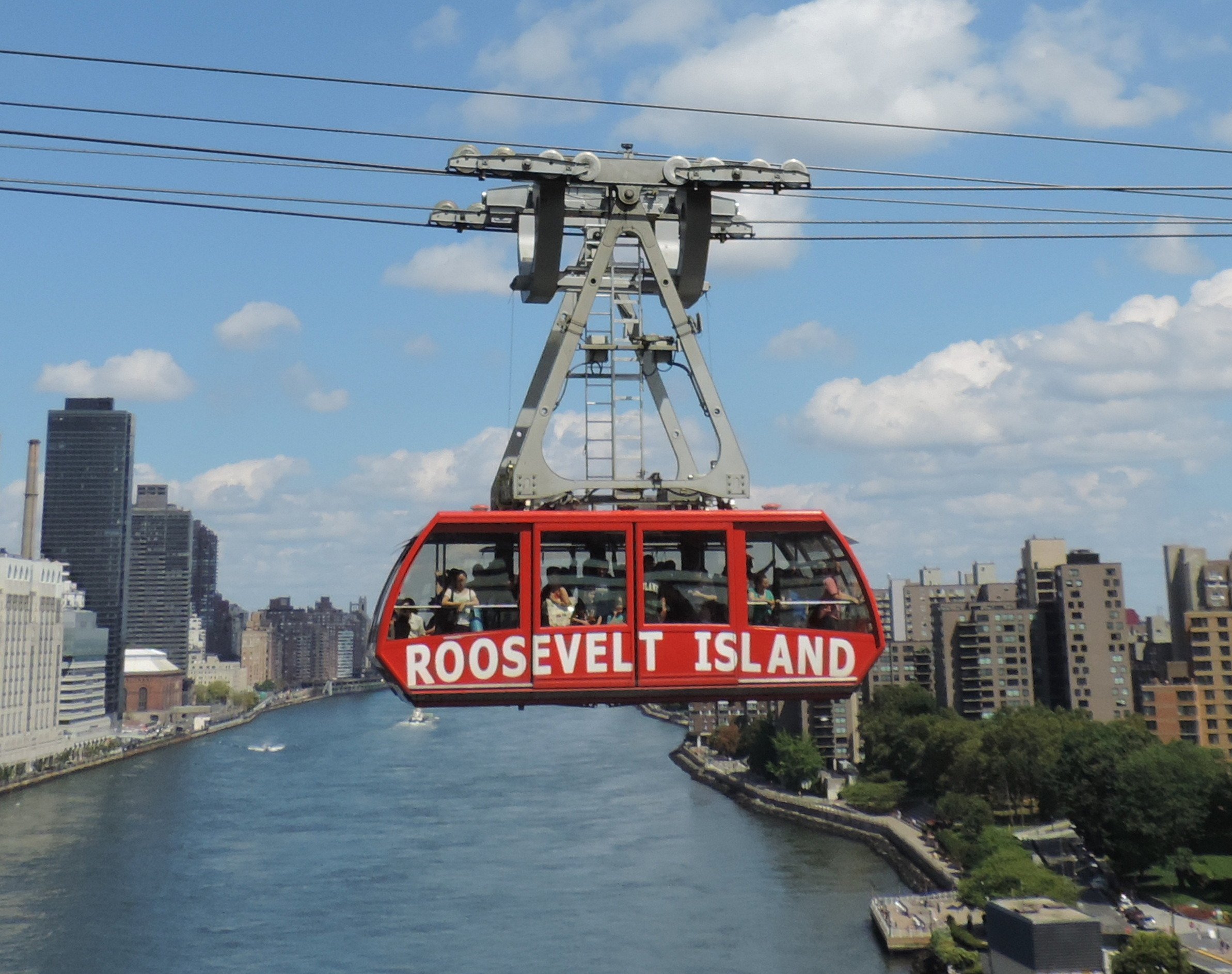
Roosevelt Island Tramway car in operation

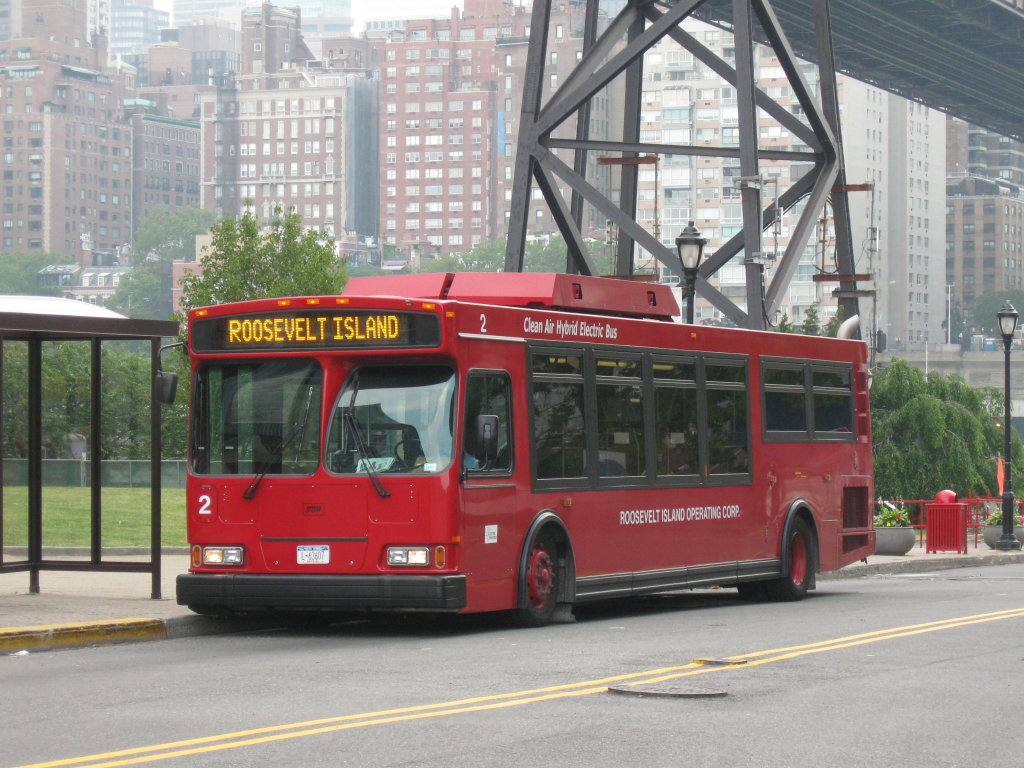
Roosevelt Island Red Bus at Tramway Plaza

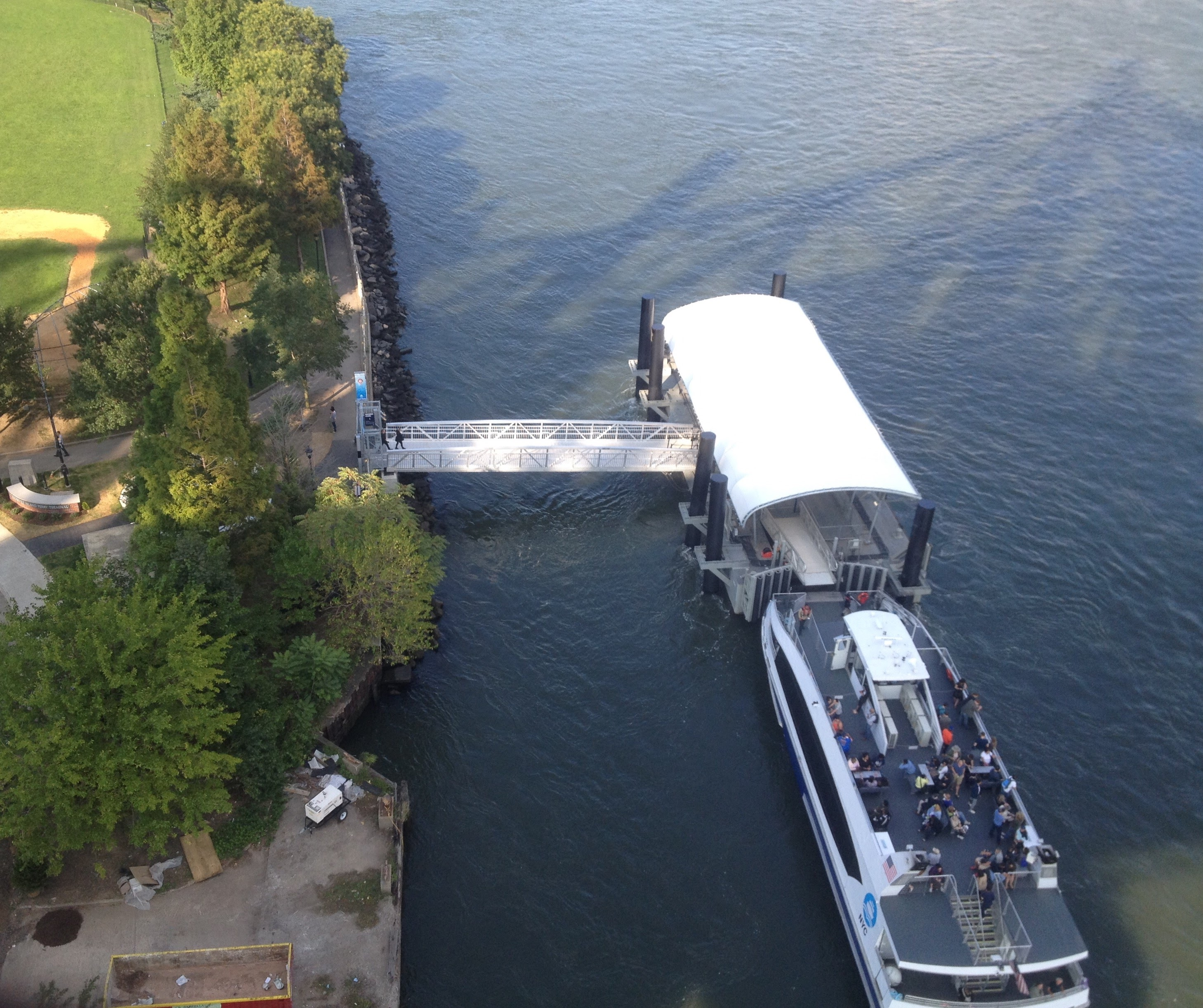
Astoria route NYC Ferry docked at Roosevelt Island

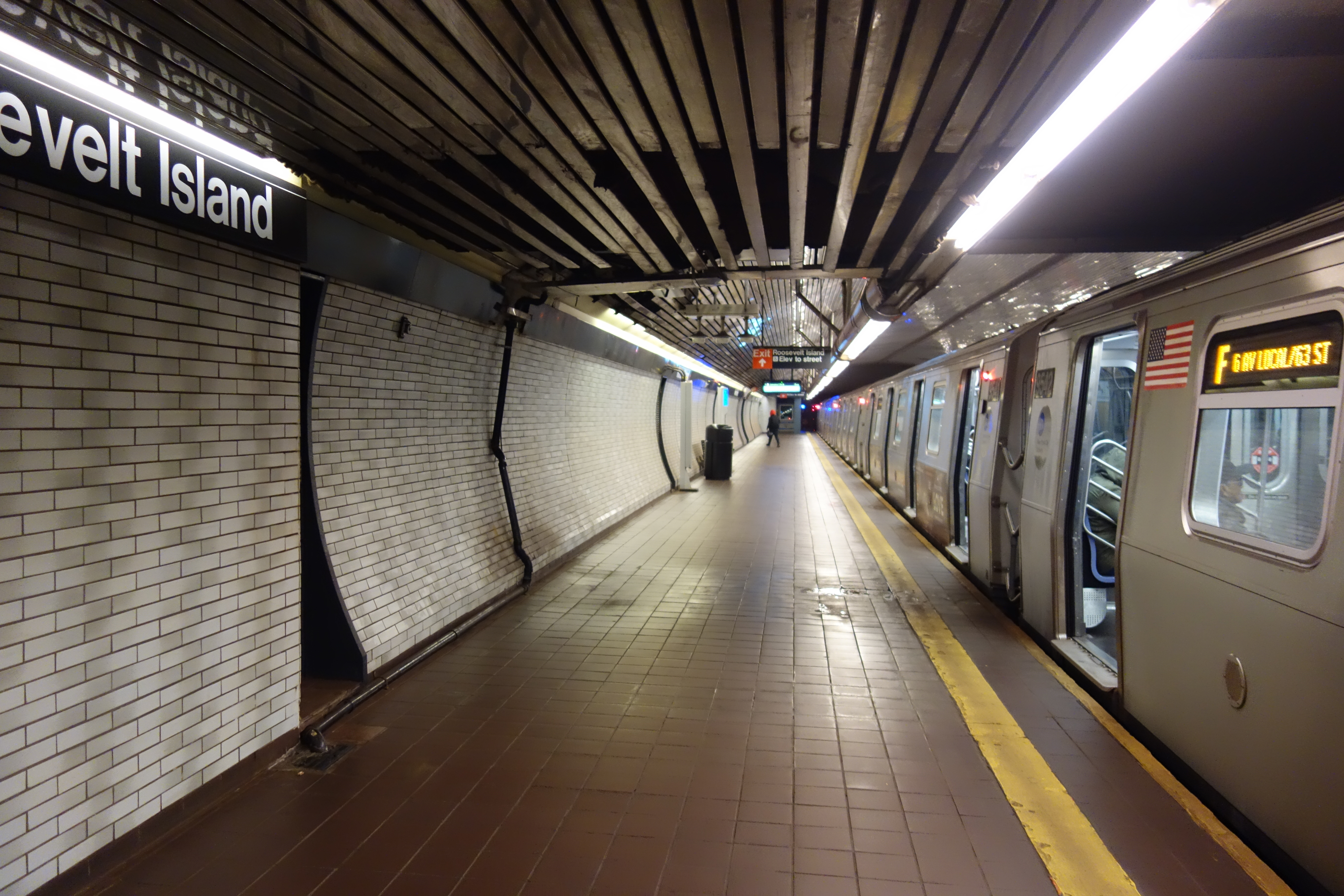
F train at the eponymous subway station

Until its development in the late 20th century, Roosevelt Island was largely inaccessible from the outside world, and a guard banned most visitors, including all children under age 12. The island was accessed solely by rowboat until the early 20th century. Even through the 1950s, the only modes of transit to and from the island were a ferry from 78th Street in Manhattan and an elevator from the Queensboro Bridge.

As of 2024, the island is accessible via bridge, aerial tramway, ferry, and subway. Although the tramway and subway stations are both wheelchair-accessible, both modes of transit can experience outages that occasionally make it impossible for disabled residents to travel to and from the island. Furthermore, despite the existence of several modes of transit, the island still had a reputation for being hard to access during the 21st century.

=== Pedestrian and vehicular access ===
Although Roosevelt Island is located directly under the Queensboro Bridge, it is no longer directly accessible from the bridge itself. A trolley previously connected passengers from Queens and Manhattan to a stop in the middle of the bridge, where passengers took an elevator down to the island. The trolley operated from the bridge's opening in 1909 until April 7, 1957. An elevator building, on the bridge's north side, was finished in 1918 or 1919. The elevator was closed to the public in 1957, after the Roosevelt Island Bridge opened, but was not demolished until 1970. As late as August 1973, another passenger elevator ran from the Queens end of the bridge to the island,

The Roosevelt Island Bridge, a vertical-lift bridge over the East River's eastern channel to Astoria, Queens, opened in 1955. It is the only vehicular route to the island and also contains a sidewalk. News media said in 2001 that the bridge was almost never lifted, though it was lifted more frequently starting in the 2000s. There is a bike lane on the bridge.

Roosevelt Island's main parking facility is the Motorgate Garage, which was designed by the firm of Kallman & McKinnell and originally had 1,000 parking spaces. It is designed in a brutalist style, with a concrete facade, and also included the island's first post office and fire station. There are also parking meters along Main Street, but parking is limited to 20 minutes. Since 2020, the island has also had Citi Bike bikeshare stations.

=== Mass transit ===
The New York City Subway's 63rd Street Line was proposed in 1965 with a station directly serving the island. Service on the 63rd Street Line began in October 1989, but the line had no direct subway access to much of Queens until 2001. The line's eponymous station (served by the F and M trains) is one of the deepest stations below sea level in the system, at more than 100 feet (30 m) below ground level. The BMT 60th Street Tunnel (N, R, and W trains) and the IND 53rd Street Line (E, F, and <F> trains) both pass under Roosevelt Island, without stopping, on their way between Manhattan and Queens. There are emergency exit shafts to the island from both the 53rd Street and 60th Street tunnels.

The Roosevelt Island Tramway was proposed in the 1970s after delays in the subway's construction. It was completed in May 1976, providing access to Midtown Manhattan, and had been intended as a temporary mode of transport until the subway station opened. The tram was completely reconstructed in 2010.

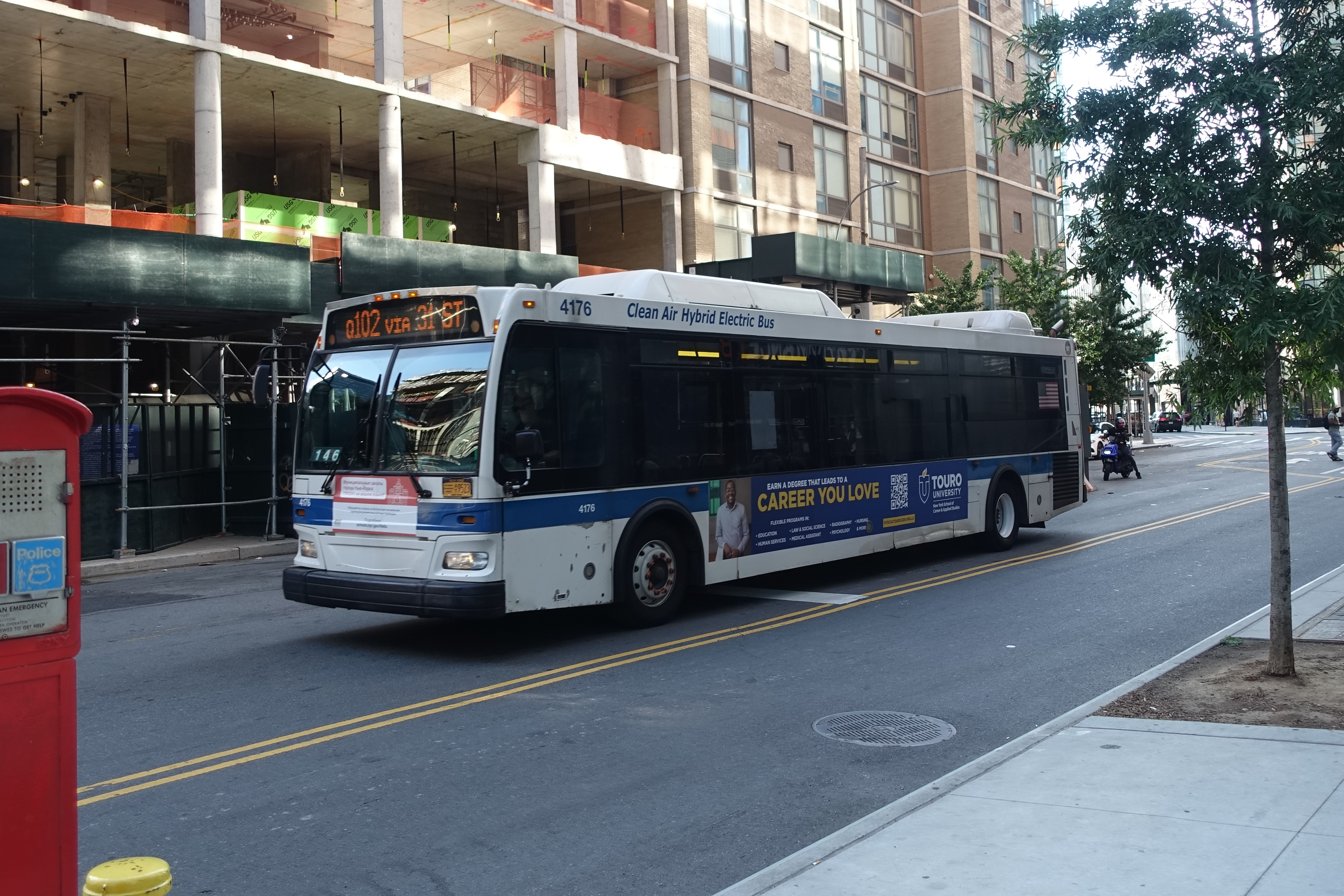
An MTA Orion VII NG running on the Q102

When the island was being redeveloped in the 1970s, the UDC had planned to operate 20-seat electric minibuses there. As of 2025, MTA Bus's Q102 route operates between the island and Queens, with southbound buses ending at Roosevelt Island Tramway and northbound buses starting at the Roosevelt Island Subway Station. RIOC also operates the Red Bus, a shuttle bus service that circulates around the island. The latter service is fare-free, connecting apartment buildings to the subway and tramway.

A ferry service ran from Welfare Island to Manhattan from 1935 to June 1956, although the island's old ferry terminal remained standing for several years. A ferry route ran directly to Lower Manhattan briefly during 1986. Roosevelt Island has been served by NYC Ferry's Astoria route since August 2017. The ferry landing is on the east side of the island near the tramway station.

== Notable people ==
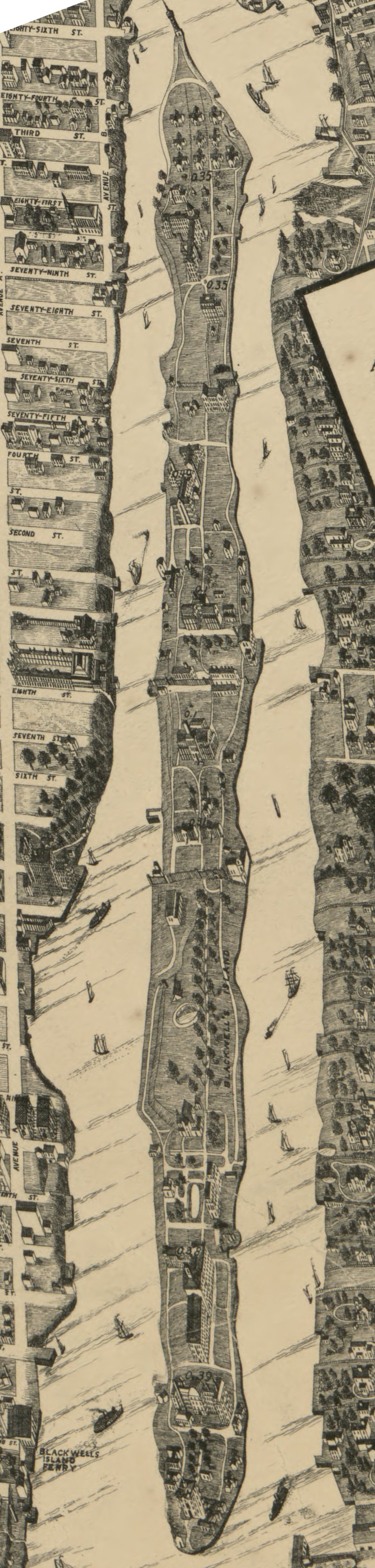
Detail of Roosevelt Island, from the Taylor Map of New York in c. 1879

=== Prisoners ===
- George Appo – pickpocket and con artist
- Ethel Byrne – sentenced to 30 days for distribution of information about birth control; became the first woman in the U.S. ever to be force-fed in prison after going on a hunger strike there
- Ida Craddock – convicted for obscenity under the Comstock laws
- Ann O'Delia Diss Debar – served six months for fraud as a medium
- George Washington Dixon – served six months for libel against Reverend Francis L. Hawks
- Fritz Duquesne – Nazi spy and leader of the Duquesne Spy Ring, the largest convicted espionage case in United States history
- Becky Edelson – for "using threatening language" during a speech
- Carlo de Fornaro – for criminal libel
- Emma Goldman – several times, for activities in support of anarchism and birth control and against the World War I draft
- Billie Holiday – served on prostitution charges
- Mary Jones – 19th-century transgender prostitute who was a center of media attention for coming to court wearing feminine attire
- Eugene Reising – firearms designer convicted of violating the Sullivan Act
- Madame Restell – for performing abortions
- Margaret Sanger – sentenced to 30 days for distribution of information about birth control; jailed after her sister Ethel Byrne
- Boss Tweed – served one year on corruption-related charges; had a private room and secretary on the island
- Mae West – served eight days on public obscenity charges for her play Sex

=== Visitors ===
- Charles Dickens – described conditions at the "Octagon", an asylum for the mentally ill then located on the northern portion of the island, in his American Notes (1842)
- William Wallace Sanger – physician-in-chief at the Blackwell's Island Hospital, wrote here the book The History of Prostitution including his experiences as physician-in-chief
- Joseph Lister - near the end of his trip to the United States, performed an operation at Charity Hospital on Blackwell's Island (1876)
- Nellie Bly – went undercover as a patient in the Women's Lunatic Asylum and reported what happened in the New York World as well as her book Ten Days in a Mad-House (1887)
- Egon Erwin Kisch – visited the Welfare Island penitentiary under a false name (Mister Becker) for the report "Prisons on an Island on East River" as part of his reportage Volume "Paradise America" (1930)

=== Residents ===
- Kofi Annan (1938–2018) – United Nations Secretary-General
- Michelle Bachelet (born 1951) – president of Chile and Executive Director of the United Nations Entity for Gender Equality and the Empowerment of Women (UN Women)
- Jonah Bobo (born 1997) – actor
- Michael Brodsky (born 1948) – author
- Perry Chen (born 1976) – entrepreneur, best known for being the creator and principal founder of Kickstarter, the online crowdfunding platform for creative ideas
- Alice Childress (1912–1994) – playwright and author
- Billy Crawford (born 1982) – singer, songwriter and actor
- Roy Eaton (born 1930) – pianist
- Mike Epps (born 1970) – stand-up comedian, actor, film producer, writer and rapper, best known for playing Day-Day Jones in Next Friday and its sequel, Friday After Next
- Paul Feinman (1960–2021) – associate judge of the New York Court of Appeals
- Wendy Fitzwilliam (born 1972) – former Miss Universe and Miss Trinidad and Tobago
- Amanda Forsythe (born 1976) – light lyric soprano known for her interpretations of baroque music and the works of Rossini
- Buddy Hackett (1924–2003) – comedian and actor
- Anna-Maria Henckel von Donnersmarck (born 1940) – German political activist
- Count Leo-Ferdinand Henckel von Donnersmarck (1935–2009) – German businessman and official of the Sovereign Military Order of Malta
- Count Florian Henckel von Donnersmarck (born 1973) – German film director
- Tim Keller (1950–2023) – Christian author and minister
- Al Lewis (1923–2006) – actor, best known as "Grandpa" in The Munsters
- Sarah Jessica Parker (born 1965) – actress
- Andrea Rosen (born 1974) – comedian
- Jon Sciambi (born 1970) – ESPN broadcaster, play-by-play announcer on Marquee Sports Network for the Chicago Cubs
- Lyndsey Scott – model, actress, iOS mobile app software developer

== See also ==
- List of islands of New York (state)
- List of Manhattan neighborhoods
