= House of assignation =

House of assignation is an older term, used in nineteenth-century English to refer to what today might be called rooms by the hour, meaning an establishment that is either or both of the below:

- Love hotel
- Brothel

In the U.S. in the post-Civil War era, the term seems to have been applied to establishments where married women could arrange for private encounters with lovers, rather than take the risk of a neighbor or servant seeing a man enter their homes when the husband wasn't there. This usage would be distinct from a brothel, where the women were in residence and paid by the men.

== See also ==
- Disorderly house
- House of ill repute
