= List of fake buildings in Toronto =

This is a list of fake buildings in Toronto, Canada. After the end of World War II, electric demand grew exponentially. Toronto Hydro built house-shaped substations with slight variations from six base models ranging from ranch-style houses to Georgian mansions. The exterior designs of residential buildings allowed them to enclose substations in residential neighborhoods without much opposition from the communities as they blended in with their neighboring houses. Throughout the 20th century, the company built hundreds of these fake houses in Toronto area.

Image	Address	District / Province	Coordinates	Notes and references
Upload image	191 Centennial Rd	Scarborough, Ontario	43.78335°N 79.14869°W	
Upload image	351 Morrish Rd	Scarborough, Ontario	43.78765°N 79.17208°W	
Upload image	160 Morningside Ave	Scarborough, Ontario	43.76255°N 79.18427°W	
Upload image	160 Orton Park Rd	Scarborough, Ontario	43.77265°N 79.20960°W	
Upload image	37 Galloway Rd	Scarborough, Ontario	43.75339°N 79.19064°W	
Upload image	3780 Lawrence Ave E	Scarborough, Ontario	43.76260°N 79.21389°W	
Upload image	50 Sunderland Crescent	Scarborough, Ontario	43.77371°N 79.24243°W	
Upload image	1994 Brimley Rd	Scarborough, Ontario	43.78562°N 79.26758°W	
Upload image	2753 Midland Ave	Scarborough, Ontario	43.79637°N 79.28280°W	
Upload image	74 Livingston Rd	Scarborough, Ontario	43.74578°N 79.19880°W	
Upload image	30 Greencedar Circuit	Scarborough, Ontario	43.75651°N 79.23262°W	
Upload image	510 Bellamy Rd N	Scarborough, Ontario	43.75823°N 79.23585°W	
Upload image	3 Bernadine St	Scarborough, Ontario	43.76816°N 79.26035°W	
Upload image	816 Brimley Rd	Scarborough, Ontario	43.75265°N 79.25535°W	
Upload image	657 Brimley Rd	Scarborough, Ontario	43.74472°N 79.25140°W	
Upload image	2 Canadine Rd	Scarborough, Ontario	43.76682°N 79.27058°W	
Upload image	46 Malamute Crescent	Scarborough, Ontario	43.77953°N 79.30264°W	
Upload image	300 Palmdale Dr	Scarborough, Ontario	43.77728°N 79.31146°W	
Upload image	676 Midland Ave	Scarborough, Ontario	43.72562°N 79.25464°W	
Upload image	1047 Birchmount Rd	Scarborough, Ontario	43.73373°N 79.27886°W	
Upload image	46 Wexford Blvd	Scarborough, Ontario	43.73822°N 79.29955°W	
Upload image	54 Brian Ave	Scarborough, Ontario	43.74739°N 79.30156°W	
Upload image	7 Trestleside Grove	Scarborough, Ontario	43.75104°N 79.30743°W	
Upload image	159 Ellesmere Rd	Scarborough, Ontario	43.75951°N 79.30693°W	
Upload image	180 Sloane Ave	North York, Ontario	43.73589°N 79.31274°W	
Upload image	58 Northdale Rd	North York, Ontario	43.76326°N 79.38312°W	
Upload image	165 Burbank Dr	North York, Ontario	43.77864°N 79.38614°W	
Upload image	85 Pemberton Ave	North York, Ontario	43.78179°N 79.40982°W	
Upload image	283 Churchill Ave	North York, Ontario	43.76891°N 79.43306°W	
Upload image	18 Brenthall Ave	North York, Ontario	43.77494°N 79.44230°W	
Upload image	640 Millwood Road	Toronto, Ontario	43.70424°N 79.37574°W	
Upload image	29 Nelson Street	Toronto, Ontario	43.64870°N 79.38864°W	Duncan Station
Upload image	130 Hammersmith Ave	Toronto, Ontario	43.67165°N 79.29480°W	
Upload image	144 Hazelwood Ave	Toronto, Ontario	43.67910°N 79.34062°W	
Upload image	555 Spadina Rd	Toronto, Ontario	43.69375°N 79.41450°W	
Upload image	85 Elm Ridge Dr	Toronto, Ontario	43.70368°N 79.43333°W	
Upload image	518 Runnymede Rd	Toronto, Ontario	43.66069°N 79.48046°W	
Upload image	132 Berry Rd	Etobicoke, Ontario	43.63808°N 79.48535°W	
Upload image	54 Reid Manor	Etobicoke, Ontario	43.63886°N 79.50637°W	
Upload image	913 Islington Ave	Etobicoke, Ontario	43.62487°N 79.51498°W	
Upload image	1066 Islington Ave	Etobicoke, Ontario	43.63467°N 79.51962°W	
Upload image	10 Bellman Ave	Etobicoke, Ontario	43.60783°N 79.53089°W	
Upload image	16 Burlingame Rd	Etobicoke, Ontario	43.60069°N 79.54653°W	
Upload image	756 Browns Line	Etobicoke, Ontario	43.60808°N 79.54840°W	
Upload image	130A Westrose Ave	Etobicoke, Ontario	43.65586°N 79.51766°W	
Upload image	1179 Royal York Rd	Etobicoke, Ontario	43.66394°N 79.51837°W	
Upload image	1442 Islington Ave	Etobicoke, Ontario	43.65866°N 79.52993°W	
Upload image	55 Ashbourne Dr	Etobicoke, Ontario	43.64387°N 79.54351°W	
Upload image	27 Wingrove Hill	Etobicoke, Ontario	43.65362°N 79.54314°W	
Upload image	4237 Bloor St W	Etobicoke, Ontario	43.63429°N 79.56657°W	
Upload image	119 Mill Rd	Etobicoke, Ontario	43.63149°N 79.57449°W	
Upload image	395 Rathburn Rd	Etobicoke, Ontario	43.65477°N 79.56360°W	
Upload image	40 Torrington Dr	Etobicoke, Ontario	43.65334°N 79.57972°W	
Upload image	746 Scarlett Rd	Etobicoke, Ontario	43.69736°N 79.52273°W	
Upload image	1 Duffield Rd	Etobicoke, Ontario	43.69023°N 79.53175°W	
Upload image	8 Newell Ct	Etobicoke, Ontario	43.67997°N 79.52498°W	
Upload image	191 The Westway	Etobicoke, Ontario	43.68834°N 79.54310°W	
Upload image	1720 Islington Ave	Etobicoke, Ontario	43.67780°N 79.53850°W	
Upload image	95 Kingsview Blvd	Etobicoke, Ontario	43.69663°N 79.56037°W	
Upload image	18 Warbeck Pl	Etobicoke, Ontario	43.68931°N 79.55565°W	
Upload image	63 Hunting Ridge	Etobicoke, Ontario	43.68124°N 79.55235°W	
Upload image	64 Dunsany Crescent	Etobicoke, Ontario	43.68430°N 79.56823°W	
Upload image	59 Dalegrove Crescent	Etobicoke, Ontario	43.67144°N 79.56286°W	
Upload image	59 Glen Agar Dr	Etobicoke, Ontario	43.66494°N 79.55408°W	
Upload image	33 Hardwick Ct	Etobicoke, Ontario	43.66917°N 79.58313°W	
Upload image	15 Arcot Blvd	Etobicoke, Ontario	43.72739°N 79.54972°W	
Upload image	63B Thistle Down Blvd	Etobicoke, Ontario	43.73711°N 79.55874°W	
Upload image	62 Elmhurst Dr	Etobicoke, Ontario	43.72394°N 79.55640°W	
Upload image	2310 Islington Ave	Etobicoke, Ontario	43.71580°N 79.55577°W	
Upload image	1 Annabelle Dr	Etobicoke, Ontario	43.75117°N 79.58623°W	
Upload image	153 Taysham Crescent	Etobicoke, Ontario	43.74217°N 79.58090°W	
Upload image	40A Watercliffe Rd	Etobicoke, Ontario	43.73270°N 79.57630°W	
Upload image	39 Gunton Dr	Etobicoke, Ontario	43.72552°N 79.57404°W	
Upload image	2130 Kipling Ave	Etobicoke, Ontario	43.71850°N 79.57057°W	
Upload image	2 Guinness Ave	Etobicoke, Ontario	43.72263°N 79.58470°W	

== See also ==
- Fake building
- List of fake buildings
- Public utility building
