= List of fake buildings =

This is a list of fake buildings which are structures that use urban and suburban camouflage to disguise equipment and city infrastructure facilities that are aesthetically unpleasing in non-industrial neighborhoods. The list does not include utility sheds such as small pumphouses.

== Communication ==
This lists fake buildings used as communication facilities, such as telephone exchanges and data centers.

Name	Image	Address	Town / City	Country	Coordinates	Purpose	Notes and references
West Hartford Data Center		130 South Main Street	West Hartford, Connecticut	United States	41.75336°N 72.74336°W	Data center	Built for telephone exchange, but later converted into a data center.
636 Orange Center Road		636 Orange Center Road	Orange, Connecticut	United States	41.27995°N 73.02723°W	Telecommunication equipment	Frontier Communications building disguised as a single-family home with blackout windows
335 Glen Road		335 Glen Road	Rochester, New York	United States	43.12738°N 77.51907°W	Telecommunication equipment	
91 Pinegrove Avenue		91 Pinegrove Avenue	Rochester, New York	United States	43.22593°N 77.59686°W	Telecommunication equipment	
Henson		13352 Blossomheath Lane	Dallas, Texas	United States	32.93005°N 96.769412°W	Data center	Owned by AT&T. Disguised as a large suburban house.
Henson 2		13229 Southview Lane	Dallas, Texas	United States	32.92961°N 96.76949°W	Data center	Previously owned by AT&T. Disguised as a large suburban house.

== Ventilation ==
This lists fake buildings used for ventilation of enclosed spaces such as tunnels.

Name	Image	Address	Town / City	Country	Coordinates	Purpose	Notes and references
Thornton Tunnel Ventilation House	Upload image	3911 Frances Street	Burnaby, British Columbia	Canada	49.27954°N 123.01840°W	Ventilation shaft	Part of Thornton Tunnel for Canadian National Railway
Towers substation	Upload image	1423 rue Towers	Montreal, Quebec	Canada	45.49273°N 73.58139°W	Ventilation shaft	Historical landmark rebuilt brick by brick as a ventilation station for the Montreal Metro
23–24 Leinster Gardens		23–24 Leinster Gardens	Bayswater, London	England	51.51261°N 0.18361°W	Ventilation shaft	For the London Underground. Disguised with grayed out windows
2 Old Eldon Square		2, Old Eldon Square	Newcastle upon Tyne	England	54.97430°N 1.61445°W	Ventilation shaft	For Tyne and Wear Metro, vents on the roof (seen on the right of the photo)
Chalfont St Giles Ventilation Shaft	Upload image	Bottom House Farm Lane	Chalfont St Giles	England	51.64388°N 0.59665°W	Ventilation shaft	High Speed 2 ventilation shaft disguised as a barn
Chalfont St Peter Ventilation Shaft	Upload image	Chesham Lane	Chalfont St Peter	England	51.62846°N 0.55578°W	Ventilation shaft	High Speed 2 ventilation shaft disguised as a barn
145, rue La Fayette		145, rue La Fayette	10th arrondissement of Paris	France	48.87920°N 2.35614°E	Ventilation shaft	For RATP Paris Métro
29 rue Quincampoix		29 rue Quincampoix	4th arrondissement of Paris	France	48.86029°N 2.35008°E	Ventilation shaft	For RATP. Trompe l'oeil paintings on windows.
Ventilation shaft of the Magenta station	Upload image	174 rue du Faubourg Saint-Denis	10th arrondissement of Paris	France	48.87998°N 2.35763°E	Ventilation shaft	Part of EOLE project
3 rue de l'Aqueduc	Upload image	3 rue de l'Aqueduc	10th arrondissement of Paris	France	48.87978°N 2.35800°E	Technical shaft	Part of EOLE project
Yarmouth Street Ventilation Shaft		Yarmouth Street	Boston, Massachusetts	United States	42.346207°N 71.077265°W	Ventilation shaft	The ventilation shaft (the rightmost portion) was wrapped by a brick facade to create an appearance of a bow-front townhouse
58 Joralemon Street		58 Joralemon Street	Brooklyn, New York	United States	40.69345°N 73.99740°W	Ventilation shaft and emergency exit	For the New York City Subway. Disguised with blacked-out windows.

== Water and wastewater management ==
This lists fake buildings that are used to house equipment for water distribution networks, sewage management, and stormwater management.

Name	Image	Address	Town / City	Country	Coordinates	Purpose	Notes and references
Duffus Street pumping station		5211 Duffus Street	Halifax, Nova Scotia	Canada	44.67087°N 63.60195°W	Sewage pumping station	Halifax Water underground station with an entrance disguised as a split-level home.
North Oakville East Wastewater Pumping Station	Upload image	345 Dundas Street West	Oakville, Ontario	Canada	43.470066°N 79.739913°W	Sewage pumping station	Disguised as an early 20th-century fire station.
WNY1 Solids & Floatables Facility		South of 6400 Anthony M. Defino Way	West New York, New Jersey	United States	40.78640°N 74.00329°W	Combined sewer overflow screening facility	A facility disguised as townhouses, built in 2009 by North Hudson Sewerage Authority
H1 Screening and Wet Weather Pump Station		99 Observer Highway	Hoboken, New Jersey	United States	40.73546°N 74.03131°W	Combined sewer overflow screening and flood pumping station	Disguised as a modern building that has an architectural connection to the Hoboken Terminal
Belindeer Pump Station	Upload image	5700 Belinder Avenue	Fairway, Kansas	United States	39.02586°N 94.61692°W	Sewage pumping station	Johnson County Wastewater
Nall Avenue Holding Station	Upload image	7490 Nall Avenue	Prairie Village, Kansas	United States	38.99347°N 94.64951°W	Sewage pumping station	Johnson County Wastewater
Wade Avenue Pump Station	Upload image	3215 Wade Avenue	Raleigh, North Carolina	United States	35.80076°N 78.67854°W	Water booster pumping station	Raleigh Public Utilities Department
Lake Gaston Pipeline Pump Station	Upload image	207 Beddingfield Way	Valentines, Virginia	United States	36.54661°N 77.86273°W	Water source pipeline pumping station	Lake Gaston is a water source for Virginia Beach, Virginia. The station is disguised as a lake house.
Alline Avenue Pump Station	Upload image	2921 W Alline Avenue	Tampa, Florida	United States	27.89821°N 82.49224°W	Stormwater pumping station	Disguised as a bungalow
Locust Valley Pump Station		20 Meleny Rd	Locust Valley, New York	United States	40.90480°N 73.58274°W	Sewage pumping station	Disguised as a small single family house
Glannon Pump Station		3788 Mt Royal Boulevard	Allison Park, Pennsylvania	United States	40.55423°N 79.97106°W	Sewage pumping station	Disguised as a single family home with a front porch
Highland Park Wastewater Treatment Facility		316 Highland Park Road	Sellersville, Pennsylvania	United States	40.34509°N 75.30164°W	Wastewater treatment plant	Hilltown Township Water & Sewer Authority. Plant disguised as a red barn.
Wyndgate Subdivision Wastewater Treatment Plant	Upload image	128 Wyndgate Valley Drive	O'Fallon, Missouri	United States	38.74815°N 90.80847°W	Membrane bioreactors wastewater treatment plant	A subdivision of Duckett Creek Sanitary District. Plant disguised as a two-story single-family house to blend in with the neighbors.
Riverdale Subdivision Wastewater Treatment Facility	Upload image	1400 Riverdale Manor Drive	O'Fallon, Missouri	United States	38.88364°N 90.74379°W	Membrane bioreactors wastewater treatment plant	A subdivision of Duckett Creek Sanitary District. Plant disguised as a horse barn.
Johns Creek Environmental Campus	Upload image	8100 Holcomb Bridge Road	Alpharetta, Georgia	United States	33.97691°N 84.26613°W	Wastewater treatment plant	Camouflaged to look like an old mill complex
Southport Unit 5 Vacuum Station	Upload image	2281 SE Sidonia Street	Port St. Lucie, Florida	United States	27.27287°N 80.30376°W	Sewage pumping station	Disguised as a bungalow.
Kennedy Avenue Pump Station		6448 Kennedy Avenue	Cincinnati, Ohio	United States	39.18771°N 84.41348°W	Water pumping station	Disguised as an apartment building in the Kennedy Heights neighborhood.
Muddy Creek-Westbourne High Rate Treatment Facility		5723 Muddy Creek Road	Cincinnati, Ohio	United States	39.13361°N 84.63454°W	Wastewater treatment plant	Enhanced high rate settling facility to treat combined sewer overflow. Disguised as a one-story home or office building,

== Heating and cooling ==
This lists fake buildings used to provide heating and cooling services, such as district heating, district cooling and cold district heating.

Name	Image	Address	Town / City	Country	Coordinates	Purpose	Notes and references
Metro Nashville District Energy System	Upload image	90 Peabody Street	Nashville, Tennessee	United States	36.15847°N 86.77039°W	District heating / District cooling	Enclosure with facade that has fake windows

== Electric power distribution ==
This lists fake buildings that are used for electric power distribution, such as distribution substations and transformer houses.

Name	Image	Address	Town / City	Country	Coordinates	Purpose	Notes and references
Strecker Memorial Laboratory		Southpoint Park, Roosevelt Island	New York, New York	United States	40.75230°N 73.95822°W	Power conversion substation	Converted from an infectious disease laboratory
Mott Haven Substation		415 Bruckner Boulevard	Bronx, New York	United States	40.80783°N 73.90622°W	Substation	ConEdison substation made to look like townhouses in a gated community.
51 W Ontario Street		51 W Ontario Street	Chicago, Illinois	United States	41.89306°N 87.63000°W	Substation	Georgian building with fake front doors and windows used as vents.
4227 40th St NW		4227 40th St NW	Washington, DC	United States	38.94409°N 77.07843°W	Substation	Pepco substation disguised as a two-story brick house. Side windows painted as blinds.
4225 40th St NW		4225 40th St NW	Washington, DC	United States	38.94414°N 77.07820°W	Substation	Disguised as a shed behind 4227 40th St NW
4000 Van Ness St NW		4000 Van Ness St NW	Washington, DC	United States	38.94264°N 77.07900°W	Substation	Pepco substation disguised as an office building with blacked-out windows
1001 Harvard St NW		1001 Harvard St NW	Washington, DC	United States	38.92698°N 77.02645°W	Substation	Pepco substation that imitates an old train station but with whitewashed windows
Pepco Darnestown Substation		16010 Riffle Ford Road	Gaithersburg, Maryland	United States	39.11778°N 77.26282°W	Substation	Pepco substation that imitates a large barn with metal silo in a rural area
2530 Norton Street		2530 Norton Street	Rochester, New York	United States	43.18862°N 77.55358°W	Substation	
250 Seneca Park Avenue		250 Seneca Park Avenue	Rochester, New York	United States	43.22552°N 77.60778°W	Substation	
Detroit Edison Lake Orion substation		215 E. Church Street	Lake Orion, Michigan	United States	42.78745°N 83.23695°W	Substation	Constructed in 1926 in Tudor Revival style to match the residential neighborhood.
Peermont Substation		271 61st Street	Avalon, New Jersey	United States	39.07707°N 74.74086°W	Substation	Atlantic City Electric Company substation disguised as a shore house
542 51st Street		542 51st Street	Oakland, California	United States	37.83757°N 122.26371°W	Substation	Pacific Gas and Electric Company substation disguised as a brutalist structure.

== See also ==
- Fake building
- Public utility building
