= Public utility building =

Building housing infrastructure equipment

A public utility building (also known as infrastructure building, and utility building) is a building used by a public utility to maintain its office or to house equipment used in connection to the public utility. Examples include pumping stations, gas regulation stations, and other buildings that house infrastructure components and equipment of water purification systems, water distribution networks, sewage treatment systems, electric power distribution, district heating, telephone exchanges, and public service telecommunication equipment.

== Exterior design strategies ==
=== Decorative cloak ===
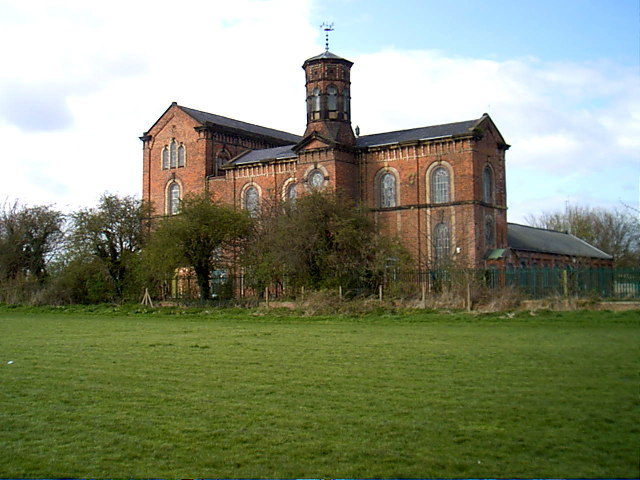
Foundational waterworks style of Springhead Pumping Station

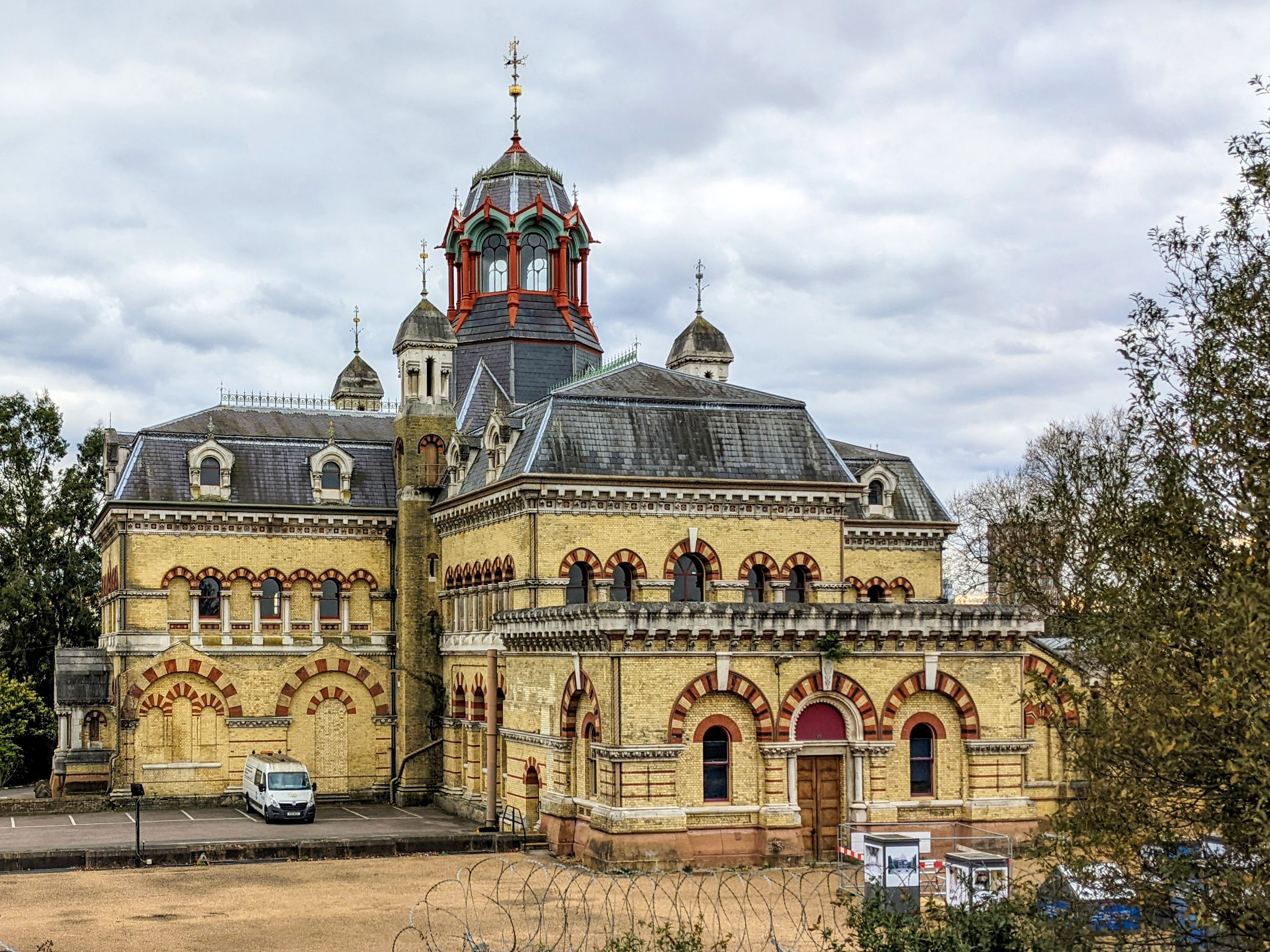
Sacred atmosphere imposed by the design of Abbey Mills Pumping Station

After the Industrial Revolution, cities in industrialized countries were required to construct and maintain infrastructure facilities to support city growth. The modern water industry was one of the early types of city infrastructure, born in the early 19th century out of that necessity. Three types of structures were unique to the water industry: pumping stations (including water and wastewater), water towers, and dams. In particular, the pumping stations that housed large steam engines in the 19th and early 20th centuries were built intentionally to be symbolic. The building architectures were to communicate a message to the public of safety and reliability and express their functions. Building designs inherited from beam engine buildings required strong, rigid walls and a raised floor to support the engines, large arched, multi-story windows to let light in without compromising wall strength, and roof ventilation such as decorative dormers. These functional features formed the principle of "waterworks style." An example of simple waterworks architectural style is Springhead Pumping Station. More elaborate designs were also used to communicate a sacred atmosphere and highlight the importance of critical tasks of the facilities such as in sewage pumping stations. An example is Abbey Mills Pumping Station that employed baroque eclecticism in its design.

The city infrastructure buildings in this period were more communicative and expressive with their own designs without having to conceal their locations from the public. However, the internal machinery is not exposed to the view from public streets as the buildings provide a decorative "cloak" function. Other examples are Radialsystem (Berlin, Germany sewage pumping station), Kempton Park engine house, Chestnut Hill Waterworks in Massachusetts, United States, Spotswood Pumping Station in Melbourne, Australia, Palacio de Aguas Corrientes in Buenos Aires, Argentina, Sewage Plant in Bubeneč, in Prague, Czech Republic, and R. C. Harris Water Treatment Plant in Toronto, Canada. These buildings are considered to be part of the world heritage in the water industry.

Other types of infrastructure facilities had their unique architectural expressions as well. Those include gas supply, electrical supply and communication buildings. An example of electrical substations is seen in a 1931 Commonwealth Edison substation at 115 North Dearborn Street in Chicago. The building completely encloses the equipment but the facade is decorated with a basrelief in Art Deco style. In New York City, many substations built in the 1920s and 1930s to power its subway system incorporated Art Deco ornamental features. These included diamond-patterned brickwork, zigzag motifs, limestone carving of Art Deco lettering, and other incised relief designs.

=== Utilitarian ===
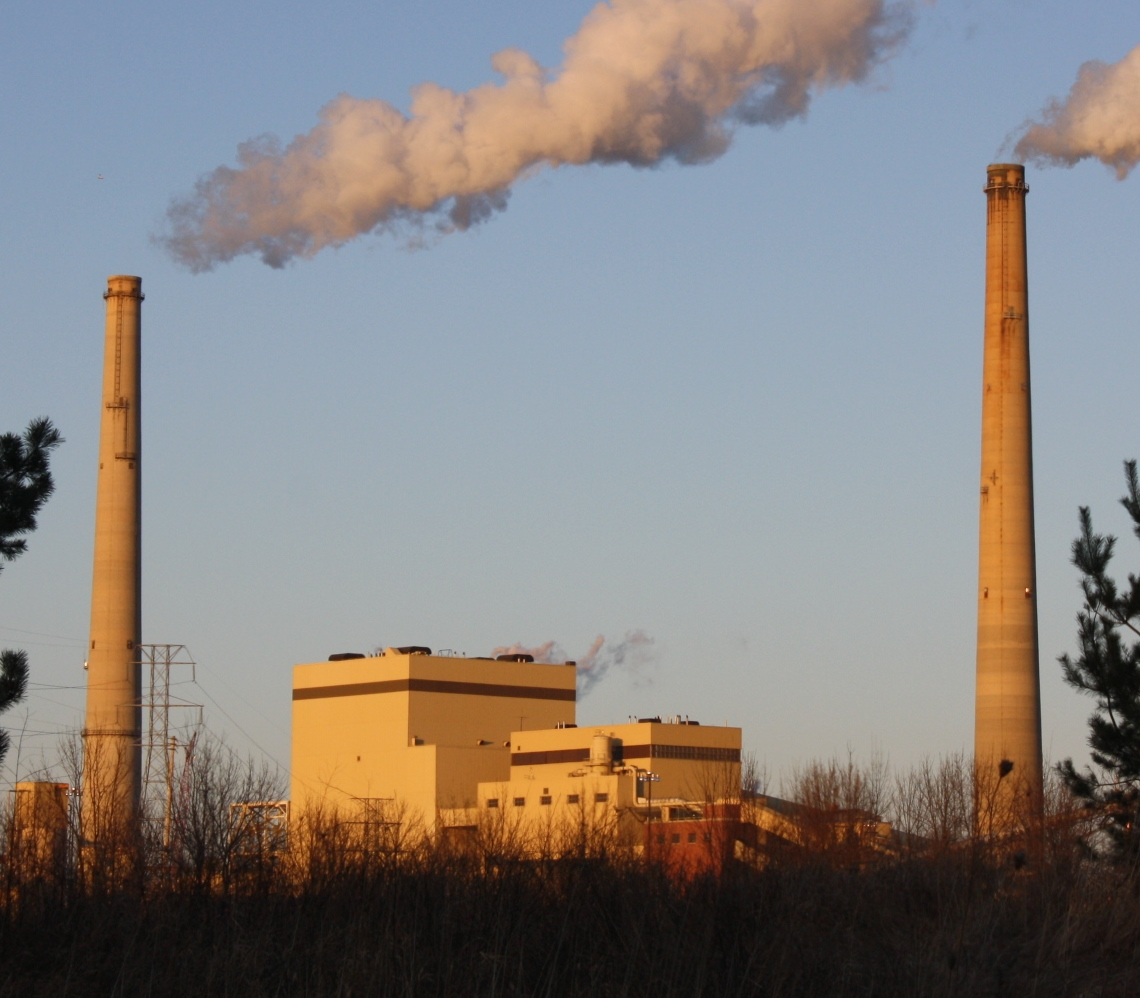
Astylistic utilitarian design of the Edgewater Generating Station buildings

Since the postwar period in the second half of the twentieth century, infrastructure buildings were constructed in utilitarian style. Infrastructure projects including public utility buildings fall within the responsibilities of civil engineers, typically without participation of architects. As a result, the builders of those structures prioritize functional aspects of the buildings without having attention on detailing or ornamentation beyond what are necessary for the functions of the buildings.

=== Functional and anonymous ===
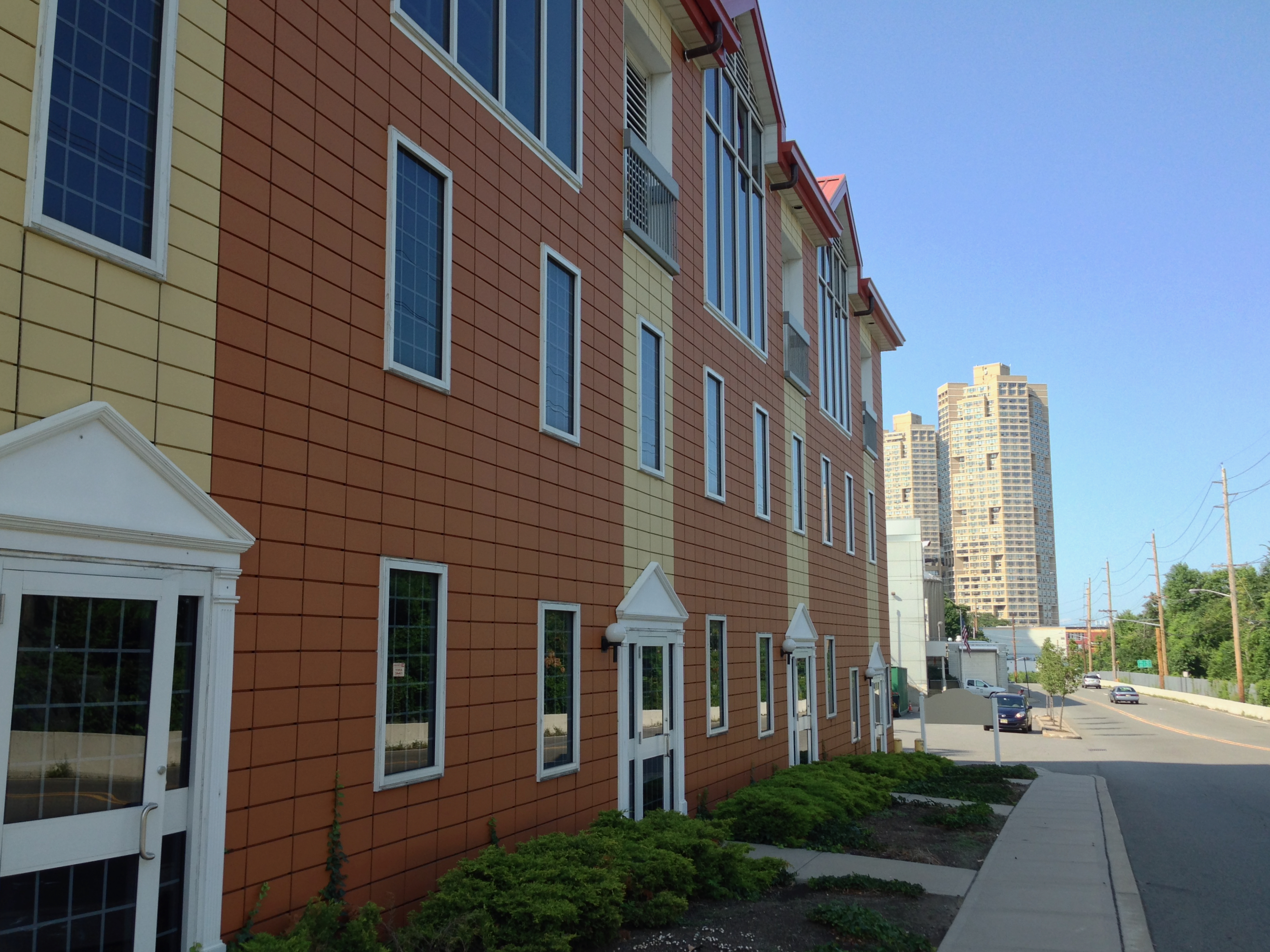
Combined sewer overflow screening facility disguised as townhouses, built in 2009

Many of these public utility buildings need to be close to the users. They may need to be in residential and commercial areas of cities, where the public expects the areas to be aesthetically pleasing to attract residents and visitors. One strategy to hide unattractive equipment is to create enclosures or buildings with exterior designs to disguise and blend into the neighboring buildings. The goal is to ensure the buildings do not stand out so they remain anonymous. In some municipalities, this design decision is mandatory. For example, public utility buildings in residential zones of Montgomery County, Maryland must have an exterior appearance similar to residential buildings.

Large scale implementations of this design strategy can be seen in Toronto and Washington, DC where the electric operators put electrical substations in buildings that are disguised as houses in the neighborhoods (also known as fake houses).

Another example is the 23-story AT&T equipment building at 10 South Canal Street in Chicago. While the ground floor and the top floors have an appearance of a normal skyscraper, the middle 18 floors of the building are windowless concrete to protect the equipment. The architect designed a rough-grooved concrete texture to disguise as windows of typical office buildings.

=== Inspire curiosity ===
Another strategy is to have the exterior of the buildings blend in with the neighborhoods, but there are parts that reveal the existence of the equipment housed inside the building. This strategy is to provide aesthetic compatibility with the areas, but it does not hide the locations of such facilities. An example of this is the Enwave Chiller Building at 137 South State Street in Chicago. The building has a ground-floor retailer compatible with the city's commercial area, but the upper floors house the chillers, pipes, and water tanks which are seen to be too industrialized for the area. The architect sheathed the upper floors with precast concrete walls, glass blocks, and large rounded vents. While that hides the equipment behind the walls, it generates some curiosity for the passersby that the building may be industrial in nature. When the chillers work at night, the building is illuminated with blue light at the roofline to showcase that there is an ice-making operation inside the building.

=== Open and transparent ===
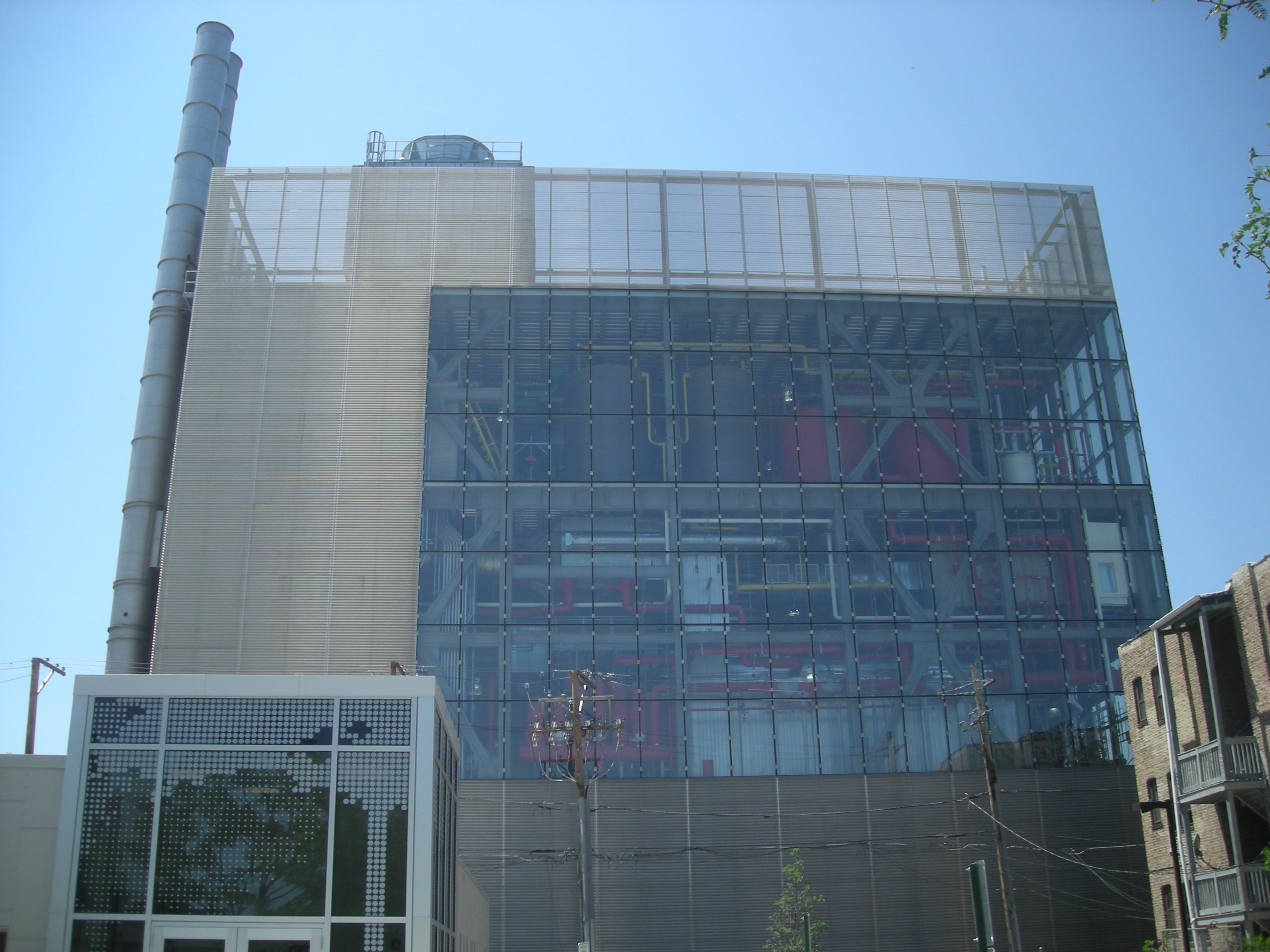
West Campus Combined Utility Plant at the University of Chicago

In the 21st century, some utility operators began to recognize that the internal working machinery of the infrastructure can be seen as an aesthetic to the public. Some infrastructure building designs were more transparent by incorporating glass walls, color-coded pipes, and lights for nighttime illumination. Some examples of such architecture can be seen at the University of Chicago's South Campus Chilling Plant, and West Campus Combined Utility Plant.

=== Distinctive architecture ===
Some of the 21st-century infrastructure buildings were built with an intention to create distinctive architecture. This is an approach to combat the NIMBY (not in my backyard) opposition from the area residents. For example, building a waste-to-energy facility would be considered undesirable for the neighborhoods. With this approach, the waste incineration operator in Roskilde, Denmark employed a Danish architect Erick van Egeraat to create an exterior design that celebrates the city's history. The building facade was designed with two layers, with the inner layer serving the climate protection function. This gave the architect more flexibility in creating the outer decorative layer. Raw umber aluminum panels with laser-cut holes in an irregular pattern was used to create a contemporary look with a connection to the city's industrial and historic heritage. The angular shapes of the lower part of the building were created to resemble factory roofs around the city. The 97-metre (318 ft) spire was a modern take on the city's UNESCO World Heritage site, the Roskilde Cathedral. At night, programming illumination of different color patterns through the facade holes was intended to make the building another landmark of the city.

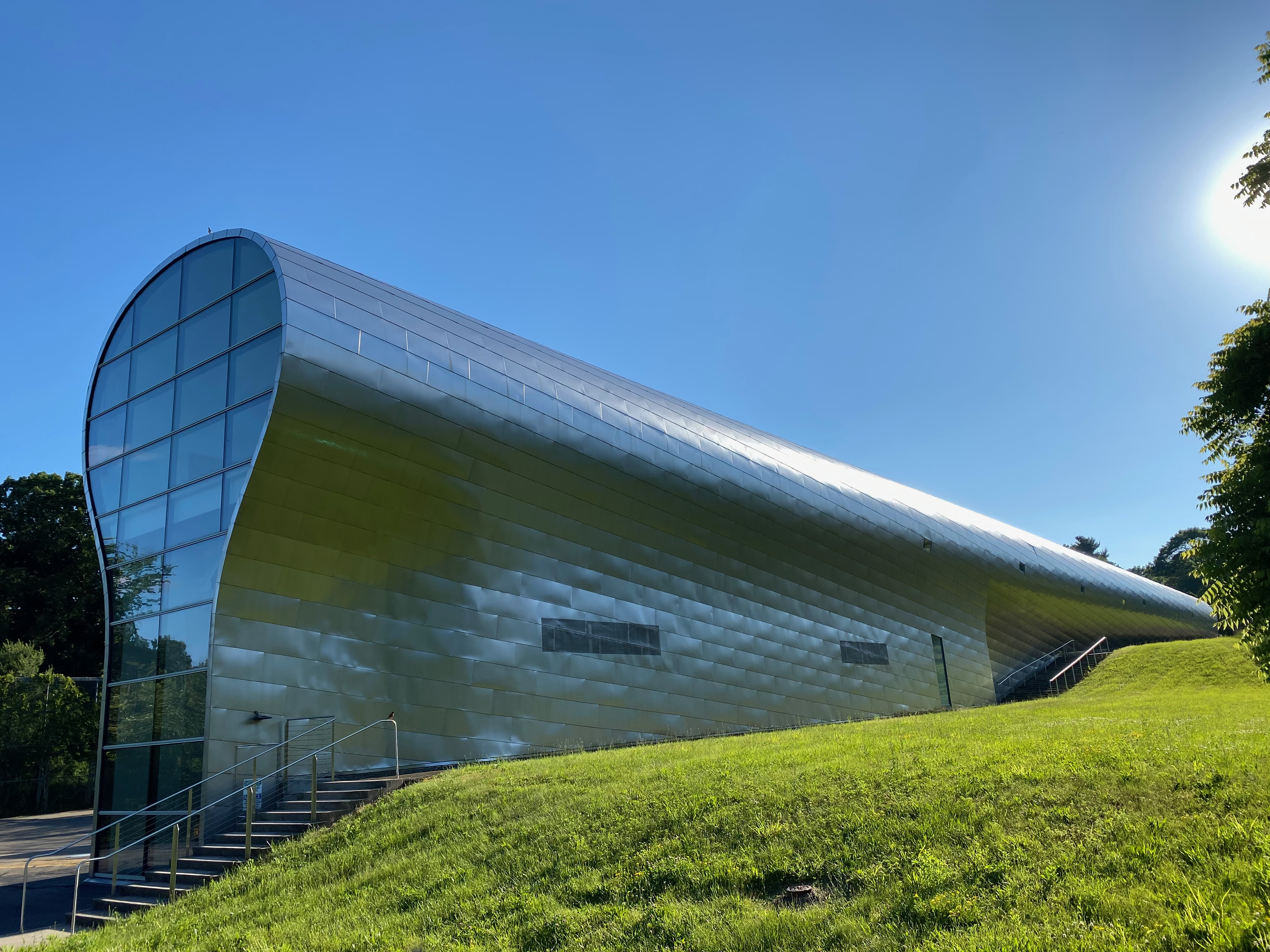
Whitney Water Purification Facility

This approach has also been used elsewhere in the world. In the United States, when the South Central Connecticut Regional Water Authority wanted to build a water filtration plant, the Whitney Water Purification Facility, it invited the public to form a committee to select the architect for the project after some residents voiced objections to the plan. Steven Holl, an award-winning architect, was selected. The project demanded to create a unique structure that would be attractive to the area. The result was a contemporary building with a cross-section of an inverted raindrop shape and its side elevation with an appearance of a large pipe covered in decorative stainless steel shingles. The building was built alongside a landscape design to make the surrounding area a public park. The building's interior included an area accessible to the general public for educational purposes.

In Japan, Hiroshima City spent millions of dollars on building a new incinerator plant. As the city wanted to raise its architectural profile, it hired Yoshio Taniguchi, who designed the Museum of Modern Art in New York City, to work on the incinerator project. The boulevard near the waterfront was extended with a raised glass walkway that ran through the plant to the waterfront. The walkway was built with large glass walls to show the machinery of the plant in a visually pleasing way along with other interactive displays. The design was to create an experience similar to going to a museum.

== Adaptive reuse ==
As technology advanced, the demands for modern equipment types underwent significant transformations. Consequently, the architectural requirements for public utility buildings evolved to accommodate these updated technologies. This shift prompted alterations in both the types and layouts of these structures, rendering some older public utility buildings obsolete. In response to growing environmental concerns and a commitment to historical preservation, there has been a concerted effort to minimize the demolition of outdated buildings and instead explore adaptive reuse as a sustainable alternative. Adaptive reuse involves repurposing existing structures for new functionalities. While numerous success stories highlight the viability of adaptive reuse across various building types, challenges persist in garnering public and financial support for such initiatives, hindering the adoption of this approach in some areas.

== See also ==
- List of fake buildings
