= Leinster Gardens =

Street in London, England

Coordinates: 51°30′45.4″N 0°11′1″W

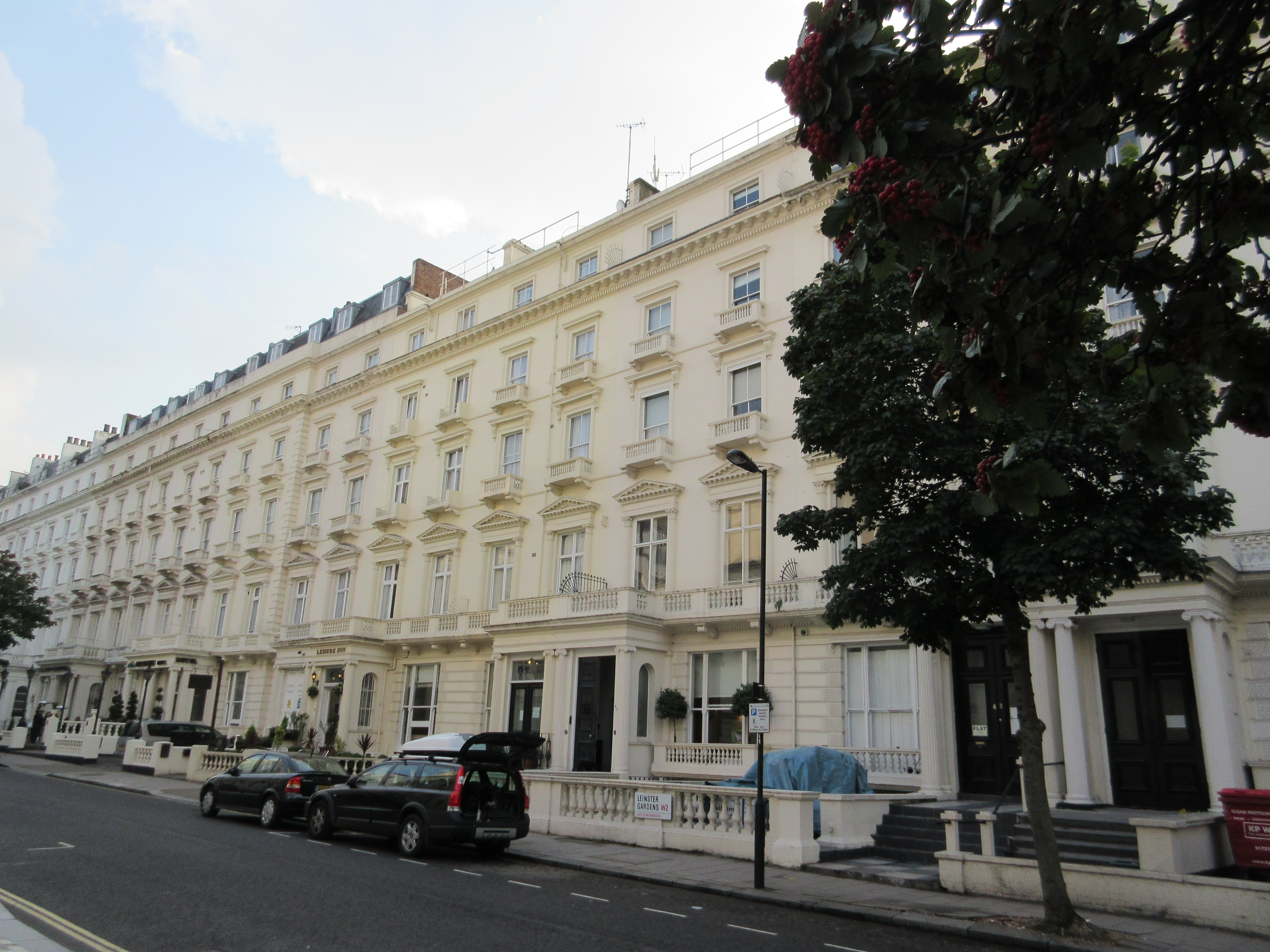
Archetypal houses on the west side of Leinster Gardens

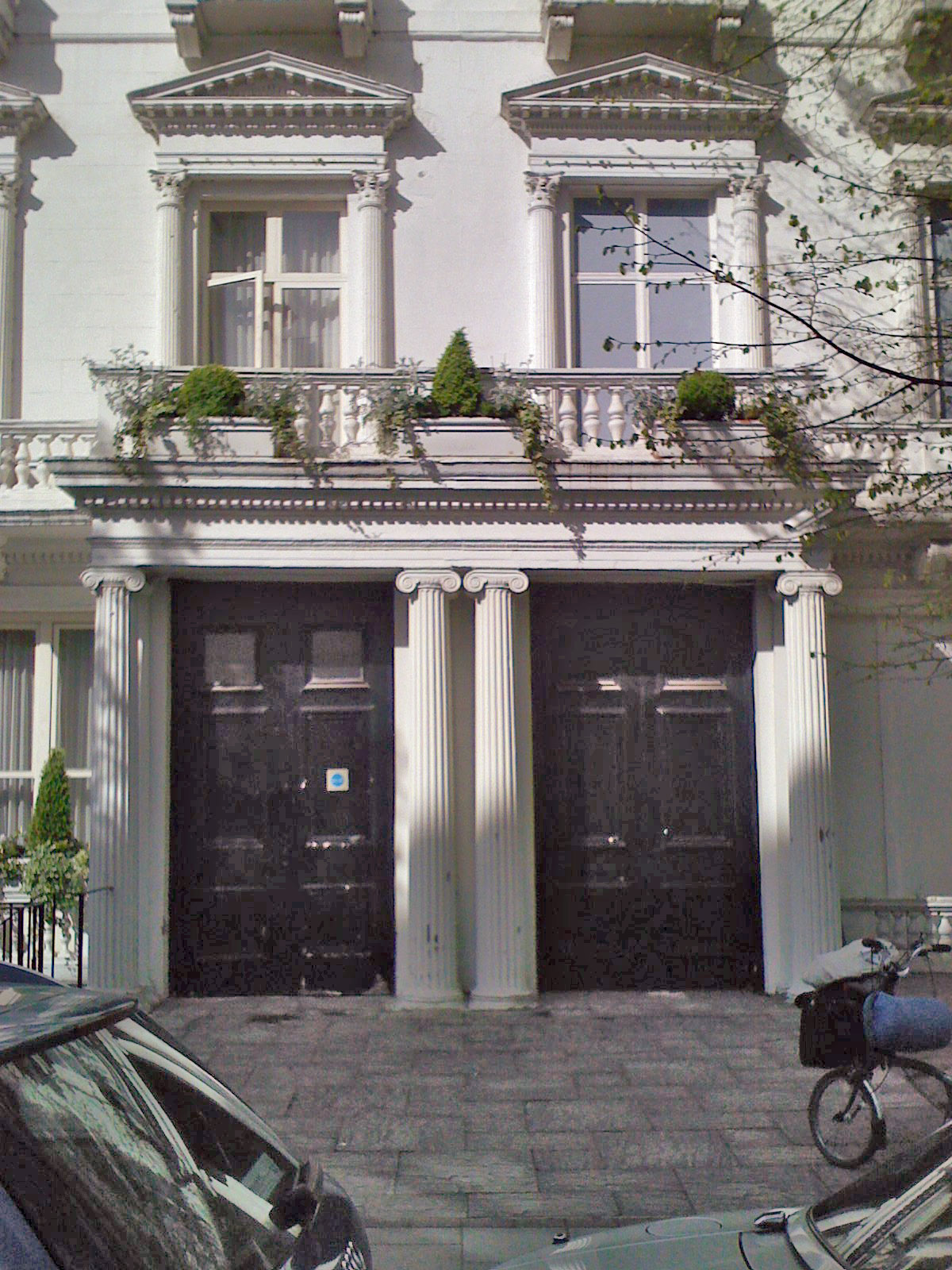
The left-hand 1850s-built property (No. 22) is inhabited. The right-hand one (No. 23) is only a façade. The "windows" are painted grey and the door is false.

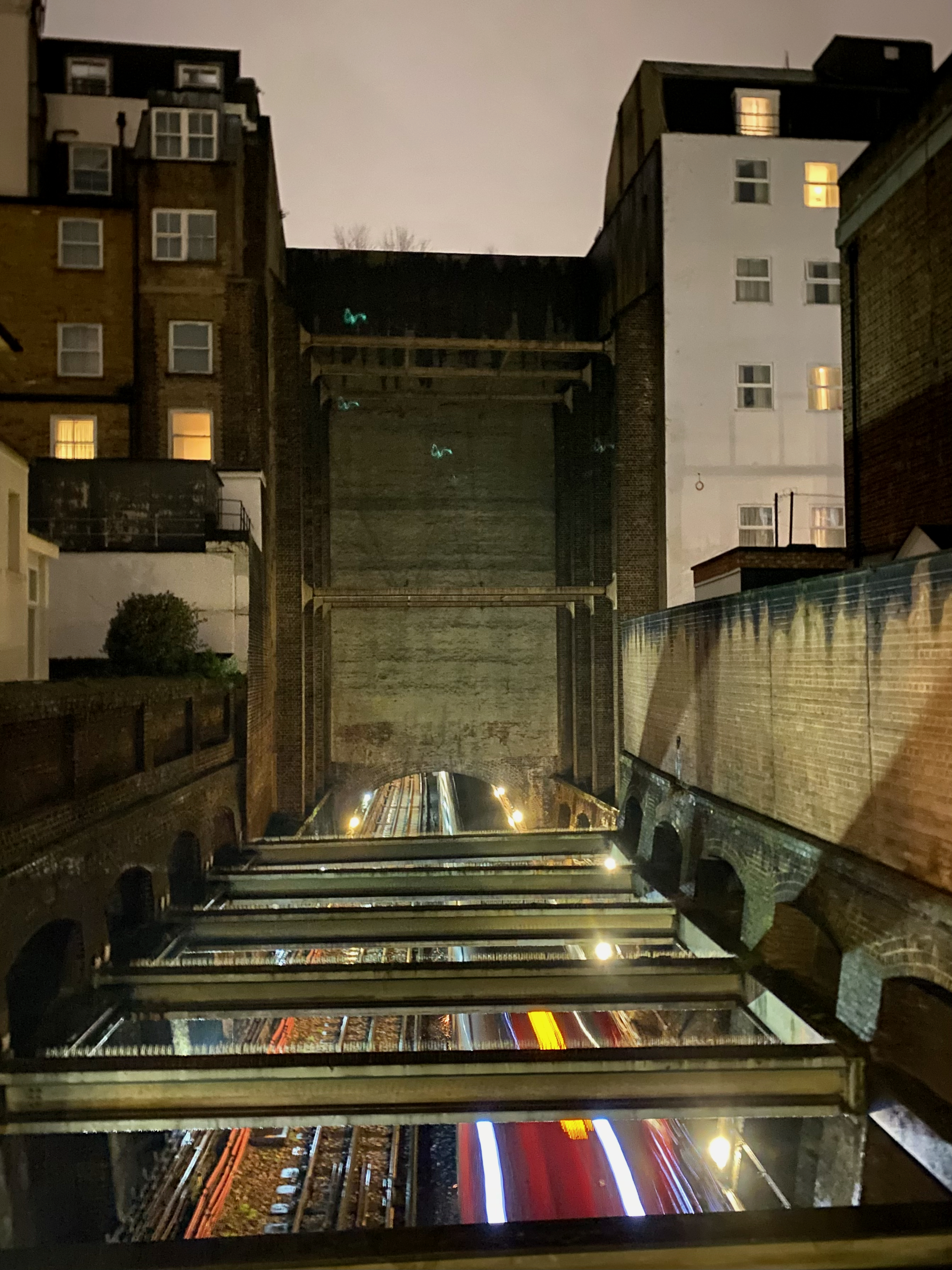
Rear of façade – a tunnel opening, spanning girders and railway tracks

Leinster Gardens is a street in Bayswater, London. It is lined with tall, ornate, mid-Victorian terraced houses, many of which are listed buildings.

== Layout ==
Leinster Gardens is mostly made up of a half-lined avenue lined with tall, ornate, mid-Victorian terraced houses, which include a number of listed buildings. Its thoroughfare status has been curtailed as the road allows only a right-turn into arterial Bayswater Road to the south. Late-twentieth-century apartments built as social housing flank its northern and de facto southern ends. The southern end has shorter Victorian buildings than Leinster Gardens, of yellow brick with white casements and simpler dressings. The southern part of the road is named Leinster Terrace.

Leinster Terrace's east side is Craven Hill Gardens and Lancaster Gate with one exception, its first numbers. These are today in its centre, 16, 17 and 17A: one of which is a listed public house, the Leinster Arms. The street starts opposite Hyde Park with the side elevations of Porchester Lodge/Lancaster Corner (synonym: 100-101 Bayswater Road) which is listed in the middle category (Grade II*) and is marked with a blue plaque to once long-resident writer J. M. Barrie (d. 1937) who wrote Peter Pan. Adjacent, on the west side of the street, is Hyde Park Towers, an eight-storey, dark-brick, Art Deco-inspired block with hexagonal and lozenge projections. This is behind a narrow band of trees, shrubs and railings. Beyond this are shophouses of yellow-brown then yellow brickwork with a crowning cornice (ledge), other white dressings and sash windows (19-34 consecutive), many of which face the main front of Corringham, an architecturally listed, glass-heavy residential block officially in Craven Hill Gardens, designed by Kenneth Frampton (born 1930, in later life, Ware Professor of Architecture at Columbia University), behind which is a private garden. These shophouses are flanked by one-storey restaurants (nos. 18 and 35). A broad alley marks the end of the Leinster Terrace section of the street.

== Toponymy ==
Many Victorian road names in London, apart from Craven Hill, named after owner William Craven, 3rd Baron Craven, are tributes to titles of Dukes, senior Earls, Marquesses and members of the Royal Family. Princes Square and symmetrical, facing Leinster Square are about 500 metres to the north-west of the north end of the street.

Paddington (in which parish grew the newer settlements of Bayswater, Little Venice, Maida Vale and Westbourne) began a trend of names after the provinces of Ireland: Munster, Leinster, Connaught and Ulster. Much of the land belonged to the Bishop of London and his lessees, resulting in necessary Building Acts (of Parliament) in 1804. A policy of regulated subletting to ensure high-quality housing ensued. "The success of the policy was ultimately shown, both in the grandeur of the first new houses in Connaught Place c. 1807 and in the elegance of the terraces put up over the next thirty years."

== False houses ==
The street's listed building middle section has two false houses. These are façades built to match their neighbours: front walls, lightly projecting ionic column-sided porches topped by balustraded balconies, upper-storey sash windows, windows flanked by fluted, half-diameter (semi-circular profile) Corinthian columns and pedimented, higher windows, corniced (white-ledged) with individual balustraded balconies. They are maintained by Transport for London. The false houses – numbers 23 and 24 – have no rooms. Their building accompanied the 1860s construction of the steam engine-driven Metropolitan Railway, and they conceal an area where the tracks are uncovered and trains could release steam. Today, the Circle and District lines run on this section. The result is the illusion of an unbroken terraced row of houses between nos. 22 and 25.

Before electrification the locomotives serving the London Tube were fitted with condensers to reduce the furnaces' carboniferous smoke. Drivers vented off accumulated smoke and condensation in open-air sections. In this upmarket area, the railway company hid this from residents using the frontages incorporated into the prestigious terrace, The façade is 5 feet (1.5 m) thick, behind which is a ground-level opening of the railway line. The façade includes 18 dark-greyed windows and front doors with no letter boxes.

The façade of 23 and 24 played a part in the BBC TV series Sherlock, being used in the episode "His Last Vow".

== See also ==
- 58 Joralemon Street, a false residential built frontage that serves as a vent for a New York City subway line.
- List of fake buildings
