= 58 Joralemon Street =

Subway ventilator in Brooklyn, New York

Coordinates: 40.693543°N 73.997335°W

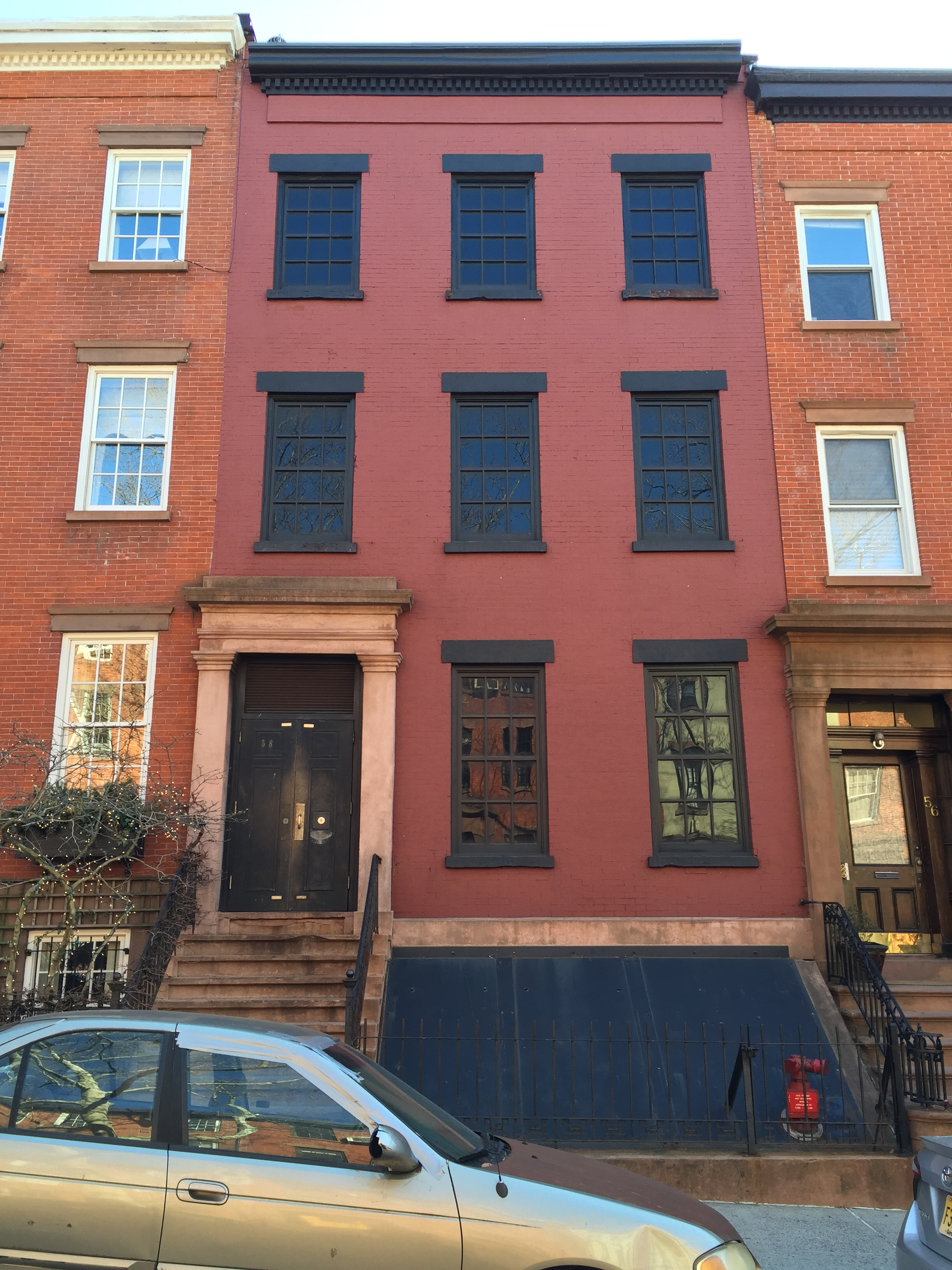
The facade of 58 Joralemon Street

58 Joralemon Street, in Brooklyn Heights, Brooklyn, New York, United States, is a Greek Revival structure built in 1847 as a private residence but is now a New York City Subway vent. The Interborough Rapid Transit Company acquired the property in 1907, gutted the interior, and converted the structure to "the world's only Greek Revival subway ventilator". The ventilator also serves as an emergency exit from the eastern end of the New York City Subway's Joralemon Street Tunnel, which carries the IRT Lexington Avenue Line (4 and 5 trains) between Bowling Green and Borough Hall, where it becomes the IRT Eastern Parkway Line (2, 3, 4, and 5 trains).

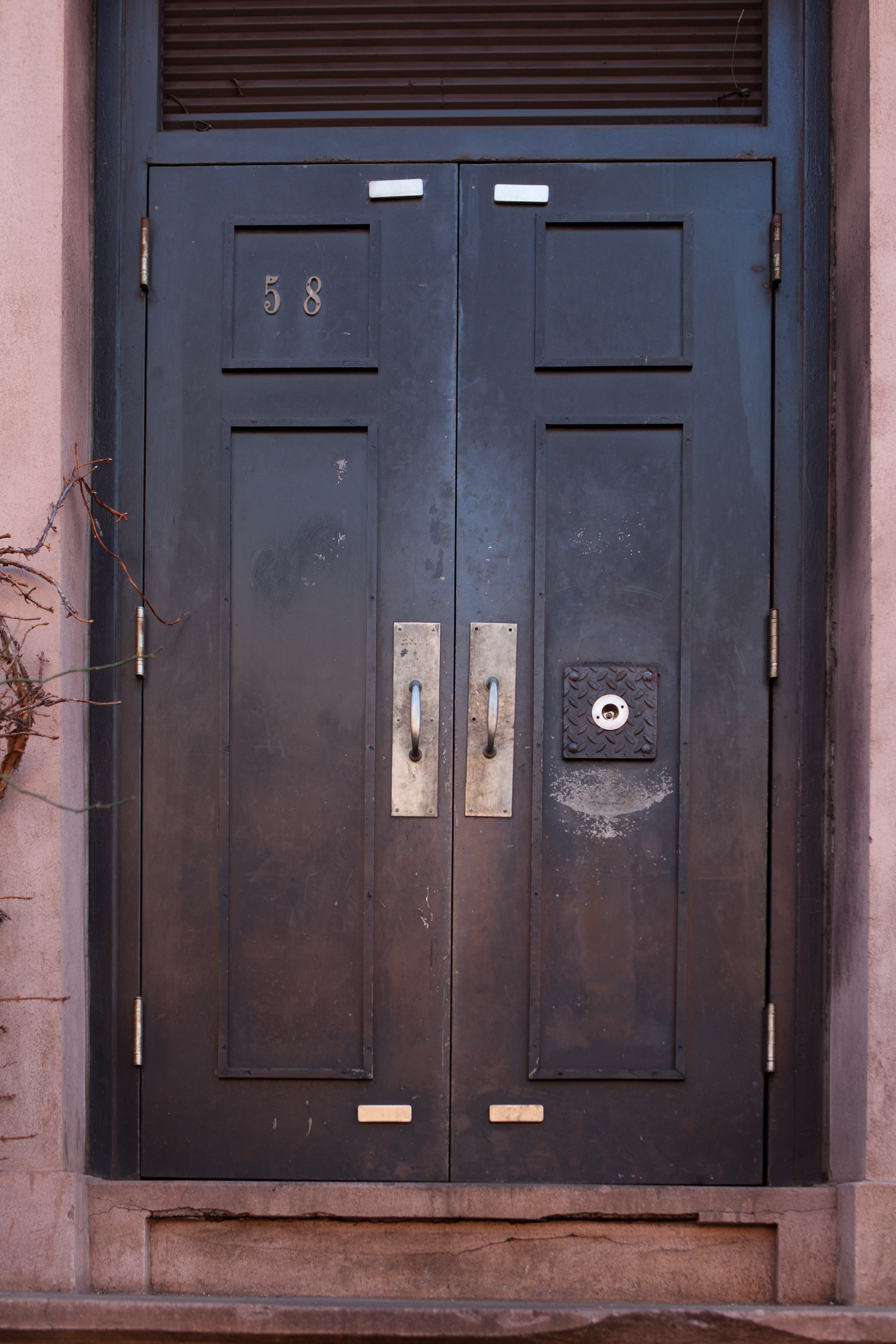
The door to 58 Joralemon

Through acquisitions, the property passed to the New York City Board of Transportation in 1940 and to the New York City Transit Authority in 1953, its current owner. As of 2010 it was valued at $2.8 million. The exterior facade and black Lexan windows are the result of a 1999 agreement with the Landmarks Preservation Commission to help the facility blend into the neighborhood as a fake building, which is a city-landmarked historic district.

== See also ==
- 23-24 Leinster Gardens, a similar mock residential building that serves as a screen for a London Underground route.
- Strecker Memorial Laboratory, another building in New York City that houses transport utilities
- 145 rue La Fayette, a similar ventilation facility in Paris.
- List of fake buildings
