= Joralemon Street Tunnel =

Tunnel under the East River in New York City

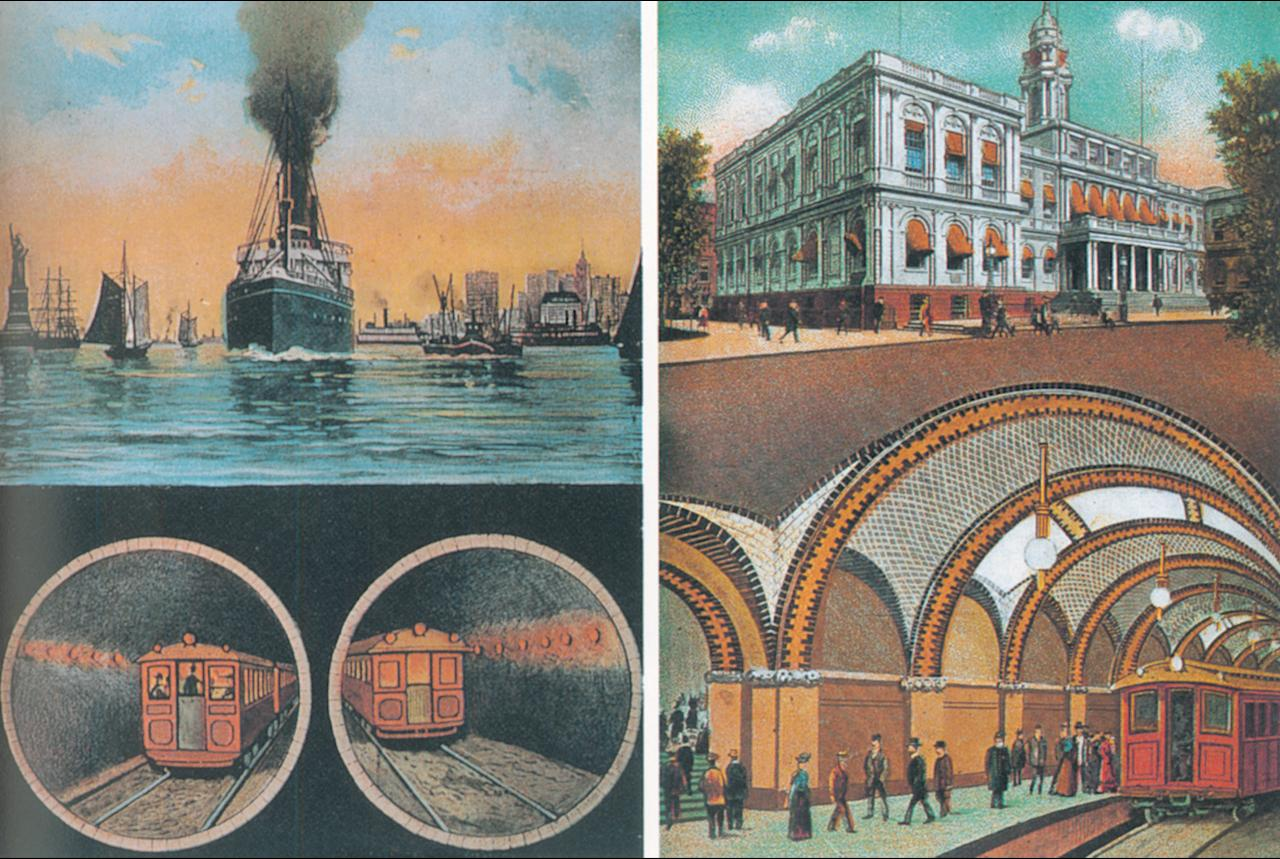
- 1913 postcard illustrating the tunnel and City Hall station
- Interactive map of Joralemon Street Tunnel

Overview
- Line: IRT Lexington Avenue Line (4 and 5 trains)
- Location: East River between Manhattan and Brooklyn, New York
- Coordinates: 40°41′49″N 74°00′26″W
- System: New York City Subway

Operation
- Opened: January 9, 1908; 118 years ago
- Operator: Metropolitan Transportation Authority

Technical
- Length: 6,550 feet (2,000 m)
- No. of tracks: 2
- Width: 16.67 feet (5.1 m) (exterior); 15.5 feet (4.7 m) (interior)
- Joralemon Street Tunnel
- U.S. National Register of Historic Places
- New York State Register of Historic Places
- Architects: William Barclay Parsons; Andrew McDonald, et al.
- MPS: New York City Subway System MPS
- NRHP reference No.: 06000015
- NYSRHP No.: 06101.007663

Significant dates
- Added to NRHP: February 9, 2006
- Designated NYSRHP: September 19, 2005

The Joralemon Street Tunnel (/dʒəˈrælɛmən/, ju-RAL-e-mun), originally the Brooklyn–Battery Tunnel, is a pair of tubes carrying the IRT Lexington Avenue Line (4 and 5 trains) of the New York City Subway under the East River between Bowling Green Park in Manhattan and Brooklyn Heights in Brooklyn, New York City. The Joralemon Street Tunnel was an extension of the Interborough Rapid Transit Company (IRT)'s first subway line from the Bowling Green station in Manhattan to the IRT Eastern Parkway Line in Brooklyn.

The tubes were constructed using the shield method and are each 6,550 feet (2,000 m) long and 15.5 feet (4.7 m) wide. The interiors are lined with cast-iron "rings" formed with concrete. The tubes descend 91 to 95 feet (28 to 29 m) below the mean high water level of the East River, with a maximum gradient of 3.1 percent. During the tunnel's construction, a house at 58 Joralemon Street in Brooklyn was converted into a ventilation building and emergency exit.

The Joralemon Street Tunnel was the first underwater subway tunnel connecting Manhattan and Brooklyn. It was built by the IRT as part of Contract 2, which the IRT signed with the Rapid Transit Commission in 1902. Construction commenced in 1903 and the tubes were completed by 1907, despite various construction accidents and engineering errors that required part of the tunnel to be rebuilt. The first train ran through the Joralemon Street Tunnel in November 1907, and the tunnel opened for passenger service on January 9, 1908. It was listed on the National Register of Historic Places in 2006.

== Description ==
The Joralemon Street Tunnel, consisting of two parallel tubes, crosses the East River, connecting the New York City boroughs of Manhattan in the west and Brooklyn in the east. Completed in 1908 for the Interborough Rapid Transit Company (IRT), it was the first subway tunnel between the two boroughs, and was built as part of Contract 2 of the first New York City Subway line. The tubes extend between South Ferry in Lower Manhattan and Joralemon Street in Brooklyn Heights, Brooklyn, with the route of the tunnel curving at either bank of the river. The primary engineer for the tunnel was William Barclay Parsons, who designed most of the early IRT system, while Clifford Milburn Holland served as the assistant engineer. The New York Tunnel Company was the primary contractor. When completed, it was known as the Brooklyn–Battery Tunnel, a name subsequently used for a vehicular tunnel slightly to the south.

Each tube is approximately 6,550 feet (2,000 m) long, (Note: According to the Brooklyn Daily Eagle, the north tube used 6,747 feet (2,056 m) of cast iron, while the south tube used 6,766 feet (2,062 m) of such material.) with the sections under the river being 4,500 feet (1,400 m) long. The tunnels have an outside diameter of 16.67 feet (5.1 m) and an inside diameter of 15.5 feet (4.7 m). The centers of the tubes were placed about 28 feet (8.5 m) apart, except under Joralemon Street, where that distance is 26 feet (7.9 m). Both tubes have a maximum gradient of 3.1 percent. The lowest points on the tubes are about 91 to 95 feet (28 to 29 m) below the mean high water level of the East River. (Note: Sources disagree on how thick the river bed above the tubes is. According to a 1904 article in the Engineering Record, the river bed above each tube is 6 to 30 feet (1.8 to 9.1 m) thick, but a 1903 account from The New York Times gives a minimum thickness of 25 to 30 feet (7.6 to 9.1 m). A Brooklyn Daily Eagle article in 1907 stated that the maximum depth of the tube was 40 feet (12 m) beneath the river bed.) About 700 feet (210 m) of the tunnel in Brooklyn is above the water level of the river. While the Manhattan end of the tunnels was constructed through solid rock, the Brooklyn end was constructed through sandy ground.

The steelwork for Contract 2 tunnels, including the Joralemon Street Tubes, was manufactured by the American Bridge Company. The tubes are lined with "rings" 22 inches (560 mm) wide, each of which is made of "plates" that form a perfect circle. (Note: According to the National Park Service, there are eight plates in each ring. According to The New York Times and the Engineering Record, there are nine plates, but the topmost plate of each ring is smaller than the rest and is similar in function to the keystone of an arch.) Each ring has a minimum thickness of 1.125 inches (28.6 mm) and has flanges that are 7 to 7.5 inches (180 to 190 mm) deep. The rings within the rocky sections, and within the segments of the tunnel above mean high water, generally weigh less than those placed within sandy ground or underneath the riverbed. After the rings were placed, they were covered with concrete, and bench walls with cable ducts were placed aside each tube. Piping and drainage systems were also installed. Pilings were sunk for additional reinforcement.

When the tubes opened, there were 18 signals, which divided the tubes into fixed blocks; only one train at a time could occupy each block. Trains traveled through the tunnel at up to 60 miles per hour (97 km/h), requiring blocks of up to 2,400 feet (730 m). The placement of each signal was determined by the grade of each tube. Trains could run through either tube in both directions if the other tube was closed for maintenance. The signal apparatuses were powered by batteries at either end of the tunnel.

=== Associated structures ===
The Manhattan end of the tunnel is the Bowling Green station of the IRT Lexington Avenue Line. North of Bowling Green, the subway runs under Broadway to connect to the original subway line. The Brooklyn end is at Joralemon and Clinton Streets in Brooklyn, where a cut-and-cover tunnel connects to the Borough Hall station of the IRT Eastern Parkway Line.

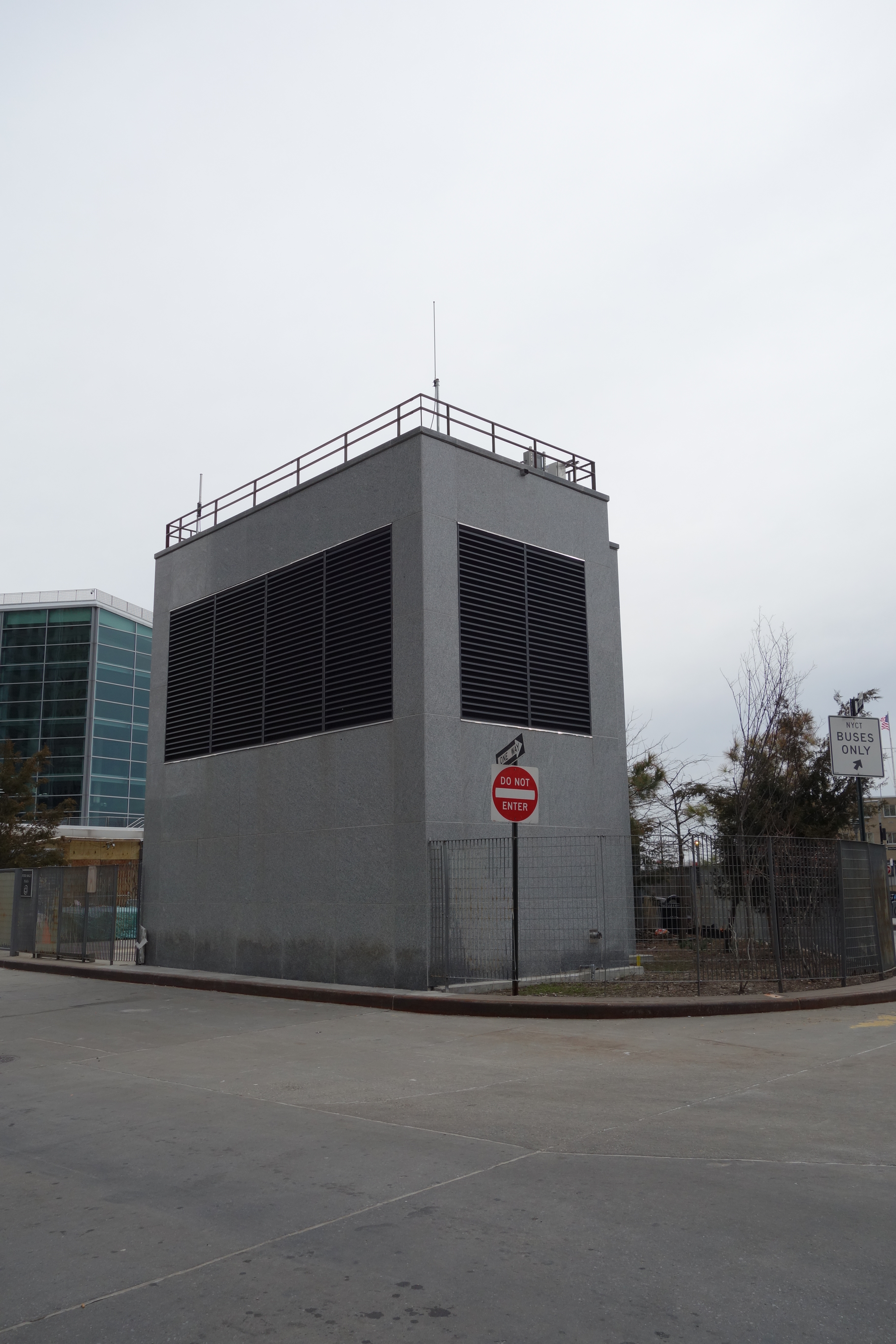
South Ferry ventilation shaft

Two construction shafts were built for the tunnel: one in Manhattan at South Ferry, and the other in Brooklyn at Henry and Joralemon Streets. Each shaft was built with dimensions of about 14 by 45 feet (4.3 by 13.7 m). The South Ferry construction shaft became a ventilation shaft and consists of a 10-foot-high (3.0 m) enclosure inside the Battery. However, the Henry Street construction shaft was infilled. A ventilation and emergency exit shaft was built inside a row house at 58 Joralemon Street, near Willow Street. 58 Joralemon Street was an actual house, built in 1847, but was purchased by the IRT in 1907 and gutted.

== History ==
=== Planning ===
Planning for the city's first subway line dates to the Rapid Transit Act, authorized by the New York State Legislature in 1894. The subway plans were drawn up by a team of engineers led by William Barclay Parsons, chief engineer of the Rapid Transit Commission (RTC). It called for a subway line from New York City Hall in lower Manhattan to the Upper West Side, where two branches would lead north into the Bronx. A plan was formally adopted in 1897. The Rapid Transit Subway Construction Company (RTSCC), organized by John B. McDonald and funded by August Belmont Jr., signed Contract 1 with the RTC in February 1900, in which it would construct the subway and maintain a 50-year operating lease from the opening of the line. Belmont incorporated the IRT in April 1902 to operate the subway.

A subway under the southernmost section of Broadway between the Battery and City Hall was not included in Contract 1. Several days after Contract 1 was signed, the Board of Rapid Transit Railroad Commissioners instructed Parsons to evaluate the feasibility of extending the subway south to South Ferry and then to Brooklyn. On January 24, 1901, the Board adopted a route that would extend the subway from City Hall to the Long Island Rail Road (LIRR)'s Flatbush Avenue terminal station (now known as Atlantic Terminal) in Brooklyn, via a tunnel under the East River, then running under Joralemon Street, Fulton Street, and Flatbush Avenue in Brooklyn to Atlantic Terminal. It was estimated that this second route would cost $9 million (equivalent to $278 million in 2025 (Note: Johnston, Louis; Williamson, Samuel H. (2023). "What Was the U.S. GDP Then?". MeasuringWorth. United States Gross Domestic Product deflator figures follow the MeasuringWorth series.)), which the RTC could not yet fully fund. However, the RTC expected that there would be competition for the route, which connected two large business districts and the city's two most populous boroughs. The Brooklyn Rapid Transit Company, which monopolized surface and elevated transit in Brooklyn, would be obliged to bid to maintain its monopoly. The Board also knew that Belmont would submit a low bid to retain control of underground rapid transit for himself and his construction company. Contract 2, giving a lease of 35 years, was executed between the commission and the Rapid Transit Construction Company on September 11, 1902.

=== Construction ===
Construction on the Manhattan side began on March 4, 1903, and on the Brooklyn side on July 10, 1903. While the RTC had allocated $2 million to the tubes' construction (equivalent to $57 million in 2025), the project was estimated to cost $10 million (equivalent to $287 million in 2025) by November 1903. Construction shafts were dug at South Ferry and Joralemon Street. Six tunneling shields were driven: two proceeding east from Manhattan and two each proceeding west and east from Brooklyn. The tunneling shields were each 16.95 feet (5 m) in diameter and 9.5 feet (2.9 m) long, and were pushed at a rate of 5 to 12 feet (1.5 to 3.7 m) per day. All of the headings were driven within a pressurized environment. After the headings had been driven approximately 100 feet (30 m), two thick brick walls were constructed at each end, creating air locks. An upper lock gave workers access to the heading, while a lower lock allowed spoils to be extracted from the excavation and through the shafts on either side. The work was performed by three groups of men, each working eight-hour shifts.

After the shields were driven, temporary wooden beams were placed to reinforce the excavations until the cast-iron tubes were assembled. The cast iron lining was assembled via a hydraulically powered, traveling device with a "radial arm"; the device was supported on brackets that ran along the completed section of the lining. Once it had been positioned, the radial arm would lift and orient a plate into position. Three workers would bolt the plates to the already assembled lining, while a fourth would operate the device. Afterward, a compressed-air grouting machine would squeeze grout into small holes within the lining, filling the spaces between the rock and the cast-iron rings. The holes in the lining were then plugged. Some of the cast-iron plates were cracked while they were placed, but Parsons maintained that the tubes were safe.

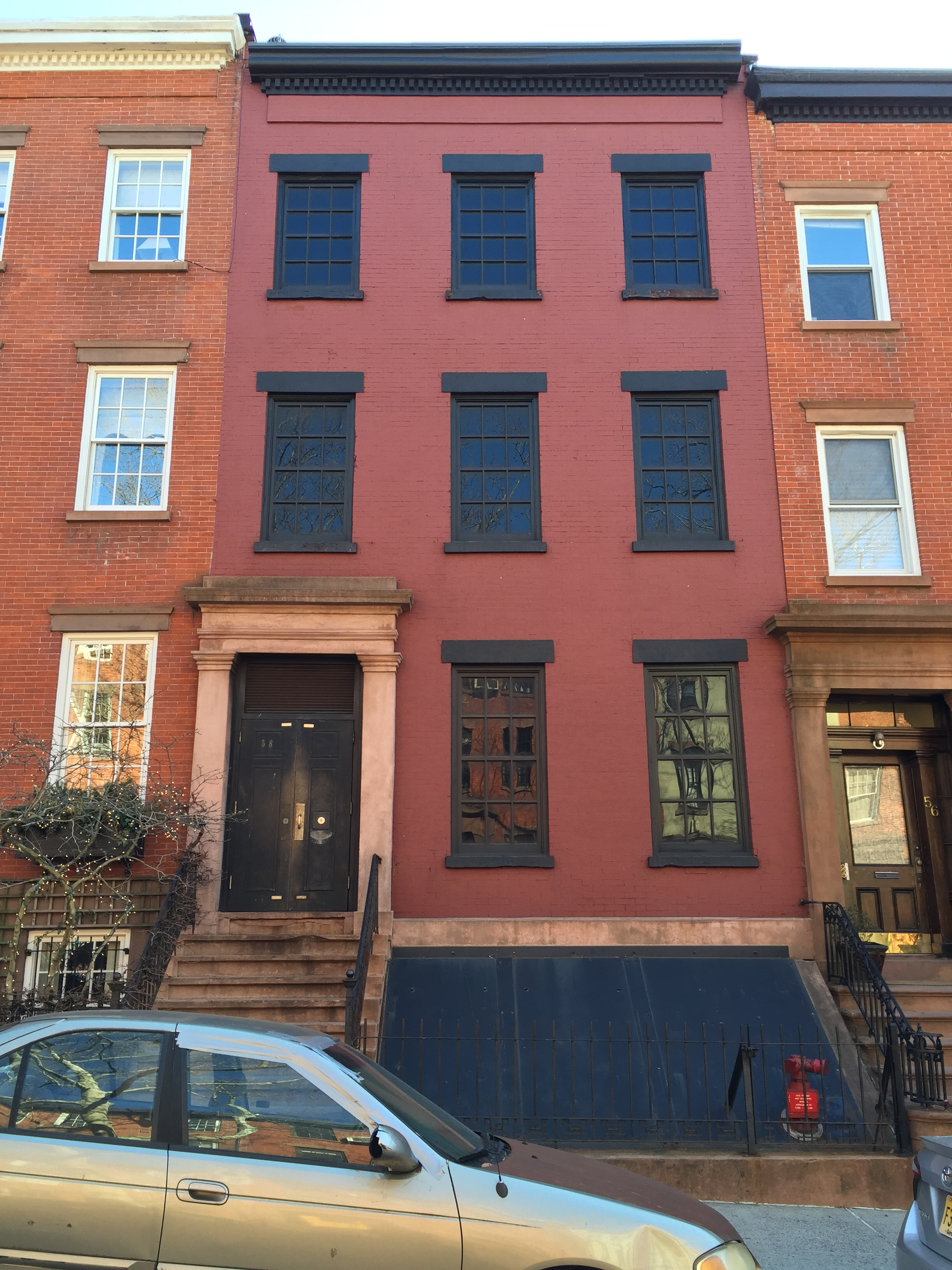
This house at 58 Joralemon Street was purchased and converted into a ventilation shaft for the Joralemon Street Tunnel.

The excavations caused shifting of sandy soil, which damaged some buildings in Brooklyn along the tunnel's route, including the house of the Brooklyn borough president. In June 1904, the RTC said the city was not responsible for repairs to the houses, although contractors were digging another shaft to relieve air pressure in the excavation. The shafts at Garden Place and at Henry Street were sealed, and new shafts at Furman Street on the waterfront were being constructed, by the end of 1904. The property damage led the New York City government to pay out monetary compensation starting in mid-1906. Numerous other accidents occurred during the course of construction. In March 1905, one of the tubes suddenly lost pressure in a "blowout", propelling a worker through the mud and into the air, although he survived. That December, a blast caused the tunnel to cave-in at the Battery, though no one died. A cave-in occurred in one of the tubes in August 1906, and two months later, another blast killed one worker. Another issue was the need to create a new ventilation shaft on the Brooklyn side after the construction shaft was sealed; the IRT unsuccessfully attempted to take property on Hicks and Furman Streets. By 1907, the IRT had bought a house at 58 Joralemon Street to serve as the ventilation plant.

Continuing with the excavations, the contractors found the remains of a ship under Joralemon Street in March 1905. By that August, the excavations had reached the midpoint of the riverbed. During this time, Parsons and his successor George S. Rice discovered that the ceilings of the tubes had flattened downward; trains could still run through the tunnels, but the roofs would be scraped at high speeds. Less urgently, the tunnels in Brooklyn had descended beneath the specified gradient, which if uncorrected would result in an uneven grade. These difficulties had come to the attention of mayor George B. McClellan Jr. by mid-1906. To prevent further delays, contractor New York Tunnel Company chose to proceed, with plans to rebuild the defective tunnel sections later. Parsons blamed the contractor for the defective tube ceilings, stating that the New York Tunnel Company had allowed the quicksand above the tubes to settle, although the contractor denied responsibility.

The two sections of the northern tube were holed-through on December 15, 1906, followed by the southern tube on March 1, 1907. Starting in mid-1907, some 1,957 feet (596 m) of the north tube and 962 feet (293 m) of the south tube were reconstructed, with the lower half of each cast-iron ring being replaced with an elliptical section. (Note: A total of 2,919 feet (890 m) was reconstructed; the National Park Service cites this figure as the length of the north tube that was reconstructed.) The New York Tunnel Company became insolvent that May, and a receiver was appointed to oversee the completion of the tunnel. By that July, the city's Public Service Commission ordered that additional shifts of workers be hired for the Joralemon project so that test trains could start running through the tunnels within three months. The first test train, carrying officials, reporters, and construction engineers, ran through the Joralemon Street Tunnel to Brooklyn at 12:40 p.m. on November 27, 1907.

=== Operation ===
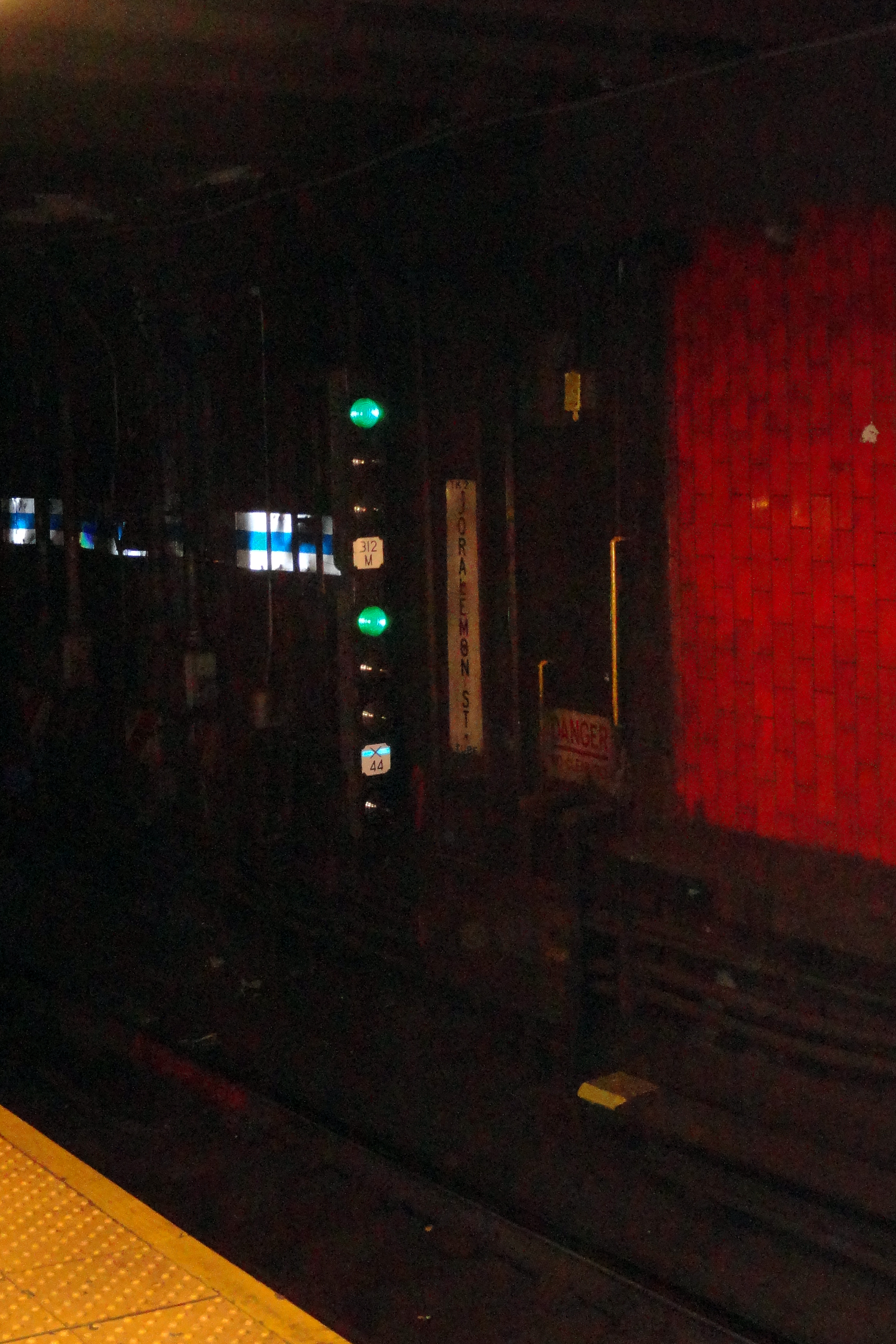
The beginning of the tunnel just south of the Bowling Green station

The Joralemon Street Tunnel and the Borough Hall station opened to the public on January 9, 1908, with ceremonies, firecrackers, and a musical performance on the steps of Brooklyn Borough Hall. Initially, the tunnel was served by express trains along both the West Side (now the Broadway–Seventh Avenue Line to Van Cortlandt Park–242nd Street) and East Side (now the Lenox Avenue Line). The express trains, running to Atlantic Avenue, had their northern terminus at 242nd Street or West Farms (180th Street). Lenox local trains to 145th Street served the tunnel during late nights. In Brooklyn, service proceeded beneath Joralemon, Fulton, and Willoughby Streets, originally terminating at Atlantic Avenue. The opening of the Joralemon Street Tunnel, as well as the completion of the Williamsburg Bridge and Manhattan Bridge to the north, relieved traffic from the Brooklyn Bridge and from East River ferries, which previously had provided the only passenger service between Manhattan and Brooklyn.

The Dual Contracts were formalized in early 1913, specifying new lines or expansions to be built by the IRT and the BRT. As part of the Dual Contracts, the IRT extended the Lexington Avenue Line north of Grand Central–42nd Street, dividing the original IRT line into an H-shaped system. The "H" system opened in 1918, and all Joralemon Street Tunnel services were sent via the Lexington Avenue Line. The following year, the Clark Street Tunnel opened north of the Joralemon Street Tunnel, providing service from the newly extended Broadway–Seventh Avenue Line to the IRT's Brooklyn line. Another tunnel, the Montague Street Tunnel, was built north of the Joralemon Street Tunnel as part of the Dual Contracts, opening in 1920 as part of the BRT system. Also in 1920, the Eastern Parkway Line was extended east of Atlantic Avenue; the Joralemon Street Tunnel services, which had previously served all stops on the Eastern Parkway Line, became express services.

In the latter half of the 20th century, several derailments occurred in the Joralemon Street Tunnel. A Brooklyn-bound train derailed during the morning rush hour of January 1, 1965, blocking service for half a day, although no one was harmed. During the evening rush hour of March 17, 1984, another train derailed with 1,500 passengers while traveling over a track that was being repaired, but again, no one was killed or seriously injured.

The Joralemon Street Tunnel was added to the National Register of Historic Places in 2006. It was one of seven East River subway tunnels flooded on October 29, 2012, as Hurricane Sandy's storm surge inundated Lower Manhattan. The Metropolitan Transportation Authority (MTA) prioritized draining and restoring service to the Joralemon Street Tunnel and Rutgers Street Tunnel, which carried some of the system's busiest routes. The tunnel reopened within the week. The tunnels were more extensively repaired during 2016 and 2017 for $75 million. The MTA announced in 2024 that it would begin installing 5G cellular equipment in the Joralemon Street Tunnel; the project was completed in October 2025.
