= Strecker Memorial Laboratory =

Building in Manhattan, New York

- U.S. National Register of Historic Places
- New York State Register of Historic Places
- New York City Landmark
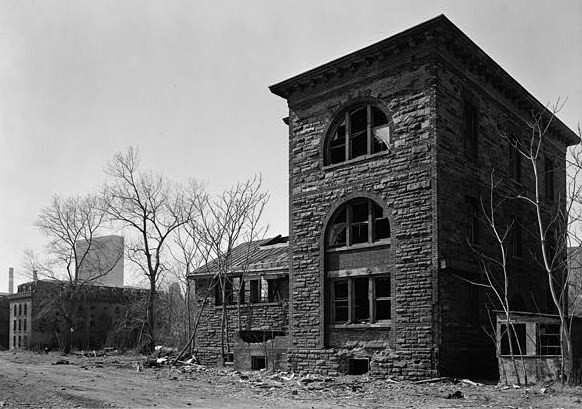
- East side in 1970

- Location within New York City
- Location: Roosevelt Island, New York, New York
- Coordinates: 40°45′8″N 73°57′29″W
- Area: less than one acre
- Built: 1892
- Architect: Withers & Dickson
- NRHP reference No.: 72000886
- NYSRHP No.: 06101.000497
- NYCL No.: 0909

Significant dates
- Added to NRHP: March 16, 1972
- Designated NYSRHP: June 23, 1980
- Designated NYCL: March 23, 1976

Strecker Memorial Laboratory is a historic building at Southpoint Park on Roosevelt Island in New York City. Built in 1892 to serve as a laboratory for City Hospital, it was "the first institution in the nation for pathological and bacteriological research". The project was funded by the Strecker family. The building was designed by architects Frederick Clarke Withers and Walter Dickson in the Romanesque Revival style with large arched windows to provide plenty of natural lighting and ventilation. On the first floor were an autopsy room and an office, while the floor above housed laboratories where specimens were examined. The cellar was used as a mortuary and for storage. Administrative support was provided by the nearby City Hospital. An additional storey was later built, providing room for the examination of histological samples, a scientific library and a pathology museum.

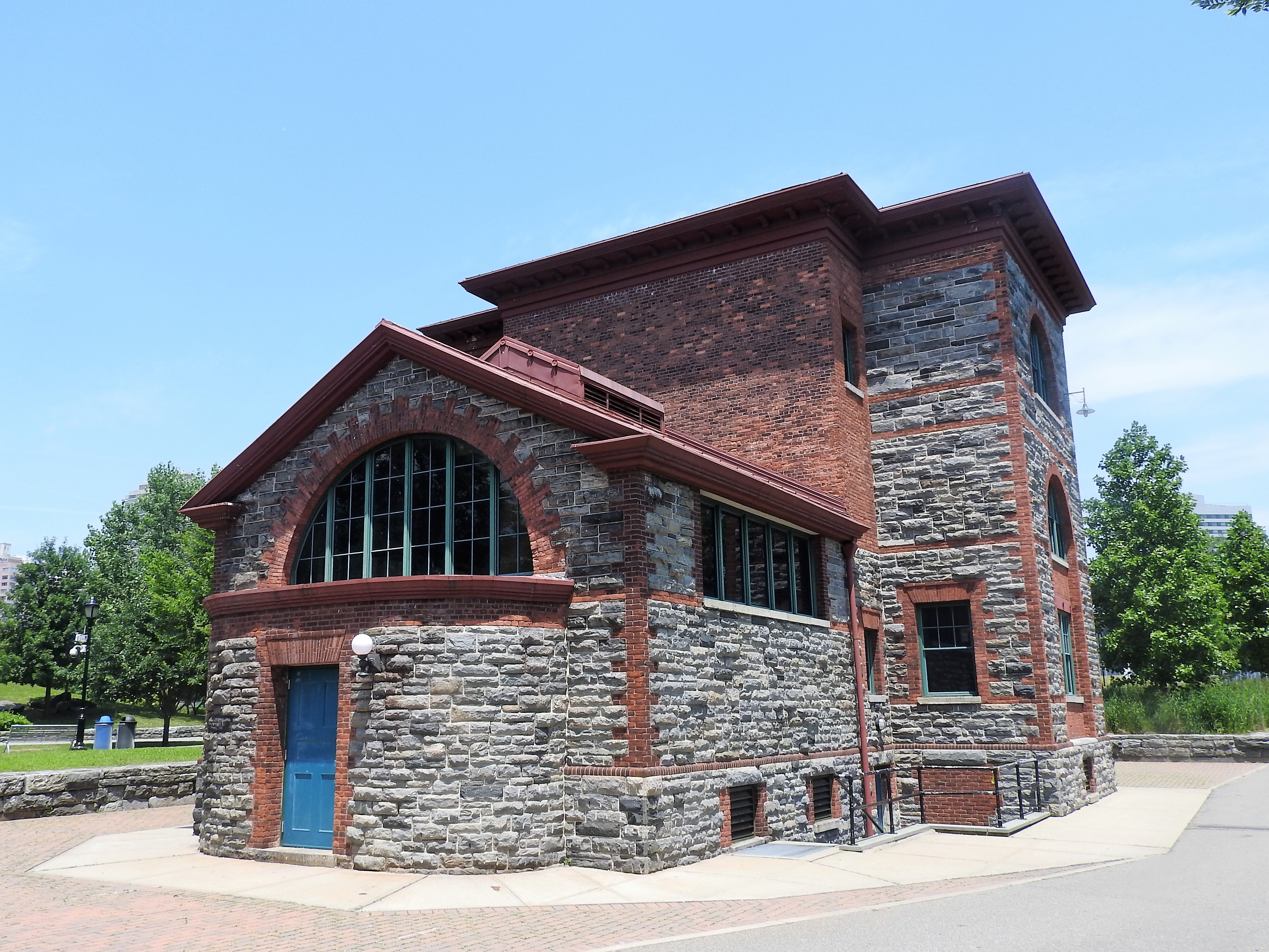
South side, after renovations in 2010

In 1907, the Russell Sage Institute of Pathology took over the running of the lab. In time, this became associated with the Rockefeller University, and work continued at the laboratory until it closed in the 1950s, after which it fell into disrepair.

In 1972, it was added to the National Register of Historic Places, and in 1976 it was designated a New York City landmark.

The Metropolitan Transportation Authority purchased the building in the late 1990s to house a power conversion substation for the subway trains that run through the 53rd Street Tunnel underneath Roosevelt Island. The MTA restored the building's exterior, and the substation has been active since 2000.

== See also ==
- List of New York City Designated Landmarks in Manhattan on islands
- National Register of Historic Places listings in Manhattan on islands
- 58 Joralemon Street, another building in New York City that houses transport utilities
- Fake building
