= Springhead Pumping Station =

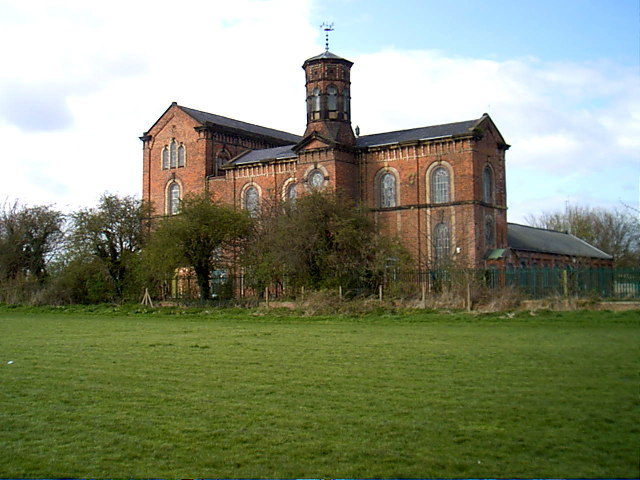
- The main building in 2005
- Interactive map of the Springhead Pumping Station area

General information
- Status: repurposed to become a museum
- Type: pumping station
- Architectural style: Waterworks Style
- Location: Springhead Lane, Hull, England, Hull, England
- Coordinates: 53.7506°N 0.4214°W
- Completed: 1863

Design and construction
- Engineer: Thomas Dale

Listed Building – Grade II*
- Designated: 21 January 1994
- Reference no.: 1219405

Springhead Pumping Station was a pumping station in Hull in England. It later became a waterworks museum.
