= Sewage plant in Bubeneč =

National monument in Prague , Czech Republic

- Čistírna odpadních vod v Bubenči
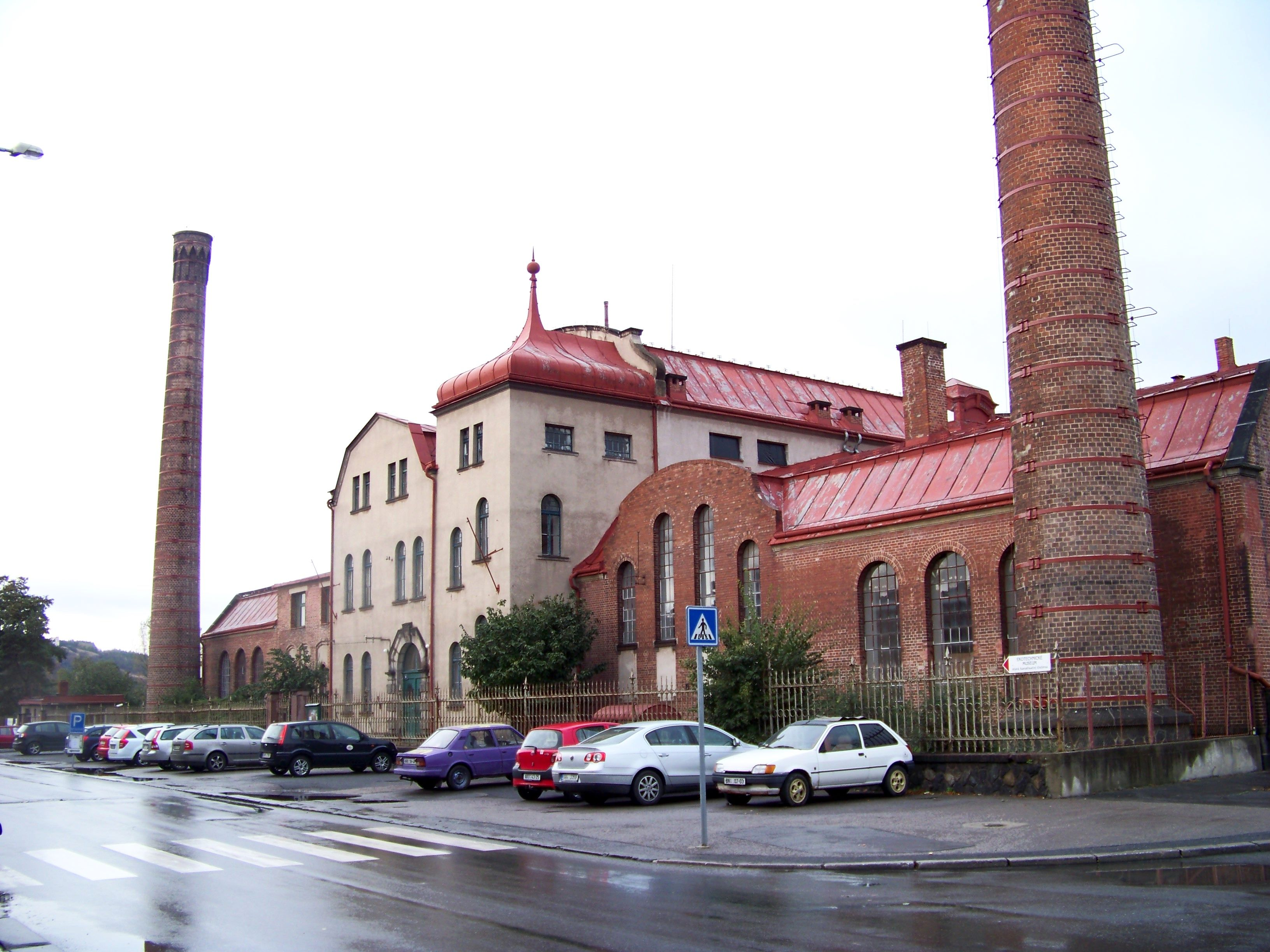
- Location: Prague 6, Prague
- Coordinates: 50°06′36″N 14°24′08″E
- Website: https://www.staracistirna.cz/en/

The sewage plant in Bubeneč (Czech: Čistírna odpadních vod v Bubenči) is the oldest sewage treatment plant in Prague, designed by William Heerlein Lindley and built between 1895–1906. In 1991, the building was declared a protected national monument and has been converted into the Eco-Technical Museum.
