= Blackwell Island Light =

Lighthouse in Manhattan, New York

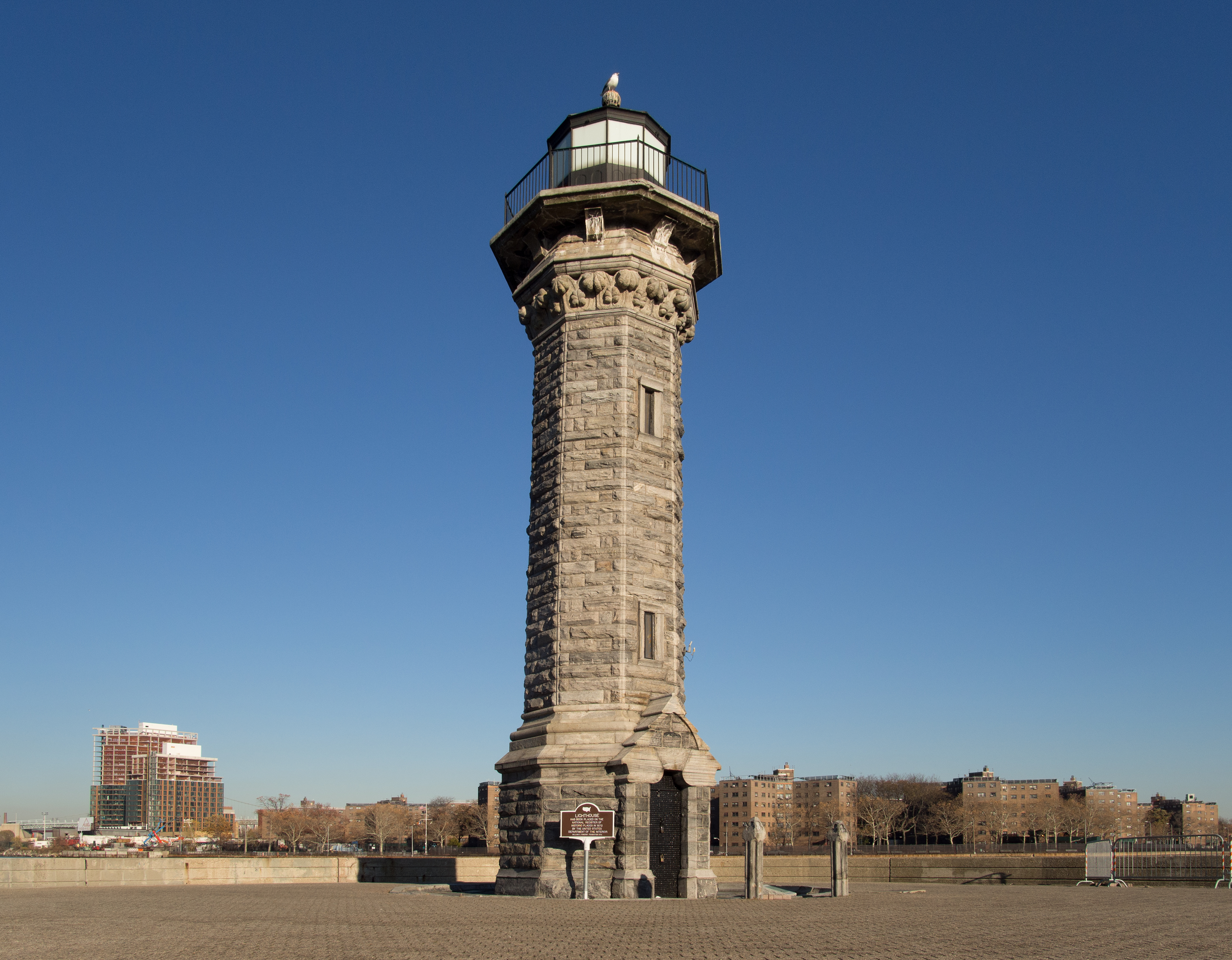
- Blackwell island Light in 2017
- Location: Roosevelt Island, New York, New York
- Coordinates: 40°46′22″N 73°56′24.6″W

Tower
- Constructed: 1872
- Foundation: stone
- Construction: stone
- Height: ca. 50 feet (15 m)
- Shape: octagonal tower
- Heritage: New York City Landmark, National Register of Historic Places listed place, New York State Register of Historic Places listed place

Light
- First lit: 1872
- Deactivated: 1940
- Lighthouse
- U.S. National Register of Historic Places
- New York State Register of Historic Places
- New York City Landmark
- Area: less than one acre
- Architect: James Renwick Jr.
- Architectural style: Gothic Revival
- NRHP reference No.: 72000876
- NYSRHP No.: 06101.000500
- NYCL No.: 0911

Significant dates
- Added to NRHP: March 16, 1972
- Designated NYSRHP: June 23, 1980
- Designated NYCL: March 23, 1976

Blackwell Island Lighthouse (now Roosevelt Island Lighthouse, also formerly Welfare Island Lighthouse) is a stone lighthouse built by the government of New York City in 1872. It is within Lighthouse Park at the northern tip of Roosevelt Island in the East River. It was named to the National Register of Historic Places on March 16, 1972 and was designated a New York City Landmark on March 23, 1976.

== History ==
Blackwell Island (known as Welfare Island from 1921 to 1973; now Roosevelt Island) is located in the middle of the East River, within the modern borough of Manhattan. The island was purchased by the city government in 1828. Various facilities on the island were built including a penitentiary, almshouse, city hospital, the New York Lunatic Asylum, and the Smallpox Hospital.

In 1872, the City of New York built a lighthouse. The supervising architect was James Renwick Jr., who also designed several other buildings on the island for the Charities and Correction Board as well as more famous works such as St. Patrick's Cathedral.

Legends abound about the construction of the lighthouse. Two names, John McCarthy and Thomas Maxey, are associated with the various legends. The 1870 report of the warden of the lunatic asylum indicated that an industrious patient had built a seawall near the Asylum that had reclaimed land. The legends indicate that an inmate of the asylum built a fort to defend the island against a British invasion that he feared. Some versions indicate that he had incorporated Civil War cannons. The legend indicates that the builder was bribed with bogus money to demolish the fort for the construction of the lighthouse. Other stories indicate that an Asylum inmate constructed the lighthouse. For many years, a saying was inscribed on a stone near the lighthouse:

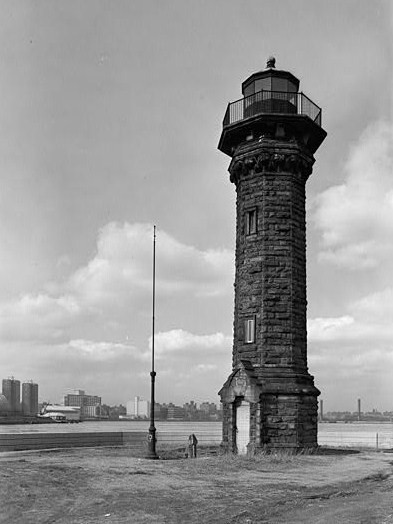
Blackwell Island Light in 1970

This is the work
Was done by
John McCarthy
Who built the Light
House from the bottom to the
Top All ye who do pass by may
Pray for his soul when he dies.

The lighthouse was operated by the City instead of the U.S. Lighthouse Board. In its 1893 annual report, the Lighthouse Board generally praised the operations of Blackwell Island Lighthouse, but indicated that the Board had been unfairly criticized because of the City's occasional failure to keep the light in operation. The Board advocated banning private lights. The 1917 U.S. Coast Pilot indicated that there was a private light at the north end of the island.

The light was operated until about 1940. In the 1970s, the lighthouse was partially restored. The restoration was completed in 1998. A second restoration project commenced in 2021 which changed the design of the lantern and lamp bell on the roof as well as a working decorative lens. The project was completed in 2022 to coincide with the lighthouse's 150th anniversary.

== Architecture ==
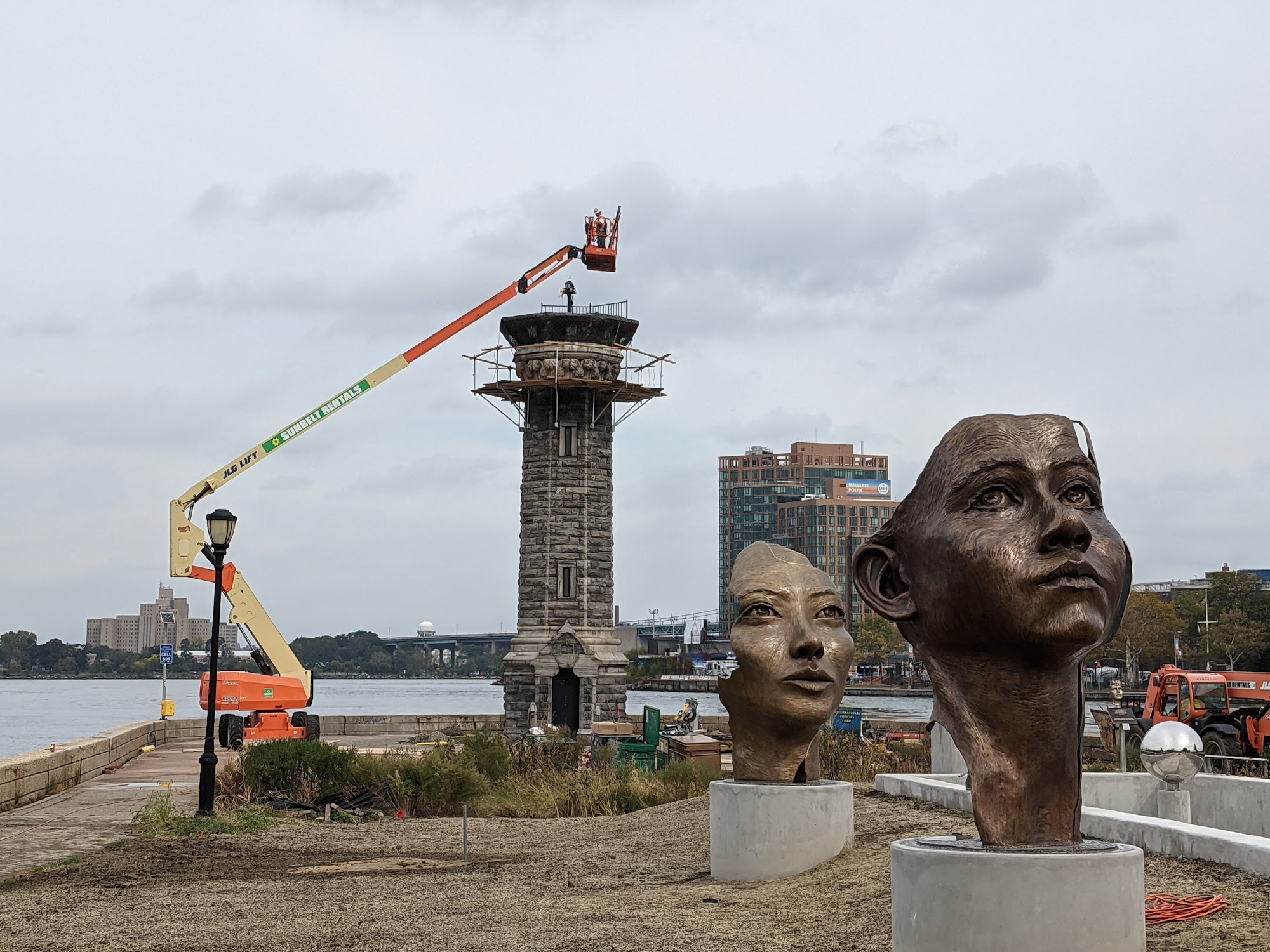
Maintenance of the Blackwell Island Light, including temporary removal of the lighthouse cap and gallery railings, on October 25, 2021.

The lighthouse is approximately 50 feet (15 m) tall. It is constructed of gray gneiss, rough ashlar that was quarried on the island by inmates from the penitentiary. It has an octagonal base and an octagonal shaft. There is an entrance on the south side under a projecting gable and a pointed Gothic arch. Two south-facing slit windows in the shaft light the interior. At the top of the shaft there is a band of ornamented corbels below the gallery, which is surrounded by an iron railing. The lantern is octagonal with a shallow conical roof. An 1893 photograph and a 1903 movie show that it probably had a much taller, steeper conical cap when it was built. The optics were provided by the U.S. Lighthouse Board.

== In popular culture ==
The lighthouse appears as a location in the video games Blackwell Unbound and The Blackwell Convergence as the "Roosevelt Island Lighthouse."

== See also ==
- List of New York City Designated Landmarks in Manhattan on smaller islands
- National Register of Historic Places listings in Manhattan on islands
