= Block House (Governors Island) =

- U.S. National Register of Historic Places
- New York City Landmark
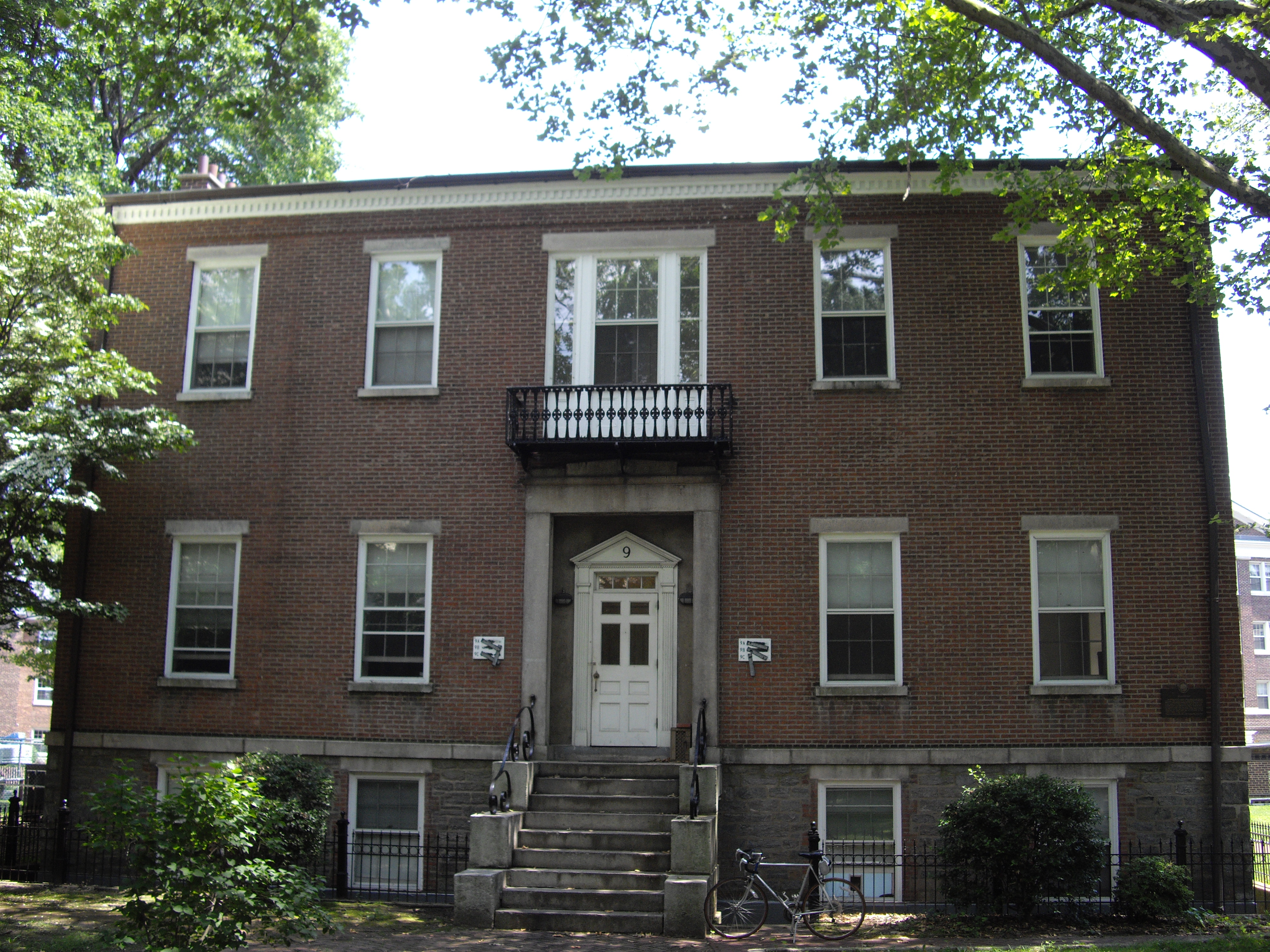
- Location: New York, New York
- Coordinates: 40°41′20″N 74°0′50″W
- Area: less than one acre
- Built: 1843
- Architect: Martin E. Thompson
- Architectural style: Greek Revival
- NRHP reference No.: 72000863
- NYCL No.: 0544

Significant dates
- Added to NRHP: July 24, 1972
- Designated NYCL: September 19, 1967

The Block House, also known as Building 9 and the Governors Island Post Hospital, is a brick building in the Nolan Park area of Governors Island in New York Harbor, New York City. Its name is due to its early use as a prison. Ulysses S. Grant was briefly stationed there early in his military career.

Building 9 was constructed in 1839 in the Greek Revival style and was initially used as the Post Hospital. The roof of the building was originally flat, but was replaced with a hip roof in 1864 because the flat roof would leak. Ten years later, two wings for patient wards were built because the original structure was so poorly ventilated. In 1878–1879, Building 9 was converted to offices for the Military Division of the Atlantic and the Department of the East. The building was used for various Army commands until the 20th century, and by 1947, the structure was converted to four sets of officers' quarters.

Building 9 is two-stories with a red-brick facade, raised above a high schist basement. Brick paths lead from Nolan Park to the front entrance. The entrance is surrounded with granite around pedimented wood, which in turn enclosed a paneled wood door. There is a wrought-iron balcony immediately above the front entrance; the back formerly had a similar entrance design, which is now a window. The windows are six-over-six and contain granite lintels and window sills.

== See also ==
- List of New York City Designated Landmarks in Manhattan on Islands
- National Register of Historic Places listings in Manhattan on islands
