= List of New York City Designated Landmarks in Manhattan on smaller islands =

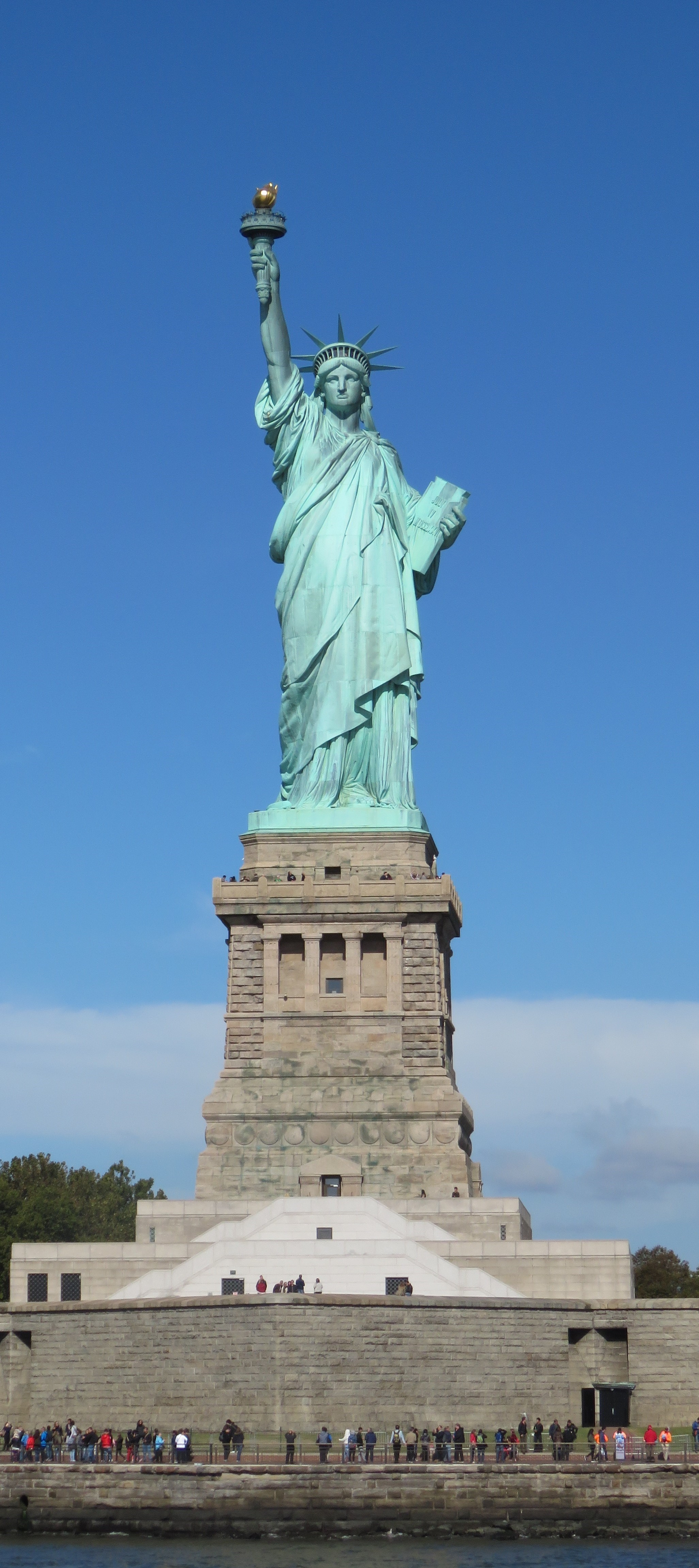
The Statue of Liberty on Liberty Island is one of several New York City Designated Landmarks that are located on smaller islands in Manhattan.

The New York City Landmarks Preservation Commission (LPC), formed in 1965, is the New York City governmental commission that administers the city's Landmarks Preservation Law. Since its founding, it has designated over a thousand landmarks, classified into four categories: individual landmarks, interior landmarks, scenic landmarks, and historic districts.

The New York City borough of Manhattan consists of the main island of Manhattan; the neighborhood of Marble Hill, located on the North American mainland; and several smaller islands. The LPC has designated fifteen landmarks on four smaller islands in Manhattan, including two historic districts, twelve individual landmarks, and one interior landmark. These designations comprise two on Ellis Island, six on Governors Island, one on Liberty Island, and six on Roosevelt Island. The designations include the Statue of Liberty, a national monument, as well as numerous buildings that are all also on the National Register of Historic Places (NRHP).

== Context ==
The New York City borough of Manhattan contains numerous smaller islands in addition to the main island of Manhattan. Three of these islands, Ellis Island, Governors Island, and Liberty Island, are located in Upper New York Bay, though jurisdiction of Ellis Island is shared with neighboring Jersey City, New Jersey, and Liberty Island is an exclave of Manhattan within New Jersey. There are also several islands in the East River, including U Thant Island, Roosevelt Island, Mill Rock, and Randalls and Wards Islands, which are legally part of Manhattan.

The New York City Landmarks Preservation Commission (LPC) is the New York City governmental commission that administers the city's Landmarks Preservation Law. Formed in 1965, the commission administers four types of landmarks: individual landmarks, which consist of the exteriors of objects or structures; interior landmarks, which consist of the interiors of structures; scenic landmarks, which include city-owned "parks or other landscape features"; and historic districts, which consist of geographically cohesive collections of buildings with a distinct architectural style. Some are also on the National Register of Historic Places (NRHP), a separate program administered by the National Park Service. As of May 2024, the LPC has designated 156 historic districts, 1,460 individual landmarks, 121 interior landmarks, and 12 scenic landmarks.

The smaller islands in Manhattan contain two historic districts, twelve individual landmarks, and one interior landmark. Both historic districts contain landmarks within them: the Ellis Island Historic District includes one interior landmark while the Governors Island Historic District contains five individual landmarks. As of May 2024, all twelve individual landmarks on Manhattan's smaller islands are on the NRHP; Ellis Island and the Statue of Liberty are also part of the Statue of Liberty National Monument, and all landmarks on Governors Island are also part of the Governors Island National Monument. In addition, the Statue of Liberty is a World Heritage Site designated by UNESCO, and both the Statue of Liberty and Ellis Island are on the New Jersey Register of Historic Places.

== History ==
The LPC designated its first landmarks on smaller islands in Manhattan during 1967, when five buildings on Governors Island were given individual-landmark status. The LPC subsequently gave individual-landmark status to six buildings on Roosevelt Island in March 1976; the structures included a house, a lighthouse, a chapel, and three former hospitals. That September, the LPC also designated the Statue of Liberty as a city landmark. The LPC designated the entirety of Ellis Island as a historic district in 1993, although most of the island is in New Jersey. The interior of the registry room inside Ellis Island's main building was also designated at the same time. In 1997, the LPC designated 90 acres (36 ha) of Governors Island as a historic district, which included approximately 100 buildings. The designation overlays that of the five individual landmarks that had been previously designated.

Despite the protections given by the LPC, some landmarks have fallen into decay after their designations. These landmarks have included the Octagon Tower, Blackwell House, and Smallpox Hospital on Roosevelt Island. The Octagon Tower was incorporated into an apartment complex in 2005 after the LPC approved the tower's renovation.

== Historic districts ==
Landmark name	Image	Date listed (Note: The number below each date is the number assigned to each location by the Landmarks Preservation Commission. The landmark designation report can be viewed by clicking the number.) (Note: For an interactive map, refer to "Discover New York City Landmarks". New York City Landmarks Preservation Commission – via ArcGIS.)	Location	Island	Description
Ellis Island Historic District	Ellis Island Historic District	November 16, 1993 (#1902)	40°41′58″N 74°02′30″W	Ellis Island	A group of some 30 structures that formed the Ellis Island federal immigration station.: Note: Part of the island is in New Jersey. The district is also overlaid by the Statue of Liberty National Monument.
Governor's Island Historic District	Governor's Island Historic District	June 18, 1996 (#1946)	40°41′26″N 74°00′59″W	Governors Island	A group of over 100 structures that were used by the U.S. military continuously for over two centuries.: Note: The district is overlaid by the Governors Island National Monument.

== Individual landmarks ==
All of these individual landmarks are also listed on the NRHP.

Landmark name	Image	Date listed	Location	Island	Description
The Admiral's House	The Admiral's House	September 19, 1967 (#0546)	Nolan Park; 40°41′25″N 74°00′50″W	Governors Island	Used by the commanding officers of the Army and Coast Guard units.
Blackwell House	Blackwell House	March 23, 1976 (#0912)	501 Main Street; 40°45′38″N 73°57′05″W	Roosevelt Island	Built in 1796 by a descendant of the first English owner of the island.
Block House	Block House	September 19, 1967 (#0544)	Nolan Park on Barry Road; 40°41′20″N 74°00′51″W	Governors Island	A small military prison on Governors Island.
Castle Williams	Castle Williams	September 19, 1967 (#0547)	Hay Road and Andes Road; 40°41′34″N 74°01′11″W	Governors Island	A circular 19th century fortification of red sandstone on the northwest point of Governors Island, part of a system of forts to protect New York City from naval attack.
Chapel of the Good Shepherd	Chapel of the Good Shepherd	March 23, 1976 (#0907)	543 Main Street; 40°45′42″N 73°57′02″W	Roosevelt Island	A historic Episcopal church designed by architect Frederick Clarke Withers, now known as the Good Shepherd Community Ecumenical Center.
Fort Jay	Fort Jay	September 19, 1967 (#0543)	Quadrangle Road; 40°41′29″N 74°00′59″W	Governors Island	A 1794 coastal star fort, built to defend New York Harbor.
The Governor's House	The Governor's House	September 19, 1967 (#0545)	Building 2, Andes Road; 40°41′27″N 74°00′48″W	Governors Island	A historic house on Governors Island.
Lighthouse	Lighthouse	March 23, 1976 (#0911)	North end of Roosevelt Island; 40°46′22″N 73°56′26″W	Roosevelt Island	An 1872 lighthouse located at the northeast tip of Roosevelt Island in the East River.
The Octagon	The Octagon	March 23, 1976 (#0910)	888 Main Street; 40°46′08″N 73°56′38″W	Roosevelt Island	Originally serving as the main entrance to the New York City Lunatic Asylum, which opened in 1841, it was designed by Alexander Jackson Davis.
Smallpox Hospital	Smallpox Hospital	March 23, 1976 (#0908)	E Road; 40°45′06″N 73°57′36″W	Roosevelt Island	Originally designed by architect James Renwick Jr., the 100-bed hospital opened in 1856, when the area was known as Blackwell's Island. Its ruins have been stabilized and preserved.
Statue of Liberty	Statue of Liberty	September 14, 1976 (#0931)	Liberty Island, New York Harbor; 40°41′21″N 74°02′40″W	Liberty Island	The iconic statue named Liberty Enlightening the World
Strecker Memorial Laboratory	Strecker Memorial Laboratory	March 23, 1976 (#0909)	E Road; 40°45′09″N 73°57′31″W	Roosevelt Island	Built in 1892 to serve as a laboratory for City Hospital, it was "the first institution in the nation for pathological and bacteriological research." The building was designed by architects Frederick Clarke Withers and Walter Dickson in the Romanesque Revival style.

== Interior landmarks ==
Landmark name	Image	Date listed	Location	Island	Description
Ellis Island, Main Building (Interior)	Ellis Island, Main Building (Interior)	November 16, 1993 (#1903)	Ellis Island; 40°41′57″N 74°02′22″W	Ellis Island	The interior of the second- and third-floor registry room of Ellis Island's main building, where immigrants were processed.

== See also ==
- List of National Historic Landmarks in New York City
- National Register of Historic Places listings in Manhattan on islands
