= Arsenal (Central Park) =

Building in Manhattan, New York

Coordinates: 40°46′04″N 73°58′17″W

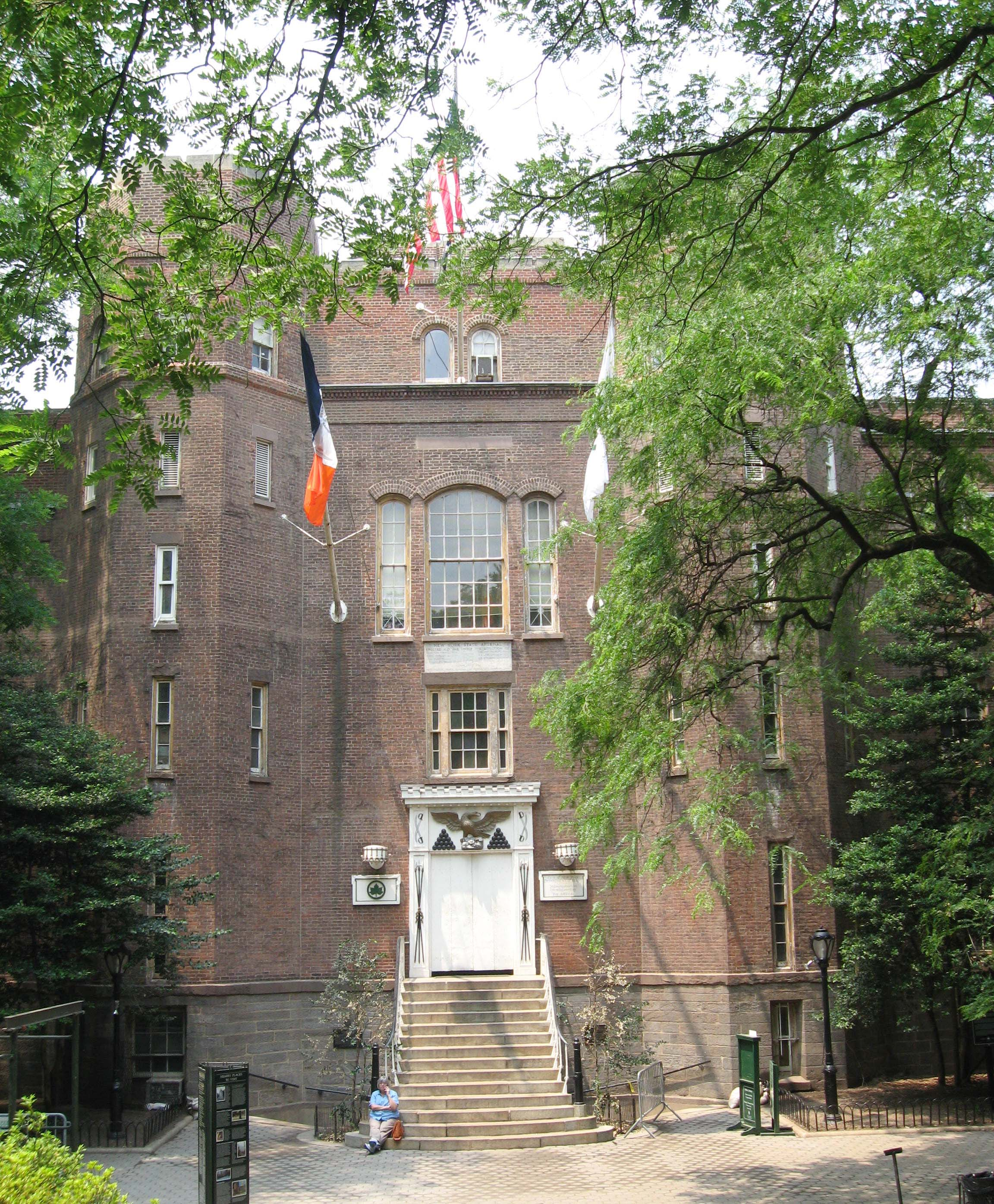
The central block in 2008

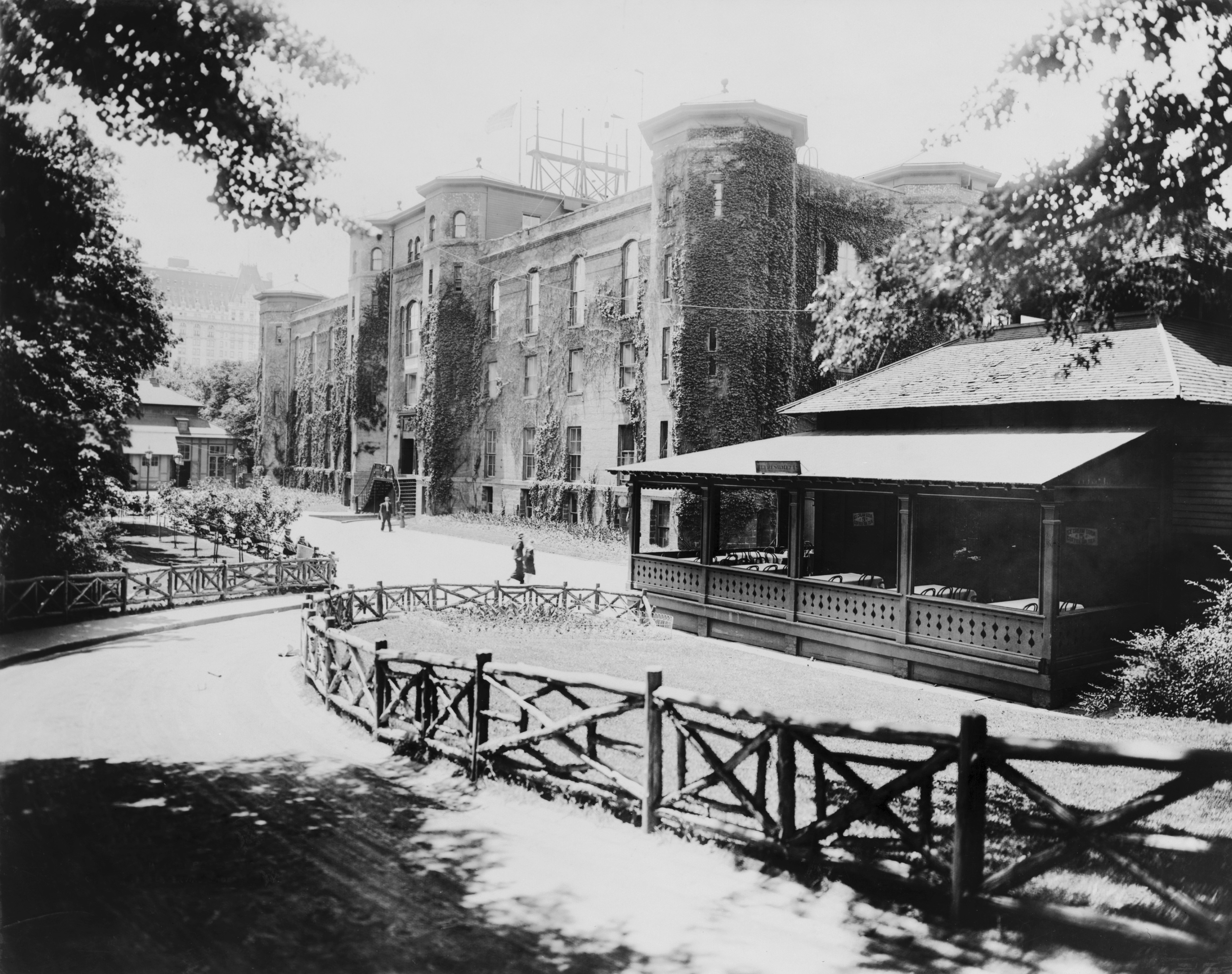
The Arsenal in 1911, at rear

Notable buildings and structures of Central Park. Click on the map and then on the points for details.
'"`UNIQ--templatestyles-00000001-QINU`"''"`UNIQ--templatestyles-00000002-QINU`"'

The Arsenal is a symmetrical brick building with modestly Gothic Revival details, located in Central Park in New York City adjacent to the Central Park Zoo. It is centered on 64th Street west of Fifth Avenue. Built between 1847 and 1851 as a storehouse for arms and ammunition for the New York State Militia, the building is the second-oldest extant structure that was constructed within Central Park, predating the park's construction. Only the 1814 Blockhouse No. 1 is older.

The Arsenal was designed by Martin E. Thompson, originally trained as a carpenter, who had been a partner of Ithiel Town and went on to become one of the founders of the National Academy of Design. Thompson's symmetrical structure of brick in English bond, with headers every fifth course, presents a central block in the manner of a fortified gatehouse flanked by half-octagonal towers. The carpentry doorframe speaks of its purpose with a bald eagle displayed between stacks of cannonballs over the door, and crossed sabers and stacked pikes represented in flanking panels. The lobby contains a series of floor-to-ceiling murals by Allen Saalburg from 1935-36, combining historical vignettes of New York life during the Civil War with ornamental scrolls and arabesques.

Following plans to tear it down due to dislike of its appearance, the building fell into more broad use by the 1920s and was renovated in the 1930s. The building currently houses the offices of the New York City Department of Parks and Recreation, City Parks Foundation, Historic House Trust, and the nearby Central Park Zoo as well as an art gallery known as the Arsenal Gallery, but it has also served as a zoo, a police precinct and a weather bureau and housed the American Museum of Natural History's collections while the museum's permanent structure was being erected.

The "Greensward Plan", the original plan for Central Park, is stored on the third floor.

== See also ==
- List of armories and arsenals in New York City and surrounding counties
- List of New York City Designated Landmarks in Manhattan from 59th to 110th Streets
