= Admiral's House (Governors Island) =

Historic house in Manhattan, New York

- U.S. National Register of Historic Places
- New York City Landmark
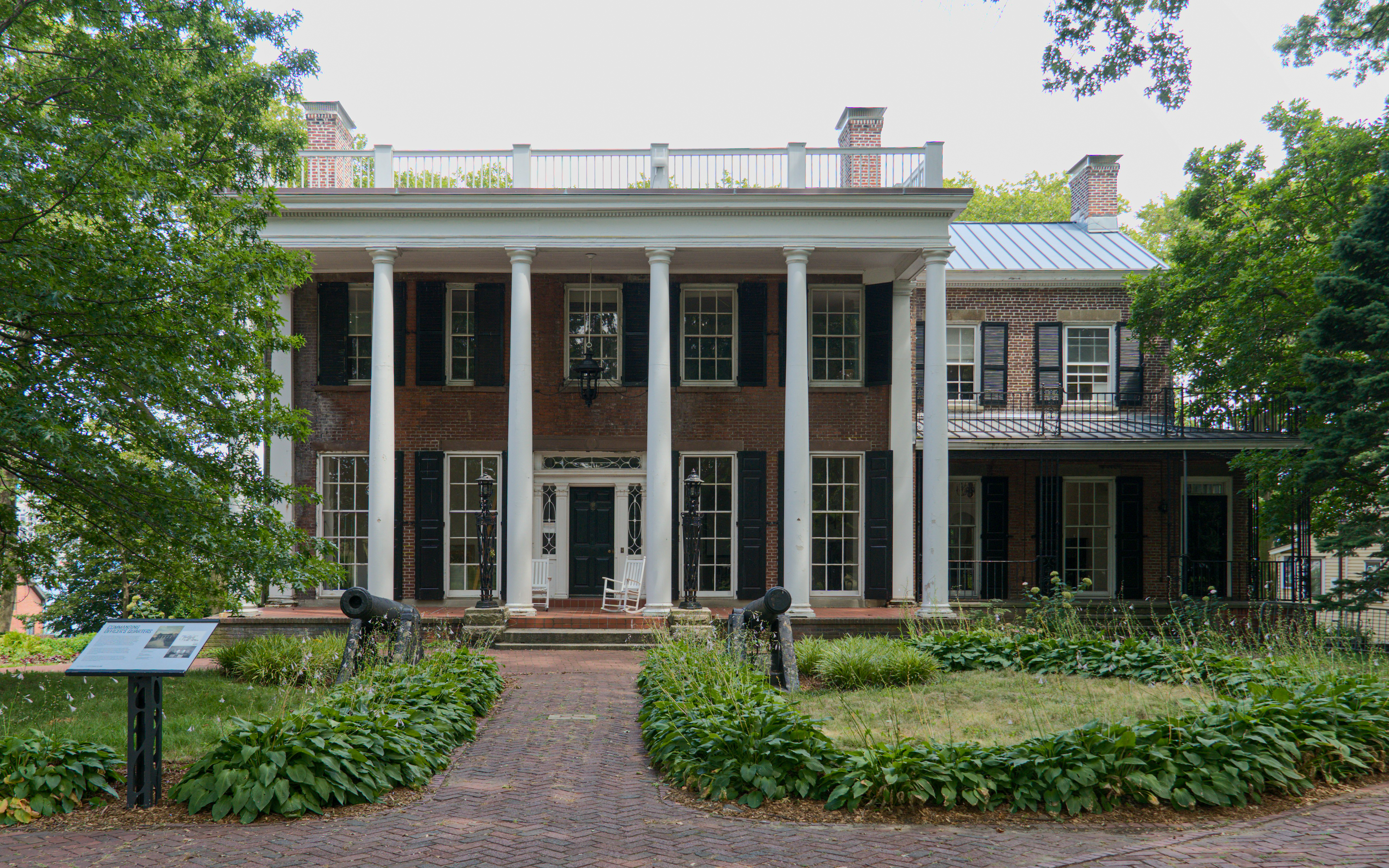
- Admiral's House in July 2020

- Location within New York City Location within New York Location within the United States
- Location: Governors Island, New York City
- Coordinates: 40°41′25″N 74°0′47″W
- Built: main: 1843 south wing: 1886 portico: c.1893-1916 rear: 1936-37
- Architect: Martin E. Thompson; Charles O. Cornelius (rear)
- Architectural style: Greek Revival; Colonial Revival (portico)
- NRHP reference No.: 72000860
- NYCL No.: 0546

Significant dates
- Added to NRHP: July 24, 1972
- Designated NYCL: September 19, 1967

The Admiral's House is a historic building located in the Nolan Park area of Governors Island in New York Harbor. It was originally designed by Martin E. Thompson in the Greek Revival style, and completed in 1843. The Admiral's House is both on the National Register of Historic Places and a New York City designated landmark.

== History ==
It was designed in 1840 by Martin E. Thompson in the Greek Revival style, and construction was completed in 1843. A south wing was added in 1886, and the roof was raised for the installation of a Colonial Revival entrance portico with Doric columns c. 1893–1918. The rear of the house was redesigned in 1936-37 by Charles O. Cornelius, who removed the house's original peak roof and added ironwork to the structure.

=== Uses ===
Governors Island hosted a U.S. Army post alternately known as Fort Columbus and Fort Jay and headquarters from the 1870s until 1965 when the structure was known as the Commanding Officer's Quarters or Quarters 1. Residents included Omar N. Bradley, Robert Lee Bullard, Adna Chaffee, John J. Pershing, Walter Bedell Smith, Leonard Wood, Jonathan Wainwright, and Winfield Scott Hancock, who ran for president while living here.

In 1966 the island became a U.S. Coast Guard base and headquarters for the Third Coast Guard District and the Atlantic Area Command, and the house was renamed Admiral's House. It was officially designated as Building 1. On December 7, 1988, the house was the location of a meeting between Mikhail Gorbachev, then General Secretary of the Soviet Union and U.S. President Ronald Reagan, immediately after Gorbachev's speech to the United Nations announcing "perestroika". The summit meeting helped the two countries to take steps which led to the end of the Cold War. The Coast Guard base closed in 1996, in some part due to the peace dividend which resulted from the lessening of tensions.

The Admiral's House was designated a New York City landmark in 1967 and was added to the National Register of Historic Places in 1972.

== Description ==
The Admiral's House is two stories tall, with a high basement to its east, where the land slopes downward. The original (1843) wing was described as having "the character of a country villa with some unusual exterior woodwork" as well as a cornice with scalloped molding as well as latticed porch columns. The porches on both the east and west sides have two-story-high Doric wooden columns. The porch on the west side contains granite steps, while the porch on the east side has a veranda that branches out to semicircular brick steps. There are wrought-iron lamps beside both staircases as well as a wrought-iron railing at the back staircase. The southern and western elevations of the south wing also have a porch with wrought-iron railings.

A brick walkway flanked by a pair of cannons leads from Nolan Park to the front entrance, on the western side. A Colonial Revival doorway is located at the front entrance, while full-height windows with shutters are located to either side of the front door. The rear porch on the eastern side has double doors below transoms. The other windows in the Admiral's House are either six-over-six or nine-over-nine, with shutters.

== See also ==
- List of New York City Designated Landmarks in Manhattan on smaller islands
- National Register of Historic Places listings in Manhattan on islands
