= Brooklyn Naval Hospital =

Hospital in New York City (1838–1948)

- Navy
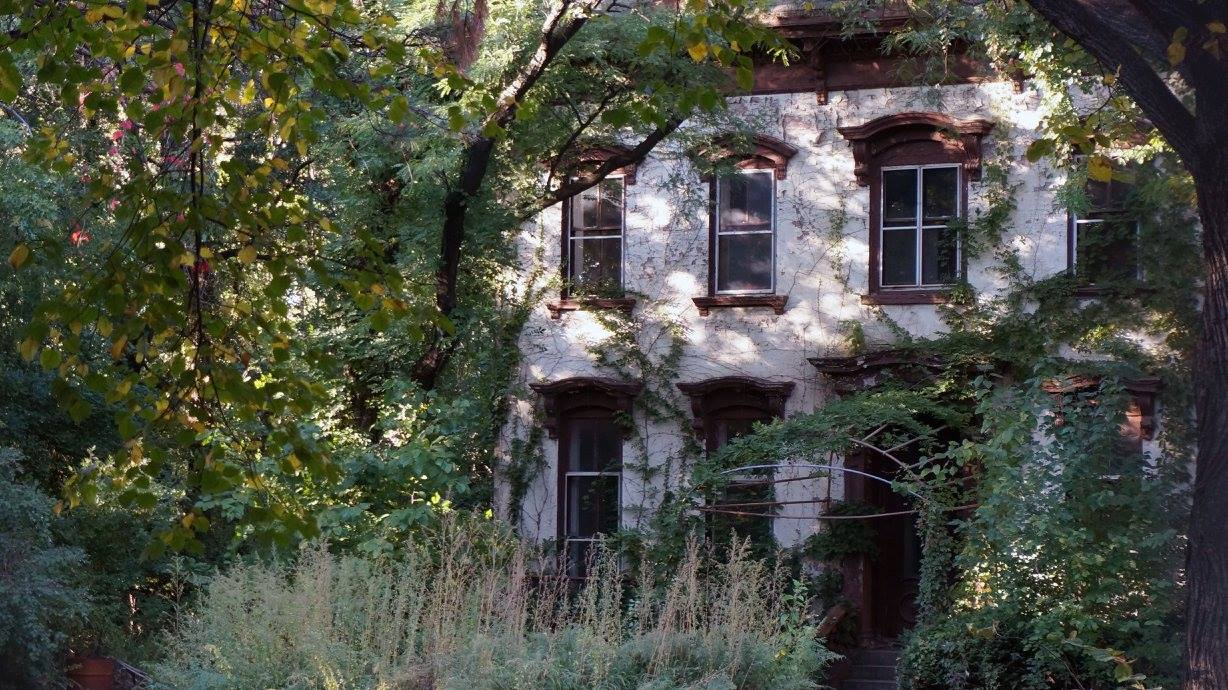
- Exterior of the Surgeon's Residence at Brooklyn Naval Hospital, seen from the front in 2015

Geography
- Location: near 63 Flushing Avenue, Brooklyn, New York, United States
- Coordinates: 40°41′55″N 73°57′54″W

Organization
- Type: Military

History
- Founded: 1838
- Closed: 1948

Links
- Lists: Hospitals in New York State
- Other links: Hospitals in Brooklyn

Brooklyn Naval Hospital is a closed hospital in Brooklyn, New York City, within the Brooklyn Navy Yard. It was one of the oldest naval hospitals in the United States, having operated from 1838 to 1948. Two of the structures in the former hospital's site are designated New York City Landmarks. The entire hospital complex is listed on the National Register of Historic Places along with the rest of the Navy Yard.

== History ==
=== Establishment and operation ===
The first hospital at the Brooklyn Navy Yard was established within the main shipyard. However, its facilities were described as inadequate; an 1811 letter described the hospital as being in a pond that flooded during high tide, and without any sterile lining to prevent disease transmission. In 1824, the Secretary of the Navy purchased a dedicated 25-or-33-acre (10-or-13 ha) tract for a new Brooklyn Naval Hospital. This plot was not connected to the rest of the Navy Yard at the time. The hospital was established the following year. At the time the hospital was constructed, the area was still largely rural, and its buildings secluded from the developed sections of Brooklyn. The hospital's main building was not actually completed until 1838, with additional wings added two years later.

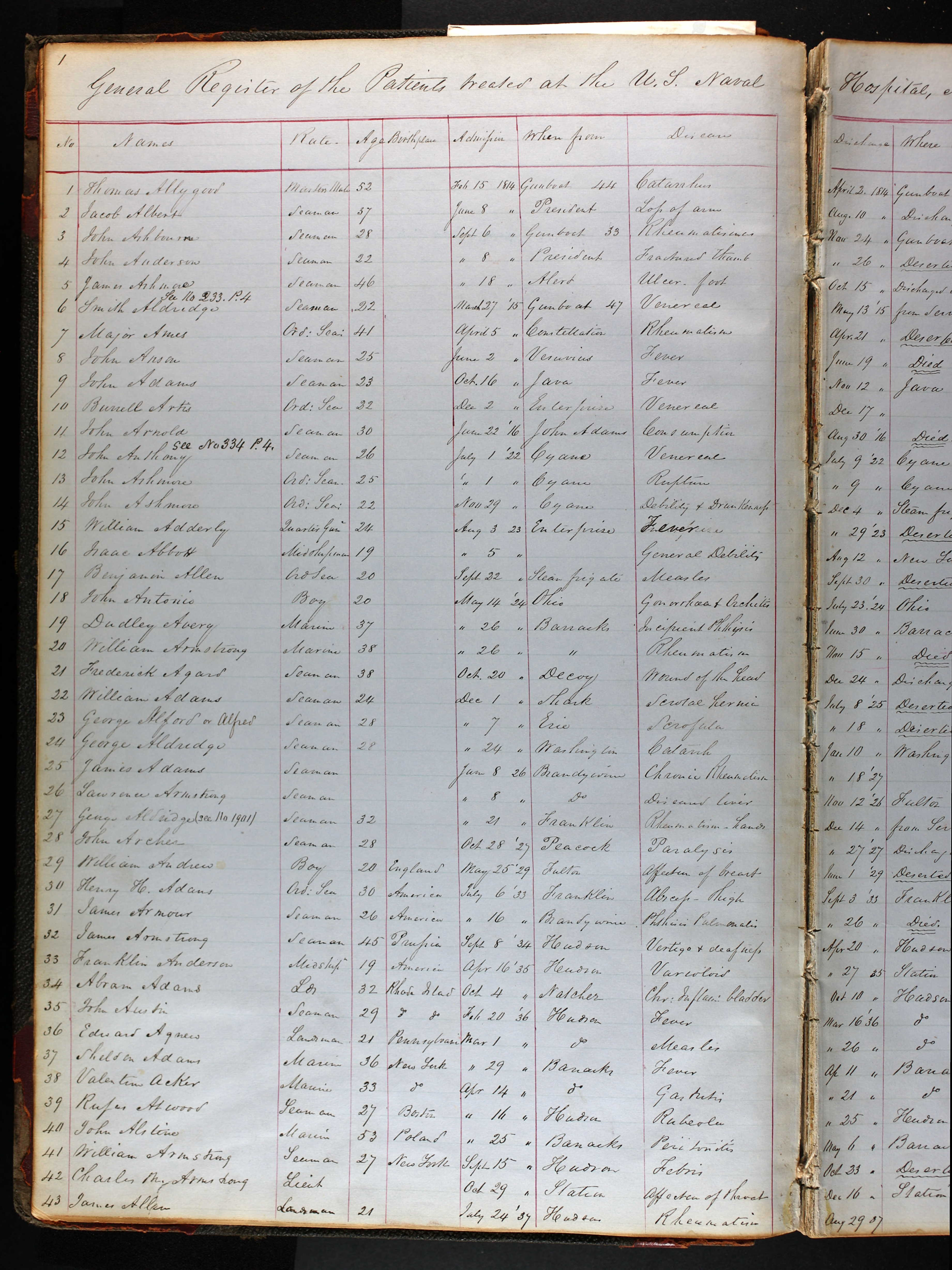
General Register of the Patients treated at the U S Naval Hospital New York,p.1814 to 1837, p.1

A pharmaceutical laboratory was added to the main property in 1853; the building no longer exists. E. R. Squibb, the inventor of the anesthetic ether, was the first person to run the laboratory. He worked on improving a distillation method for ether during his tenure at the hospital until he left in 1857. Shortly afterward, when the American Civil War broke out, Squibb provided drugs to the Naval Hospital from his laboratory on nearby Furman Street.

The Brooklyn Naval Hospital was active from the American Civil War through World War II. At first, the hospital treated sailors and dock workers, and had a capacity of 125 beds which could hold 150 patients. The Brooklyn Naval Hospital became the main hospital in the United States Navy's hospital system in the 1850s. The two-story Surgeon's House was completed in 1863. It was estimated that during the course of the Civil War, the hospital treated almost a quarter of all Union casualties, and annexes were built so the hospital could treat up to 450 patients at once. After the war, the hospital also started treating civilians. By the end of the 19th century, the mud flats separating the hospital and the rest of the Brooklyn Navy Yard were filled in and developed. Work on a new wing to the original building began in 1895, and was completed in 1900.

By 1904, the Brooklyn Naval Hospital was ranked one of the best civilian hospitals in the U.S. Two quarters numbered 2 and 3 were built for medical staff in 1905. A medical supply depot was completed circa 1910, and a lumber shed was completed in 1910. The medical supply depot later became an officer's quarters, while the lumber shed was later converted into a morgue. By 1913, the quarters for the officer in command of the medical supply depot was being converted into a facility for patients with contagious diseases. In 1915, three small brick quarters buildings numbered 5 through 7 were built at the hospital's northwestern edge, away from the existing buildings. This was done in an effort to quarantine anyone with contagious diseases.

Circa 1917, the United States' entry into World War I necessitated further expansion of the hospital. The original hospital building's capacity was doubled to 600 with the construction of a new wing, and the supply depot was moved to Sands Street so the former supply depot building could be converted into additional facilities for patients. A nurses' quarters, with capacity for 130 nurses, was built in 1919 at the northern boundary of the hospital grounds. An additional wing for the original building opened in 1920. These improvements, along with four additional buildings that no longer exist, allowed the hospital to accommodate 3,000 patients at a time during World War I. After World War I ended, the number of patients declined until 1938 (just before World War II), when a national emergency was declared.

In preparation for World War II, the Works Progress Administration refurbished the Naval Hospital's 37 buildings, although no new structures were built. The hospital accommodated 65,197 patients over the course of the war. The Navy's first Cardiac Consultation Service was founded at the hospital in 1941. The Brooklyn branch of the Red Cross Service, also helped the hospital's patients with rehabilitation activities.

=== Closure ===
In April 1948, after the war ended, the Navy announced that it would be closing the Brooklyn Naval Hospital. Despite objections from U.S. Representative James J. Heffernan, the hospital was officially decommissioned on June 30, 1948. Most of the hospital's patients were relocated to the St. Albans Naval Hospital, a newly constructed facility in St. Albans, Queens. Subsequently, the hospital was converted into the United States Naval Receiving Annex, Brooklyn. Some of the buildings were to be repurposed into additional housing. After the greater Navy Yard was decommissioned in the 1960s, the Navy retained the former hospital buildings as administrative structures until 1989.

The structures are largely in the same state as they had been since abandonment. However, several buildings had been demolished during the late 20th century. Skeletons in the former hospital's cemetery were rediscovered in 1997 during a survey. Two years later, a report on the cemetery was published.

In 2012, Steiner Studios proposed to build a media campus at the former hospital site. The Naval Hospital campus would be an annex to the existing Steiner Studios lot, located just west of Brooklyn Naval Hospital. Steiner Studios planned to restore the hospital buildings starting in 2017, and restoration was expected to take nearly a decade. The extant buildings included the main building, surgeon's house, quarters 4 through 7, bachelors' and nurses' quarters, carriage houses and stables, the medical supply depot, and the morgue/lumber shed. Steiner proposed to convert these structures into production, post-production, and production support space. The hospital, along with the rest of the Navy Yard, was listed on the National Register of Historic Places (NRHP) in 2014. The Steiner Studios plan calls for the restoration of 15 NRHP-listed buildings at the Brooklyn Naval Hospital campus, but would also demolish some of the NRHP-contributing artifacts to make way for the new facility. Structures with a total floor area of 2,700 square feet (250 m^{2}) would be demolished and replaced with landscaped lawn space.

== Notable structures ==
=== Main building ===
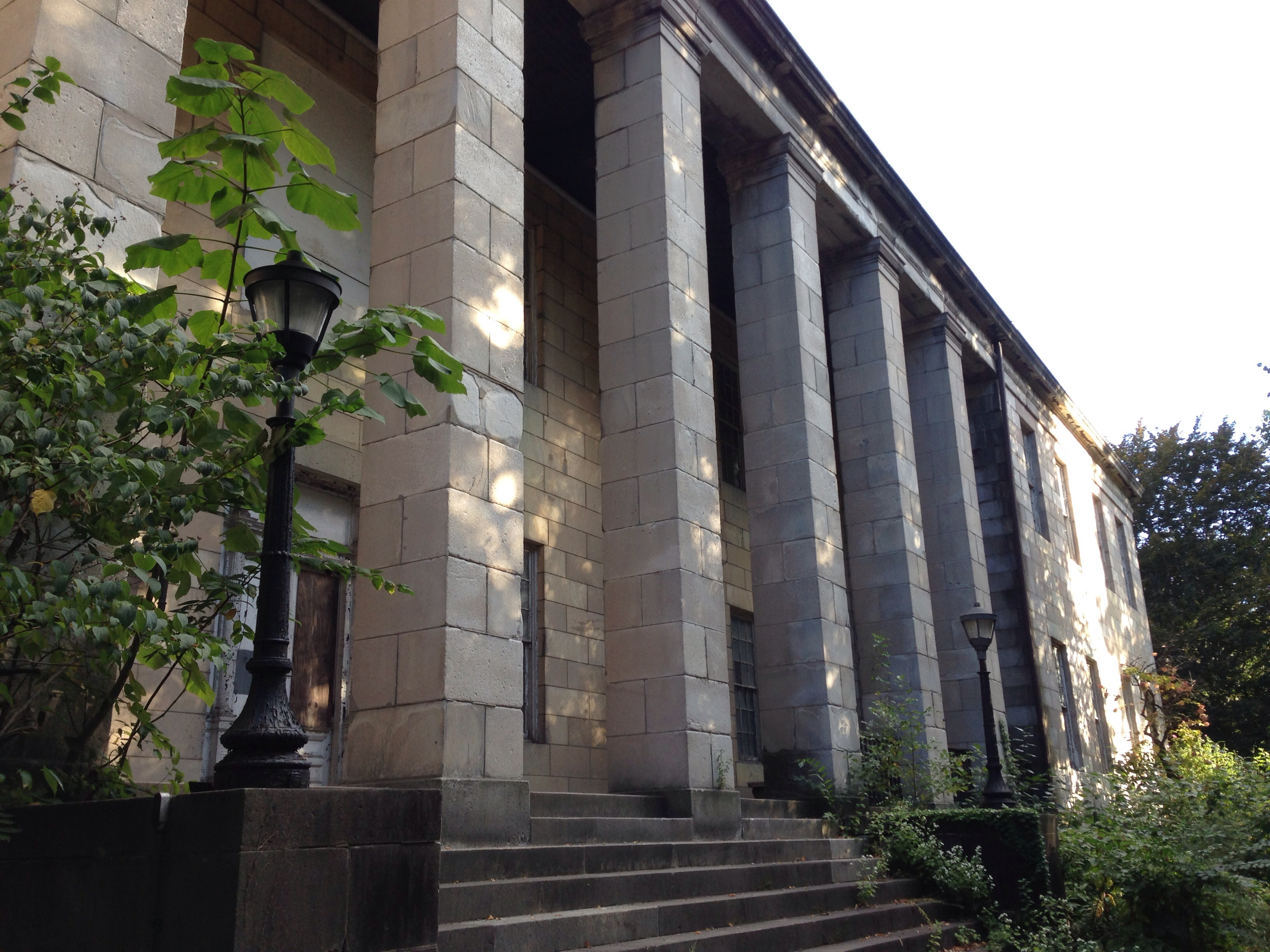
Side view of the main hospital building

The Brooklyn Naval Hospital's main building is Building R95, a 60,000-square-foot (5,600 m^{2}), 2-story Greek Revival structure with a granite facade. The building was designed by Martin E. Thompson. The front portion of the building was built starting in 1830 and was completed in 1838. Two wings were completed in 1840, and were attached to the front section in a rough "E" shape. The long side of the "E" contains a symmetrical portico recessed into the walls and surrounded by eight 2-story-tall stone Doric piers. The front portico, facing west onto Hospital Road, contains ten bays while the sides each contain nine bays, and there are twelve-over-twelve-pane double-sash windows with wooden frames on all elevations of the building. Additional entrances are located on the sides of the building, and a second portico.

During the Civil War, a temporary wooden annex with capacity for another 300 patients was added, though this annex might have once treated 500 patients simultaneously. The wooden annex was torn down at the end of the war. Two additional wings were added in 1900 and 1920 but were also demolished; the original building and the two 1840 wings remain. The structure was made a New York City designated landmark in 1965. The building was cited as a "rare surviving example of early institutional design" in the city's landmark report.

=== Surgeon's House ===
A two-story Surgeon's House (Building R1), designed in the French Second Empire style, was built in 1863 by builder True W. Rollins and civil engineer Charles Hastings. The entrance to the house is symmetrical and contains a small pair of steps to a large doorway, with segmental arches and balustrades on either side of the entryway. The facade of the house contains a variety of window designs, including a large bay window on the north side of the first floor, and segmental arch windows on the second floor and at the front side of the first floor. There are sixteen rooms in the house itself, as well as a servant's quarters. The house also contains a Mansard roof with a full-height attic, as well as dormer windows from the attic that stick out from the slope of the roof. A curved driveway leads from the main entrance. The Surgeon's House is also a New York City designated landmark, having been marked as such in 1976.

=== Cemetery ===
The hospital's official cemetery, the U.S. Naval Hospital Cemetery, was established in 1831. The hospital's cemetery stopped burying soldiers in 1910, when it had reached its burial capacity. In 1926, Congress provided funding for the decommissioning of the U.S. Naval Hospital Cemetery. Subsequently, 987 soldiers' graves were exhumed and re-interred at Cypress Hills Cemetery. A park on the hospital cemetery's site, the Naval Cemetery Landscape, was opened in May 2016.

=== Other structures ===
A two-story brick carriage house, Building R103, was built around 1900. It contained two garage slots on the first floor, and a second story with rectangular windows and stone windowsills with flush lintels. The carriage building contained single-paneled wooden doors at the side and rear of the building, as well as a second-story entrance on the east side that was accessed by a no-longer-extant stair. A gable-roofed brick annex, Building R109, is attached to the carriage house. It is located on a slope, with two stories on the lower eastern side and one story on the higher western side of the building. There are segmental arched windows on the longer elevations of the building, as well as a garage with sliding wooden doors on the southern side.

Quarters 4, also known as Building R4, was built in 1864 and served several purposes. It was a surgeon's residence until 1903, a directors' residence from 1903 to 1919, a nurses' quarters in 1919, and a sick officers' quarters after 1920. Quarters 4 was built in the Italianate style, with two wings. The asymmetrical three-story gable-roofed main building contains a single-pane wooden door at its front entrance, and six-over-six and two-over-four-sash windows with round arches at the top of each window. The third story was not included in the building's original construction, as it was built in 1917. A two-story wing is attached to the north facade and contains an entrance with segmental arches, as well as rectangular windows. A balcony runs along all three stories on the west side the building and was constructed around 1947; it contains one-over-one windows with metal frames.

The medical supply depot (Building RD) was based on a design by architect Ernest Flagg. The design was similar to that of the naval hospital at the United States Naval Academy (which Flagg also designed), with a slightly utilitarian buff-colored brick facade, a hip roof, and classical-style elements.

The lumber shed (Building R426) also had a hip roof, but was one story high and located near the original hospital building's eastern wall. The lumber shed was later converted into a morgue.

Other structures on the Brooklyn Naval Hospital campus include:

- Buildings R5-R7: Infectious Disease Quarters, built in 1915
- Buildings R8 and R9: Bachelor Officers' Quarters, built in 1926
- Building 103a: Garage, built circa 1947
- Building R104: Guard House and Gate Keeper Lodge, built circa 1850
- Building 311: Motion Picture Exchange, built 1942
- Site R448: Greenhouse, built 1928
- Building RG: Nurses' Quarters, built 1919 with an expansion circa 1980

== See also ==
- List of hospitals in Brooklyn

== Sources ==
- AECOM (June 2015). "Final Environmental Impact Statement: Steiner Studios Media Campus" (PDF).
- Brooklyn Navy Yard Historic District (PDF). United States Department of the Interior; National Park Service. April 7, 2014. Archived from the original (PDF) on January 31, 2017.
- Diamonstein-Spielvogel, Barbaralee (2011). The Landmarks of New York (5th ed.). Albany, New York: State University of New York Press. ISBN 978-1-4384-3769-9.
- Old U.S. Naval Hospital (PDF). New York City Landmarks Preservation Commission. October 14, 1965. Archived from the original (PDF) on August 4, 2016.
- Surgeon's House (PDF). New York City Landmarks Preservation Commission. November 9, 1976. Archived from the original (PDF) on March 3, 2016.
