= Allen Saalburg =

American painter

Allen Russell Saalburg (1899–1987) was an American painter, illustrator, and screen printer born in Rochelle, Illinois. His brother, Leslie, was a fashion illustrator; his father was the cartoonist and color-printing inventor Charles W. Saalburg. Allen studied at the Art Students League of New York before working in advertising and magazine illustration in the 1920s. In 1929 he traveled to Paris with his wife, the fashion and costume designer Muriel King, and with her sketched runway fashions for department stores. While there he had his first gallery show, at the esteemed Bernheim-Jeune gallery, and his second back in New York at a gallery run by Louis Bouché.

During the 1930s Saalburg had regular shows of decorative wall panels and screenprints on glass (a specialty). Juliana Force, the founding director of the Whitney Museum, saw to it that Saalburg was appointed director of murals for the New York City Parks Department (part of the Works Progress Administration), overseeing murals in the Central Park Zoo and other New York locations. His murals in the Arsenal of Central Park survive. In 1935 he designed sets for the film The Green Pastures. In 1942, the United States Flag Association awarded him the Cross of Honor and Patriotic Service Cross for his painting Flag Over Mt. Vernon. In the 1950s he showed his gouache paintings at the Kraushaar Gallery, and also sold illustrations to Fortune, Vanity Fair, and other magazines.

By 1947 Saalburg was divorced and had suffered the death of his only child. The ascendancy of abstract expressionism and "the implied obsolescence of his own interests and preferences" contributed to his leaving New York for Bucks County, Pennsylvania, where he established the Canal Press to print his own, largely open-edition silkscreens, drawn to their democratic potential for "enabling original works in color to be placed within the reach of every person." His prints were long sold by the New York Graphic Society, founded to market affordable art during the Depression.

A long-time resident of Uhlerstown, Pennsylvania, Saalburg died in Flemington, New Jersey, at the age of 88, survived by his second wife, the artist Mary Faulconer. His work can be found in the Whitney Museum of American Art, the Philadelphia Museum of Art, the Metropolitan Museum of Art, and the print collection of the New York Public Library.

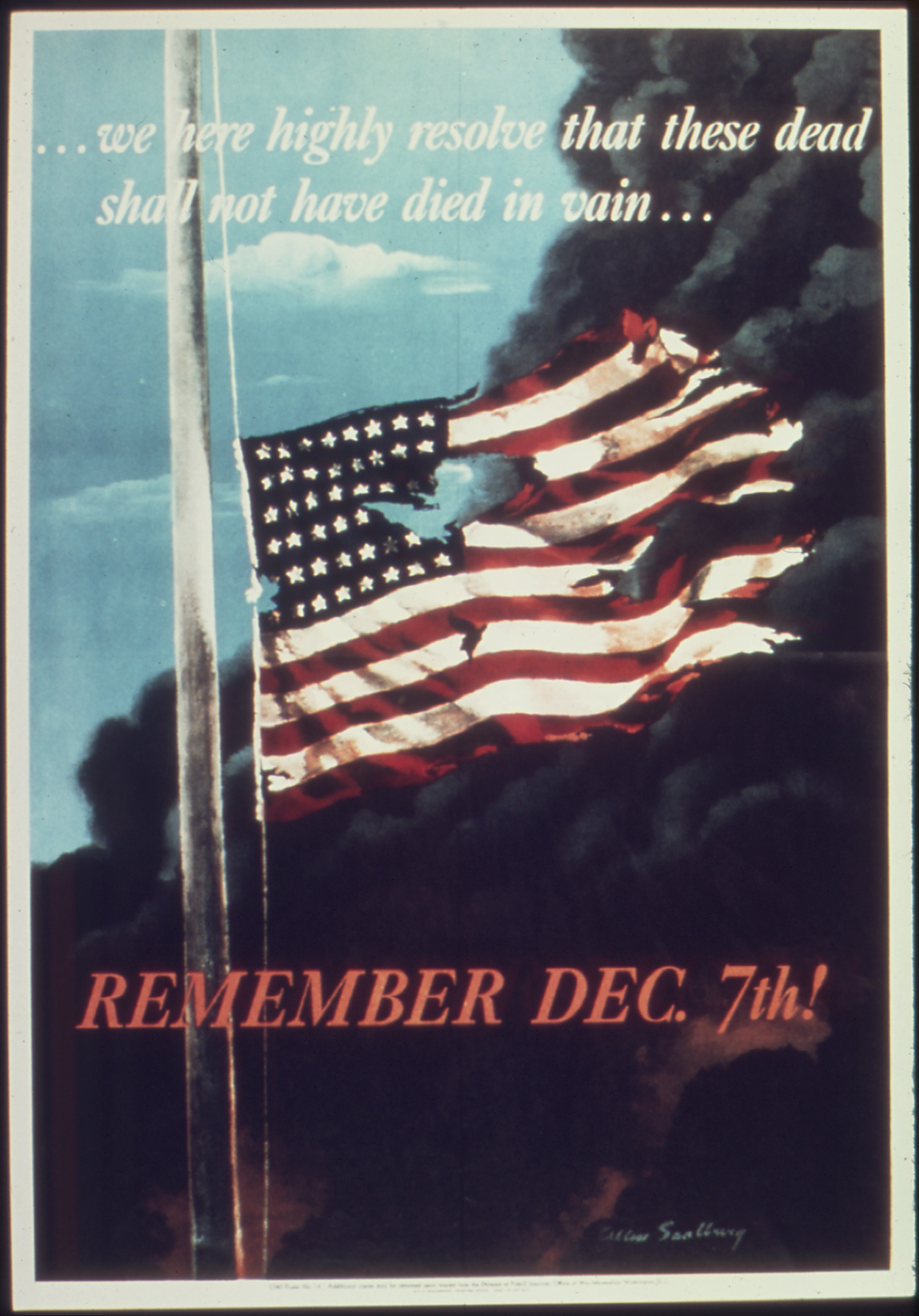
"Remember December 7th!", one of the first posters published after the attack on Pearl Harbor

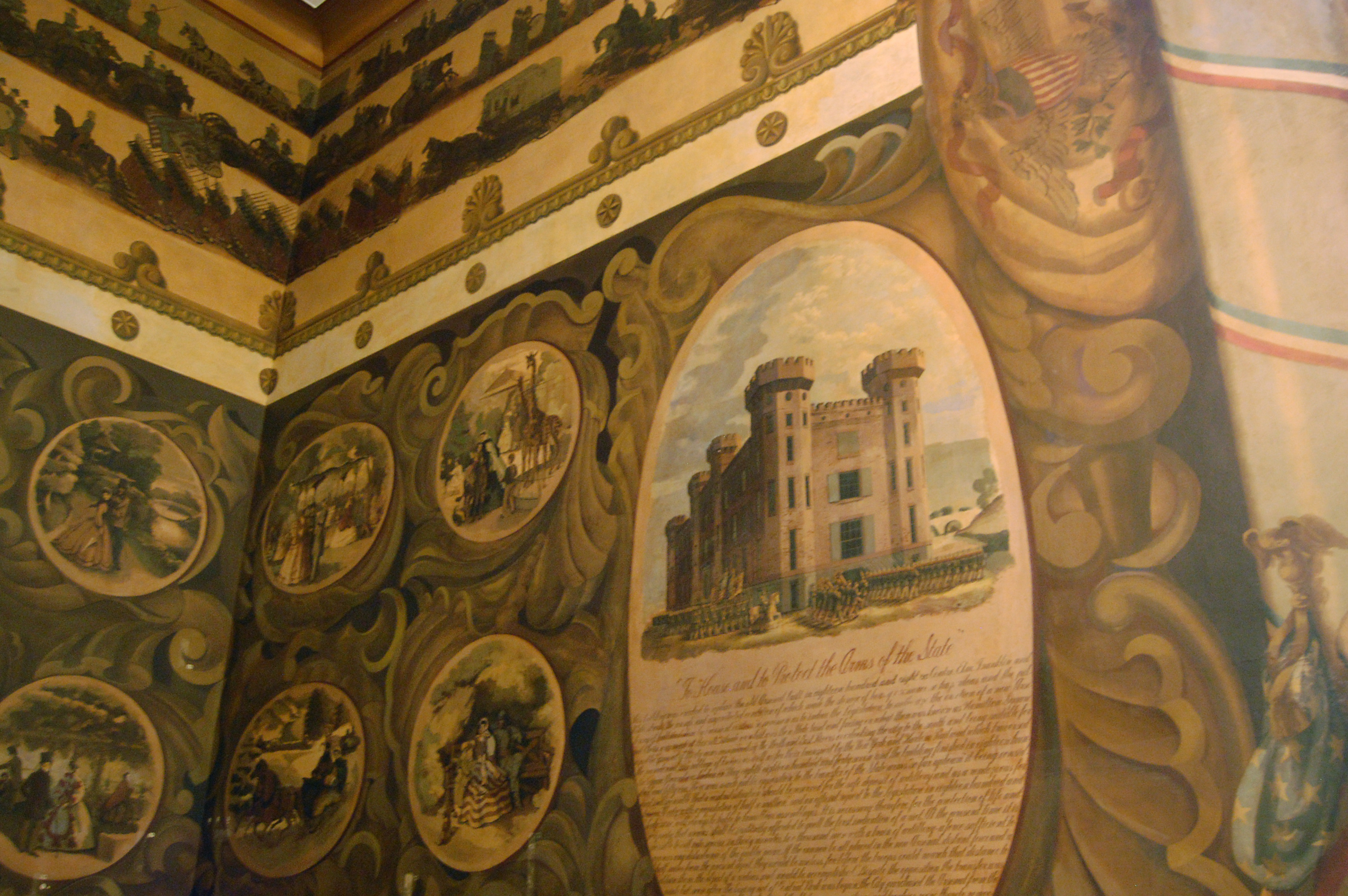
Detail of a mural at the Arsenal Building, New York City
