= Governor's House (Governors Island) =

Historic house in Manhattan, New York

- U.S. National Register of Historic Places
- New York City Landmark
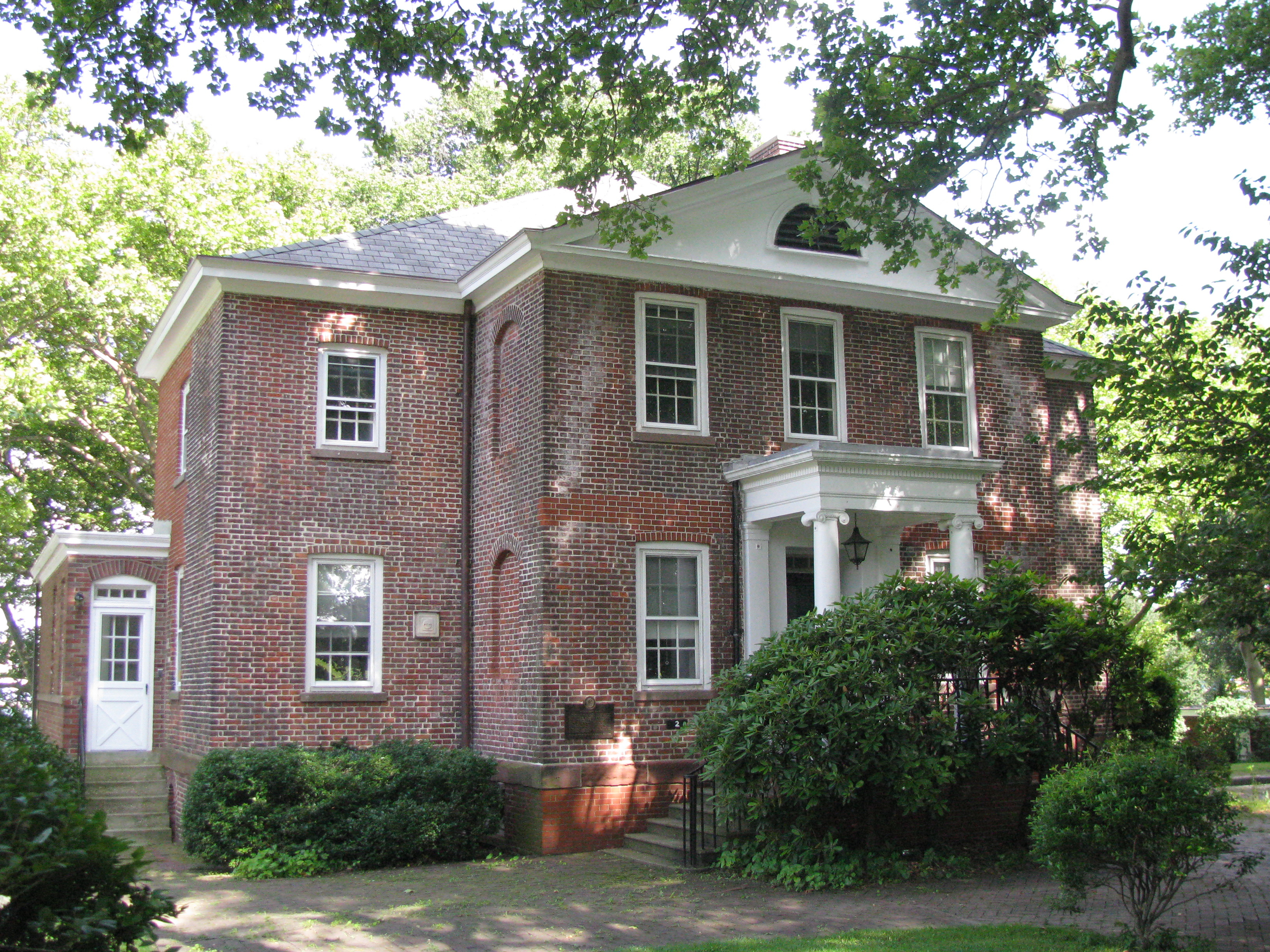

- Location within New York City Location within New York Location within the United States
- Location: Governors Island, New York, New York
- Coordinates: 40°41′27″N 74°0′48″W
- Area: less than one acre
- Built: 1805–1813
- Architectural style: Georgian
- NRHP reference No.: 73001217
- NYCL No.: 0545

Significant dates
- Added to NRHP: April 26, 1973
- Designated NYCL: September 19, 1967

The Governor's House, also known as Building 2, is a historic house on Governors Island in New York City. It was added to the National Register of Historic Places in 1973.

The Governor's House was built c. 1805–1813, during the War of 1812 and was originally known as the Guard House. It is the oldest structure on the island that is not a fortification, but contrary to popular misconception, is not the Colonial Governor's Mansion, which was built in 1702. Building 2 was commanding officers' quarters between 1822 and 1843, then was used the main guard house and post commanding officers' quarters until the 1920s. The building was then used as officers' quarters by 1922. A brick annex was built to the south in 1939.

The Governor's House is a two-story Georgian brick structure. The footprint is similar to a Greek Cross, and the gable roof projections, covered with asphalt, intersect at the center of the "cross". The entrance portico contains Ionic columns under an entablature, with a paneled wooden door behind a transom, and is accessed by a concrete-upon-brick stoop. At the entrance portico above the second story is a small lunette window. The windows around the house are six-over-six, double-hung, with brownstone windowsills. The east-side annex has a Colonial Revival doorway and cast stone sills.

== See also ==
- List of New York City Designated Landmarks in Manhattan on smaller islands
- National Register of Historic Places listings in Manhattan on islands
