= Blackwell House =

Historic house in Manhattan, New York

- U.S. National Register of Historic Places
- New York State Register of Historic Places
- New York City Landmark
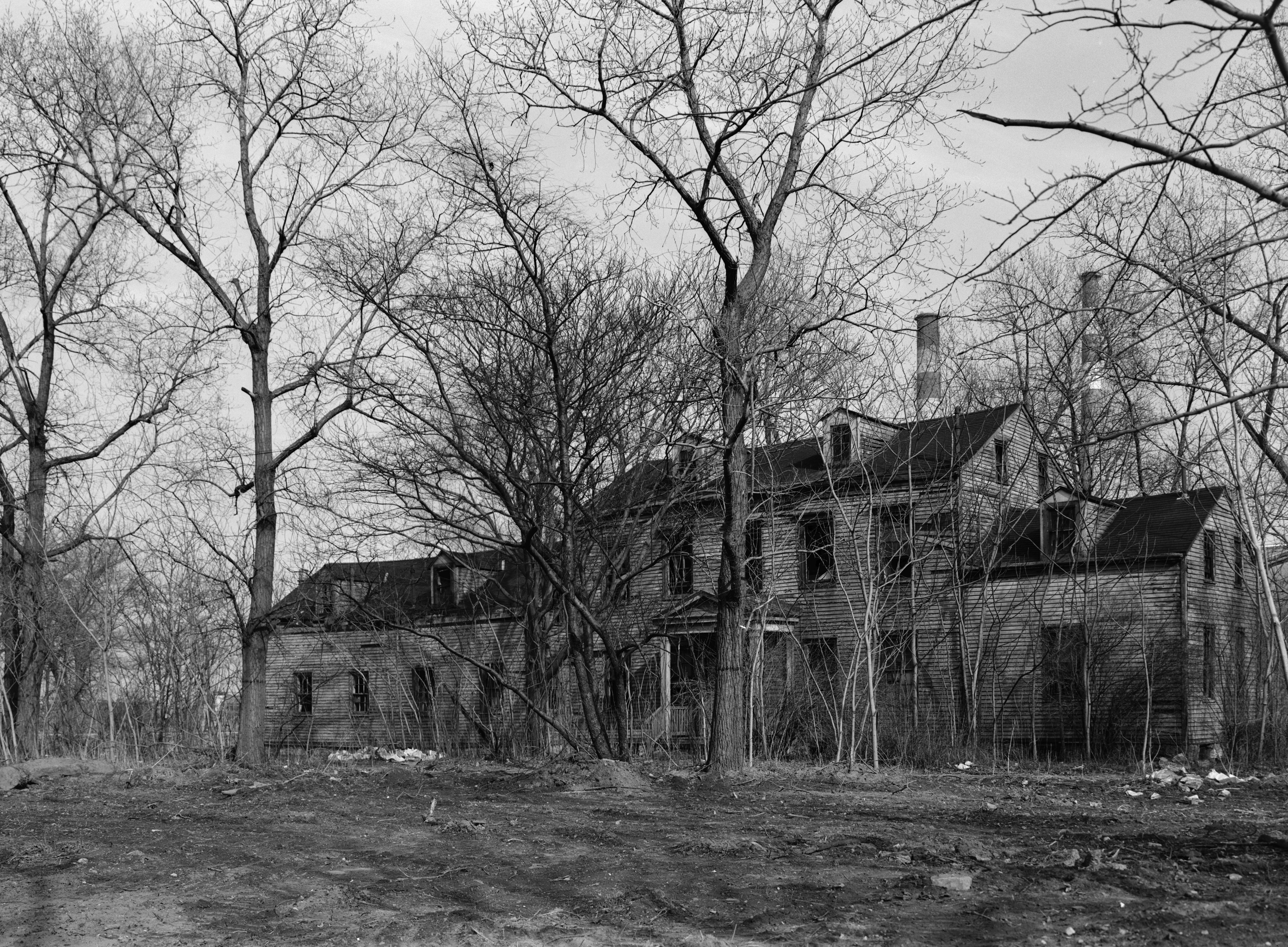

- Location within New York City Location within New York Location within the United States
- Location: Roosevelt Island, New York, New York
- Coordinates: 40°45′37″N 73°57′4″W
- Built: 1796
- NRHP reference No.: 72000862
- NYSRHP No.: 06101.000498
- NYCL No.: 0912

Significant dates
- Added to NRHP: February 25, 1972
- Designated NYSRHP: June 23, 1980
- Designated NYCL: March 23, 1976

Blackwell House is a historic house on Roosevelt Island in New York City. The house's name comes from Jacob Blackwell, who built the house in 1796. He was the great-grandson of Robert Blackwell, who in 1686 took ownership of what was then known as Manning's Island and subsequently became the island's new namesake. The house was added to the National Register of Historic Places in 1972.

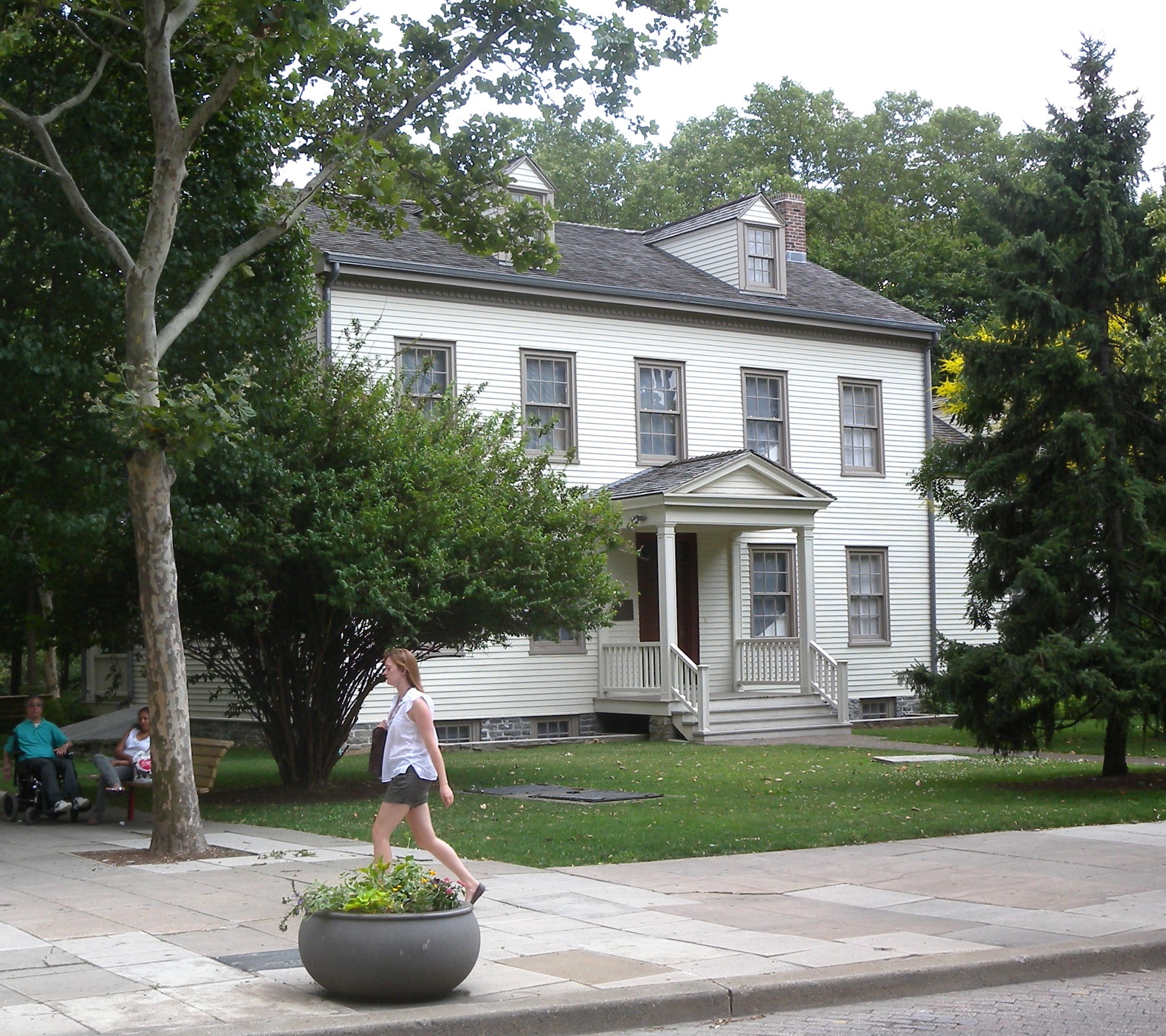
The front entrance to Blackwell House, in 2010.

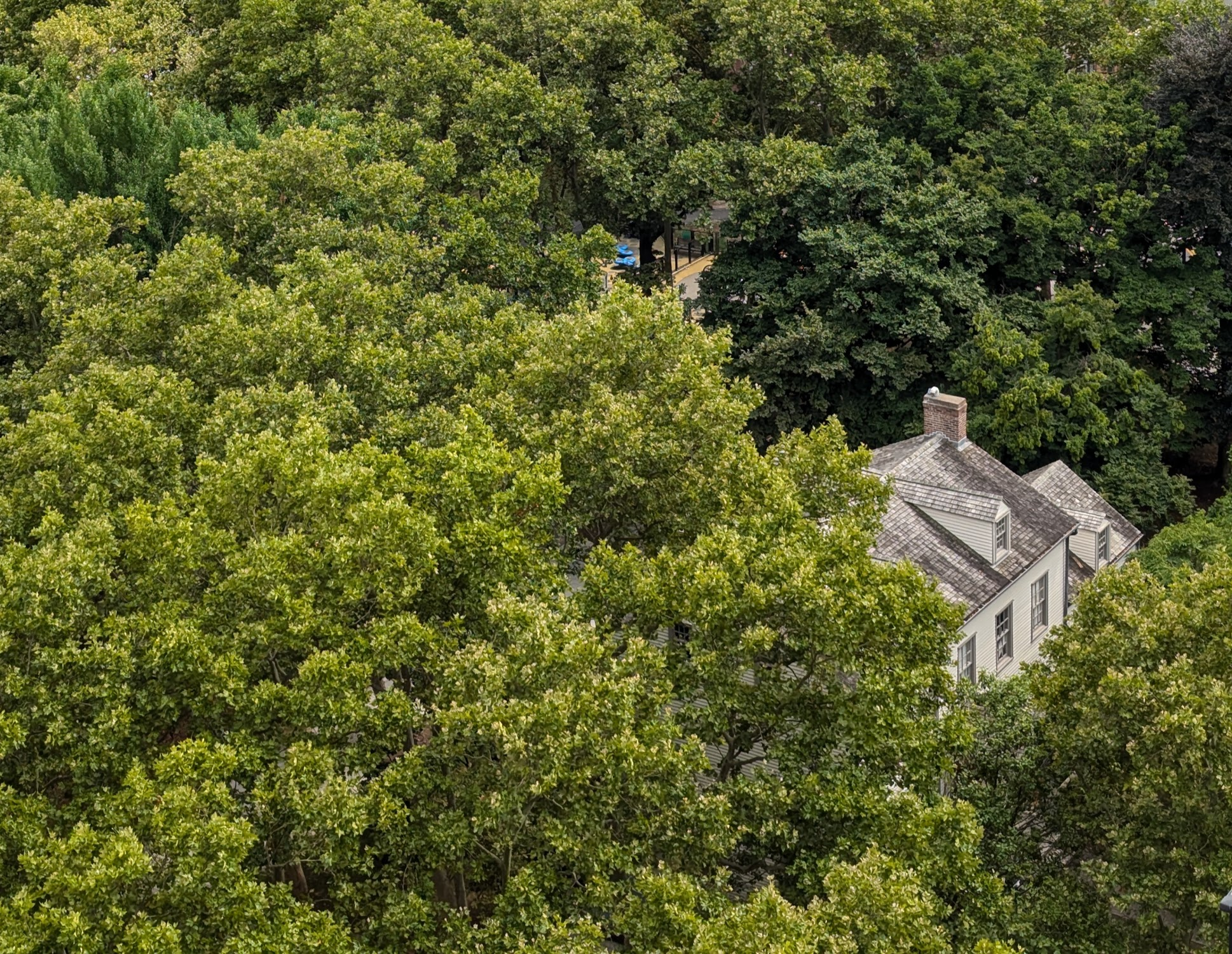
An aerial view of Blackwell House, in 2024.

== See also ==
- List of New York City Designated Landmarks in Manhattan on Islands
- National Register of Historic Places listings in Manhattan on islands
