= National Register of Historic Places listings in Manhattan on islands =

This is intended to be a complete list of historic properties and districts listed on the National Register of Historic Places located on islands other than Manhattan Island but still in New York County, New York. For all properties and districts in the borough of Manhattan, see National Register of Historic Places listings in Manhattan. The locations of National Register properties and districts (at least for all showing latitude and longitude coordinates below) may be seen in an online map by clicking on "Map of all coordinates".

This National Park Service list is complete through NPS recent listings posted September 26, 2025.

Contents: Counties in New York
Albany (Albany) – Allegany – Bronx – Broome – Cattaraugus – Cayuga – Chautauqua – Chemung – Chenango – Clinton – Columbia – Cortland – Delaware – Dutchess (Poughkeepsie, Rhinebeck) – Erie (Buffalo) – Essex – Franklin – Fulton – Genesee – Greene – Hamilton – Herkimer – Jefferson – Kings – Lewis – Livingston – Madison – Monroe (Rochester) – Montgomery – Nassau – New York (Below 14th Street, 14th to 59th Streets, 59th to 110th Streets, Above 110th Street, Islands) – Niagara (Niagara Falls) – Oneida – Onondaga (Syracuse) – Ontario – Orange – Orleans – Oswego – Otsego – Putnam – Queens – Rensselaer – Richmond – Rockland – St. Lawrence – Saratoga – Schenectady – Schoharie – Schuyler – Seneca – Steuben – Suffolk – Sullivan – Tioga – Tompkins – Ulster – Warren – Washington – Wayne – Westchester (Northern, Southern, New Rochelle, Peekskill, Yonkers) – Wyoming – Yates

== Listings on islands considered part of New York County ==
	Name on the Register	Image	Date listed	Location	City or town	Description
1	Admiral's House	Admiral's House	July 24, 1972 (#72000860)	Nolan Park; 40°41′25″N 74°00′50″W	Governors Island	Used by the commanding officers of the Army and Coast Guard units.
2	Blackwell House	Blackwell House	February 25, 1972 (#72000862)	501 Main Street, Roosevelt Island (formerly Welfare Island); 40°45′38″N 73°57′05″W	Roosevelt Island	Built in 1796 by a descendant of the first English owner of the island
3	Block House	Block House	July 24, 1972 (#72000863)	Nolan Park on Barry Road; 40°41′20″N 74°00′51″W	Governors Island	A small military prison on Governors Island.
4	Castle Williams	Castle Williams	July 31, 1972 (#72000864)	Hay Road and Andes Road; 40°41′34″N 74°01′11″W	Governors Island	A circular 19th century fortification of red sandstone on the northwest point of Governors Island, part of a system of forts to protect New York City from naval attack. Now part of Governors Island National Monument.
5	Chapel of the Good Shepherd	Chapel of the Good Shepherd	March 16, 1972 (#72000865)	543 Main Street; 40°45′42″N 73°57′02″W	Roosevelt Island	A historic Episcopal church designed by architect Frederick Clarke Withers, now known as the Good Shepherd Community Ecumenical Center
6	City Hospital	City Hospital	March 16, 1972 (#72000868)	Between Road 3 and South Loop Road; 40°45′11″N 73°57′31″W	Roosevelt Island	Built in 1861 by James Renwick Jr. to replace the earlier Penitentiary hospital. Demolished in 1994.
7	Fort Jay	Fort Jay	March 27, 1974 (#74001268)	Quadrangle Road; 40°41′29″N 74°00′59″W	Governors Island	A 1794 coastal star fort, built to defend New York Harbor. Now part of Governors Island National Monument.
8	Governor's House	Governor's House	April 26, 1973 (#73001217)	Building 2, Andes Road; 40°41′27″N 74°00′48″W	Governors Island	A historic house on Governors Island.
9	Governors Island	Governors Island	February 4, 1985 (#85002435)	Governors Island; 40°41′26″N 74°01′00″W	Governors Island	A 172-acre (70 ha) island in New York Harbor which has been expanded over time. Used by various military forces over time, it is now used for a variety of purposes.
10	Lighthouse	Lighthouse	March 16, 1972 (#72000876)	North end of Roosevelt Island; 40°46′22″N 73°56′26″W	Roosevelt Island	An 1872 lighthouse located at the northeast tip of Roosevelt Island in the East River.
11	The Octagon	The Octagon	March 16, 1972 (#72000880)	888 Main Street; 40°46′08″N 73°56′38″W	Roosevelt Island	Originally serving as the main entrance to the New York City Lunatic Asylum, which opened in 1841, it was designed by Alexander Jackson Davis.
12	Smallpox Hospital	Smallpox Hospital	March 16, 1972 (#72000881)	E Road; 40°45′06″N 73°57′36″W	Roosevelt Island	Originally designed by architect James Renwick Jr., the 100-bed hospital opened in 1856, when the area was known as Blackwell's Island. Its ruins have been stabilized and preserved.
13	Statue of Liberty Enlightening the World	Statue of Liberty Enlightening the World	September 14, 2017 (#100000829)	Liberty Island, New York Harbor; 40°41′21″N 74°02′40″W	Liberty Island	The iconic statue named Liberty Enlightening the World
14	Statue of Liberty National Monument, Ellis Island and Liberty Island	Statue of Liberty National Monument, Ellis Island and Liberty Island	October 15, 1966 (#66000058)	Liberty Island and Ellis Island, New York Harbor; 40°41′38″N 74°02′37″W	Liberty Island and Ellis Island	A National Monument that includes, Liberty Enlightening the World, commonly known as the Statue of Liberty, situated on Liberty Island, and the former immigration station at Ellis Island, including the Ellis Island Immigrant Hospital.
15	Strecker Memorial Laboratory	Strecker Memorial Laboratory	March 16, 1972 (#72000886)	E Road; 40°45′09″N 73°57′31″W	Roosevelt Island	Built in 1892 to serve as a laboratory for City Hospital, it was "the first institution in the nation for pathological and bacteriological research." The building was designed by architects Frederick Clarke Withers and Walter Dickson in the Romanesque Revival style.

== See also ==
- County: National Register of Historic Places listings in New York County, New York
- State: National Register of Historic Places listings in New York
- Municipal: List of New York City Designated Landmarks in Manhattan on Islands
