= Chapel of the Good Shepherd (Roosevelt Island) =

Church in Manhattan, New York

- U.S. National Register of Historic Places
- New York State Register of Historic Places
- New York City Landmark
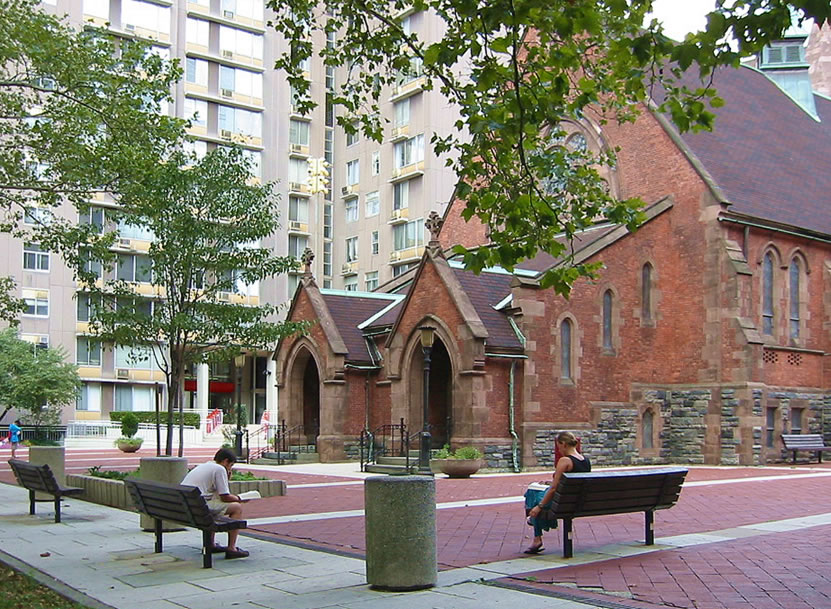

- Location within New York City Location within New York Location within the United States
- Location: 543 Main Street, Roosevelt Island; Manhattan, New York, US
- Coordinates: 40°45′42.7″N 73°57′0.9″W
- Built: 1888
- Architect: Frederick Clarke Withers
- NRHP reference No.: 72000865
- NYSRHP No.: 06101.002469
- NYCL No.: 0907

Significant dates
- Added to NRHP: March 16, 1972
- Designated NYSRHP: June 23, 1980
- Designated NYCL: March 23, 1976

The Chapel of the Good Shepherd is a historic Episcopal church at 543 Main Street on Roosevelt Island, part of the borough of Manhattan, New York City, United States. Designed by architect Frederick Clarke Withers and built in 1888, it was originally an Episcopal chapel and is now the Good Shepherd Community Ecumenical Center, used for Episcopal worship services and by other groups.

== History ==
The chapel was built in 1888, the cost of which was covered by a member of Grace Church Parish. The chapel's first minister was Rev. William G. French, who had been a missionary on the island for fifteen years prior.

The chapel was listed on the National Register of Historic Places in 1972, and was restored in 2003.

== See also ==
- List of New York City Designated Landmarks in Manhattan on Islands
- National Register of Historic Places listings in Manhattan on islands
