= Lighthouse Park (Roosevelt Island) =

Park in Manhattan, New York, United States

Coordinates: 40°46′19″N 73°56′27″W

Lighthouse Park is at the northern end of Roosevelt Island and its three acres includes Blackwell Island Light as well as a new public art piece called The Girl Puzzle honoring Nellie Bly and her work on the island's asylum.

The park, which stretches from the lighthouse south to Coler Hospital, was designed by landscape architect Nicholas Quennell in 1977 following the lighthouse's decommission.
