= Smallpox Hospital =

Building in Manhattan, New York

- U.S. National Register of Historic Places
- New York State Register of Historic Places
- New York City Landmark
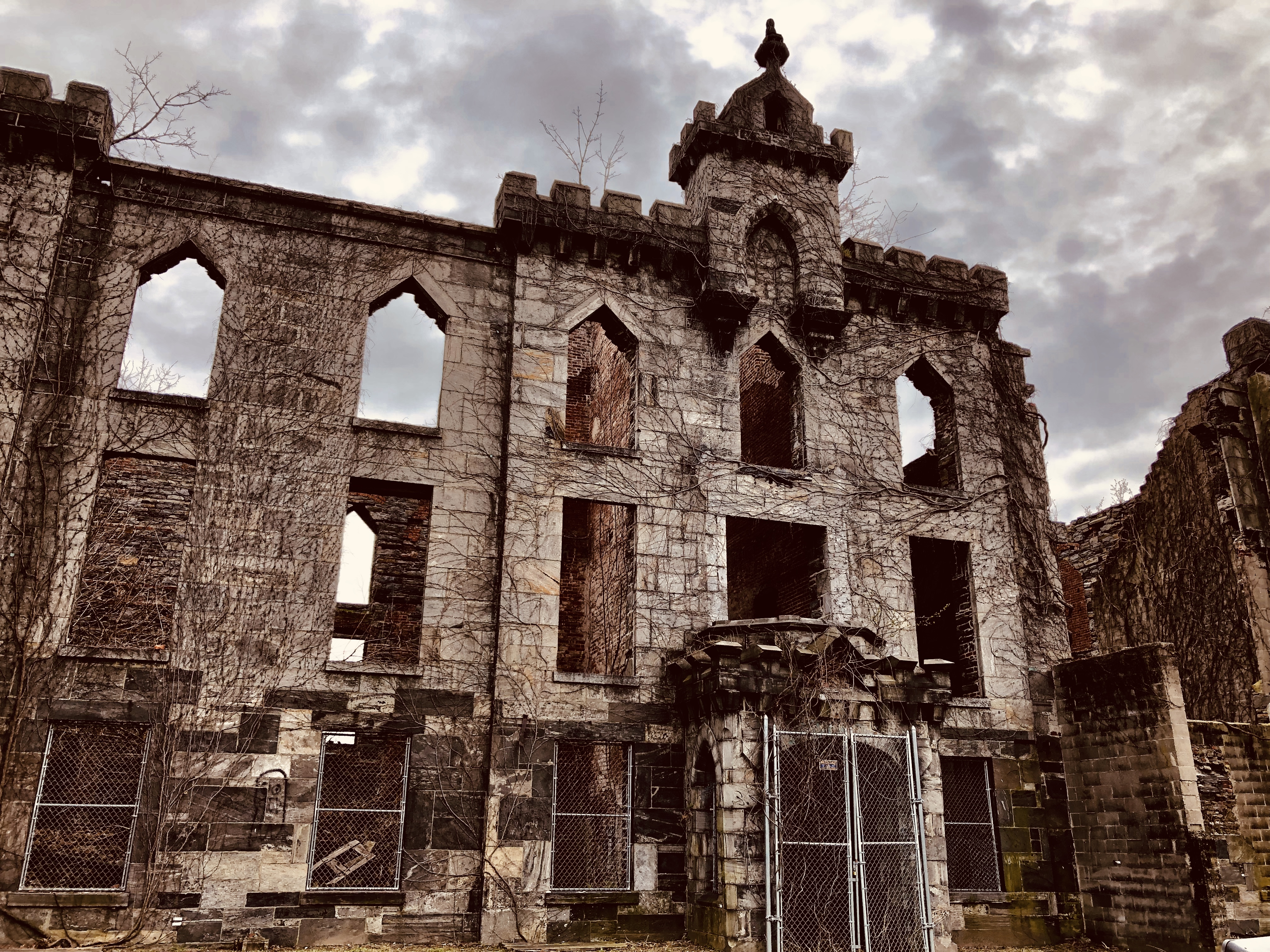
- Seen in April 2019

- Location within New York City Location within New York Location within the United States
- Location: Roosevelt Island, Manhattan, New York City
- Coordinates: 40°45′6″N 73°57′34″W
- Area: 0.9 acres (3,600 m^{2})
- Built: Main building: 1854-56; South wing: 1903-04; North wing: 1904-05
- Architects: James Renwick Jr. (main building); York & Sawyer (south wing); Renwick, Aspinwall & Owen (north wing)
- Architectural style: Gothic Revival
- NRHP reference No.: 72000881
- NYSRHP No.: 06101.000496
- NYCL No.: 0908

Significant dates
- Added to NRHP: March 16, 1972
- Designated NYSRHP: June 23, 1980
- Designated NYCL: March 23, 1976

The Smallpox Hospital, sometimes referred to as the Renwick Smallpox Hospital and later the Maternity and Charity Hospital Training School, was a hospital located on Roosevelt Island in Manhattan, New York City. Originally designed by architect James Renwick Jr., the 100-bed hospital opened in 1856, when the area was known as Blackwell's Island.

A century after it opened, the hospital was closed, and the building eventually fell into disrepair. It was listed on the National Register of Historic Places in 1972 and designated a New York City Landmark four years later, the only ruin in the city with that designation. After the completion of an ongoing $4.5 million stabilization project, the Smallpox Hospital ruins will be open to the public.

== Building ==
The hospital is situated at the southern tip of the island, adjacent to Franklin D. Roosevelt Four Freedoms Park. Renwick designed the main building. The south wing, built in 1903–04, was designed by York & Sawyer, while the north wing (1904–05) was designed by Renwick, Aspinwall & Owen. When completed, it was a three-story, nine-bay U-shaped structure faced in granite veneer in a random ashlar pattern over load-bearing rubble masonry. The central block has a hipped roof, with corbeled crenelated parapets on the projecting sections, with a simple cornice on the non-projecting sections. Crenelated polygonal chimneys rise from the southeast side of the main block. The two wings, which project from the ends of the northwest (front) facade, had mansard roofs.

At the center of the front facade is the main entrance. It has a porch open on three sides, oriel window above and projecting corbeled feature above the roofline. A wide pointed arch holds the main entrance. Though designed in the Gothic Revival style, all of the windows on the third floor have pointed arches without curves, unusual for that architectural style.

== History ==
=== Hospital and school ===
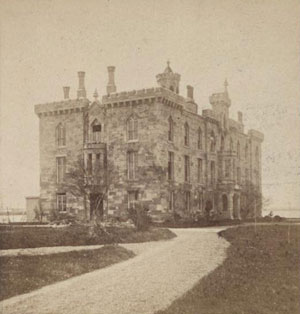
The hospital circa 1870

Despite the availability of the smallpox vaccine, New York City still had large outbreaks of the disease, due to the arrival of infected immigrants. Located on the isolated southern tip of the island in an attempt to quarantine patients, the hospital contained a large charity ward in addition to private rooms on the upper floors. In 1875, the hospital closed and became a training center for nurses attached to City Hospital, later renamed Charity Hospital. Renwick designed the building in the Gothic Revival style, and in 1903–1905, two wings with the same architectural theme were added to the school, named the Home for the Nurses and the Maternity and Charity Hospital Training School, to accommodate the growing student base. In deference to the changing use of the island, in 1921 Blackwell's Island was renamed Welfare Island, and many of the structures there fell into disrepair as they became obsolete. In the 1950s, both Charity Hospital and the nurses school were closed, and their operations moved to new buildings in Queens.

=== "Renwick Ruin" ===
Both buildings fell into disrepair, eventually becoming ruins. In the 1970s, architect Giorgio Cavaglieri inspected them both, making plans to reinforce the walls of the Smallpox Hospital. In 1972, the hospital was added to the National Register of Historic Places, making it New York City's "only landmarked ruin." In 1973, Welfare Island was renamed as Roosevelt Island after former President Franklin D. Roosevelt. Often referred to as the Renwick Ruin, the Neo-Gothic ruins have been illuminated nightly since 1995, in a somewhat successful effort to raise funds for stabilizing the structure. However, on December 26, 2007, a section of the north wing collapsed, adding an urgency to preservation plans. On May 28, 2009, ground was broken on the Franklin D. Roosevelt Four Freedoms Park, which includes plans to stabilize the Smallpox Hospital, a memorial to Franklin D. Roosevelt, and a 14-acre (57,000 m^{2}) public area. After a $4.5 million stabilization project, the Smallpox Hospital ruins will be open to the public.

According to the AIA Guide to New York City, the remains of the Smallpox Hospital have the quality that architectural historian Paul Zucker, in his 1968 book Fascination of Decay, ascribed to ruins in general: "[A]n expression of an eerie romantic mood ... a palpable documentation of a period in the past ... something which recalls a specific concept of architectural space and proportion." The New York City Landmarks Preservation Commission, in its 1976 report designating the ruins a New York City landmark, speculated that "The Smallpox Hospital could easily become the American equivalent of the great Gothic ruins of England and Wales, such as the late 13th century Tintern Abbey in Monmouthshire, which has been admired and cherished since the 18th century as a romantic ruin," and described the building as "a picturesque ruin, one that could readily serve as the setting for a 19th century Gothic romance."

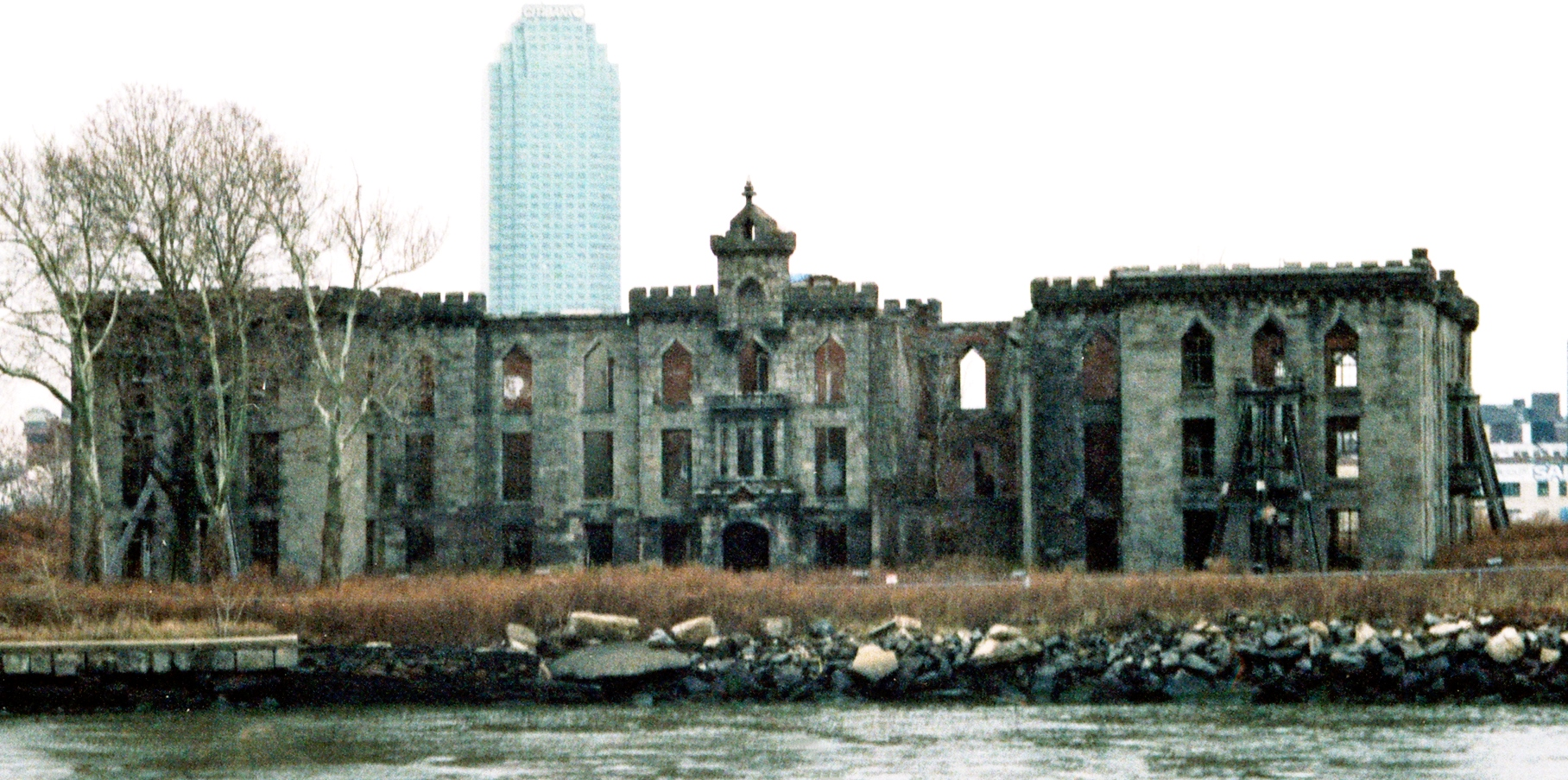
The hospital seen from the west in the East River, with the Citicorp Building in Queens in the background (1996)

== See also ==
- List of hospitals in Manhattan
- List of New York City Designated Landmarks in Manhattan on Islands
- National Register of Historic Places listings in Manhattan on islands
