= Martin E. Thompson =

American architect and artist

Martin Euclid Thompson
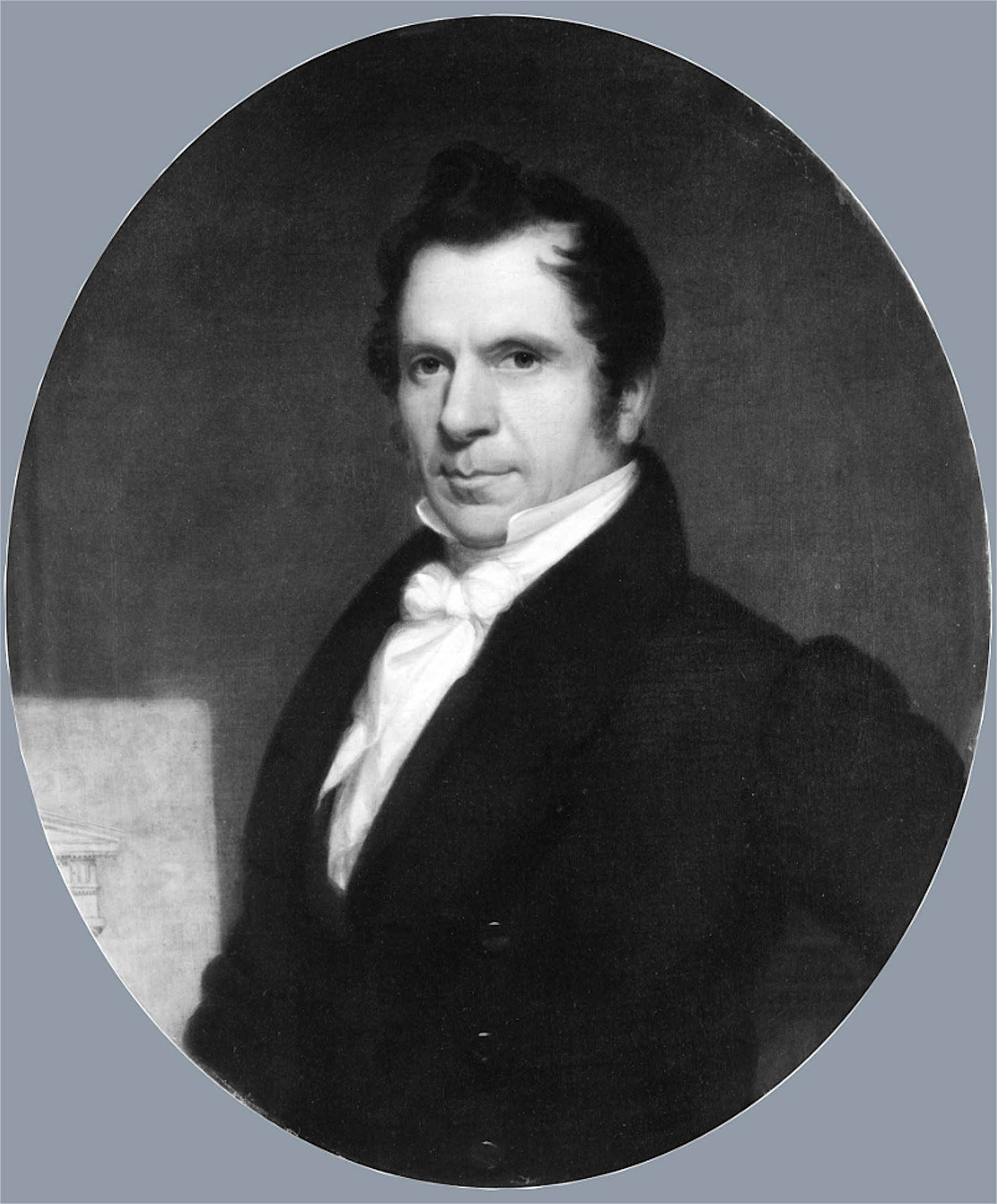
- Portrait by William Sidney Mount
- Born: 1786
- Died: 1877 (aged 90–91)
- Known for: Architect

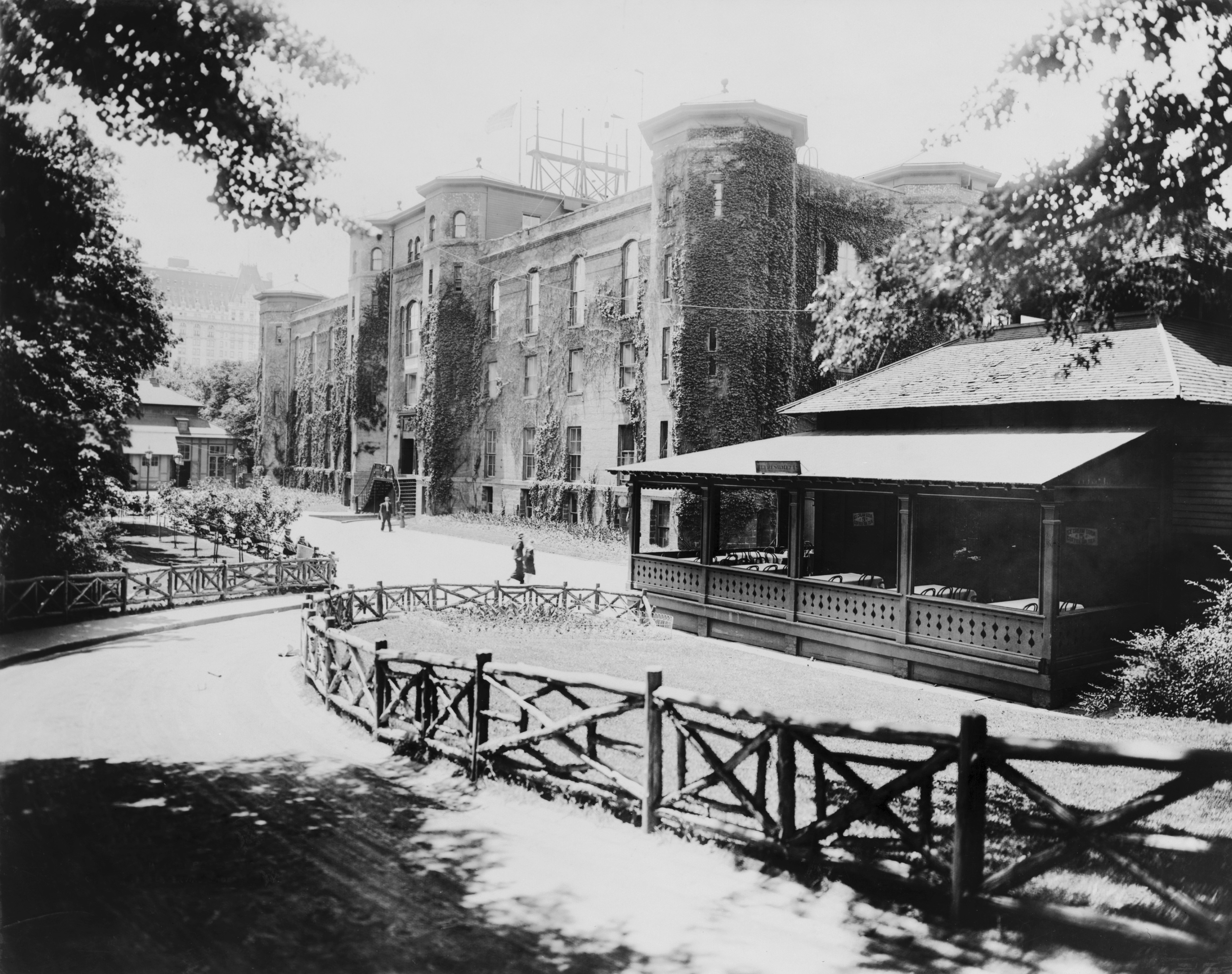
The Central Park Arsenal in 1914

Martin Euclid Thompson (1786–1877) was an American architect and artist prolific in nineteenth-century New York City, and a co-founder of the National Academy of Design.

Originally trained as a carpenter, he had been a partner of Ithiel Town and went on to become one of the founders of the National Academy of Design.

He designed the New York State Militia's Arsenal, which in the 1850s became part of Central Park. Thompson's symmetrical structure of brick in English bond, with headers every fifth course, presents a central block in the manner of a fortified gatehouse flanked by half-octagonal towers. The carpentry doorframe speaks of its purpose with an American eagle displayed between stacks of cannonballs over the door, and crossed sabers and stacked pikes represented in flanking panels.

== Works ==
- Second Branch Bank of the United States (1824), now preserved as a facade in the American Wing of the Metropolitan Museum of Art's main building
- Merchants Exchange Building (New York City), destroyed in the Great Fire of New York, December 1835.
- Brooklyn Naval Hospital, Brooklyn Navy Yard, Brooklyn (1830–38)
- His Greek Revival Colles Mansion (1838), Morristown, New Jersey, is now The Kellogg Club
- The Admiral's House (Governor's Island) (1843), Governors Island, New York City, landmarked July 24, 1972.
- The Arsenal (1847–1851), 830 Fifth Avenue, New York City (Note: The "other building by Martin Thompson in Central Park"— a trick question — is the façade of the Second Branch Bank of the United States (1824), re-erected at the American Wing, Metropolitan Museum of Art.)
