= The Octagon (Roosevelt Island) =

Building in Manhattan, New York

- U.S. National Register of Historic Places
- New York State Register of Historic Places
- New York City Landmark
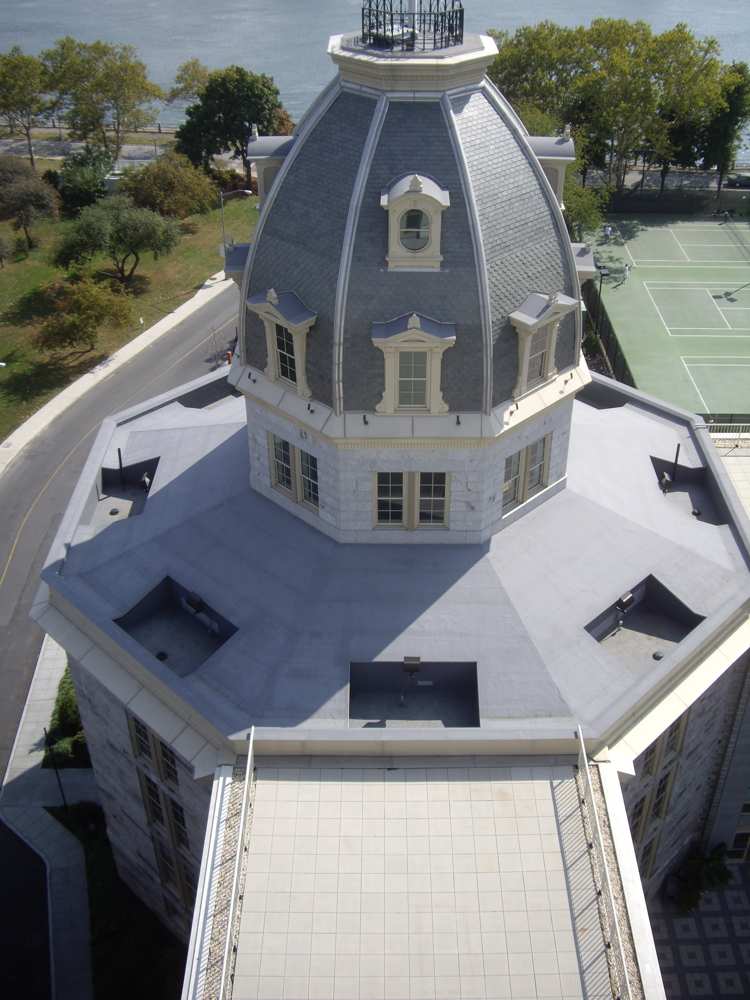
- Aerial view
- Interactive map highlighting the location of the Octagon
- Location: 888 Main Street, Roosevelt Island, Manhattan, NY, 10044 United States
- Coordinates: 40°46′8.42″N 73°56′38.13″W
- Built: 1835
- Architect: Alexander Jackson Davis
- Architectural style: Octagon Mode
- NRHP reference No.: 72000880
- NYSRHP No.: 06101.000499
- NYCL No.: 0910

Significant dates
- Added to NRHP: March 16, 1972
- Designated NYSRHP: June 23, 1980
- Designated NYCL: March 23, 1976

The Octagon, built in 1834, is a historic octagonal building and attached apartment block complex located at 888 Main Street on Roosevelt Island in New York City.

It originally served as the main entrance to the New York City Mental Health Hospital (also known as the New York City Lunatic Asylum), which opened in 1841. Designed by Alexander Jackson Davis, the five-story rotunda was made of blue-gray stone that was quarried on the island. The Octagon is the last remnant of the hospital, and after many years of decay and two fires, was close to ruin. After restoration, it has now been incorporated into the adjacent buildings to create a large apartment complex. Mistreatment of patients at the asylum was the center of the exposé by Nellie Bly in her 1887 book Ten Days in a Mad-House.

== History ==
The structure was built as part of the New York City Mental Health Hospital in 1841 and was incorporated into the Metropolitan Hospital in 1894. The Octagon, as a Metropolitan Hospital building, closed in 1955, leaving the building abandoned. On March 16, 1972, despite its condition, it was added to the National Register of Historic Places.

The Octagon was the last remnant of the hospital, and after many years of decay and two fires, was close to ruin. In April 2006, after restoration, the renovated Octagon reopened as the lobby entrance to a pair of adjacent apartment buildings with 500 units in total.

=== Sustainability ===
The new apartment complex uses both solar panels and fuel cell installations. A 50 kW array of solar panels and a 400 kW fuel cell enable the building to generate more than 50% of its power. The fuel cell is a combined heat and power system that converts natural gas to electricity and heat via a combustion-free, electrochemical process. This system provides power and heat that meets the majority of the building's energy demand, and the efficiency it achieves is higher than the energy received from the power grid. Not only does the system provide more efficient energy usage, the heat from the process is also used for the building's space heating and domestic water requirements. Thus the Octagon is projected to reduce its carbon emissions by 790 metric tons annually.

The Octagon received the largest initial award of New York State Green Building Tax Credits and was recognized in the first New York City Green Buildings Competition with the "Green Apple Award" for leadership in applying sustainable design principles to residential development. In 2006, a newly constructed residential building was built on the site, modeled on the original structure. It received LEED Silver status from the U.S. Green Building Council in 2008.

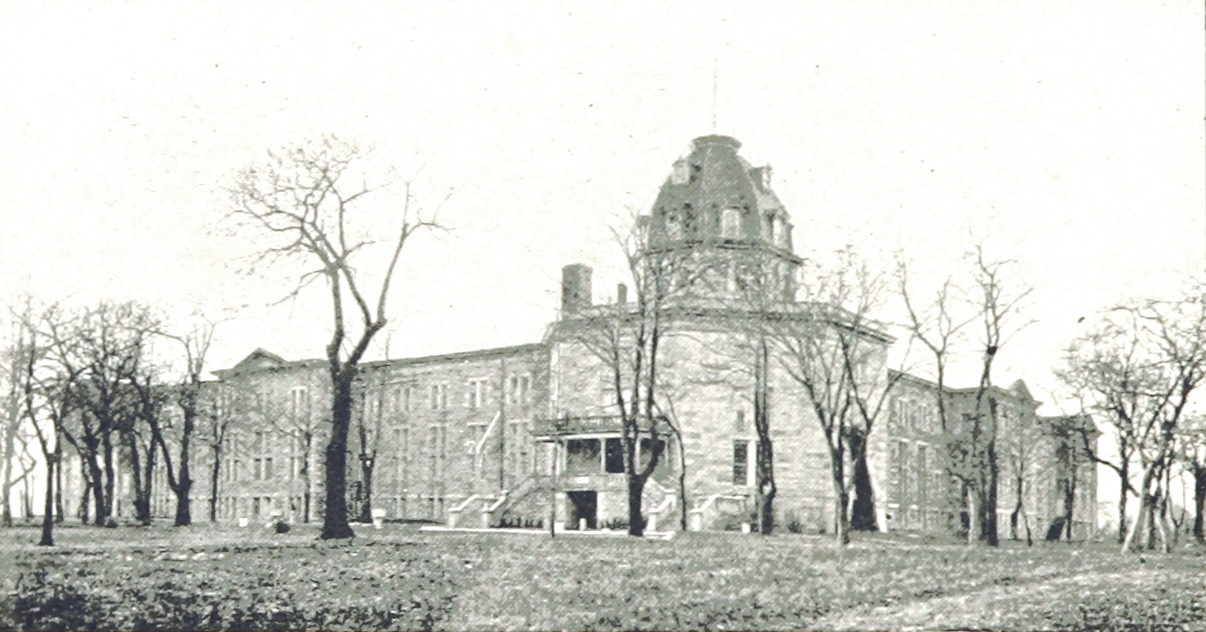
The main building in 1893

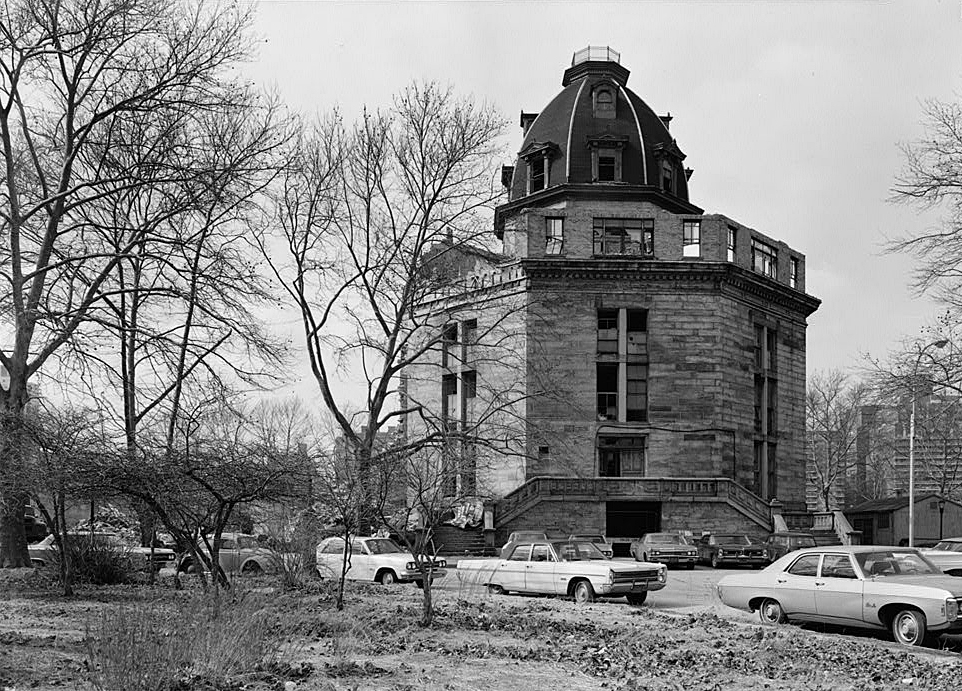
Rotunda as it appeared in 1970

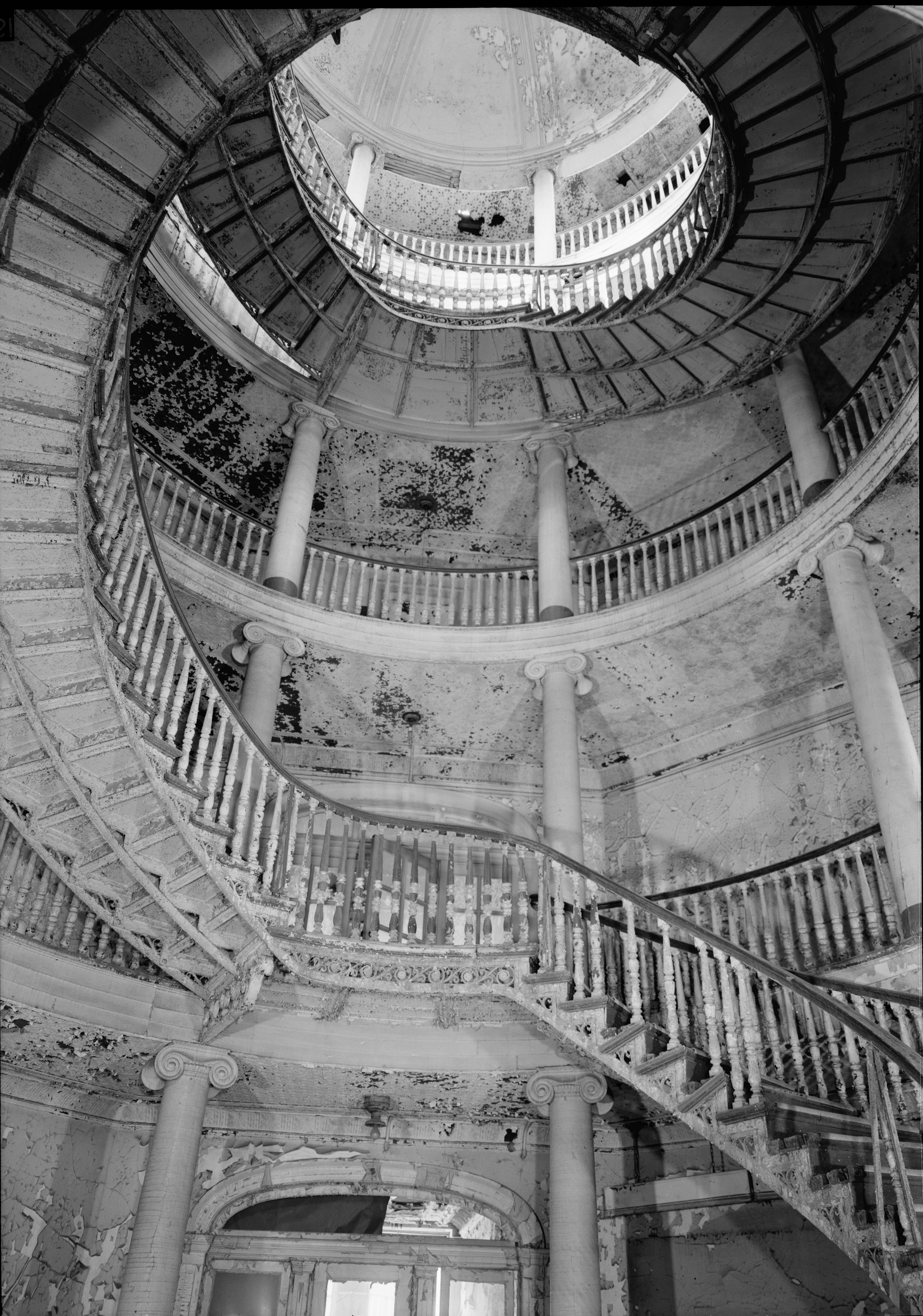
Original interior stairway

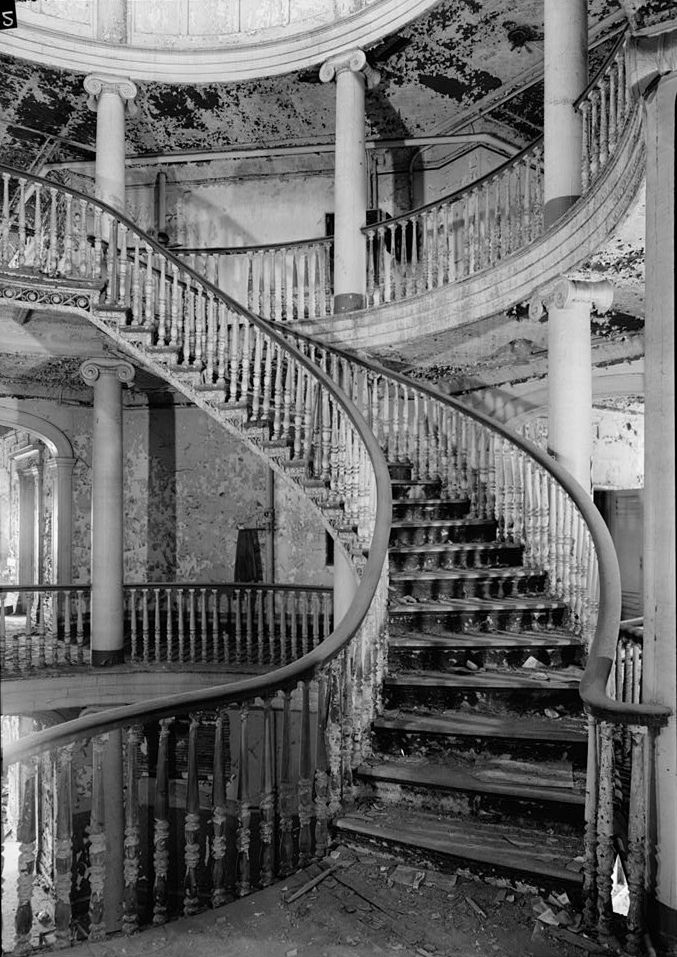
Original interior stairway, second floor

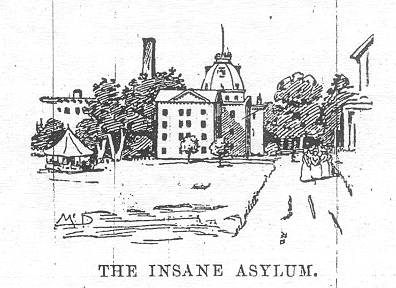
As depicted in Ten Days in a Mad-House

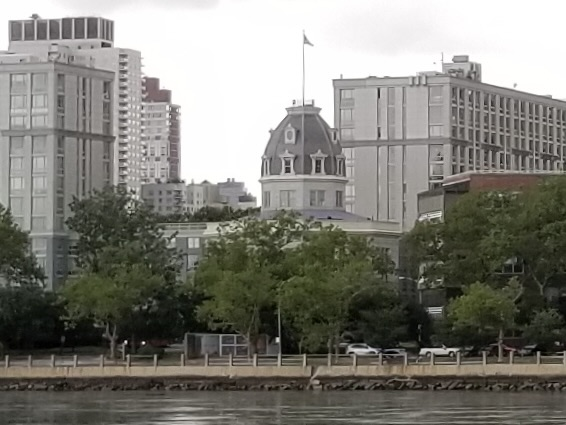
Appearance in 2017

== See also ==
- List of octagonal buildings and structures
- List of New York City Designated Landmarks in Manhattan on Islands
- National Register of Historic Places listings in Manhattan on islands
