= QC Spa =

Spa in New York City

Coordinates: 40°41′34″N 74°1′4″W

- Trade name: QC NY Spa, qc ny
- Company type: Private
- Industry: Spa, Wellness
- Founded: 2022
- Headquarters: Governors Island, New York Harbor, New York City, United States
- Area served: New York City
- Products: Spa services, outdoor pools

The QC Spa, sometimes known as QC NY Spa or QC NY and styled qc ny is a spa on Governors Island in New York Harbor in New York City. When it opened in former army barracks in 2022 following construction throughout COVID, it was the first QC Terme spa located outside of Europe and housed the only outdoor pools open year-round in New York City. In 2024, the spa expanded into the adjacent building and will eventually comprise 100,000 square feet (9,300 m^{2}).

The buildings, originally naval officers' spaces that date from 1934, were designed by McKim, Mead and White and restored for the spa by Robert D. Henry.
