= List of companies of Canada =

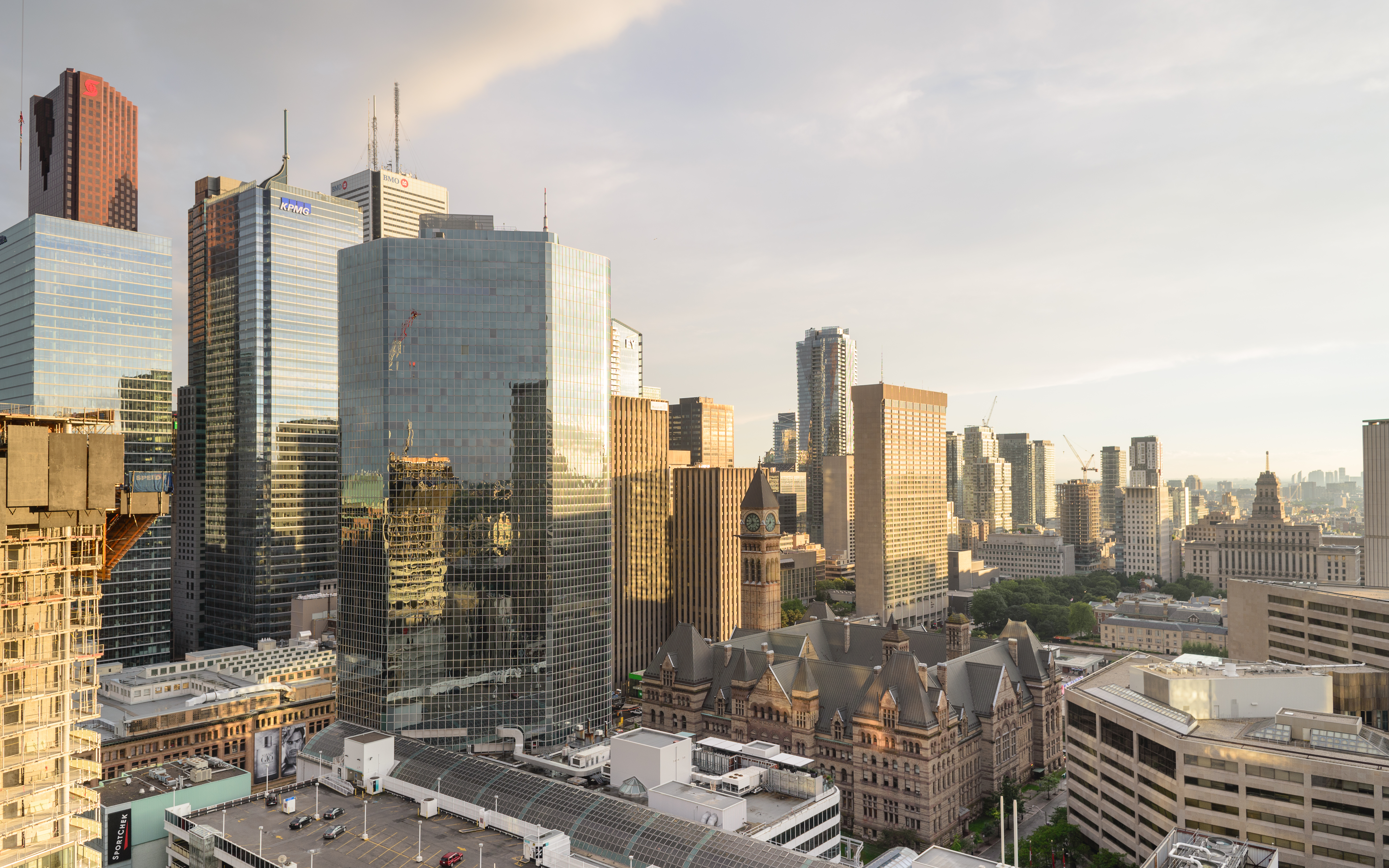
Toronto, the financial centre and most populous city of Canada

This list of companies of Canada details the nation's private sector and represents a large part of the Canadian economy. A member of the G7 and OECD, Canada maintains the 11th-largest economy in the world. Its private sector is dominated by commercial enterprises, with real estate, banking, and healthcare being among the largest contributors to economic output. Canada's primary stock market is the Toronto Stock Exchange (TSX), listing over 3,500 companies. The private sector accounts for nearly 80% of the Canadian labour market, evenly spread across ten provinces.

For further information on the types of business entities in this country and their abbreviations, see business entities in Canada.

== Largest firms ==
This list shows firms in the Fortune Global 2000, which ranks the top five firms by total revenues reported before January 31, 2026. Canada's financial sector is the Canadian economy's largest, with much of its banking industry based in Toronto.

Rank	Name	Sector	Revenues (USD $B)	Employees	Notes
1	Royal Bank of Canada	Banking	$12.90	100,000	Multinational financial services company based in Toronto
2	TD Bank	Banking	$6.39	95,000	Multinational financial services company based in Toronto
3	Bank of Montreal	Banking	$5.92	54,000	Multinational financial services company based in Montreal
4	Canadian Imperial Bank	Banking	$5.48	50,000	Multinational financial services company based in Toronto
5	Scotiabank	Banking	$4.88	88,000	Multinational financial services company based in Toronto

== Notable firms ==
This list includes notable companies with primary headquarters located in the country. The industry and sector follow the Industry Classification Benchmark taxonomy. Organizations which have ceased operations are included and noted as defunct.

Notable companies Status: P=Private, S=State; A=Active, D=Defunct
Name	Industry	Sector	Headquarters	Founded	Notes	Status	
1-800-GOT-JUNK?	Industrials	Waste & disposal services	Vancouver	1989	Junk removal	P	A
Norda Stelo	Industrials	Construction & Materials	Quebec City	1963	Integrated projects	P	A
3Way International Logistics	Industrials	Business support services	Mississauga	2001	Freight forwarding	P	A
A Buck or Two	Consumer services	Specialty retailers	Vaughan	1988	Retail	P	A
A&W	Consumer services	Restaurants & bars	North Vancouver	1956	Fast food chain	P	A
ABS Friction	Manufacturing	Brake pads	Guelph, Ontario	1995	Vehicle aftermarket	P	A
Access Communications	Telecommunications	Fixed line telecommunications	Regina	1974	Cable television provider	P	A
Ache Records	Consumer services	Broadcasting & entertainment	Vancouver	1999	Record label	P	A
Addition Elle	Consumer services	Apparel retailers	Montreal	1967	Women's clothing retailer, defunct 2020	P	D
Advanced Cyclotron Systems	Health care	Medical equipment	Richmond	2003	Medical cyclotrons	P	A
Affinity Credit Union	Financials	Banks	Saskatoon	2005	Credit union	P	A
Air Canada	Consumer services	Airlines	Montreal	1937	Flag carrier, largest airline of Canada	P	A
Air Miles	Consumer services	Travel & tourism	Toronto	1992	Loyalty programs	P	A
Aldo Group	Consumer services	Apparel retailers	Montreal	1972	Footwear retailer	P	A
AldrichPears Associates	Industrials	Business support services	Vancouver	1979	Exhibit design	P	A
Algonquin Power & Utilities	Utilities	Alternative electricity	Oakville	1997	Renewable energy	P	A
Allied Shipbuilders	Industrials	Commercial vehicles & trucks	North Vancouver	1948	Shipyard	P	A
Alta Newspaper Group	Consumer services	Publishing	Vancouver	1999	Media holding	P	A
Alterra Power	Utilities	Alternative electricity	Vancouver	2011	Renewable energy	P	A
Angoss	Technology	Software	Toronto	1984	Analytic software	P	A
Apotex	Health care	Pharmaceuticals	Toronto	1974	Generic pharmaceuticals	P	A
Appnovation	Technology	Software	Vancouver	2007	Software developer	P	A
Arc'teryx	Consumer services	Apparel retailers	North Vancouver	1989	Outdoor apparel/equipment	P	A
Orano Canada	Basic materials	General mining	Saskatoon	1964	Uranium	P	A
Aritzia	Consumer goods	Clothing & accessories	Vancouver	1984	Clothing	P	A
Army & Navy Stores	Consumer services	Broadline retailer	Vancouver	1919	Discount department stores, defunct 2020	P	D
Arsenal Pulp Press	Consumer services	Publishing	Vancouver	1971	Book publisher	P	A
ATB Financial	Financials	Asset management	Edmonton	1938	State financial services	S	A
ATI Technologies	Technology	Semiconductors	Markham	1985	Semiconductors, defunct 2006	P	D
AtkinsRéalis	Industrials	Diversified industrials	Montreal	1911	Engineering, construction	P	A
Atmosphere Visual Effects	Consumer services	Broadcasting & entertainment	Vancouver	2003	Movie special effects	P	A
Atwill-Morin	Basic materials	Construction & Materials	Montreal	2007	Masonry restoration, heritage preservation	P	A
Ballard Power Systems	Industrials	Electrical components & equipment	Burnaby	1979	Fuel cells	P	A
Banff Lodging Co	Consumer services	Hotels	Banff	1985	Lodges	P	A
Bank of Montreal	Financials	Banks	Montreal	1817	Bank	P	A
Bard Ventures	Basic materials	General mining	Vancouver	1981	Molybdenum mining	P	A
Barrick Mining	Basic materials	Gold mining	Toronto	1983	Gold extraction	P	A
Bausch Health	Health care	Pharmaceuticals	Laval	1960	Specialty pharmaceuticals	P	A
BBC Kids	Consumer services	Broadcasting & entertainment	Burnaby	2001	Children's television	P	A
BC Hydro	Utilities	Alternative electricity	Vancouver	1961	Hydro-electric	S	A
BC Research	Industrials	Business support services	Vancouver	1944	Research, defunct 2007	P	D
Becker's	Consumer services	Specialty retailers	Toronto	1957	Retail chains	P	A
Bell Canada	Telecommunications	Fixed line telecommunications	Montreal	1880	Telecom, part of BCE Inc	P	A
Bell MTS	Telecommunications	Fixed line telecommunications	Winnipeg	1905	Telecom, part of BCE Inc	P	A
Ben Moss Jewellers	Consumer services	Specialty retailers	Winnipeg	1910	Jewelry retailer	P	A
Bennett Environmental	Industrials	Waste & disposal services	Oakville	1991	Defunct 2013	P	D
Big Blue Bubble	Technology	Software	London	2004	Software firm, mobile games	P	A
BigPark	Technology	Software	Vancouver	2007	Software firm, part of Microsoft (US)	P	D
Biovail	Health care	Pharmaceuticals	Mississauga	1991	Pharmaceutical, defunct 2010	P	D
BioWare	Technology	Software	Edmonton	1995	Video games, part of Electronic Arts (US)	P	A
Bison Transport	Industrials	Delivery services	Winnipeg	1969	Transportation and logistics	P	A
Black Diamond Cheese	Consumer goods	Food products	Belleville	1933	Cheese, part of Parmalat (Italy)	P	A
Black Hen Music	Consumer services	Broadcasting & entertainment	Vancouver	1995	Record label	P	A
Black Press	Consumer services	Publishing	Surrey	1975	Publishing and media	P	A
Blacks Photo Corporation	Consumer services	Recreational services	Montreal	1930	Photo printing, now only online	P	A
BlackBerry Limited	Technology	Telecommunications equipment	Waterloo	1984	Wireless devices	P	A
Blackburn Radio	Consumer services	Broadcasting & entertainment	London	1968	Radio	P	A
Blake, Cassels & Graydon	Industrials	Business support services	Toronto	1856	Law firm	P	A
Bleeding Art Industries	Consumer services	Broadcasting & entertainment	Calgary	2002	Special effects	P	A
Blenz Coffee	Consumer services	Restaurants & bars	Vancouver	1992	Coffee chain	P	A
Blue Giant Equipment Corporation	Industrials	Industrial machinery	Toronto	1963	Loading dock equipment	P	A
Bluenotes	Consumer goods	Clothing & accessories	Toronto	1984	Clothing brand	P	A
Boeing Canada	Industrials	Aerospace	Winnipeg	1934	Aircraft, part of Boeing (US)	P	A
Bombardier	Industrials	Aerospace	Montreal	1942	Aircraft	P	A
BRP Inc.	Consumer goods	Recreational products	Valcourt	1942	Spun off as an independent company in 2003	P	A
Book City	Consumer services	Specialty retailers	Toronto	1976	Bookstores	P	A
Boston Pizza	Consumer services	Restaurants & bars	Richmond	1964	Pizza chain	P	A
Boutique La Vie en Rose	Consumer services	Apparel retailers	Montreal	1984	Lingerie retailer	P	A
Bowring Brothers	Consumer services	Broadline retailers	St. John's	1811	General retail stores	P	A
Bre-X	Basic materials	Gold mining	Calgary	1989	Completely collapsed in 1997	P	D
Brick Brewing Company	Consumer goods	Brewers	Waterloo	1984	Brewery	P	A
Brightlight Pictures	Consumer services	Broadcasting & entertainment	Vancouver	2001	Production company	P	A
BrightSide Technologies	Consumer goods	Consumer electronics	Vancouver	2004	Display technology, merged into Dolby Laboratories	P	D
Brookfield Corporation	Financials	Asset managers	Toronto	1899	Asset management firm	P	A
Bruce Power	Utilities	Conventional electricity	Tiverton	2001	Nuclear power	P	A
Brunet	Consumer services	Drug retailers	Montreal	1855	Pharmacies	P	A
Buckley's	Health care	Pharmaceuticals	Mississauga	1919	Medicine	P	A
Buhler Industries	Industrials	Commercial vehicles & trucks	Winnipeg	1969	Farm vehicles and equipment	P	A
Bullfrog Power	Utilities	Alternative electricity	Toronto	2005	Low-carbon electricity	P	A
Cactus Club Cafe	Consumer services	Restaurants & bars	North Vancouver	1988	Restaurant chain	P	A
Cadillac Fairview	Financials	Real estate holding & development	Toronto	1974	Property development and management	P	A
CAE Inc.	Industrials	Business training & employment agencies	Montreal	1947	Flight simulators and training	P	A
Cafection	Consumer goods	Consumer electronics	Quebec City	1996	Coffee Machines	P	A
Calm Air	Consumer services	Airlines	Winnipeg	1962	Airline	P	A
Cameco	Basic materials	General mining	Saskatoon	1988	Uranium	P	A
Bimbo Canada	Consumer goods	Food products	Toronto	1911	Bread, part of Grupo Bimbo (Mexico)	P	A
Canada Deposit Insurance Corporation	Financials	Specialty finance	Ottawa	1967	Government-owned bank account insurance company	S	A
Canada Post	Industrials	Delivery services	Ottawa	1867	Postal services	S	A
Canada Wide Media	Consumer services	Publishing	Burnaby	1976	Publisher	P	A
Canadian Bank Note Company	Industrials	Business support services	Ottawa	1897	Money and passport printing	P	A
Canadian Broadcasting Corporation (CBC)	Consumer services	Broadcasting & entertainment	Ottawa	1936	Government-owned Canadian TV and radio broadcaster	S	A
Canadian Hydro Developers	Utilities	Alternative electricity	Calgary	1989	Hydro power generation, defunct 2009	P	D
Canadian Imperial Bank of Commerce (CIBC)	Financials	Banks	Toronto	1961	Banking	P	A
Canadian Light Source	Industrials	Business support services	Saskatoon	1999	Research	P	A
Canadian National	Industrials	Railroads	Montreal	1918	Railway	P	A
Canadian Natural Resources	Oil & gas	Exploration & production	Calgary	1973	Oil and gas development and production	P	A
Canadian Oil Sands	Oil & gas	Exploration & production	Calgary	1978	Oil production, part of Suncor Energy	P	A
Canadian Pacific	Industrials	Railroads	Calgary	1881	Railway	P	A
Canadian Plasma Resources	Health care	Biotechnology	Saskatoon	2012	Bio-pharmaceutical	P	A
Canadian Steamship Lines	Industrials	Marine transportation	Montreal	1845	Cargo shipping	P	A
Canadian Tire	Consumer goods	Tires	Toronto	1922	Retail	P	A
Canadian Tire Bank	Financials	Consumer financing	Oakville	2003	Credit card company, part of Canadian Tire	P	A
Canadian Western Bank	Financials	Banks	Edmonton	1988	Banking, defunct 2025	P	D
Canadian Wheat Board	Consumer goods	Farming & fishing	Winnipeg	1935	Agri-business, defunct 2015	P	D
Canalta Hotels	Consumer services	Hotels	Drumheller	1979	Hotel chain in Western Canada	P	A
Candente Copper	Basic materials	Nonferrous metals	Vancouver	1997	Copper mining	P	A
Cangene Corp.	Health care	Biotechnology	Winnipeg	1984	Biotech, defunct 2014	P	D
CanJet	Consumer services	Airlines	Enfield	2002	Low-cost airline, defunct 2015	P	D
Canpotex	Basic materials	General mining	Saskatoon	1970	Potash export	P	A
Canucks Sports & Entertainment	Consumer services	Broadcasting & entertainment	Vancouver	1995	Owns Vancouver Canucks	P	A
Canwest	Consumer services	Broadcasting & entertainment	Winnipeg	1974	Broadcaster, defunct 2010	P	D
Capcom Vancouver	Technology	Software	Burnaby	2005	Game developer, part of Capcom (Japan)	P	D
Cargill Ltd.	Consumer goods	Farming & fishing	Winnipeg	1928	Agriculture, part of Cargill (US)	P	A
Casavant Frères	Consumer goods	Recreational products	Saint-Hyacinthe	1879	Organs	P	A
Cascades	Industrials	Containers & packaging	Kingsey Falls	1957	Packaging and tissues	P	A
Catalyst Paper	Basic materials	Paper	Richmond	2000	Pulp and paper	P	A
Cedarlane Laboratories	Manufacturing	Research products	Burlington, Ontario	1957	Life science research	P	A
Celestica	Industrials	Electronic equipment	Toronto	1994	Electronics	P	A
Cellcom Communications	Telecommunications	Fixed line telecommunications	Montreal	1985	Part of BCE Inc	P	A
Cenovus Energy	Oil & gas	Integrated oil & gas	Calgary	2009	Oil & gas	P	A
Centra Gas Manitoba	Utilities	Alternative electricity	Winnipeg	1991	Utility, part of Manitoba Hydro	S	A
Central Heat Distribution	Utilities	Multiutilities	Vancouver	1968	District heating	P	A
Central Mountain Air	Consumer services	Airlines	Smithers	1987	Regional airline	P	A
CGI Group	Industrials	Business support services	Montreal	1976	IT consulting	P	A
Chapters	Consumer services	Specialty retailers	Toronto	1995	Book store chain	P	A
CHC Helicopter	Consumer services	Airlines	Richmond	1947	Helicopter services	P	A
Choices Market	Consumer services	Food retailers & wholesalers	Delta	1990	Supermarkets	P	A
CHUM Limited	Consumer services	Broadcasting & entertainment	Toronto	1945	Broadcaster, defunct 2007	P	D
Cineplex Entertainment	Consumer services	Recreational services	Toronto	1999	Theater chain	P	A
Cirque du Soleil	Consumer services	Recreational services	Montreal	1984	Entertainment	P	A
CityWest	Telecommunications	Fixed line telecommunications	Prince Rupert	1910	Telephone/cable company	S	A
Coachman Insurance Company	Financials	Full line insurance	Toronto	1979	Insurance	P	A
Coast Capital Savings	Financials	Banks	Surrey	1940	Federal credit union, banking	P	A
Coffee Time	Consumer services	Restaurants & bars	Toronto	1982	Coffee shops	P	A
Cognos	Technology	Software	Ottawa	1969	Software, merged into IBM	P	D
Colt Canada	Industrials	Defense	Kitchener	2005	Arms, part of Colt's Manufacturing Company (US)	P	A
Comm100	Technology	Software	Vancouver	2009	Live chat software provider	P	A
Conestoga-Rovers & Associates	Industrials	Heavy construction	Waterloo	1976	Engineering and construction	P	A
Conexus Credit Union	Financials	Banks	Regina	1937	Financial services	P	A
Continental Newspapers	Consumer services	Publishing	Kelowna	1999	Regional newspapers	P	A
Cookie Jar Group	Consumer services	Broadcasting & entertainment	Toronto	1976	Defunct 2014	P	D
Corby Spirit and Wine	Consumer goods	Distillers & vintners	Toronto	1859	Alcohol	P	A
Cordiant Capital	Financials	Asset management	Montreal	1999	Investment management	P	A
Corel	Technology	Software	Ottawa	1985	Graphics software	P	A
Corma Inc.	Manufacturing	Corrugated plastic pipe	Toronto	1973	Production systems	P	A
Corus Entertainment	Consumer services	Broadcasting & entertainment	Toronto	1999	Entertainment company	P	A
Coteau Books	Consumer services	Publishing	Regina	1975	Publisher, defunct 2020	P	D
Cott	Consumer goods	Soft drinks	Mississauga	1952	Soft drinks	P	A
Country Style	Consumer services	Restaurants & bars	Richmond Hill	1962	Coffee shops	P	A
Creation Technologies	Industrials	Electronic equipment	Burnaby	1989	Electronics manufacturing services	P	A
Crestline Coach	Industrials	Commercial vehicles & trucks	Saskatoon	1979	Ambulances	P	A
Expedia CruiseShipCenters	Consumer services	Travel & tourism	Vancouver	1987	Travel agents, part of Expedia Group (US)	P	A
CSA Group	Industrials	Business support services	Mississauga	1919	Standards/testing lab	P	A
CTBC Bank (Canada)	Financials	Banks	Vancouver	1999	Subsidiary of CTBC Bank (Taiwan)	P	A
CTV Television Network	Consumer services	Broadcasting & entertainment	Toronto	1961	Television, part of BCE Inc	P	A
Cymax Stores	Consumer services	Broadline retailer	Burnaby	2004	Online retailer	P	A
Cyntech	Oil & gas	Oil equipment & services	Calgary	1981	Oil & gas support services	P	A
Dairyland Canada	Consumer goods	Food products	Burnaby	1992	Purchased by Saputo Inc	P	D
Daiya	Consumer goods	Food products	Vancouver	2008	Cheese company	P	A
Dare Foods	Consumer goods	Food products	Kitchener	1919	Food processing	P	A
Dart Flipcards	Consumer goods	Toys	Saint-Laurent	1988	Novelty goods	P	A
Decor Cabinets	Consumer goods	Furnishings	Morden	1977	Cabinets	P	A
Delta Hotels	Consumer services	Hotels	Richmond	1962	Part of Marriott International (US)	P	A
Descartes Systems Group	Technology	Software	Waterloo	1981	Logistics software	P	A
Desjardins Group	Financials	Banks	Lévis	1900	Credit unions	P	A
DHX Media	Consumer services	Broadcasting & entertainment	Halifax	2006	Media, television	P	A
Digital Extremes	Technology	Software	London	1993	Video games	P	A
Digitcom	Telecommunications	Fixed line telecommunications	Toronto	1991	Telecom, defunct 2023	P	D
Top Aces	Industrials	Defense	Montreal	2000	Defence contractor	P	A
Discovery Air	Industrials	Aerospace	Toronto	2004	Specialized aviation, defunct 2018	P	D
Dofasco	Basic materials	Iron & steel	Hamilton	1912	Steel, part of ArcelorMittal (Luxembourg)	P	A
Dollarama	Consumer services	Broadline retailer	Montreal	1992	Chain retailer	P	A
Dominion Voting Systems	Industrials	Electronic equipment	Toronto	2003	Electronic voting hardware	P	A
Domtar	Basic materials	Paper	Montreal	1848	Pulp and paper company	P	A
Donner Metals	Basic materials	General mining	Vancouver	1996	Mining	P	A
DreamCatcher Games	Technology	Software	Toronto	2011	Video games, defunct 2011	P	D
D-Wave Systems	Technology	Computer hardware	Burnaby	1999	Quantum computing	P	A
Dynamotive Energy Systems	Utilities	Alternative electricity	Richmond	1991	Renewable energy	P	A
DynaVenture	Industrials	Diversified industrials	Saskatoon	1948	Industrial holding	P	A
EA Black Box	Technology	Software	Burnaby	1998	Video games, defunct 2013	P	D
EA Vancouver	Technology	Software	Burnaby	1983	Video games, part of Electronic Arts (US)	P	A
Ebco Industries	Industrials	Diversified industrials	Richmond	1956	Fabrication and machining	P	A
Electrohome	Consumer goods	Consumer electronics	Kitchener	1907	Televisions, defunct 1984	P	D
EllisDon	Industrials	Heavy construction	Mississauga	1951	General contractor	P	A
Emera	Utilities	Conventional electricity	Halifax	1998	Power	P	A
Enbridge	Oil & gas	Pipelines	Calgary	1949	Energy transportation	P	A
Engineered Lifting Systems & Equipment	Industrials	Industrial machinery	Elmira	1971	Lifting systems and equipment	P	A
Enwave	Utilities	Multiutilities	Toronto	1969	District heating/cooling in Toronto	P	A
Esprida	Technology	Software	Mississauga	1999	Remote device management middleware	P	A
F&P Manufacturing	Consumer goods	Auto parts	Tottenham	1986	Japanese automotive parts supplier	P	A
Fairchild Group	Conglomerates	-	Vancouver	1983	Media, real estate, retail	P	A
Fairchild TV	Consumer services	Broadcasting & entertainment	Richmond	1993	Cantonese language television, part of Fairchild Group	P	A
Fairfax Financial	Financials	Full line insurance	Toronto	1985	Insurance holding	P	A
Fairmont Hotels and Resorts	Consumer services	Hotels	Toronto	1907	Hotel chain	P	A
Falconbridge Ltd.	Basic materials	General mining	Toronto	1928	Mining, defunct 2006	P	D
Farmbucks	Technology	Agricultural products	Alberta	2018	P	P	A
Farmers of North America	Consumer goods	Farming & fishing	Saskatoon	1998	Agriculture	P	A
Federated Co-operatives	Consumer goods	Farming & fishing	Saskatoon	1955	Agricultural co-op	P	A
FGL Sports	Consumer services	Specialty retailers	Calgary	1974	Sports retail, part of Canadian Tire	P	A
Fido Solutions	Telecommunications	Mobile telecommunications	Montreal	1996	Cellular provider	P	A
Finning	Industrials	Commercial vehicles & trucks	Edmonton	1933	Heavy equipment distributor	P	A
First Air	Consumer services	Airlines	Kanata	1946	Charter airline	P	A
First Majestic Silver	Basic materials	Platinum & precious metals	Vancouver	2002	Silver mining	P	A
First Nations Bank of Canada	Financials	Banks	Saskatoon	1996	Bank	P	A
First Quantum Minerals	Basic materials	Copper	Toronto	1983	Mining	P	A
Flickr	Technology	Internet	Vancouver	2004	Photo sharing website, part of Yahoo!	P	A
Force Four Entertainment	Consumer services	Broadcasting & entertainment	Vancouver	1983	TV/movie production	P	A
Ford Motor Company of Canada	Consumer goods	Automobiles	Oakville	1904	Part of Ford Motor Company	P	A
Fort Garry Brewing Company	Consumer goods	Brewers	Winnipeg	1930	Brewery	P	A
Fortis Inc.	Utilities	Conventional electricity	St. John's	1987	Utility holdings	P	A
FortisBC	Utilities	Multiutilities	Kelowna	1897	Power and gas distribution, part of Fortis Inc.	P	A
Four Seasons Hotels and Resorts	Consumer services	Hotels	Toronto	1961	Hotel chain	P	A
French Shoes	Consumer goods	Clothing & accessories	Montreal	1956	Footwear	P	D
Freedom Mobile	Telecommunications	Mobile telecommunications	Toronto	2009	Mobile network	P	A
FreshBooks	Technology	Software	Toronto	2003	Accounting software	P	A
Freshslice Pizza	Consumer services	Restaurants & bars	Burnaby	1999	Pizza chain	P	A
Ganz	Consumer goods	Toys	Woodbridge	1950	Toys, such as Webkinz	P	A
Garage	Consumer services	Apparel retailers	Montreal	1975	Clothing retailer, part of Groupe Dynamite	P	A
General Motors Canada	Consumer goods	Automobiles	Oshawa	1918	Automotive, part of General Motors (US)	P	A
George Weston Limited	Consumer goods	Food products	Toronto	1882	Food processing	P	A
Geosoft	Technology	Software	Toronto	1986	Geophysical software	P	A
Giant Tiger	Consumer services	Broadline retailer	Ottawa	1961	Discount store	P	A
Glacier Media	Consumer services	Publishing	Vancouver	1988	Newspaper publisher	P	A
Glentel	Consumer services	Specialty retailers	Burnaby	1963	Phone retailer, part of BCE Inc	P	A
Global Mechanic	Consumer services	Broadcasting & entertainment	Vancouver	2000	Animation studio	P	A
GlobeScan	Industrials	Business support services	Toronto	1987	Public opinion research	P	A
Gnowit	Consumer services	Software	Ottawa	2010	Monitoring software tool	P	A
Goldcorp	Basic materials	Gold mining	Vancouver	1994	Gold production	P	A
GoodLife Fitness	Consumer services	Recreational services	London	1979	Fitness centers	P	A
Great Western Brewing Company	Consumer goods	Brewers	Saskatoon	1927	Brewery	P	A
Groupe Dynamite	Consumer services	Apparel retailers	Montreal	1975	Clothing retailer	P	A
Guardian Biotechnologies	Health care	Biotechnology	Saskatoon	2002	Plant biotech	P	A
GuestLogix	Industrials	Transportation services	Toronto	2002	POS terminal used in-flight by airlines	P	A
Halogen Software	Technology	Software	Ottawa	1996	Talent management software	P	A
Harbour Publishing	Consumer services	Publishing	Pender Harbour	1974	Book publisher	P	A
Harlequin Enterprises	Consumer services	Publishing	Toronto	1949	Romance novels	P	A
Harry Rosen Inc	Consumer services	Apparel retailers	Toronto	1954	Clothing retail chain	P	A
Hart Stores	Consumer services	Broadline retailers	Laval	1960	Discount department stores	P	A
Harvey's	Consumer services	Restaurants & bars	Vaughan	1959	Fast food chain, part of Cara Operations	P	A
Hatch Ltd	Industrials	Business support services	Mississauga	1955	Industrial consulting and engineering	P	A
Hathor Exploration	Basic materials	General mining	Vancouver	1996	Uranium	P	A
Haywire Winery	Consumer goods	Distillers & vintners	Summerland	2009	Winery	P	A
						P	A
Héroux-Devtek	Industrials	Aerospace	Longueuil	1942	Aerospace components	P	A
Hidden Valley Highlands	Consumer services	Hotels	Huntsville	1971	Ski resort	P	A
HelpSeeker Technologies	Technology	Software	Calgary	2018	Software company	P	A
Home Hardware	Consumer services	Home improvement retailers	St. Jacobs	1964	Home improvement retailer	P	A
Honda Canada Inc.	Consumer goods	Automobiles	Markham	1986	Automotive, part of Honda (Japan)	P	A
HSBC Bank Canada	Financials	Banks	Vancouver	1981	Bank, part of HSBC (UK)	P	A
Hudbay	Basic materials	General mining	Toronto	1996	Mining in Manitoba	P	A
Hudson Boatworks	Consumer goods	Recreational products	London	1981	Rowing and racing boats	P	A
Hudson's Bay Company	Consumer services	Broadline retailers	Brampton	1670	Retail business group, founded in London, England, defunct 2025.	P	D
Husky Energy	Oil & gas	Integrated oil & gas	Calgary	1938	Oil and gas products	P	A
Hydro One	Utilities	Alternative electricity	Toronto	1999	Hydro-electric	S	A
Hydro-Québec	Utilities	Alternative electricity	Montreal	1944	Hydroelectric utilities	S	A
IGM Financial	Financials	Asset managers	Winnipeg	1926	Asset management	P	A
IL Therapeutics	Health care	Biotechnology	Saskatoon	2005	Bio-tech	P	A
IMAX Corporation	Consumer services	Recreational services	Mississauga	1968	IMAX cameras and technology	P	A
ImmersiVision	Consumer services	Broadcasting & entertainment	Whistler	2004	Immersive media	P	A
Imperial Oil	Oil & gas	Exploration & production	Calgary	1880	Oil and gas, part of ExxonMobil (US)	P	A
Indigo Books and Music	Consumer services	Specialty retailers	Toronto	1996	Bookseller	P	A
Information Services Corporation	Industrials	Business support services	Regina	2000	Registry development	P	A
Innovation Place Research Park	Financials	Real estate holding & development	Saskatoon	1980	Research parks	P	A
Intelligent Creatures	Consumer services	Broadcasting & entertainment	Toronto	2001	Visual effects post-production company	P	A
Inter Pipeline	Oil & gas	Pipelines	Calgary	1997	Pipelines	P	A
International Road Dynamics	Industrials	Transportation services	Saskatoon	1980	Traffic management systems	P	A
Intertape Polymer Group	Industrials	Containers & packaging	Montreal	1981	Packaging products	P	A
Investment Saskatchewan	Financials	Specialty finance	Regina	2003	Business investments	S	A
Ironclad Games	Technology	Software	Burnaby	2003	Video game developer	P	A
Irving Oil	Oil & gas	Exploration & production	Saint John	1924	Oil and gas	P	A
Island Timberlands	Basic materials	Forestry	Nanaimo	2005	Private timberland management	P	A
Jackson Grills	Consumer goods	Durable household products	Abbotsford	1999	Grill manufacture	P	A
Jazz	Consumer services	Airlines	Enfield	2001	Airlines operates as Air Canada Jazz	P	A
J.D. Irving	Conglomerates	-	Saint John	1882	Paper, tissues	P	A
Jean Coutu Group	Consumer services	Drug retailers	Varennes	1969	Pharmacies	P	A
Jim Pattison Group	Conglomerates	-	Vancouver	1961	Food products, media, automotive, packaging, financials	P	A
Joker's Closet	Consumer goods	Clothing & accessories	Toronto	2013	Fashion	P	A
K+S Windsor Salt	Basic materials	General mining	Pointe-Claire	1893	Salt mining, part of Morton Salt (US)	P	A
Kal Tire	Consumer goods	Tires	Vernon	1953	Tires	P	A
Katz Group of Companies	Consumer services	Drug retailers	Edmonton	1990	Drug stores	P	A
KF Aerospace	Industrials	Transportation services	Kelowna	1970	Airline support	P	A
KF Cargo	Industrials	Delivery services	Kelowna	1970	Cargo airline, part of KF Aerospace	P	A
Kinaxis	Technology	Software	Ottawa	1984	Supply chain management software	P	A
Kinross Gold	Basic materials	Gold mining	Toronto	1993	Gold mining	P	A
Kitchen Craft	Consumer goods	Furnishings	Winnipeg	1972	Cabinet manufacturing	P	A
KMS Tools	Consumer services	Specialty retailers	Coquitlam	1983	Tool retailer	P	A
Knowledge Network	Consumer services	Broadcasting & entertainment	Burnaby	1981	State-owned educational television network	S	A
Kobo Inc	Consumer services	Specialty retailers	Toronto	2009	Bookseller, part of Rakuten (Japan)	P	A
Koingo Software	Technology	Software	Kelowna	1994	Software development	P	A
Kootenay Direct Airlines	Consumer services	Airlines	Nelson	2006	Airline, defunct 2006	P	D
Kruger Inc	Basic materials	Paper	Montreal	1904	Paper, tissues	P	A
L'Oie de Cravan	Consumer services	Publishing	Montreal	1992	Publishing house	P	A
La Capitale	Financials	Full line insurance	Quebec City	1940	Merged with SSQ Insurance in 2022 to become Beneva	P	D
La Maison Simons	Consumer services	Apparel retailers	Quebec City	1840	Clothing retailer	P	A
Labatt Brewing Company	Consumer goods	Brewers	Toronto	1847	Brewery, part of Anheuser-Busch InBev (Belgium)	P	A
LASIK MD	Health care	Health care providers	Montreal	2001	Laser vision correction	P	A
Lassonde Industries	Consumer goods	Farming & fishing	Rougemont	1918	Agri-food	P	A
Laurentian Bank of Canada	Financials	Banks	Montreal	1846	Bank	P	A
Le Château	Consumer services	Apparel retailers	Montreal	1959	Clothing retailer	P	A
Lee Valley Tools	Consumer services	Home improvement retailers	Ottawa	1978	Home and garden retail	P	A
Léger Marketing	Industrials	Business support services	Montreal	1986	Polls and market research	P	A
Leon's	Consumer services	Specialty retailers	Toronto	1909	Home furnishing retailer	P	A
Linamar	Consumer goods	Auto parts	Guelph	1966	Auto part manufacturer	P	A
Lise Watier	Consumer goods	Personal products	Montreal	1972	Cosmetic brand	P	A
Livingston International	Industrials	Transportation services	Toronto	1945	Customs services	P	A
Loblaw Companies	Consumer services	Food retailers & wholesalers	Brampton	1919	Supermarkets	P	A
London Drugs	Consumer services	Drug retailers	Richmond	1945	Drugstore chain	P	A
London Life Insurance Company	Financials	Life insurance	London	1874	Life insurance, defunct 2020	P	D
Look Communications	Telecommunications	Mobile telecommunications	Milton	1997	Wireless ISP, defunct 2013	P	D
Lululemon Athletica	Consumer services	Apparel retailers	Vancouver	1998	Clothing retailer	P	A
LW Stores	Consumer services	Broadline retailer	Calgary	1986	Lost-cost retailer, defunct 2014	P	D
Lystek	Industrials	Waste & disposal services	Cambridge	2000	Waste management	P	A
MacDonald, Dettwiler and Associates	Industrials	Business support services	Vancouver	1969	Technology and engineering consulting	P	A
Mac's Convenience Stores	Consumer services	Food retailers & wholesalers	Richmond Hill	1961	Convenience stores, part of Alimentation Couche-Tard	P	A
Magna International	Consumer goods	Auto parts	Aurora	1957	Auto parts	P	A
Manitoba Hydro	Utilities	Alternative electricity	Winnipeg	1961	Power utility	S	A
Manitoba Liquor & Lotteries Corporation	Consumer services	Specialty retailers	Winnipeg	2013	Alcohol and gambling regulation and distribution	S	A
Manitoba Liquor Control Commission	Consumer services	Specialty retailers	Winnipeg	1923	Alcohol retailer, defunct 2013	P	D
Manitoba Lotteries Corporation	Consumer services	Gambling	Winnipeg	1993	Gambling regulation and operation, defunct 2013	P	D
Manitoba Public Insurance	Financials	Full line insurance	Winnipeg	1971	State insurance services	S	A
Manulife	Financials	Full line insurance	Toronto	1887	Insurance and financial services	P	A
Maple Leaf Foods	Consumer goods	Food products	Toronto	1927	Consumer packaged meats	P	A
Maple Leaf Sports & Entertainment	Consumer services	Broadcasting & entertainment	Toronto	1931	Owner of the Toronto Maple Leafs and Toronto Raptors	P	A
Maritime Life	Financials	Life insurance	Halifax	1922	Life insurance, merged into Manulife in 2004	P	D
Mark's	Consumer services	Apparel retailers	Calgary	1977	Clothing and footwear retailer	P	A
Mary Brown's	Consumer services	Restaurants & bars	Markham	1969	Fast food chain	P	A
Matrox	Technology	Computer hardware	Dorval	1976	Video cards	P	A
Maxim Power	Utilities	Conventional electricity	Calgary	1993	Power generation	P	A
McCain Foods	Consumer goods	Food products	Florenceville-Bristol	1957	Frozen potato products	P	A
McClelland & Stewart	Consumer services	Publishing	Toronto	1960	Book publishers	P	A
McDonald's Canada	Consumer services	Restaurants & bars	Toronto	1967	Canadian subsidiary of McDonald's (US)	P	A
Metal Supermarkets	Consumer services	Specialty retailers	Mississauga	1985	Metal retailer	P	A
Metro Inc	Consumer services	Food retailers & wholesalers	Montreal	1947	Supermarkets	P	A
Mitel	Telecommunications	Fixed line telecommunications	Ottawa	1973	Unified communications	P	A
MNP LLP	Professional Services	Accounting, Tax, Advisory	Brandon, Manitoba	1958	Services such as audit, tax, and advisory	P	A
Mobilicity	Telecommunications	Mobile telecommunications	Vaughan	2009	Mobile virtual networks, defunct 2016	P	D
Molson Brewery	Consumer goods	Brewers	Montreal	1786	Brewery	P	A
Montana's BBQ & Bar	Consumer services	Restaurants & bars	Vaughan	1993	Restaurant, part of Cara Operations	P	A
Moosehead Breweries	Consumer goods	Brewers	Saint John	1867	Brewery	P	A
Motor Coach Industries	Industrials	Commercial vehicles & trucks	Winnipeg	1933	Coach manufacturing, defunct 2015	P	D
Mozilla Messaging	Technology	Software	Vancouver	2007	Defunct 2011	P	D
Mr. Sub	Consumer services	Restaurants & bars	Toronto	1968	Fast food	P	A
National Bank of Canada	Financials	Banks	Montreal	1859	Commercial bank	P	A
Natura Market	Consumer goods	Food products	Mississauga, Ontario	2016	Diet food	P	A
Nature's Path	Consumer goods	Food products	Richmond	1985	Organic food	P	A
NCIX	Technology	Computer hardware	Richmond	1996	Computer hardware, defunct 2017	P	D
Nelvana	Consumer services	Broadcasting & entertainment	Toronto	1971	Entertainment	P	A
New Flyer Industries	Industrials	Commercial vehicles & trucks	Winnipeg	1930	Bus manufacture	P	A
New York Fries	Consumer services	Restaurants & bars	Brantford	1964	Fast food, part of Cara Operations	P	A
Nexen	Oil & gas	Exploration & production	Calgary	1971	Oil/gas	P	A
Nexient Learning	Industrials	Business training & employment agencies	Toronto	1980	Corporate training, defunct 2009	P	D
Nordion	Health care	Medical equipment	Ottawa	1946	Medical technology and products	P	A
Nortel	Telecommunications	Fixed line telecommunications	Mississauga	1895	Telecommunications, defunct 2013	P	D
North West Company	Consumer goods	Clothing & accessories	Montreal	1789	Fur trading, defunct 1821	P	D
Nova Chemicals	Basic materials	Specialty chemicals	Calgary	1954	Plastics and chemicals	P	A
Nova Scotia Power	Utilities	Conventional electricity	Halifax	1972	Power utility	P	A
Novacam Technologies	Industrials	Electronic equipment	Pointe-Claire	1997	OCT and profilometry	P	A
GoodMorning.com	Consumer goods	Durable household goods	Edmonton	2009	E-commerce bedding	P	A
Nuu-chah-nulth Economic Development Corporation	Financials	Specialty finance	Port Alberni	1984	Development financing	P	A
Ocean Productions	Consumer services	Broadcasting & entertainment	Vancouver	1994	Recording studio	P	A
Oland Brewery	Consumer goods	Brewers	Halifax	1867	Brewery	P	A
Omineca Cablevision	Telecommunications	Fixed line telecommunications	Vanderhoof	2004	Cable television and ISP	P	D
Onex Corporation	Financials	Investment services	Toronto	1983	Private equity and investments	P	A
Ontario Lottery and Gaming Corporation	Consumer services	Gambling	Sault Ste. Marie	1975	Lottery and casinos	S	A
OpenText	Technology	Software	Waterloo	1991	Software	P	A
Osisko Mining	Basic materials	Gold mining	Toronto	1982	Gold and silver mining	P	A
VersaBank	Financials	Banks	London	1980	Chartered bank	P	A
Pacific Coastal Airlines	Consumer services	Airlines	Richmond	1987	Airline	P	A
Packers Plus Energy Services	Oil & gas	Exploration & production	Calgary	2000	Oil and gas	P	A
PainCeptor Pharma	Health care	Pharmaceuticals	Montreal	2004	Pain medication	P	A
Palliser Furniture	Consumer goods	Furnishings	Winnipeg	1944	Furniture manufacturing	P	A
Pan American Silver	Basic materials	General mining	Vancouver	1994	Mining	P	A
Panago	Consumer services	Restaurants & bars	Abbotsford	1986	Pizza chain	P	A
Paramount Resources	Oil & gas	Exploration & production	Calgary	1978	Petroleum exploration and development	P	A
Parmalat Canada	Consumer goods	Food products	Toronto	1997	Dairy, part of Parmalat (Italy)	P	A
Parrish & Heimbecker	Consumer goods	Food products	Winnipeg	1909	Grains	P	A
Pascan Aviation	Consumer services	Airlines	Saint-Hubert	1999	Airline	P	A
Paterson GlobalFoods	Consumer goods	Farming & fishing	Winnipeg	1908	Agri-business	P	A
Persona Communications	Telecommunications	Fixed line telecommunications	Edmonton	1986	Cable, now part of Eastlink	P	D
Petcetera	Consumer services	Speciality retailers	Richmond	1997	Pet stores	P	D
Petro-Canada	Oil & gas	Integrated oil & gas	Calgary	1975	Retail gasoline chain and refiner, owned by Suncor Energy	P	A
Pharmasave	Consumer services	Drug retailers	Langley	1981	Pharmacy chain	P	A
Pharmascience	Health care	Pharmaceuticals	Montreal	1983	Pharmaceuticals	P	A
Pizza Nova	Consumer services	Restaurants & bars	Toronto	1963	Pizza chain	P	A
Pizza Pizza	Consumer services	Restaurants & bars	Toronto	1967	Pizza chain	P	A
Pollard Banknote	Industrials	Business support services	Winnipeg	1907	Printing	P	A
Porter Airlines	Consumer services	Airlines	Toronto	2006	Regional airline	P	A
PotashCorp	Basic materials	General mining	Saskatoon	1975	Potash mining, defunct 2018	P	D
Power Corporation of Canada	Conglomerate	-	Montreal	1925	Financials, energy, media	P	A
CanniMed	Health care	Pharmaceuticals	Saskatoon	1988	Pharmaceuticals	P	A
Pratt & Whitney Canada	Industrials	Aerospace	Longueuil	1928	Aerospace	P	A
Precision Drilling	Oil & gas	Oil equipment & services	Calgary	1969	Oil well services	P	A
Premium Brands Holdings Corporation	Consumer goods	Food products	Richmond	1917	Food products and distribution	P	A
Prevost	Industrials	Commercial vehicles & trucks	Sainte-Claire	1924	Bus manufacturer wholly owned by Volvo AB	P	A
Priszm	Consumer services	Restaurants & bars	Vaughan	2003	Restaurant holdings	P	A
Pronto Airways	Consumer services	Airlines	Saskatoon	2006	Airline, defunct 2015	P	D
Protecode	Technology	Software	Kanata	2006	Open source and security software	P	A
PsyMontréal	Health Care	Training services	Montreal	-	Psychology services	P	A
Pultronics	Technology	Semiconductors	Montreal	1994	Semiconductors and software	P	A
Purolator Courier	Industrials	Delivery services	Mississauga	1960	Point to point package delivery, owned by Canada Post	P	A
Quebecor	Industrials	Business support services	Montreal	1965	Printing and media	P	A
Quester Tangent Corporation	Technology	Software	Saanichton	1983	Train electronics, software and hardware	P	A
Recipe Unlimited	Consumer services	Restaurants & bars	Vaughan	1883	Restaurants and food services	P	A
Red Back Mining	Basic materials	Gold mining	Vancouver	1988	Gold	P	A
Red Barrels	Technology	Software	Chambly	2011	Game developer	P	A
Regional Maple Leaf Communications	Consumer services	Publishing	Edmonton	1977	Publisher	P	A
Reimer Express Lines	Industrials	Trucking	Winnipeg	1952	Trucking and transportation, defunct 2019	P	D
Resolute Forest Products	Basic materials	Paper	Montreal	2007	Pulp and paper	P	A
Rhino Media Group	Consumer services	Publishing	Montreal	2005	Advertising	P	A
Richardson International	Consumer goods	Food products	Winnipeg	1857	Food and agriculture	P	A
Rockstar Toronto	Technology	Software	Oakville	1988	Game developer, part of Rockstar Games (US)	P	A
Rockstar Vancouver	Technology	Software	Vancouver	1998	Game developer, part of Rockstar Games (US), defunct 2012	P	D
Rogers Communications	Telecommunications	Fixed line telecommunications	Toronto	1960	Telecom	P	A
Rona	Consumer services	Home improvement retailers	Boucherville	1939	Home improvement chain	P	A
Roots Canada	Consumer services	Apparel retailers	Toronto	1973	Clothing retail chain	P	A
Royal Bank of Canada	Financials	Banks	Toronto	1864	Bank	P	A
Royal LePage	Financials	Real estate services	Toronto	1913	Real estate firm	P	A
Samuel, Son & Co.	Consumer services	Specialty retailers	Oakville	1855	Metal processing and distribution	P	A
Sandman Hotels	Consumer services	Hotels	Vancouver	1967	Hotel chain	P	A
Sandvine	Technology	Telecommunications equipment	Waterloo	2001	Networking equipment	P	A
Saputo Inc	Consumer goods	Food products	Montreal	1954	Dairy products	P	A
Saskatchewan Government Insurance	Financials	Full line insurance	Regina	1945	Insurance, crown corporation	S	A
Saskatchewan Minerals	Basic materials	General mining	Chaplin	1947	Sodium sulphate mining	P	A
SRC	Industrials	Business support services	Saskatoon	1947	Research	S	A
SaskPower	Utilities	Conventional electricity	Regina	1929	Electricity	S	A
SaskTel	Telecommunications	Fixed line telecommunications	Regina	1908	Telecom	S	A
Save-On-Foods	Consumer services	Food retailers & wholesalers	Langley	1982	Supermarket chain	P	A
Scotiabank	Financials	Banks	Toronto	1832	Bank of Nova Scotia	P	A
Sears Canada	Consumer services	Broadline retailer	Toronto	1952	Retail Chain, defunct January 14, 2018	P	D
Second Cup	Consumer services	Restaurants & bars	Mississauga	1975	Coffee chain	P	A
Sepro Mineral Systems	Industrials	Diversified industrials	Langley	1987	Mining equipment and processes	P	A
Servus Credit Union	Financials	Banks	Edmonton	1938	Credit union	P	A
Shaftebury Brewing Company	Consumer goods	Brewers	Vancouver	1986	Brewery	P	A
Shaw Communications	Telecommunications	Fixed line telecommunications	Calgary	1966	Telecom and ISP	P	D
Shell Canada	Oil & gas	Exploration & production	Montreal	1911	Petrochemicals, part of Royal Dutch Shell (Netherlands)	P	A
Shopify	Technology	Software	Ottawa	2004	eCommerce software	P	A
Shoppers Drug Mart	Consumer services	Drug retailers	Toronto	1962	Drug store chain	P	A
Shore Tilbe Irwin + Partners	Industrials	Business support services	Toronto	1945	Architecture firm	P	A
Siemens Transportation Group	Industrials	Trucking	Saskatoon	1962	Trucking and transport	P	A
Sierra Wireless	Telecommunications	Mobile telecommunications	Richmond	1993	Wireless provider	P	A
Sifto Canada	Basic materials	General mining	Mississauga	1866	Salt	P	A
SiriusXM Canada	Consumer services	Broadcasting & entertainment	Toronto	2011	Satellite radio, part of Sirius XM Holdings (US)	P	A
Sleeman Breweries	Consumer goods	Brewers	Guelph	1834	Brewery	P	A
Sleep Country Canada	Consumer goods	Durable household products	Toronto	1994	Mattresses	P	A
Smart Technologies	Consumer goods	Consumer electronics	Calgary	1987	Interactive displays and whiteboards	P	A
Sobeys	Consumer services	Food retailers & wholesalers	Stellarton	1907	Food retail chains, part of Empire Company	P	A
Soquelec	Industrials	Electronic equipment	Montreal	1974	Scientific equipment, supplies and service	P	A
Splashdot	Technology	Internet	Vancouver	2000	Online loyalty programs and interactive promotions	P	A
St Hubertus & Oak Bay Estate Winery	Consumer goods	Distillers & vintners	Kelowna	1928	Winery	P	A
Stanfield's	Consumer goods	Clothing & accessories	Truro	1856	Garment manufacturer	P	A
Stelco	Basic materials	Iron & steel	Hamilton	1910	Steel mill	P	A
Stellantis Canada	Consumer goods	Automobiles	Windsor	1925	Part of Stellantis North America (US)	P	A
Sun Life Financial	Financials	Life insurance	Toronto	1865	Life and other financial services	P	A
Suncor Energy	Oil & gas	Integrated oil & gas	Calgary	1919	Energy	P	A
Sun-Rype	Consumer goods	Food products	Kelowna	1946	Fruit-based food and beverage	P	A
Sunward Aerospace Group	Consumer goods	Recreational products	Toronto	2000	Model rockets and hobbies	P	A
Swiss Chalet	Consumer services	Restaurants & bars	Toronto	1954	Restaurant chain, part of Cara Operations	P	A
Lucidea	Technology	Software	Richmond	1989	Library management software	P	A
Syncrude	Oil & gas	Exploration & production	Fort McMurray	1964	Oil production	P	A
Synex International	Utilities	Conventional electricity	Vancouver	1982	Power generation	P	A
T & T Supermarket	Consumer services	Food retailers & wholesalers	Richmond	1993	Supermarket chain, part of Loblaw Companies	P	A
Tahera	Basic materials	General mining	Toronto	1999	Diamond mining company	P	A
Talentvision	Consumer services	Broadcasting & entertainment	Richmond	1993	Mandarin television, part of Fairchild Group	P	A
Talisman Energy	Oil & gas	Exploration & production	Calgary	1923	Exploration, now part of Repsol (Spain)	P	D
Tamarack Developments Corporation	Consumer goods	Home construction	Ottawa	1948	Residential projects	P	A
Taseko Mines	Basic materials	General mining	Vancouver	1999	Copper mining	P	A
TC Energy	Oil & gas	Pipelines	Calgary	1951	Pipelines and infrastructure	P	A
Teck Resources	Basic materials	General mining	Vancouver	1906	Metals and mining	P	A
Teledyne DALSA	Industrials	Electronic equipment	Waterloo	1980	Electronic imaging components	P	A
Telesat	Telecommunications	Fixed line telecommunications	Ottawa	1969	Satellite telecom	P	A
Telus	Telecommunications	Fixed line telecommunications	Vancouver	1990	Telecom	P	A
Tembec	Basic materials	Paper	Montreal	1973	Paper products, sold to Rayonier Advanced Materials in 2017	P	D
Tetra Tech	Industrials	Business support services	Toronto	1955	Engineering consulting, defunct 2009	P	D
The Bargain! Shop	Consumer services	Broadline retailers	Mississauga	1991	Discount chain	P	A
The Brick	Consumer services	Specialty retailers	Edmonton	1971	Furnishing retailer	P	A
The Embassy Visual Effects	Consumer services	Broadcasting & entertainment	Vancouver	2002	Movie special effects	P	A
The Globe and Mail	Consumer services	Publishing	Toronto	1844	Daily newspaper	P	A
The Insurance Company of Prince Edward Island	Financials	Full line insurance	Charlottetown	1987	Insurance	P	A
The Source	Consumer services	Specialty retailers	Barrie	1986	Consumer electronics retail chain, defunct in 2024	P	D
Timothy's World Coffee	Consumer services	Restaurants & bars	Toronto	1975	Coffee chain	P	A
Dana TM4	Utilities	Alternative electricity	Boucherville	1998	Electrodynamic systems, part of Hydro-Québec	P	A
TMX Group	Financials	Investment services	Toronto	2008	Financial services	P	A
Tolko	Basic materials	Forestry	Vernon	1956	Forestry	P	A
Toronto Stock Exchange	Financials	Investment services	Toronto	1861	Stock exchange	P	A
Toronto-Dominion Bank	Financials	Banks	Toronto	1955	Bank	P	A
Torstar	Consumer services	Publishing	Toronto	1958	Publishing and media	P	A
TransAlta	Utilities	Conventional electricity	Calgary	1911	Power generator	P	A
TransGas	Oil & gas	Pipelines	Regina	1988	Pipelines, part of SaskEnergy	P	A
Transwest Air	Consumer services	Airlines	Prince Albert	2000	Merged with West Wind Aviation in 2021 and renamed Rise Air	P	D
Treehouse TV	Consumer services	Broadcasting & entertainment	Toronto	1997	Television channel, part of Corus Entertainment and YTV	P	A
Tridel	Industrials	Heavy construction	Toronto	1934	Construction	P	A
Triple Five Group	Financials	Real estate holding & development	Edmonton	1965	Malls and development	P	A
Ubisoft Montreal	Technology	Software	Montreal	1997	Video games, part of Ubisoft (France)	P	A
Ubisoft Toronto	Technology	Software	Toronto	2010	Video games, part of Ubisoft (France)	P	A
Ultramar	Oil & gas	Integrated oil & gas	Montreal	1961	Marketers and refiners of petroleum	P	A
Umbra	Consumer goods	Specialty retailers	Toronto	1979	Home accessories design and manufacturing company	P	A
United Furniture Warehouse	Consumer services	Specialty retailers	Edmonton	1981	Furniture retailer, defunct 2017	P	D
Vachon Bakery	Consumer goods	Food products	Sainte-Marie, Quebec	1923	Pastries, part of Grupo Bimbo (Mexico)	P	A
Vancity	Financials	Banks	Vancouver	1946	Vancouver City Savings Credit Union, banking	P	A
Vancity Community Investment Bank	Financials	Banks	Vancouver	1997	Banking, part of Vancity	P	A
Via Rail	Consumer services	Travel & tourism	Montreal	1977	Government-owned passenger train service	S	A
Vidéotron	Telecommunications	Fixed line telecommunications	Montreal	1964	Telecommunications	P	A
Vista Broadcast Group	Consumer services	Broadcasting & entertainment	Courtenay	2004	Radio broadcast	P	A
Vortex Aquatic Structures International	Industrials	Construction & Materials	Montreal	1995	Commercial recreational construction	P	A
Waterloo Maple	Technology	Software	Waterloo	1988	Mathematical software	P	A
Wawanesa Insurance	Financials	Full line insurance	Winnipeg	1896	Insurance	P	A
West Fraser Timber	Basic materials	Forestry	Quesnel	1955	Wood products	P	A
West Wind Aviation	Consumer services	Airlines	Saskatoon	1983	Merged with Transwest Airlines in 2021 to and renamed Rise Air	P	D
WestJet	Consumer services	Airlines	Calgary	1996	Low-cost airline	P	A
WingTips Airport Services	Industrials	Transportation services	Calgary	1990	Ground handling, defunct 2010	P	D
Winners	Consumer services	Broadline retailers	Mississauga	1982	Discount chain, part of TJX Companies (US)	P	A
Yara Belle Plaine	Basic materials	Commodity chemicals	Regina	1984	Fertilizers	P	A
Yogen Früz	Consumer services	Restaurants & bars	Thornhill	1986	Yogurt chain	P	A
Z8Games	Technology	Software	Toronto	2009	Gaming portal	P	A
Zag Bank	Financials	Banks	Calgary	2002	Bank, defunct 2019	P	D
Zellers	Consumer services	Broadline retailer	Brampton	1931	Acquired by Target Canada	P	D
ZENN Motor Company	Consumer goods	Automobiles	Montreal	2000	Electric vehicles, defunct 2015	P	D

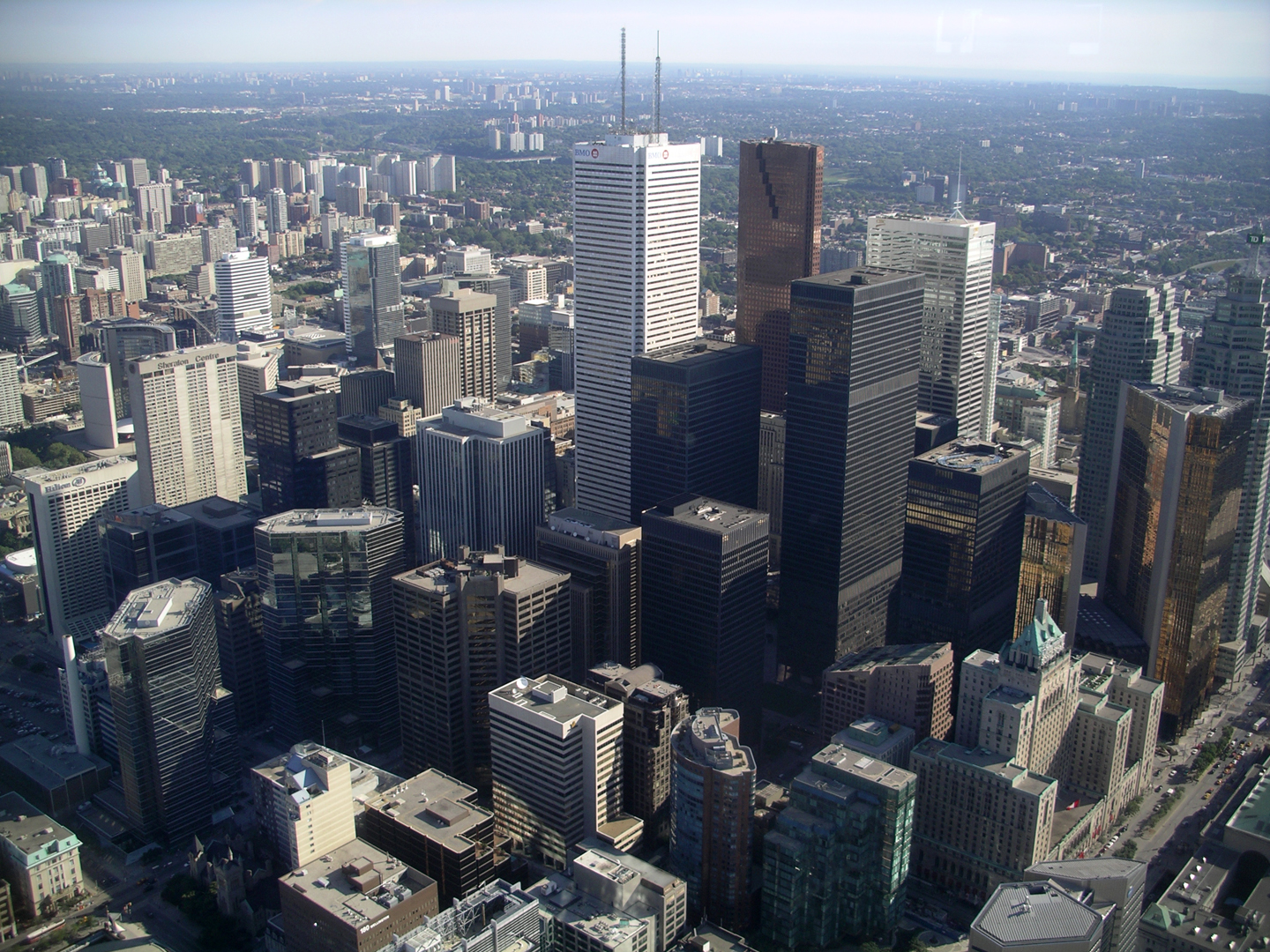
Central business district in Toronto.

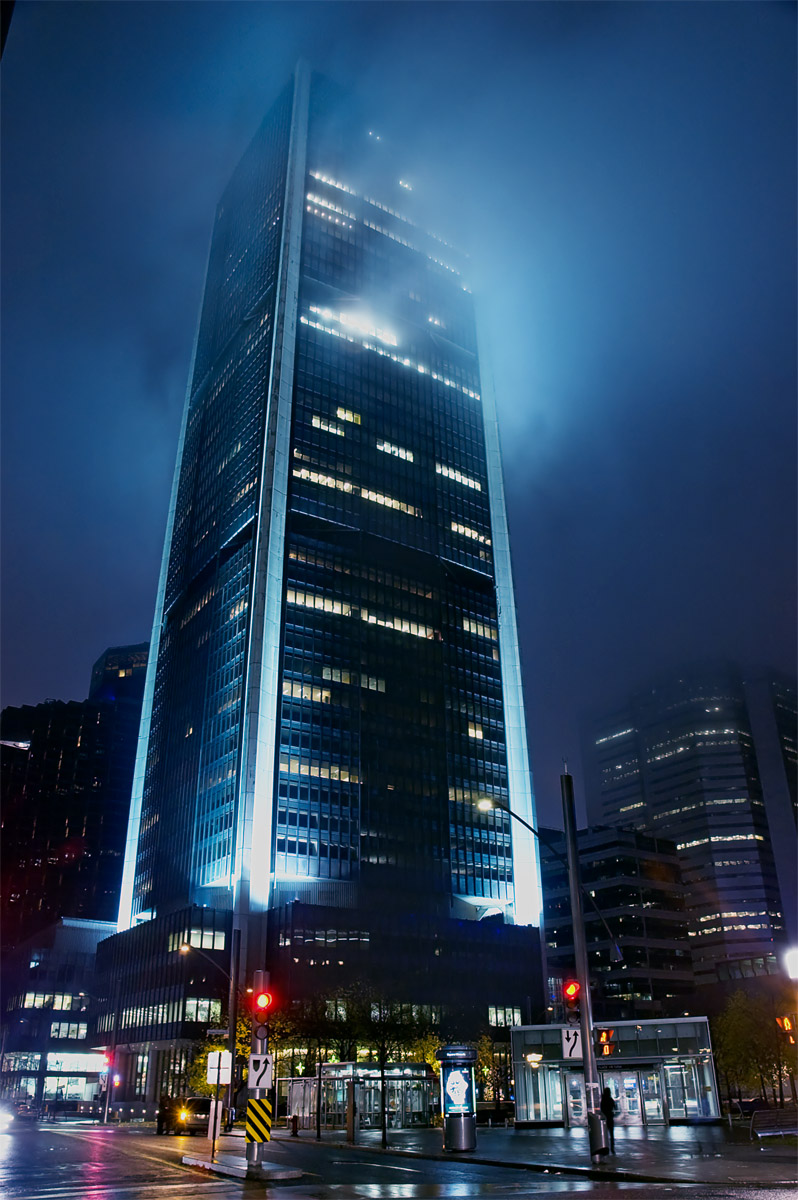
Tour de la Bourse home to the Montreal Exchange.

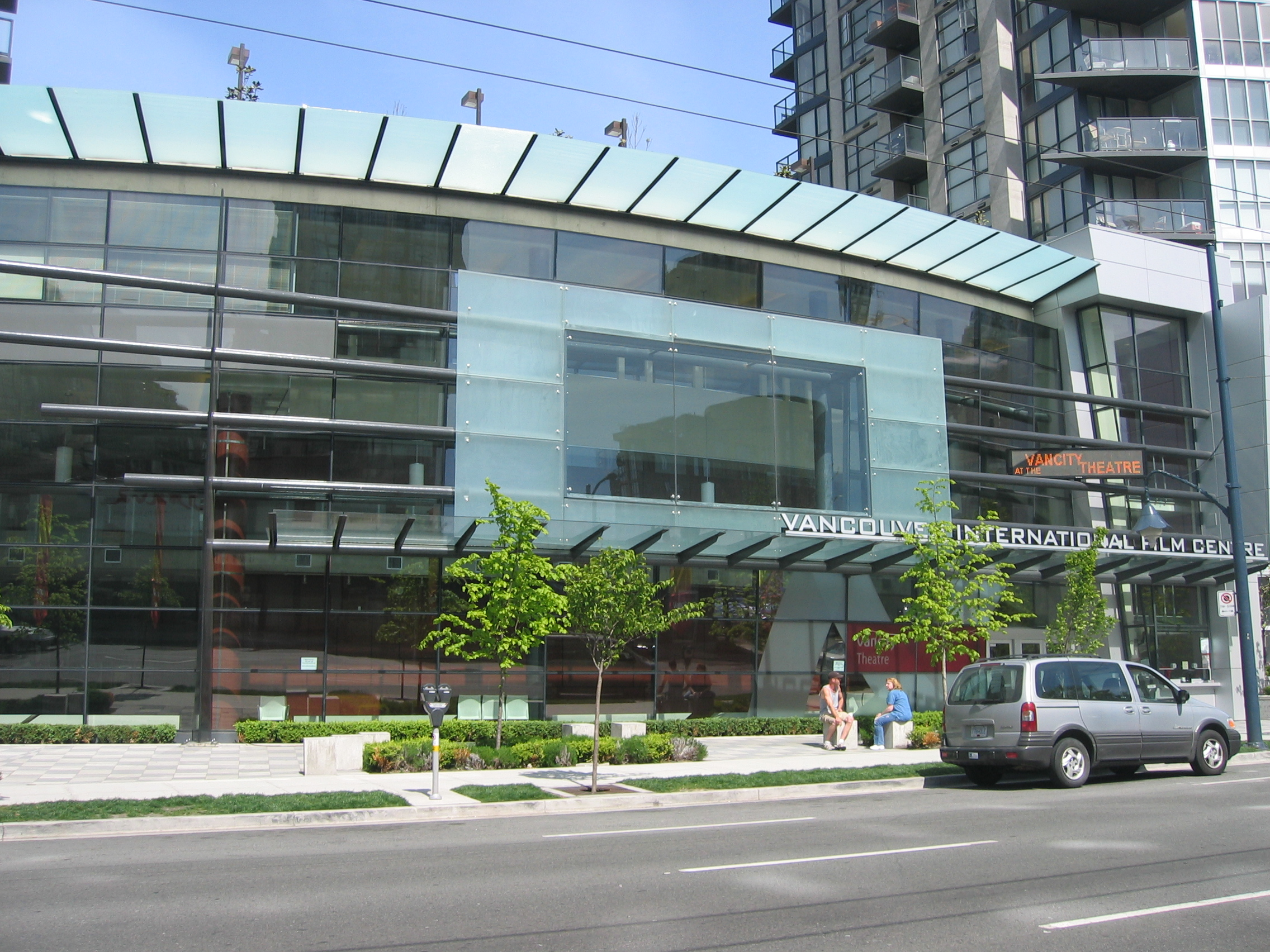
VIFF Centre

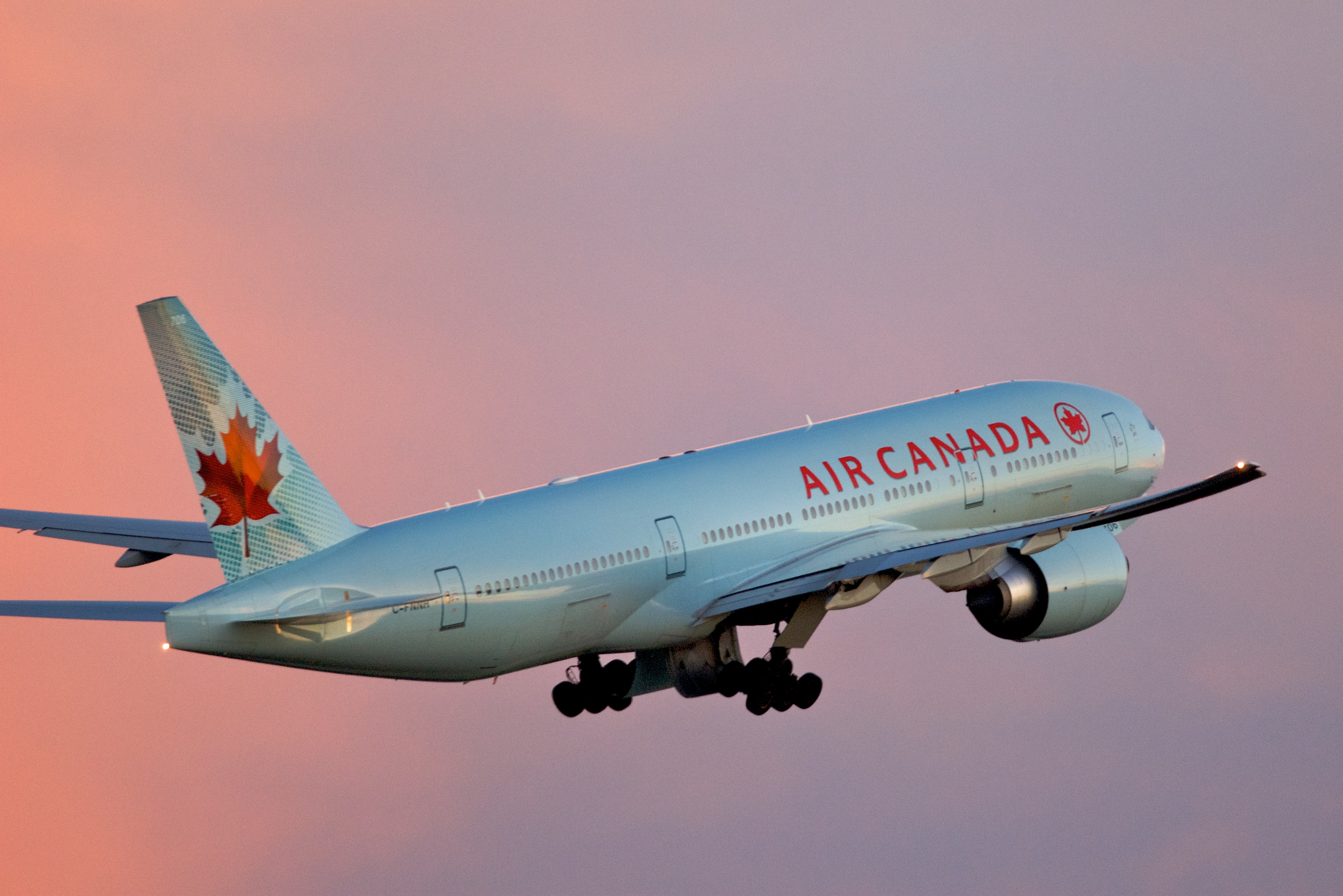
Air Canada Boeing 777 in Toronto.

== See also ==
- List of largest companies in Canada
- List of largest public companies in Canada by profit
- List of Canadian mobile phone companies
- List of Canadian telephone companies
- List of defunct Canadian companies
- List of government-owned companies
