= Atwill-Morin =

- Type: Public
- Founded: 2007
- Headquarters: Montreal, Quebec, Canada
- Key people: Matthew Morin (Chairman)
- Products: Masonry Services, Project Management, Construction, Construction Management
- Website: www.atwill-morin.com

Atwill-Morin is a Canadian company specializing in masonry restoration and heritage preservation. The business was founded in April 2007 by the three Atwill-Morin brothers.

== Accomplishments ==
1. Canada Parliament - Ottawa, Ontario
2. The Linton Appartements - Montréal, Québec
3. M sur la Montragne Luxury Condominium - Montréal, Québec
4. The Maison du Citoyen - Gatineau, Québec
5. Outremont Theater - Montréal, Québec
