= The Insurance Company of Prince Edward Island =

- Type: Private
- Industry: Insurance
- Founded: 1987
- Headquarters: Charlottetown, Prince Edward Island
- Website: https://icpei.ca/

The Insurance Company of Prince Edward Island, was established by Charlie Cooke in 1987 in Prince Edward Island. In 2001, SGI purchased a 75% share of the insurance company at a cost of $2.7 million Canadian from CGU Group with the remaining shares being owned by the Cooke family. The company provides a full line of automobile, home and commercial insurance in the Canadian provinces of Prince Edward Island, New Brunswick, and Nova Scotia.
