= ABS Friction =

Canadian brake manufacturer

ABS Friction Inc.
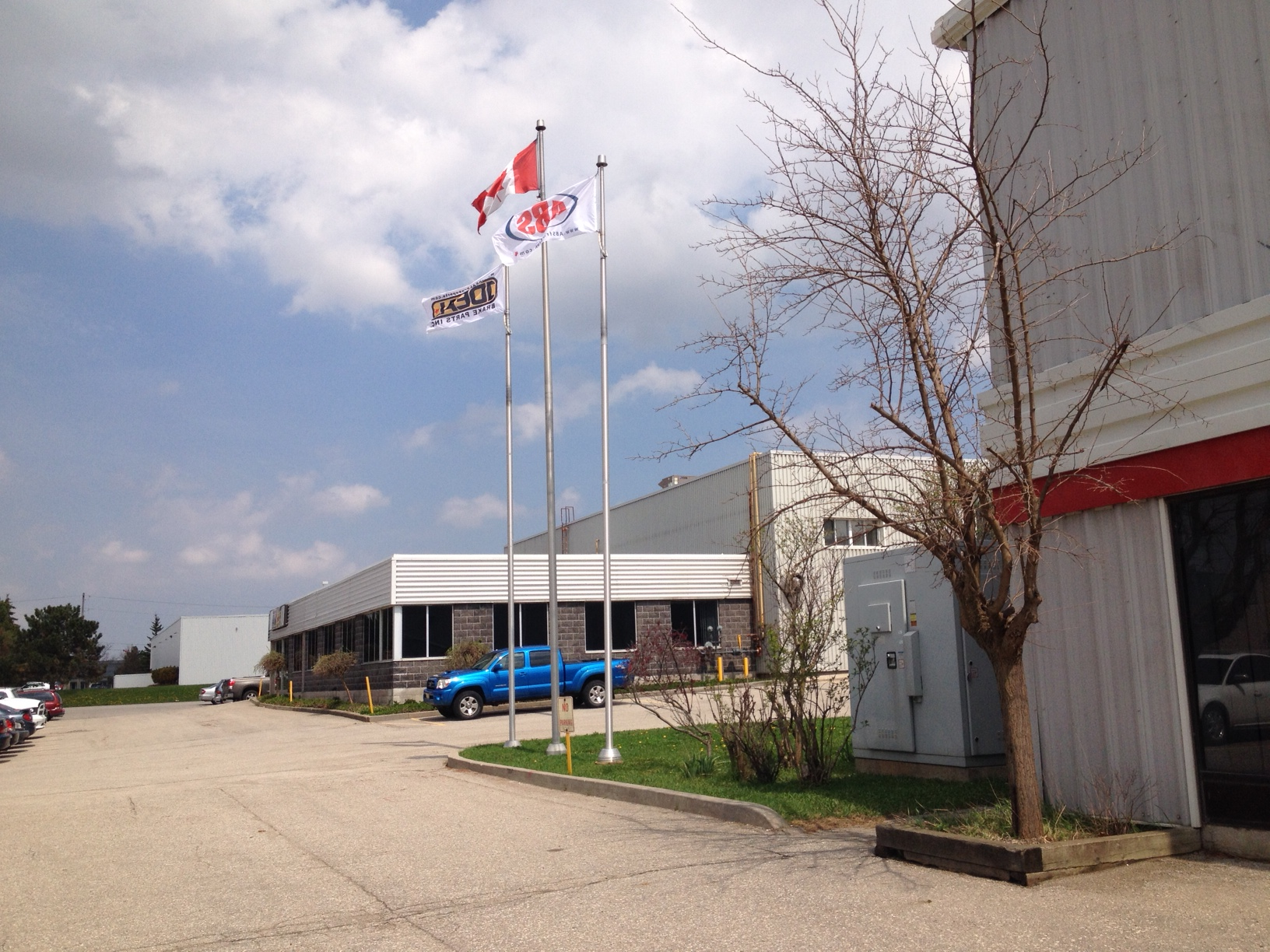
- ABS Friction plant
- Company type: Private
- Industry: Auto parts
- Founded: 1995
- Headquarters: Guelph, Ontario, Canada
- Products: Brakes
- Website: www.absfriction.com

ABS Friction is a Canadian brake manufacturer. Headquartered in Guelph, Ontario, Canada, ABS Friction Inc. produces aftermarket brake pads for more than 1 700 types of vehicles in 27 countries. Originally a private label company, ABS launched their own brand, IDEAL Brake Parts Inc., in 2009.

ABS Friction Inc. was founded in 1995 by Rick Jamieson, Joe Schmidt, and Ralph Neil.
