= Sunward Aerospace Group =

Sunward Aerospace Group Limited
- Company type: Private
- Industry: Hobbies, Model rocketry
- Founded: 2000
- Headquarters: Toronto, Ontario, Canada
- Website: www.sunward1.com, www.sunwardhobbies.ca

Sunward Aerospace is the short name of an incorporated company started in early 2000 producing a line of model rockets. Originally called Sunward Model Aerospace, the name is now Sunward Aerospace Group Limited. The company is located in Toronto, Ontario, Canada.

The company switched owners in October 2004 and since expanded the line of model rockets including general rockets, payload, and pyramid rockets. Sunward Aerospace also produces a line of wood kits which include a trebuchet, a catapult, a ballista and an elastic powered racer.

The company introduced additions to the line of model rockets in April 2007 and also added a paper telescope kit for the school market.

In July 2013, the company expanded Canadian operations by opening a retail hobby store in Toronto serving the Canadian market.
