= Investment Saskatchewan =

Agency in Canada

Investment Saskatchewan Inc.
- Company type: Crown Corporation
- Industry: Financial
- Headquarters: Regina, Saskatchewan, Canada
- Products: Venture Capital
- Website: web.archive.org/web/20080705053027/

Investment Saskatchewan Inc. is a Crown corporation owned by the Government of Saskatchewan that invests in Saskatchewan companies. The company was established in 2003. Investments are a minimum of C$3 million. The investments were managed through a private sector venture capital investment company called Victoria Park Capital Inc. until 2009. Since then the Saskatchewan Government is responsible for the investments of the company.
