= Kitchen Craft =

Canadian cabinet manufacturer

- Company type: Subsidiary
- Industry: Cabinet manufacturing
- Founded: 1972
- Headquarters: Winnipeg, Manitoba, Canada
- Products: Cabinets
- Services: Cabinetwork
- Owner: MasterBrand Cabinets
- Website: https://www.kitchencraft.com/

Kitchen Craft is a Canadian company that manufactures cabinetwork for kitchens and bathrooms.

Established in 1972 and headquartered in Winnipeg, Manitoba, Canada, the company employs approximately 1300 people in Winnipeg alone, making it one of the largest employers in the city. Kitchen Craft retail showrooms are located in Winnipeg, Edmonton, and Regina.

In 2002, the company became a subsidiary of the MasterBrand Cabinets, a division of Fortune Brands in the United States.
