= St Hubertus & Oak Bay Estate Winery =

Coordinates: 49.796428°N 119.532765°W

St Hubertus & Oak Bay Estate Winery is a Canadian wine grower and producer. It is in Kelowna, British Columbia, in the Okanagan Valley wine region.

== History ==
Scenes of St Hubertus Estate Winery

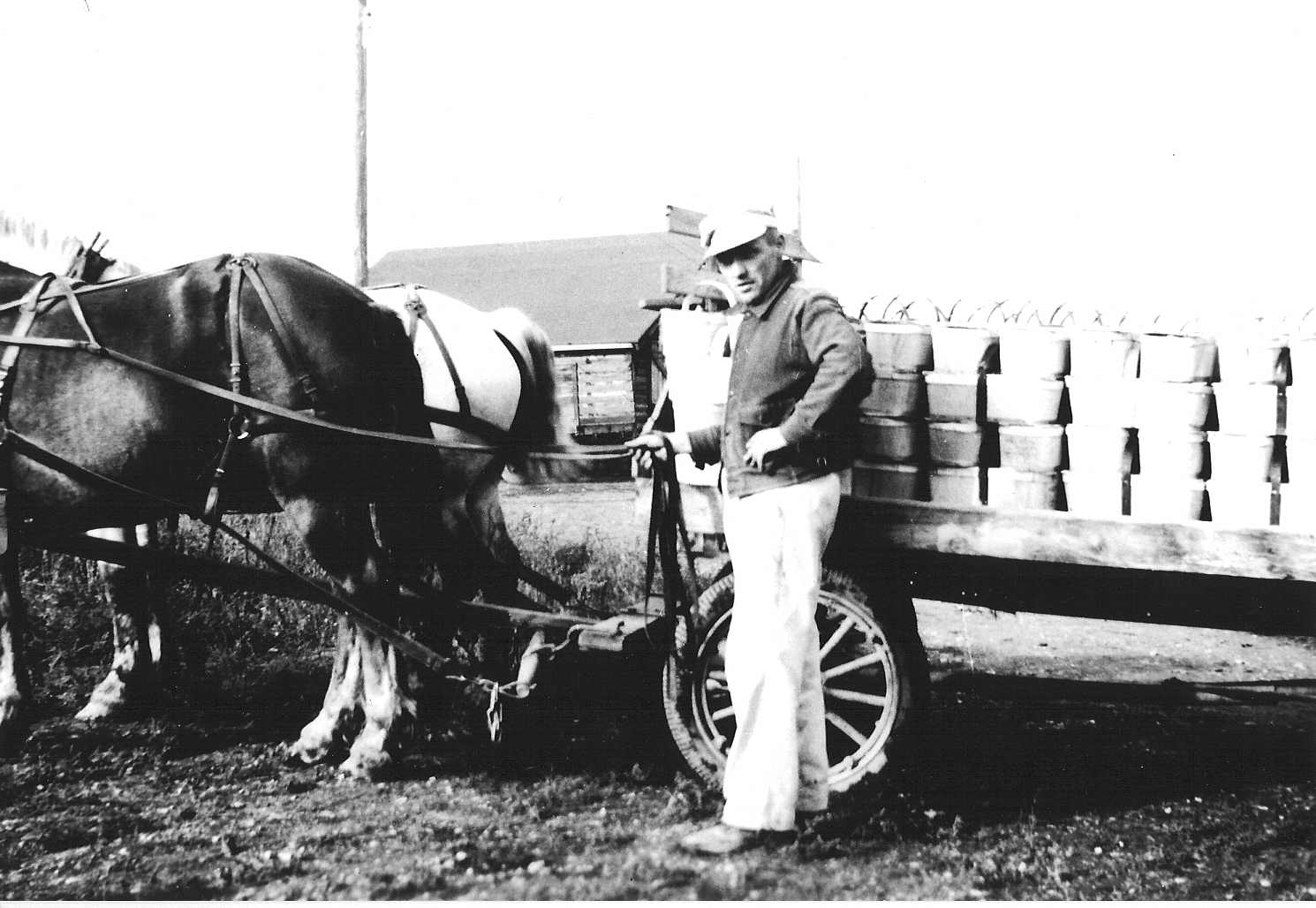
J.W Hughes

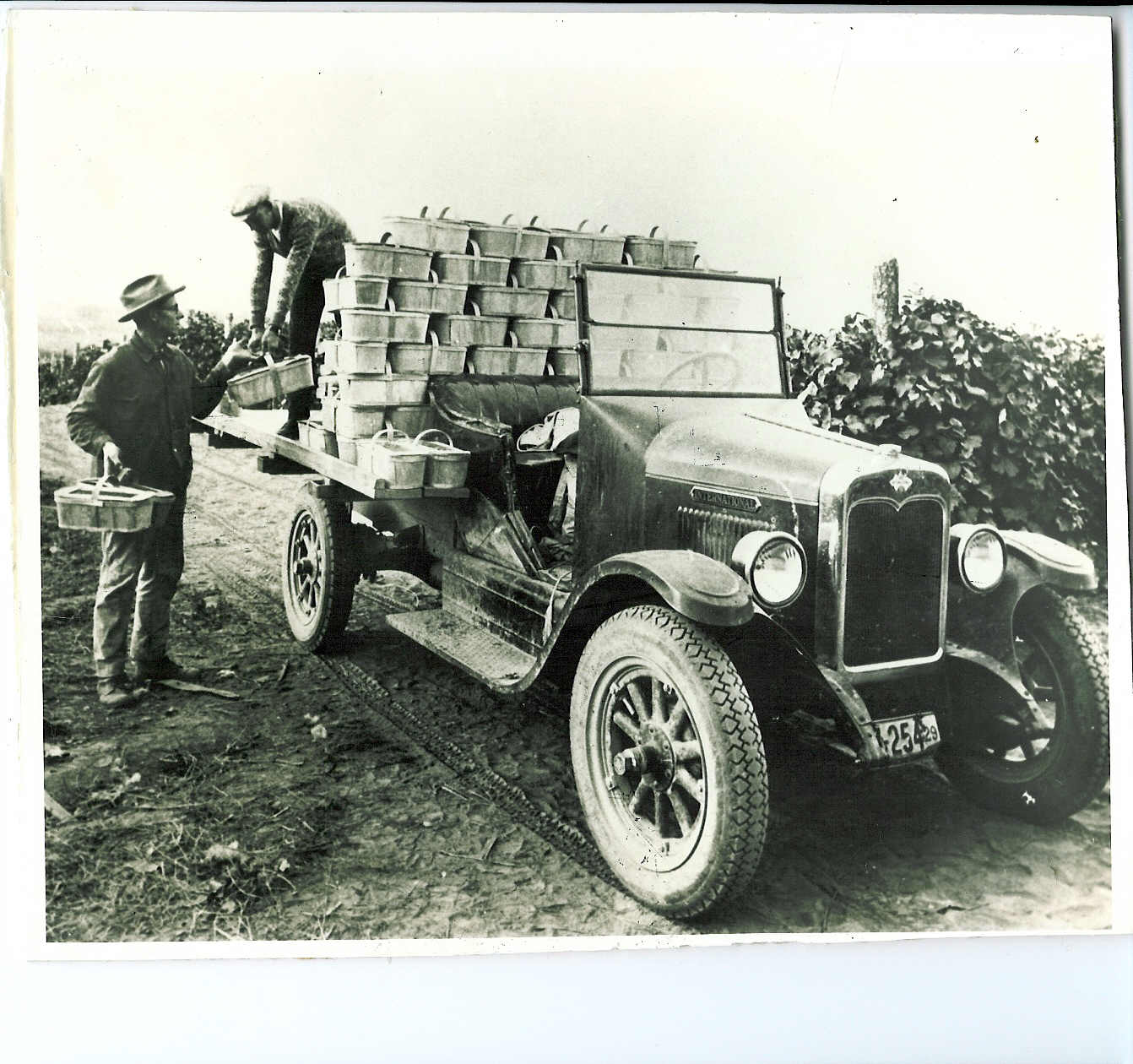
During Harvest

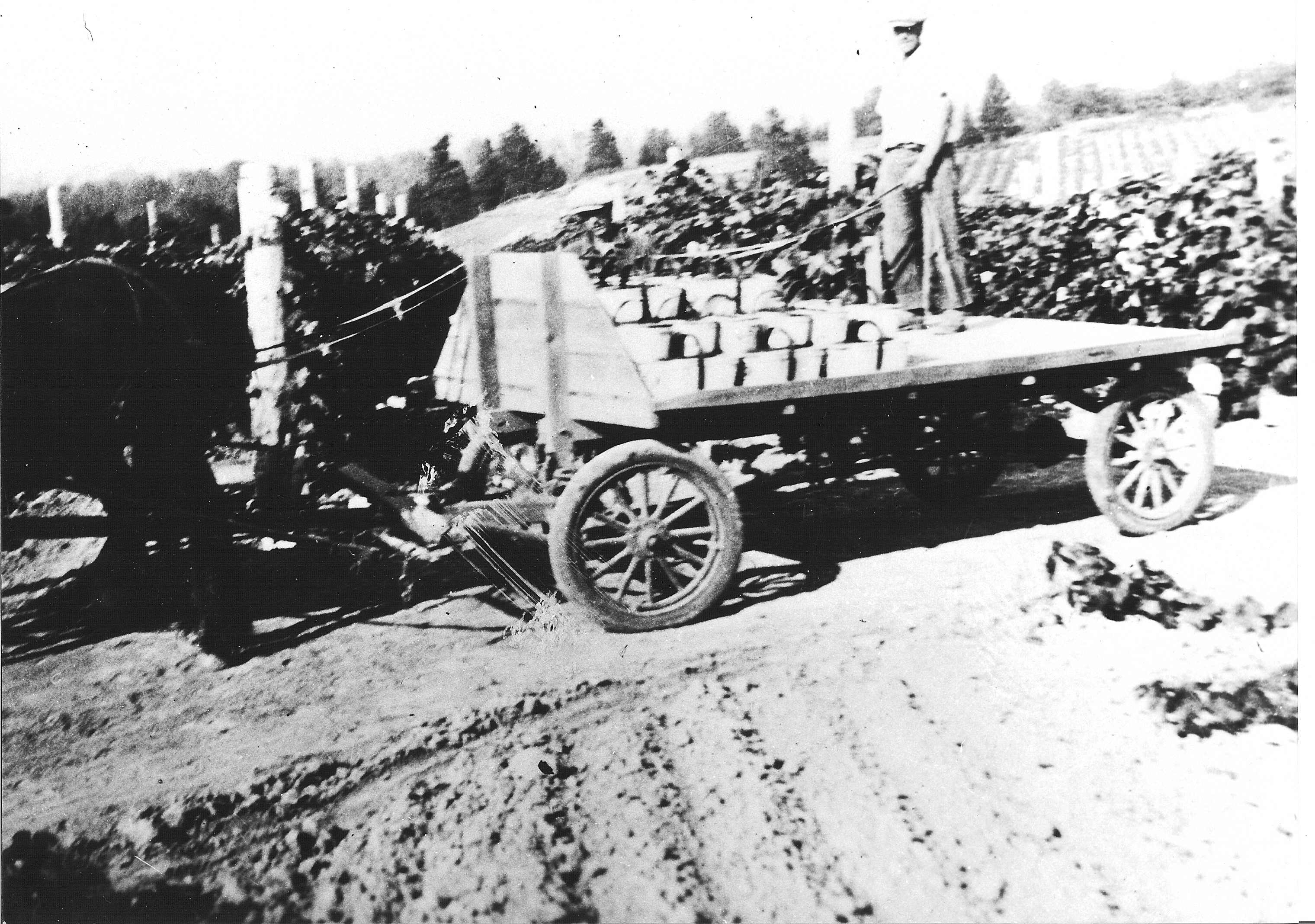
Grape harvest with horse & wagon

The St Hubertus & Oak Bay Vineyards were originally planted in 1928 by J.W. Hughes during a time when good agricultural land was plentiful. The vineyards of St Hubertus and Oak Bay are some of the oldest in the Okanagan Valley.

In 1984 Leo Gebert, originally from Switzerland, came to the Okanagan to start a winery. Two years later his younger brother Andy joined him. Since 1984 the Gebert Family uses sustainable farming practices on their 76-acre vineyard to produce wines that reflects the terroir of the north Okanagan Valley under the St Hubertus (50 acres) & Oak Bay (26 acres) Label. This was officially recognized in 2005 through the Environmental Farm Plan. In 1991 the two brothers Leo and Andy Gebert changed direction and started producing their own wines. Today the winery produces on average 14'000 cases of wine annually. All wines created by St Hubertus and Oak Bay are made with estate grown grapes and crafted and bottled on site; in keeping with the traditions of an estate winery.

In the summer of 2003 the Okanagan Mountain Park Fire, destroyed the original winery and over 200 homes in the surrounding area.

== Vineyards ==
St Hubertus Estate Winery includes two vineyards, those of St Hubertus Vineyard and Oak Bay Vineyard. Wines aged in stainless steel tanks are bottle under the St Hubertus label while those aged in French and American oak barrels are bottled under the Oak Bay label. The vineyards are located beside one another along Okanagan Lake in Kelowna, British Columbia.

Scenes from present day St Hubertus Estate Winery

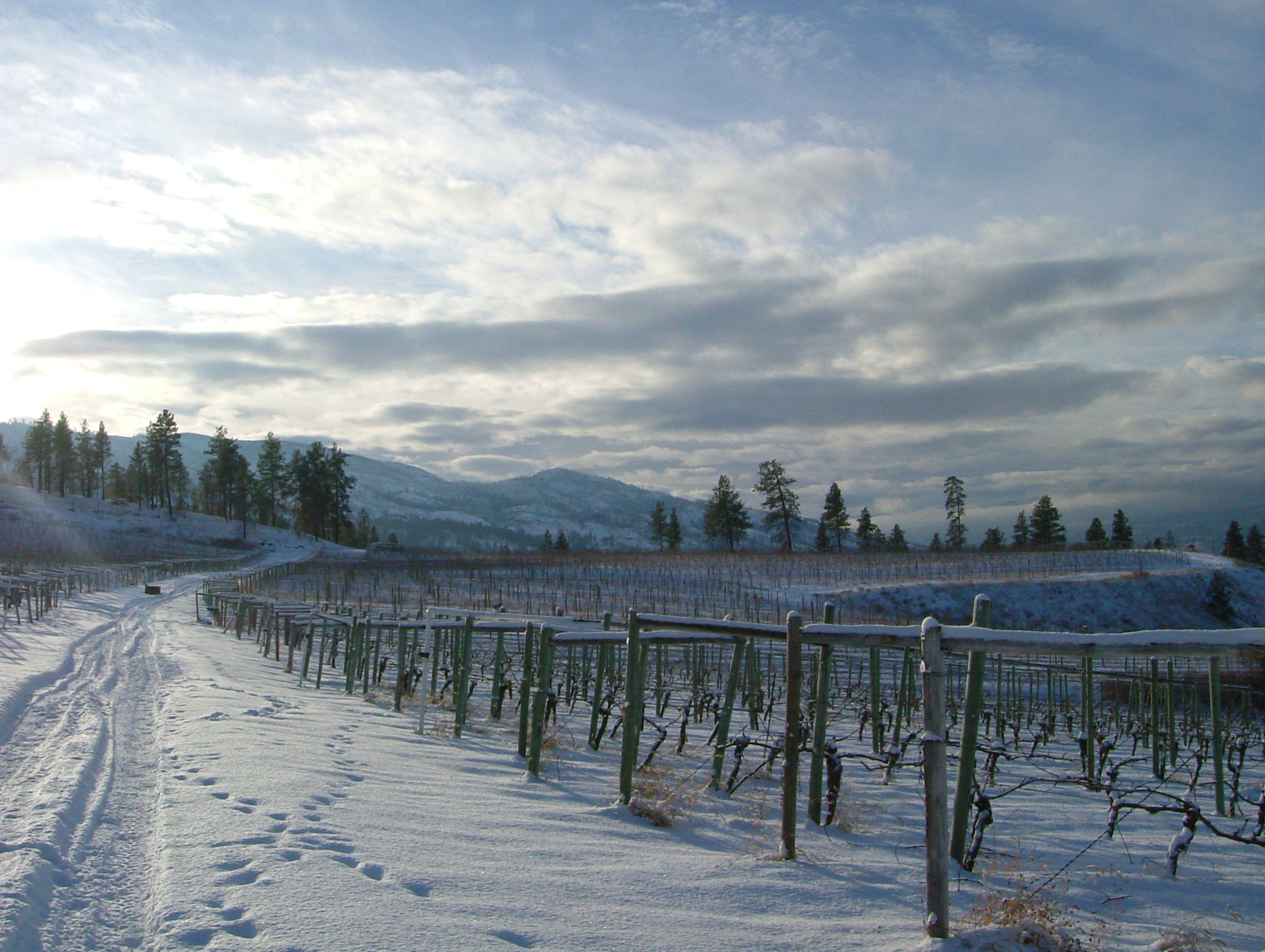
St Hubertus Vineyard in winter

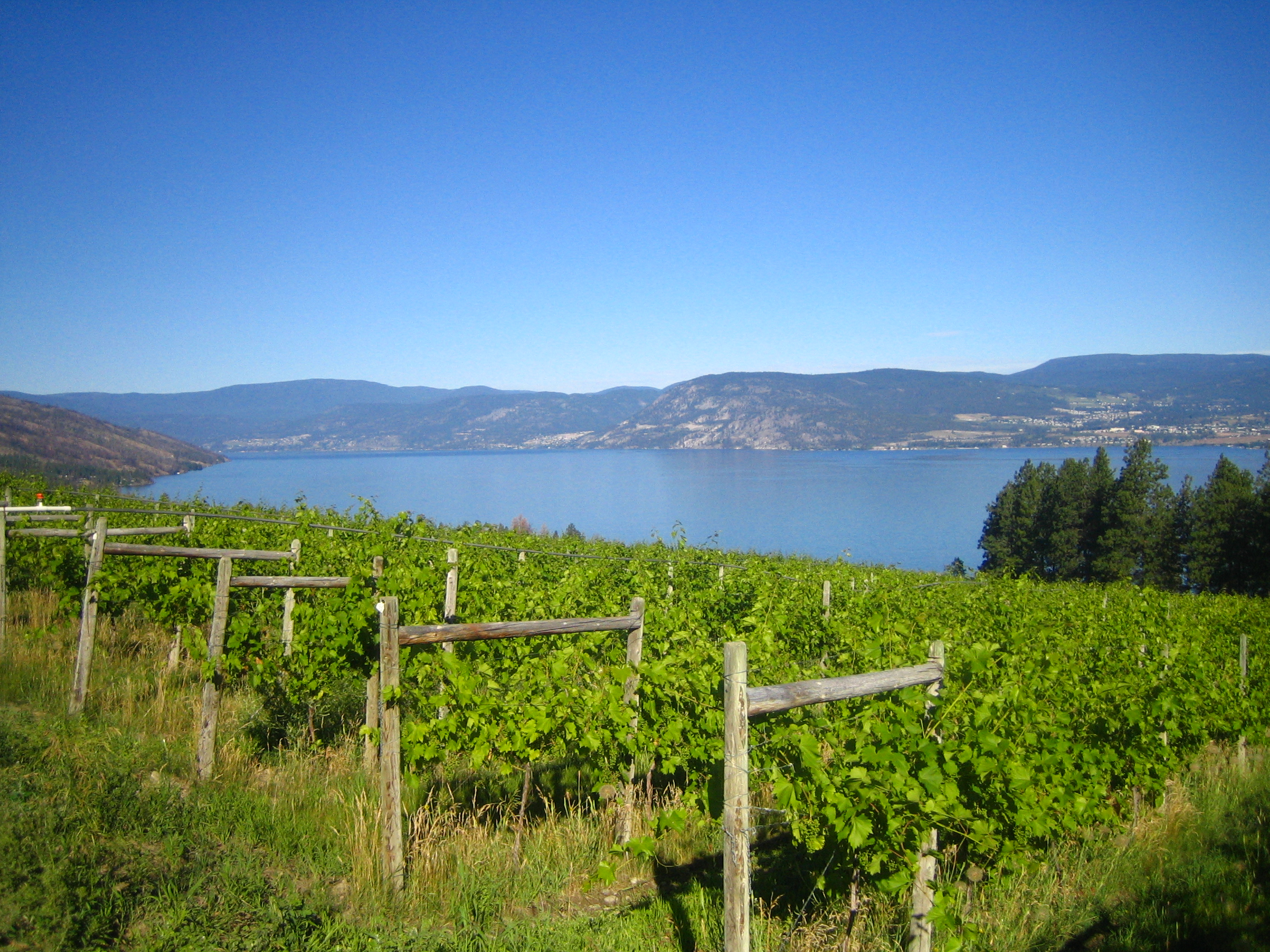
View of Okanagan Lake from Oak Bay Vineyard

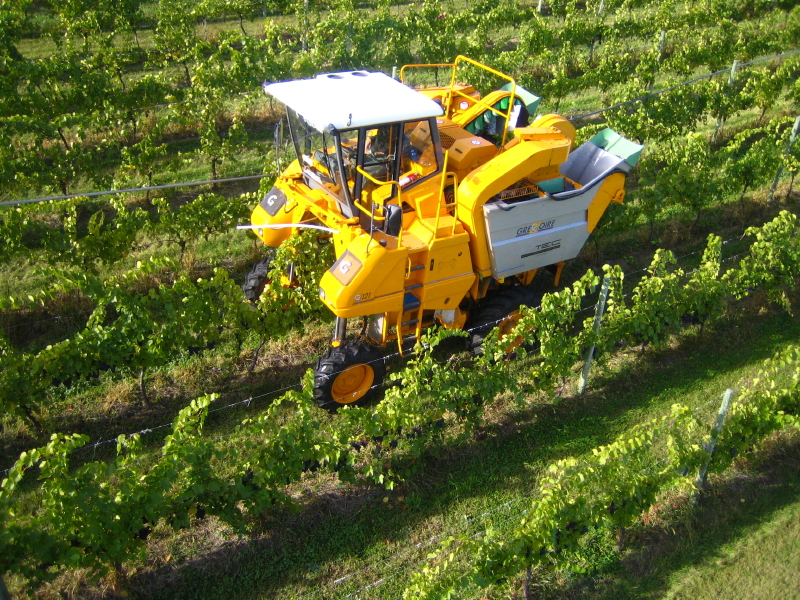
Mechanical Harvester

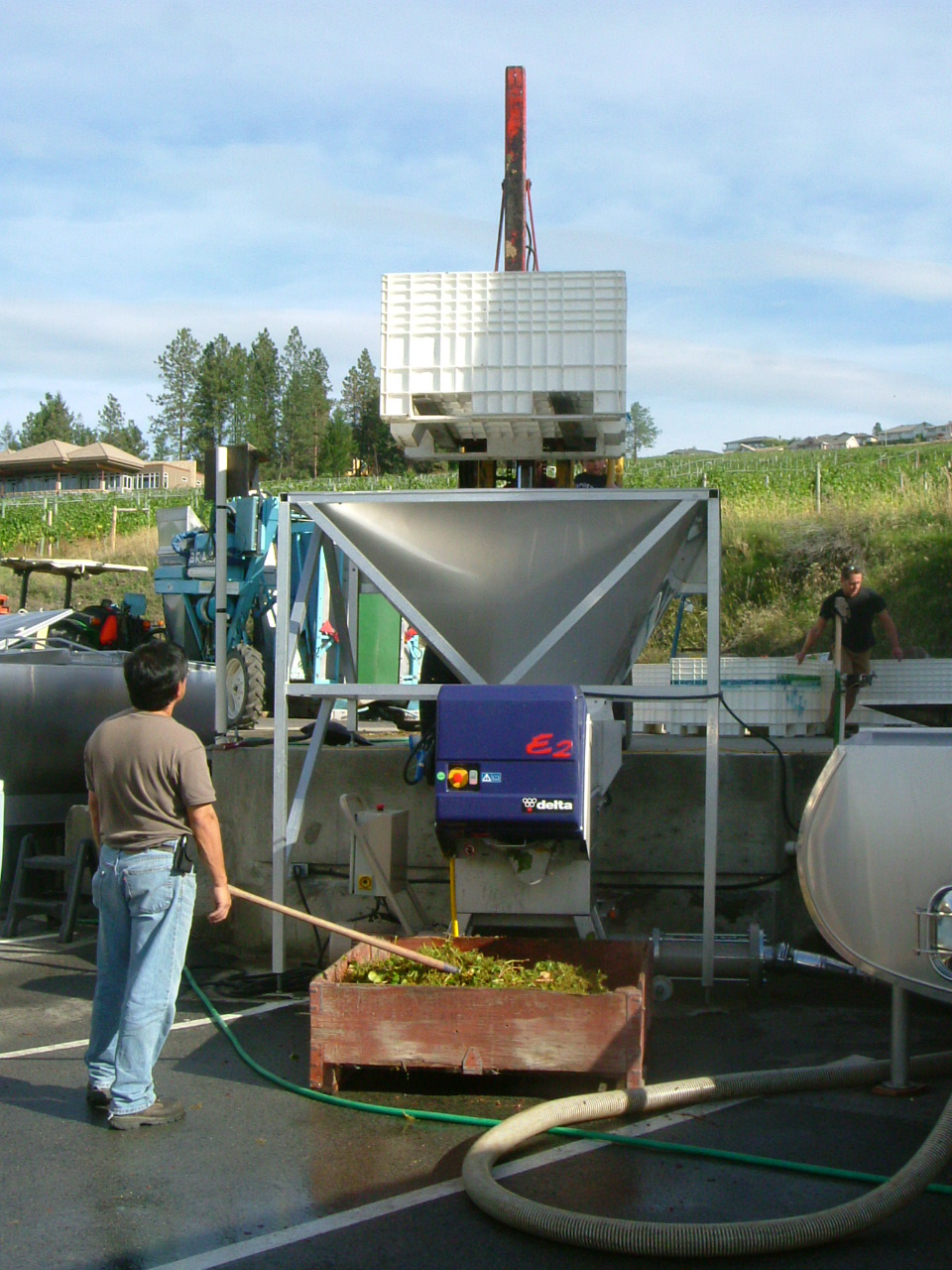
Crushing the grapes at the winery

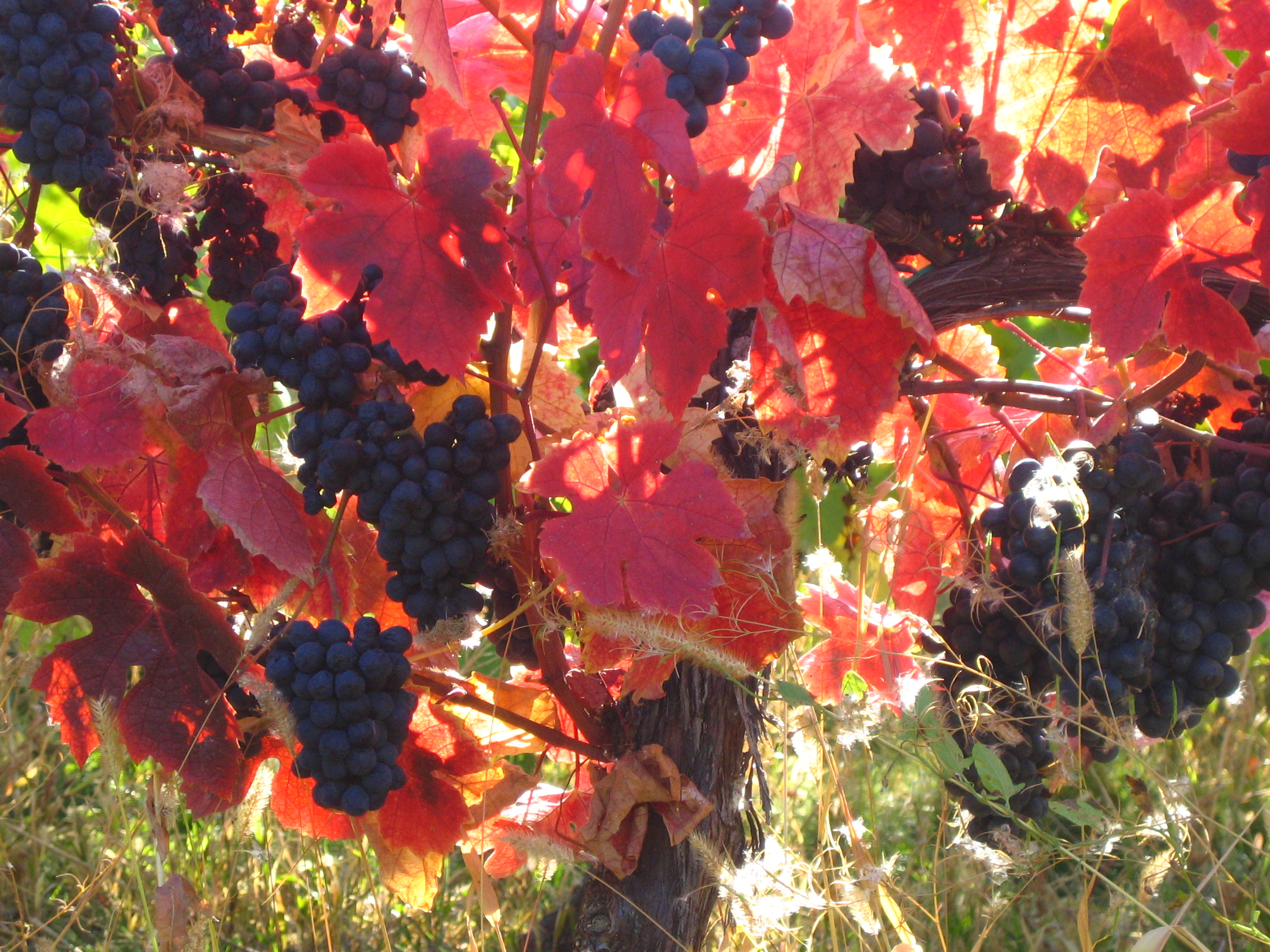
Autumn colour on grape leaves

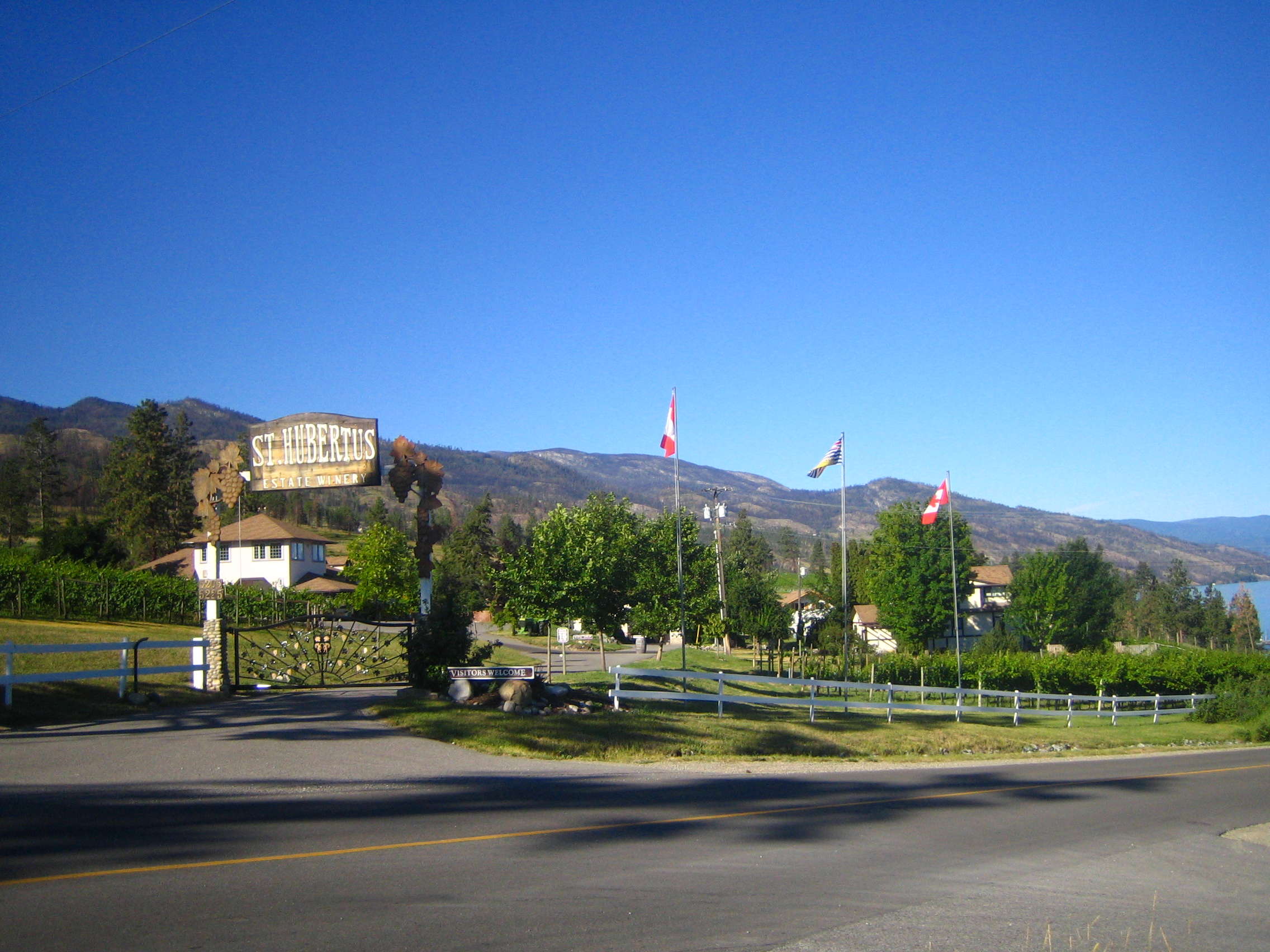
Entrance to St Hubertus Estate Winery

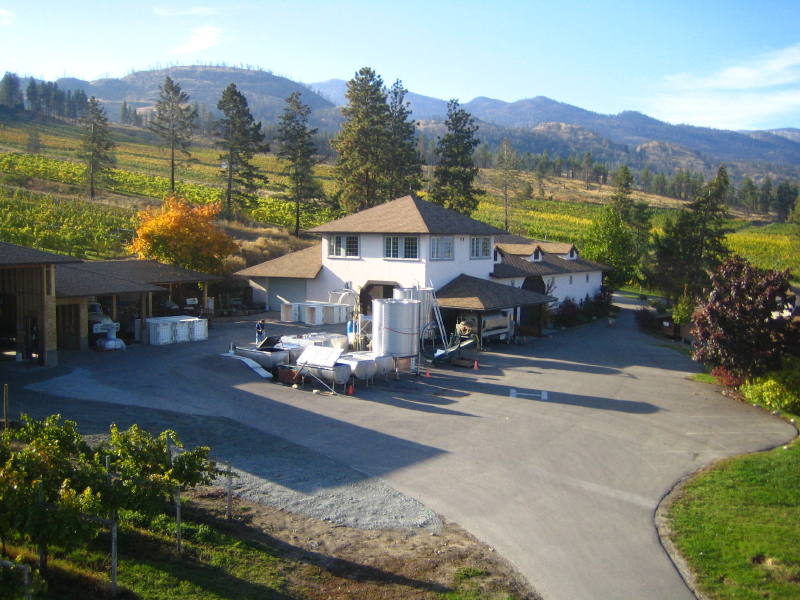
Main building at St Hubertus Estate Winery

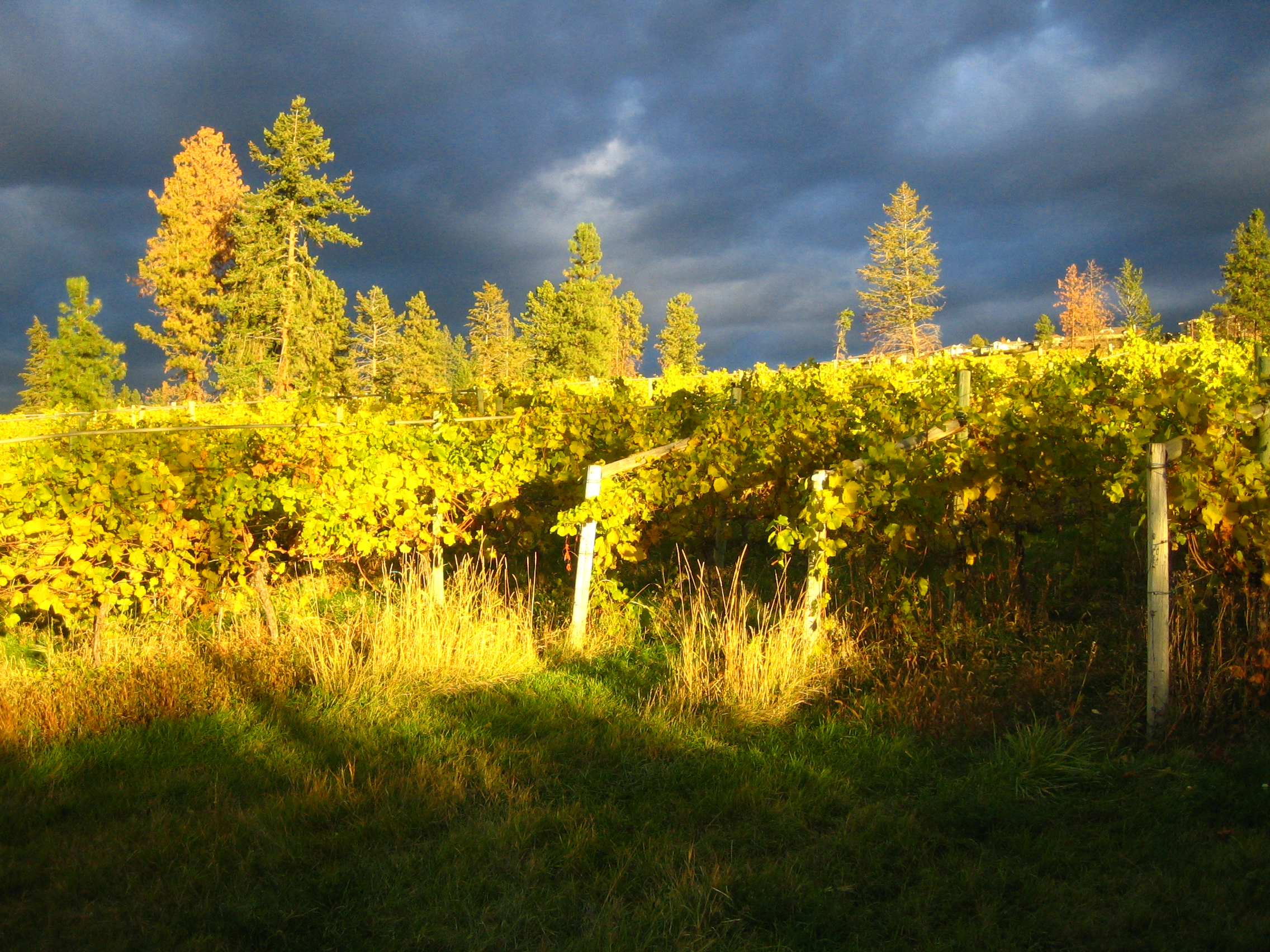
Thunder clouds over St Hubertus Vineyard

== Known For ==
St Hubertus Estate Winery is one of the only wineries in British Columbia producing Chasselas. Chasselas is the primary white grape grown in Switzerland and also known as Fendant. The wineries most popular red is the full flavoured Marechal Foch
