= Rhino Media Group =

Canadian advertising company

- Parent company: Rhino Media Group
- Status: Active
- Founded: 2005
- Founder: Matthew Turgeon
- Country of origin: Canada
- Headquarters location: Montreal, Quebec
- Distribution: Canada & United States
- Publication types: Magazine & Websites
- Nonfiction topics: Real Estates
- Official website: rhinomediagroup.net

Rhino Media Group is a privately owned, Canadian based advertising and publishing company that provides services for the multi-family apartment industry. Founded by Matthew Turgeon in 2005, they operate a print magazine in Canada and two websites that feature property rentals in Canada and the United States. They are considered one of the largest rental publications in Canada and their website RentersPages.com was named as one of the best housing rental websites by Tech & Science.

== History ==
Rhino Media Group was founded by Matthew Turgeon in 2005. The idea came to Turgeon after he was trying to look for rental properties on numerous websites and could not locate any of the features that he wanted in the same site.

The company initially launched the website RentMontrealApartments.com which then became RentQuebecApartments.com in 2006. They launched their print publication Renters' Pages Magazine in 2007, covering the Montreal market. The publication was expanded into Quebec City and Gatineau in 2010 and Halifax, Nova Scotia, in 2012. The company launched a second website in 2008 called RentersPages.com which was available in Canada but expanded into the U.S. Market in 2011. The company also maintains two French websites called TrouveUnAppart.com and PagesDesLocataires.com.

In 2013, the company released an apartment finder app in both English (ApartmentMapp.com) and French (AppartMapp.com).
