= Lucidea =

Library and archival systems supplier

Lucidea logo

Lucidea Corporation (formerly SydneyPLUS International) is a Canadian software company based in Richmond, British Columbia. The company offers products and services for library automation and knowledge management to special libraries, particularly law firms.

== Description of company ==
Lucidea serves organizations and businesses in finance, government, legal services, life sciences, media, and resources. Lucidea has offices in New York and Los Angeles in the United States, and Nottingham in the UK. A private company, its staff is organized into research and development, client services, and sales and marketing.

Lucidea offers SQL and Oracle platforms for client/server installations and an ASP hosted solution. The system is a modular design that lets users add on the applications that they need for their operations. The President of Lucidea is Ron Aspe.

== History ==
The company was founded as SydneyPLUS International in 1989, the result of a merger of International Library Systems Corporation and Sydney Development. A minicomputer version of SydneyPLUS operated in OpenVMS in the 1980s and Unix in 1993. In 1996, SydneyPLUS offered a client/server product for Windows NT or Unix servers.

SydneyPLUS acquired Cuadra Associates in 2008, developers of the Cuadra STAR family of products. It followed with the acquisition of Inmagic, Inc.'s special library business in 2011, including the DB/TextWorks Library Suite.

In June 2013, SydneyPLUS changed its name to Lucidea Corporation.
