= Banff Lodging Co =

Banff Caribou Properties Ltd
- Industry: Hospitality
- Founded: 1985; 41 years ago
- Founder: Wim Pauw
- Area served: Banff National Park
- Revenue: $ 279 million
- Website: www.banffcaribouproperties.com

Banff Caribou Properties is a locally owned and operated hospitality company in the Banff National Park. Previously known as Banff Lodging Co., a division of Banff Caribou Properties, the company has evolved alongside a growing and increasingly diverse portfolio of hospitality ventures. As the business has expanded beyond lodging, it has come full circle, returning to its original corporate brand and legal name: Banff Caribou Properties Ltd.

== History ==
Banff Caribou Properties was founded in 1985 by Wim Pauw when he acquired Caribou Corner, his first commercial mall. The company started with commercial buildings in downtown Banff, Alberta and launched its hospitality business with the opening of its first hotel and restaurant The Banff Caribou Lodge and The Keg.

- 1985 — Caribou Corner 202 & 204 Banff Avenue, a commercial mall; Banff is designated as UNESCO World Heritage Site.
- 1988 — Wolf and Bear Mall 227 & 229 Bear Street is built; Kirby Lane Mall at 119 Banff Avenue is built.
- 1991 — Town Centre Mall 201, 203, & 205 Banff Avenue is built.
- 1993 — Hospitality business launches with the opening of its first hotel and restaurant, The Banff Caribou Lodge and The Keg.
- 1995 — Chustas Mall 117 Banff Ave is built; 2nd Keg Restaurant opens at 117 Banff Ave.
- 1996 — Banff Ptarmigan Inn and Arrow Motel are acquired.
- 1999 — Banff Ptarmigan Inn receives major renovations and a wing is now named Driftwood Inn.
- 2000 — Hidden Ridge Resort is acquired.
- 2002 — Rundle Manor Apt is acquired.
- 2003 — Hidden Ridge Resort completes phase 1 of expansion.
- 2005 - Inns of Banff, Swiss Village, Reflections Wildfire Grill are acquired.
- 2007 - Fox Hotel & Suites and Chili's Grill & Bar are built.
- 2009 - Hidden Ridge Resort final phases of renovations complete. (new lobby, hot tubs, parkade, and units are added).
- 2010 - Ultimate Ski & Ride, ski rental and retail store is acquired (April 30, 2010).
- 2010 - Banff Rocky Mountain Resort (purchased June 1, 2010).
- 2011 - Banff railway station leasehold is acquired.
- 2011 - Wild Bill's Legendary Saloon (purchased May 1, 2011).
- 2014 - Lux Cinema Centre is purchased (April 2014).
- 2014 - Tunnel Mountain Resort is acquired (July 2014).
- 2014 - Bumpers Inn is acquired (December 2014).
- 2014 - Demolished the Driftwood Inn, Arrow Motel, Rundle Manor Apt (October - December)
- 2015 - Moose Hotel & Suites build is started (January)
- 2016 - Moose Hotel & Suites opens to the public (July)
- 2018 - Rocky Mountain Ski Lodge, first hotel in Canmore is acquired (April 2018)
- 2019 - Bumpers Inn is closed permanently and undergoes major renovations (Oct 2019)
- 2020 - The Dorothy Motel opens to guests
- 2020 - Red Carpet Inn, Irwin's Mountain Inn, The Rundlestone Lodge are acquired (Dec 15, 2020)
- 2023 - Hotel Canoe & Suites & Downtown Sally, Sudden Sally (2023)
- 2024 - Otter Hotel & Good Folk Restaurant (2024)
- 2025 - Paradise Lodge & Bungalows (January 15, 2025)

== Properties ==
=== Commercial Properties ===
- Caribou Corner Mall
- Wolf & Bear Street Mall
- Town Centre Mall
- Chustas Mall

=== Accommodations ===
- Banff Caribou Lodge & Spa
- Banff Ptarmigan Inn
- The Dorothy Motel
- Hidden Ridge Resort
- Tunnel Mountain Resort
- Red Carpet Inn
- Irwin's Mountain Inn
- The Rundlestone Lodge
- Fox Hotel & Suites
- Banff Rocky Mountain Resort
- Moose Hotel and Suites
- Hotel Canoe & Suites
- Otter Hotel
- Rocky Mountain Ski Lodge
- Pocaterra Inn and Waterslide
- Paradise Lodge & Bungalows

=== Restaurants ===
- The Keg Steakhouse & Bar (Banff Caribou Lodge & Spa)
- The Meatball Pizza & Pasta (Ptarmigan Inn)
- Chili's Grill & Restaurant (Fox Hotel and Suites)
- Alpha Bistro (Banff Rocky Mountain Resort)
- Pacini (Moose Hotel & Suites)
- Sudden Sally (Hotel Canoe & Suites)
- Good Folk (Otter Hotel)

=== Other Divisions ===
- Red Earth Spa (Banff Caribou Lodge)
- Meadow Spa & Pools (Moose Hotel & Suites)
- Ultimate Ski & Ride (Caribou Corner Mall)
- Lux Theatre (Wolf & Bear Mall)
