= Jackson Grills =

Jackson Grills Inc.
- Industry: Manufacturing
- Founded: 1999
- Founder: Alan Jackson
- Headquarters: Abbotsford, British Columbia
- Products: Outdoor Grills
- Website: http://www.jacksongrills.com/

Jackson Grills, founded in 1999, is based out of Abbotsford, British Columbia. It is best known for being a specialty manufacturer of quality barbecues, fire features and outdoor kitchen accessories. Jackson Grills carries three lines of specialty grills, ranging in size from small portable grills to freestanding and built-in barbecues.

Being started in Duncan, British Columbia by Al Jackson, the company has since expanded its geographic reach, with distribution across the United States and Canada, but with a focus on the Western Corridor. In November 2011, the company underwent a change of ownership. With the company now operating out of Abbotsford, British Columbia, owner Ken Friesen shows plans to expand the company over the upcoming years.
