= Esprida =

Esprida Corporation
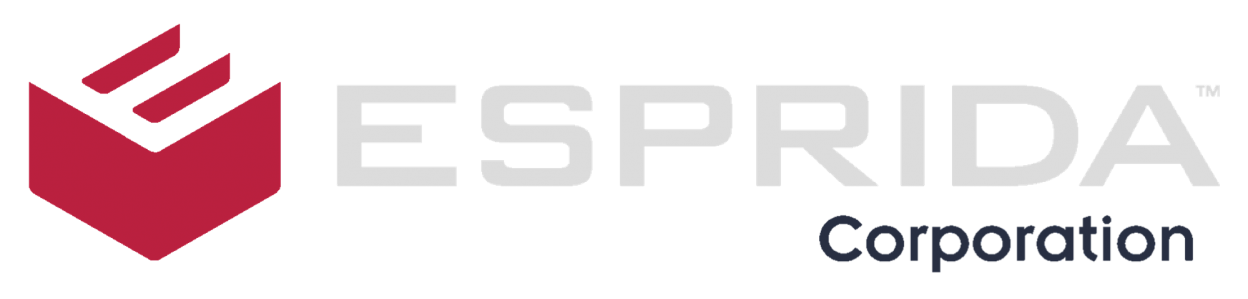
- Company type: Private company
- Industry: Technology
- Founded: 1999
- Headquarters: Mississauga, Ontario, Canada
- Key people: Anila Jobanputra, president
- Products: Esprida LiveControl
- Number of employees: 39 (2008)
- Website: esprida.com

Esprida is a privately held company that creates and markets remote device management middleware built on a service-oriented architecture (SOA) platform.

Esprida software enables communication between devices and users via the Internet. From a single computer, a user is able to send and receive messages from multiple self-service kiosks or standalone intelligent devices.

The largest non-ATM deployments in the world are Powered by Esprida. Customers include Kodak

Alaris, Aisle7, Michigan Department of State, and BehrColorSmart.

Other organizations that provide similar software products include Axeda Corp. and Questra.

== History ==
Formerly called TouchPoint Solutions Inc., Esprida was renamed in August 2005 to reflect its position in the self-service market as purely a software provider with a platform to manage large numbers of geographically dispersed devices.
