= Farmbucks =

Canadian agricultural technology company

Farmbucks Inc.
- Company type: Private
- Industry: Agricultural technology
- Founded: 2018; 7 years ago
- Founder: Lynn Dargis
- Headquarters: St. Vincent, Alberta, Canada
- Products: Grain price comparison platform (web and mobile app)
- Website: farmbucks.com

Farmbucks, Inc. is a Canadian agricultural technology company headquartered in St. Vincent, Alberta. Founded in 2018 by Lynn Dargis, it operates a digital platform for collecting and comparing grain prices from multiple buyers.

== History ==
The platform launched in January 2019, and offered pricing information to grain and oilseed producers in Western Canada. Version 2 was released at the end of February 2019, offering price history lines, price alerts, geographic locations, and instant contact with buyers. In July 2019, Telus Corporation awarded Farmbucks the "Most Promising Startup Award" as a part of TELUS Pitch contest. In 2020, Farmbucks claimed the first place in the Forum for Women Entrepreneurs (FWE) Pitch for the Purse program.
