= GoodMorning.com =

Canadian mattress and sleep product company

- Type: Private
- Industry: Mattress, Bedding, E-commerce
- Founded: 2009
- Founder: Sam Prochazka, Andy Prochazka, Helenka Prochazka
- Headquarters: Edmonton, Alberta, Canada
- Area served: Canada, United States
- Products: Mattresses, Pillows & Bedding, Mattress Foundations, Bed Frames

GoodMorning (formerly Novosbed, and legally incorporated as GoodMorning.com Inc.) is a Canadian E-commerce mattress and sleep product company. The majority of their products are manufactured and sold in Canada, with select products made and sold in the United States.

== History ==
Headquartered in Edmonton, Alberta, Canada, the company was co-founded in 2009 by siblings Sam Prochazka, Andy Prochazka, and Helenka Prochazka under the name Novosbed. It was financed with $40,000 of personal investment.

It has been described as a "retail disruptor" by the National Retail Federation due to the in-home sleep trial and associated refund policy that they are widely credited as pioneering. The trial allows customers to purchase a mattress online and sleep on it for several months in the comfort of their homes while deciding if its the best fit for their sleep needs. Any mattress returned during the sleep trial comes with a money-back guarantee. All returned mattresses are recycled or donated to a charity in need through the company's donation program. According to CBC News, mattress-in-a-box companies with sleep trials "exploded" from a handful to more than 150 in the mid-2010s. Prochazka has said the at-home risk-free sleep trial is "what made beds in boxes go viral."

Novosbed originally manufactured its mattresses in China but moved production to the United States in 2012 where US orders are now built in Pennsylvania. Novosbed mattresses sold in Canada are manufactured in the Toronto area.

In 2017, the company began expanding its Canadian product catalogue to include additional foam and spring-hybrid mattress brands at a variety of price points.

In 2019, Novosbed changed its name to GoodMorning.com and launched a new website under the same name that houses its full mattress product line, as well as sleep accessories. Later, in 2025, the company dropped the domain suffix in its public branding, simplifying to the GoodMorning brand name. Its portfolio of brands include Douglas, Juno, Logan & Cove, and Octave (formerly Novosbed).

== Donation Program ==
In a 2014 BBC News interview, the company's return rates were said to be 3%, substantially below the industry average of 10%.

In 2020, GoodMorning formed a charity partnership with the Make-A-Wish Foundation of Canada and donated $50,000 in new beds to children across Canada fighting critical illnesses during the COVID-19 pandemic.
