= French Shoes =

Defunct Canadian franchise

French Shoes was a shoe chain headquartered in Montreal, Quebec. It began in 1956, with its last location closing in the 1990s.

French Shoes featured stylish and affordable women's shoes, growing to 30 locations throughout the provinces of Quebec and Ontario.

The founder of French Shoes was Seymour (Sonny) Lubin (1932–2009) who was joined by Gerard Gingras in the early years of the chain.

The company was sold in 1979 to Bata Shoes, which was seeking to enter a higher grade of shoe market. However, the acquisition was not successful and the brand was sold again a few years to later to Calderone Shoes, a large Toronto shoe company started by Joseph Calderone Calderone Shoes eventually fell on hard times, and the French Shoes legend and name died.
