= KMS Tools =

Canadian retail company

Coordinates: 49.2347542°N 122.8707594°W

KMS Tools & Equipment Ltd.

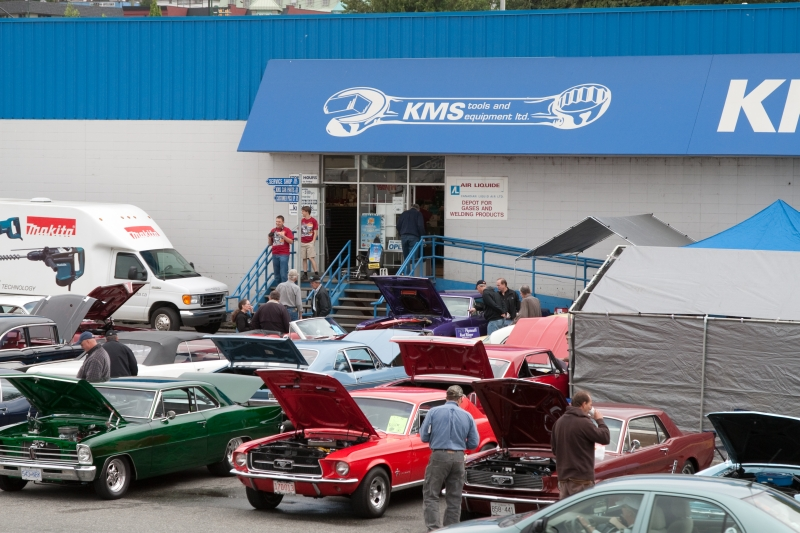
- Type: Privately held company
- Industry: Retail
- Founded: 1983; 43 years ago
- Headquarters: Coquitlam, British Columbia, Canada
- Key people: Stan Pridham (founder)
- Products: Industrial
- Website: https://www.kmstools.com/

KMS Tools & Equipment is an industrial tool distributor. KMS Tools is a Canadian retailer of power tools, automotive, woodworking, welding, metalworking tools with construction equipment and car parts. It was founded in Coquitlam, BC in 1983 by Stan Pridham. It continues to be 100% Canadian and BC owned and operated by Stan Pridham who lives in BC.

== Overview ==
As of June 2022, KMS Tools operates 15 stores across Western Canada. The company offices and distribution warehouse are both located in Abbotsford with the main store, CAR Parts, and the Service & Repair department in coquitlam. In 2016 KMS Tools launched a series of new stationary woodworking tools under their house brand Magnum Industrial. These replaced the older "green" General International tools from Taiwan they had carried since they acquired House of Tools. They mail out a new 48 page catalog to all its club members every month. In 2020 they opened a web fulfillment centre in Abbotsford, BC to support the growing trend of customers buying online from their website.

== History ==
KMS Tools follows a retail store format with an industrial sales staff for education and larger accounts. Because of its large automotive enthusiast customer base, KMS Tools has also run a Show & Shine out of its Coquitlam location since 1995.

In 2009, KMS Tools took over the BC operations of the bankrupt former House of Tools. In addition to gaining a store in Langley, KMS Tools opened its first stores on Vancouver Island.

== Stores ==
As of December 2025, KMS Tools has stores in the following locations (in order of date established):

=== British Columbia ===
- Coquitlam
- Abbotsford
- Kamloops
- Kelowna
- Coquitlam Car Parts
- Coquitlam Service Department
- Victoria
- Langley
- Chilliwack
- Prince George
- Nanaimo

=== Alberta ===
- Red Deer
- Calgary
- Grande Prairie
- Edmonton West
- Edmonton South

=== Saskatchewan ===
- Saskatoon
