= Petcetera =

Pet specialty supply retailer

- Company type: Pet Store
- Industry: Retail
- Founded: 1997
- Founder: Dan Urbani
- Defunct: 2014
- Fate: Bankrupt; stores liquidated
- Headquarters: Richmond, British Columbia, Canada
- Products: Pet Supplies, Grooming, Training, Vet, Daycare,
- Owner: Dan Urbani
- Website: Petcetera

Petcetera was a pet specialty supply retailer founded in Richmond, British Columbia in 1997 by Dan Urbani. The chain had expanded to 49 stores and 1,600 employees across Canada, before filing for bankruptcy in 2009. A number of restructures followed until the final store was closed in 2014.

== History ==
Petcetera was founded in 1997 by Dan Urbani. The stores offered more than 10,000 pet products, as well as pet care services including pet hospitals (Vetcetera), pet grooming, obedience school and doggy daycare.

On March 20, 2009, Petcetera announced that, due to the recession, it was filing for creditor protection, and would start offering discounts on products in order to generate cash flow. The company had become shackled with $30 million in debt, including a bank loans from HSBC totaling $16 million.

On June 16, 2009, Petcetera officially filed for bankruptcy; however, Urbani announced on September 1, 2009, that he had bought 20 of Petcetera's most profitable locations out of liquidation, reopening them under the new corporate name of New Petcetera Retail Ltd.

In May 2014, the company announced that it would close all of its Canadian stores. Of the remaining 18 stores, 9 closed and 9 were sold to other pet stores. "As we developed our restructuring plan it became evident the only viable options available to us were to either close or sell the stores." said President and CEO Dan Urbani. "While we have been forced to close 9 stores we are pleased that 9 stores have been sold and will continue operating as pet stores".

== In popular culture ==
- A Petcetera store was filmed in a scene of the 2001 film See Spot Run. The entire pet store was getting destroyed in that scene.
