= Digitcom =

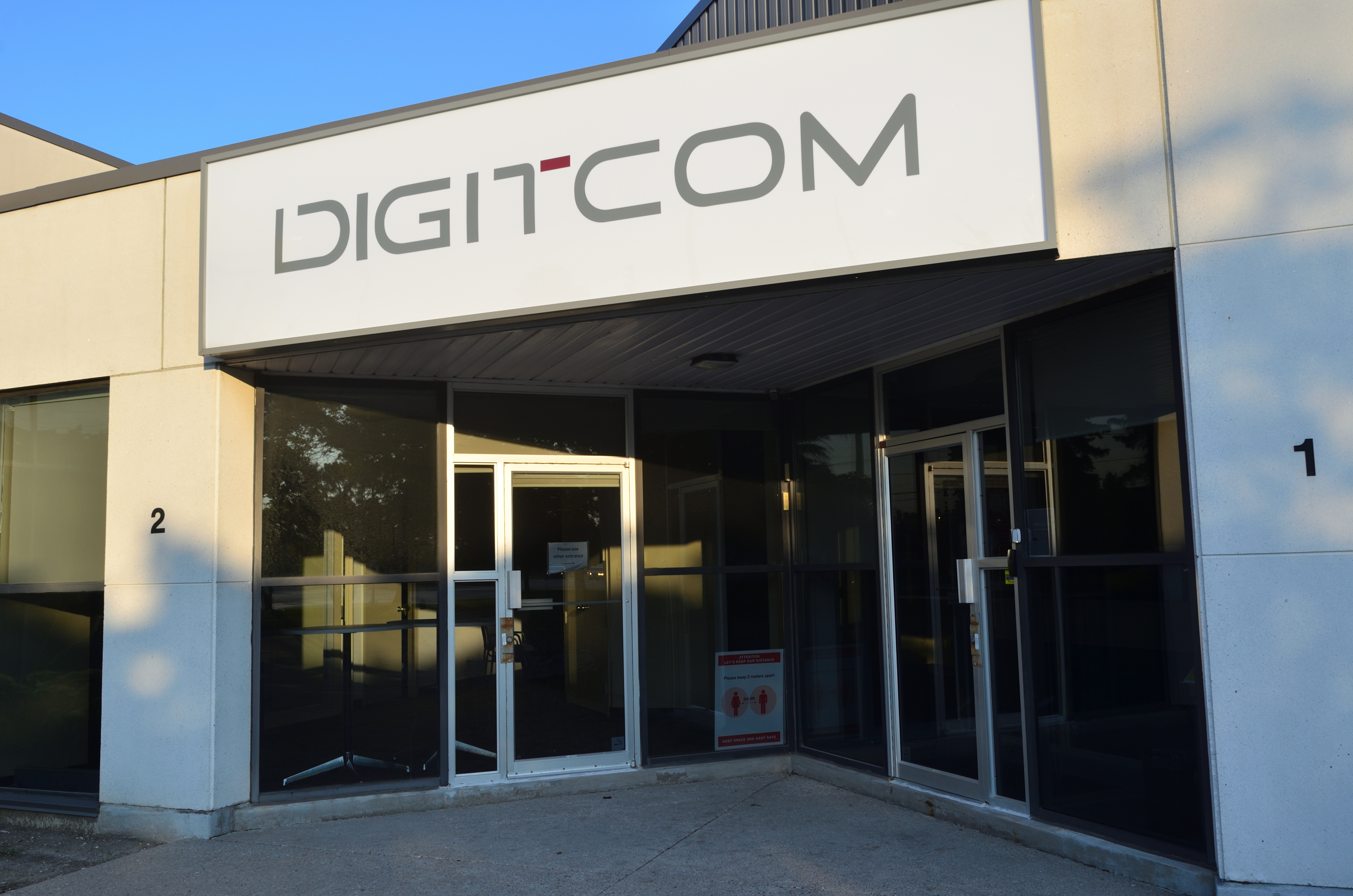
- Digitcom HQ in Markham
- Industry: Telecommunications
- Founded: 1991; 35 years ago
- Defunct: February 23, 2023
- Fate: Acquired by Comwave
- Headquarters: Markham, Ontario, Canada
- Areas served: Greater Toronto, Montreal, Southern Ontario
- Website: digitcom.ca

Digitcom Canada Inc. was a Canadian company specializing in phone systems and data networks distribution, primarily serving the Greater Toronto, Montreal, and Southern Ontario small and midsize enterprise (SME) markets.

== History ==
Established in 1991, Digitcom began as a reseller of voice mail, specializing in selling the Octel Compass product to the Canadian business market. The company expanded in 1993, which saw the inclusion of the sales and support of Avaya, Cisco, and the legacy Nortel line of telephony products.

== Insolvency and Bankruptcy ==
On October 31, 2022 Digitcom began insolvency proceedings through the Ontario courts. The process of attracting and choosing a bidder for the bulk of Digitcom's assets lasted into late February 2023. On February 23, 2023 justice J. Kimmel approved the sale of Digitcom's assets to Comwave. The sale price is reported to have been $1.75M.

The corporation formerly known as Digitcom, now known as 1984638 Ontario Inc., then filed for bankruptcy per a letter to creditors dated March 22, 2023.
