= Corma Inc. =

Canadian equipment manufacturer

Corma, Inc.
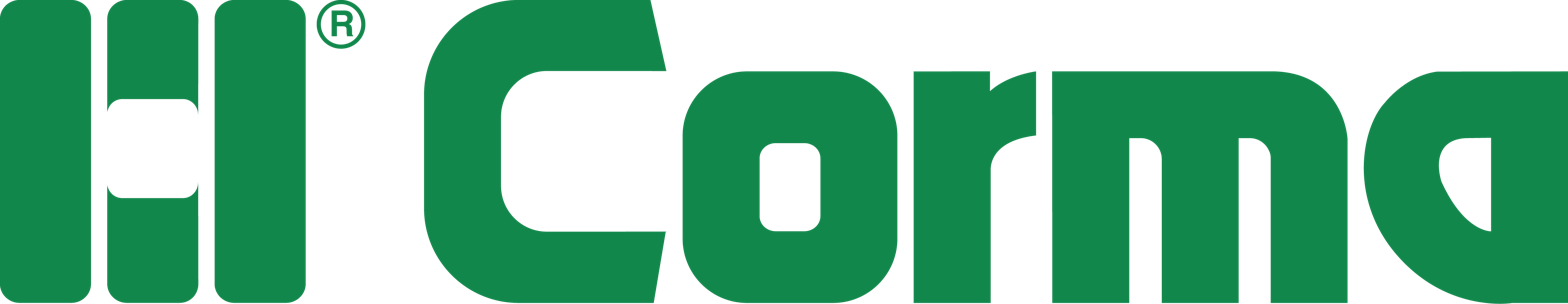
- Company type: Private
- Industry: Machinery manufacturing
- Founded: 1973
- Founder: Manfred Lupke
- Headquarters: Vaughan, Ontario, Canada
- Area served: 100+ countries
- Key people: Manfred Lupke, Stefan Lupke
- Products: Corrugated plastic pipes
- Services: Machinery
- Revenue: US$19.3 million
- Number of employees: ~250 (2014)
- Website: https://www.corma.com/

Corma Inc. is a manufacturer of corrugated plastic pipe production systems headquartered in the Concord neighborhood of Vaughan, Canada. The company's headquarters and principal manufacturing plant are located in Concord, Ontario. Corma also maintains its own aluminum alloy foundry, located in Forest, Ontario, where it forms the mold blocks used in its corrugators. Corma also has a plant in Shanghai, China. Corma has sales and service offices in Colombia, Egypt, El Salvador, Germany, India, Ireland, Japan, and Portugal.

Corma is a major producer of corrugated pipes, and one of the world's largest producers of it. Corma also produces mold blocks, extruders, and drilling machines.

== History ==
Corma's first M600 corrugated plastic pipe-making machine, also known as a corrugator, was delivered to Akatherm in Saint John, New Brunswick, in 1974. In 1978, Corma applied for their first patents in double-wall pipe production and vacuum forming. Over the years Corma received patents for mold block technologies, Internal pipe cooling, inline coupling, and many other quality enhancing technologies. In total, Corma has applied for, and received, more than 300 patents since 1973.

In 2006, Corma established the Corma Shanghai Co. Ltd. sales/service office and manufacturing centre in the People's Republic of China.

== Patents ==
Corma Inc. holds over 300 patents related to corrugators. The company continues to defend its patents from infringement by other companies.

== Awards and recognition ==
- 2012 – Her Majesty Queen Elizabeth II Diamond Jubilee Medal
- 2012 - Vaughan Chamber of Commerce – Business of the Year Award – Exporter
- 2011 - Vaughan Chamber of Commerce – Business of the Year Award – Technological Excellence
- 2010 - Federation des Plastiques et Alliances Composites, Honoris Innova Award – Commercialization.
- 2009 - Vaughan Chamber of Commerce – Exporter of the Year Award
- 2007 - CPIA Canadian Plastics Industry Association – Leader of the Year Award – Manfred Lupke – CEO of Corma
- 2005 - Vaughan Chamber of Commerce – Exporter of the Year Award
- 2003 - Vaughan Chamber of Commerce – Company of the Year Award
- 2001 - Vaughan Chamber of Commerce – Exporter of the year Award, Finalist
- 2000 - Vaughan Chamber of Commerce – Exporter of the year Award, Finalist
- 1999 - Vaughan Chamber of Commerce – Exporter of the year Award
