= Packers Plus Energy Services =

Oil and Gas company

Packers Plus Energy Services Inc.
- Type: Private
- Industry: Oilfield Services
- Founded: 2000
- Headquarters: Calgary, Alberta
- Key people: Dan Themig, Peter Krabben, Ken Paltzat, Stuart Wilson
- Products: Open and cased hole multi-stage completion tools
- Website: PackersPlus.com

Packers Plus Energy Services, Inc. is a privately held, Calgary-based oil and gas service company. The company is the innovator of StackFRAC, an open hole multi-stage ball drop completion system. Packers Plus was founded in 2000 by Dan Themig, Ken Paltzat and Peter Krabben. Stuart Wilson is President and CEO of the company. Packers Plus' patent on the StackFRAC system was invalidated by a Canadian Federal Court judge in December 2017. The judge's decision stemmed from his conclusion that the StackFRAC technology was "obvious to skilled persons". Packers Plus has appealed this ruling.

== History ==
In January 2000, Dan Themig, Peter Krabben and Ken Paltzat founded Packers Plus Energy Services, Inc. Eighteen months later, Dan Themig was asked by a Houston-based company to present ideas on how to increase production in a horizontal well. Themig sketched a few ideas on a napkin on a flight from Calgary to Houston to present to the customer. The Houston-based company chose what would later become the StackFRAC system. StackFRAC is an open hole ball drop completion system credited with unlocking unconventional resources once thought to be uneconomical to produce. The company is also focused on high pressure/high temperature applications, high pressure retrievables and specialty downhole tools. Packers Plus also created the QuickFRAC batch fracturing system, the SF Cementor stage tool and Titanium XV HPHT system. In 2015, the Packers Plus ePLUS Retina Monitoring System won the World Oil Best Visualization and Collaboration award. The Retina is designed to detect multi-stage completion system operations and their effects on the reservoir.

== Business operations ==
Packers Plus operates a semi-automated manufacturing centre in Edmonton, Alberta. It features automated assembly robots capable of building upwards of 600 tools per day and automated torque and test cells designed to test tools up to 10,000 psi.

Packers Plus has also built a Rapid Tool Development facility in Edmonton, Alberta which houses its engineering, research and development and testing personnel. In addition, Packers Plus also has a Manufacturing Facility, Rapid Tool Development, Technology Centre and Corporate Office in Houston, Texas. The company has operations in Canada, the U.S. and areas outside North America including the Middle East, North Africa and Latin America.

== See also ==
- List of oilfield service companies
