= Pultronics =

Pultronics inc.
- Industry: Semiconductors, Electronics
- Founded: 1994
- Headquarters: Montreal, Quebec, Canada
- Key people: Ewa Sokolowska (CEO)
- Products: Sensors, RFID, Integrated Circuits, Analog, Monitoring services
- Website: www.pultronics.com

Pultronics inc. is a Canadian fabless semiconductor and software design house founded in 1994. It develops stand-alone electronic circuits, RFID tags (and readers), sensors and monitoring services. In addition it offers design services in several realms, ranging from microelectronics to custom IP services.

== Early years ==
Early on, Pultronics delved in the field of optoelectronics. It explored how optoelectronic techniques can be used in the testing of integrated circuits (ICs). Other optoelectronics research focused on optical distribution systems and on how packaging affects optical transmissions.

== Pultronics today ==
Today (>1998), Pultronics is involved in the RFID industry with its active RFID systems for long-range wireless data communications. Tracking of goods/assets through a cold chain is a typical usage of such systems. Pultronics is also active in the micro-transmitter system design including design of ASICs resulting in miniature sized active tags.

== Achievements ==
Pultronics has contributed to the design flow of integrated circuits. Through the development of TED, an EDA thermal analysis tool of ICs, Pultronics provided an additional layer of verification to integrated circuit design. What makes TED different from other similar tools is that the thermal analysis is based on the physical topology of the IC instead of its schematic entry.

Pultronics has also contributed to the testing of integrated circuits with the development of independent modules that could be placed directly on the IC. Such modules typically provide valuable information on the performance of the IC without resorting to complex measurement setups. Traditional methods of IC testing can require measurement equipment which are costly (>10-100k$) and can also distort the measured information.
