= Index of New York City-related articles =

The following is an alphabetical list of articles related to New York City. New York City is a city in the United States state of New York.

== 0–9 ==
- .nyc
- 1 Police Plaza
- 1 Wall Street
- 2 World Trade Center
- 3 World Trade Center
- 4 Times Square
- 4 World Trade Center
- 4th Street (Manhattan)
- 5 World Trade Center
- 7 World Trade Center
- 7 World Trade Center
- 8 Spruce Street
- 8th Street and St. Mark's Place
- 10 Hudson Yards
- 13th Regiment Armory
- 14th Regiment Armory
- 14th Street (Manhattan)
- 15 Hudson Yards
- 19 Dutch
- 20 Exchange Place
- 21st Century Fox
- 23 Wall Street
- 23rd Regiment Armory
- 23rd Street (Manhattan)
- 28 Liberty Street
- 30 Hudson Yards
- 30 Rockefeller Plaza
- 34th Street (Manhattan)
- 35 Hudson Yards
- 40 Wall Street
- 42nd Street (Manhattan)
- 47th Street (Manhattan)
- 48th Police Precinct Station
- 50 Hudson Yards
- 50 West Street
- 50th Street (Manhattan)
- 51st Street (Manhattan)
- 52nd Police Precinct Station House and Stable
- 52nd Street (Manhattan)
- 53rd Street (Manhattan)
- 53W53
- 54th Street (Manhattan)
- 55 Central Park West
- 55 Hudson Yards
- 55 Wall Street
- 55th Street (Manhattan)
- 56 Leonard Street
- 57th Street (Manhattan)
- 59th Street (Manhattan)
- 60 Wall Street
- 66th Street (Manhattan)
- 68th New York Infantry Regiment
- 69th Regiment Armory
- 70 Pine Street
- 72nd Street (Manhattan)
- 74th Street (Manhattan)
- 79th Street (Manhattan)
- 85th Street (Manhattan)
- 86th Street (Manhattan)
- 89th Street (Manhattan)
- 93rd Street (Manhattan)
- 95th Street (Manhattan)
- 96th Street (Manhattan)
- 110th Street (Manhattan)
- 111 Murray Street
- 111 West 57th Street
- 115th Street Library
- 116th Street (Manhattan)
- 116th Street–Columbia University station
- 125 Greenwich Street
- 125th Street (Manhattan)
- 125th Street station (IRT Broadway–Seventh Avenue Line)
- 126 Madison Avenue
- 130 William Street
- 133rd Street (Manhattan)
- 138 East 50th Street
- 145th Street (Manhattan)
- 145th Street station (IRT Lenox Avenue Line)
- 149th Street–Grand Concourse station
- 155th Street (Manhattan)
- 161st Street (Bronx)
- 168th Street station (New York City Subway)
- 175 Belden Street
- 181st Street station (IND Eighth Avenue Line)
- 181st Street station (IRT Broadway–Seventh Avenue Line)
- 190th Street station
- 200 Vesey Street
- 200 West Street
- 220 Central Park South
- 360 Central Park West
- 369th Regiment Armory
- 383 Madison Avenue
- 425 Park Avenue
- 432 Park Avenue
- 520 Park Avenue
- 555 Edgecombe Avenue
- 731 Lexington Avenue
- 903 Park Avenue
- 1100 Grand Concourse
- 1211 Avenue of the Americas
- 1251 Avenue of the Americas
- 1540 Broadway
- 1717 Broadway
- 1962–1963 New York City newspaper strike
- 1966 New York City transit strike
- 1980 New York City transit strike
- 1984 New York City Subway shooting
- 2005 New York City transit strike
- 2006 New York City plane crash
- 2017–2021 New York City transit crisis
- 2017 New York City truck attack

== A ==
- Abolitionist Place
- Admiral's House (Governors Island)
- Admiral's Row
- Admiral David Glasgow Farragut Gravesite
- African Americans in New York City
- AirTrain JFK
- Albany Street (Manhattan)
- Albee Square
- Alexander Hamilton U.S. Custom House
- Allen Street
- Allerton, Bronx
- Alphabet City, Manhattan
- Amboy Road
- American Airlines Flight 11
- Ann Street (Manhattan)
- Annadale, Staten Island
- Anthology Film Archives
- Apollo Theater
- Apple Bank for Savings
- Architecture of New York City
- Arden Heights, Staten Island
- Arlington, Staten Island
- Arrochar, Staten Island
- Arsenal (Central Park)
- Art Deco architecture of New York City
- Arthur Avenue
- Arthur Kill Road
- Arverne, Queens
- Aspen Knolls
- Astor Place
- Astor Row
- Astoria, Queens
- Astoria Boulevard
- Atlantic Avenue (New York City)
- Auburndale, Queens
- Audubon Avenue
- Audubon Terrace
- Avenue A (Manhattan)
- Avenue B (Manhattan)
- Avenue C (Manhattan)
- Avenue D (Manhattan)
- Avenue U
- Aviation in the New York metropolitan area
- AXA Equitable Center

== B ==
- Bangladeshis in New York City
- Bank of America Tower (Manhattan)
- Bank Street (Manhattan)
- Barnard Hall
- Barren Island, Brooklyn
- Bartow–Pell Mansion
- Bath Beach, Brooklyn
- Battery Park City
- Baxter Street
- Bay Parkway (Brooklyn)
- Bay Ridge, Brooklyn
- Bay Terrace, Queens
- Bay Terrace, Staten Island
- Baychester, Bronx
- Bayside, Queens
- Bayswater, Queens
- Beach Channel Drive
- Beaver Street (Manhattan)
- Bedford–Stuyvesant, Brooklyn
- Bedford Avenue
- Bedford Park, Bronx
- Beechhurst, Queens
- Beekman Place
- Belle Harbor, Queens
- Bellerose, Queens
- Belmont, Bronx
- Bensonhurst, Brooklyn
- Bergen Beach, Brooklyn
- Beverley Squares
- Big Apple
- Billionaires' Row
- Blackwell House
- Blackwell Island Light
- Bleecker Street
- Bleecker Street Cinema
- Block House (Governors Island)
- Bloomfield, Staten Island
- BoCoCa
- Boerum Hill
- Bogardus Place
- Bond Street (Manhattan)
- Book Row
- Borough Park, Brooklyn
- Borough president
- Boroughs of New York City
- Boulevard Gardens Apartments
- Bow Bridge (Central Park)
- Bowery
- Bowne Park
- Breezy Point, Queens
- Briarwood, Queens
- Bridge Plaza, Brooklyn
- Bridge Street (Manhattan)
- Brighton Beach
- Brighton Heights, Staten Island
- Broad Channel, Queens
- Broad Street (Manhattan)
- Broadway–Flushing, Queens
- Broadway (Brooklyn)
- Broadway (Manhattan)
- Broadway theatre
- Broadway Theatre (53rd Street)
- Brooklyn
- Brooklyn Academy of Music
- Brooklyn Bridge
- Brooklyn directories
- Brooklyn Heights
- Brooklyn Navy Yard
- Brooklyn Public Library
- Brooks and Hewitt Halls
- Bronx Borough Courthouse
- Bronx Community College
- Bronx County Courthouse
- Bronx General Post Office
- Bronx Zoo
- Broome Street
- Brownsville, Brooklyn
- Bulls Head, Staten Island
- Bushwick, Brooklyn
- Bushwick Inlet Park

== C ==
- C. Rieger's Sons Factory
- Cabrini Boulevard
- Cadman Plaza
- Cambria Heights, Queens
- Canal Street (Manhattan)
- Canarsie, Brooklyn
- Capitoline Grounds
- Caribbean immigration to New York City
- Carnegie Hall Tower
- Carroll Gardens, Brooklyn
- Casa Amadeo, antigua Casa Hernandez
- Casa Italiana
- Castle Hill, Bronx
- Castle Williams
- Castleton Corners, Staten Island
- Central Brooklyn
- Central Park
- Central Park Tower
- Central Park Zoo
- Centre Market Place
- Centre Street (Manhattan)
- Chambers Street (Manhattan)
- Chapel of the Good Shepherd (Roosevelt Island)
- Chapel of the Intercession Complex and Trinity Cemetery
- Charles Street (Manhattan)
- Charleston, Staten Island
- Chatham Square
- Chelsea, Manhattan
- Chelsea, Staten Island
- Cherry Street (Manhattan)
- Chevra Linas Hazedek Synagogue of Harlem and the Bronx
- Chinatown, Manhattan
- Chinatowns in Brooklyn
- Chinatowns in Queens
- Chinese people in New York City
- Christ Church (Bronx)
- Christopher Street
- Chrysler Building
- Chrystie Street
- Church of Notre Dame (New York City)
- Church of St. Anselm and St. Roch (Bronx)
- Church Street and Trinity Place
- Cinema Village
- Citigroup Center
- City College of New York
- City Hall Park
- City Hospital (Roosevelt Island)
- City Island, Bronx
- City of Greater New York
- City Point (Brooklyn)
- City University of New York
- CitySpire
- Civic Center, Manhattan
- Claremont Avenue
- Clason Point, Bronx
- Clifton, Staten Island
- Climate of New York City
- Clinton Hill, Brooklyn
- Co-op City, Bronx
- Cobble Hill, Brooklyn
- Coenties Slip
- College Point, Queens
- Columbia Street Waterfront District
- Columbus Circle
- Commissioner of Health of the City of New York
- Commissioners' Plan of 1811
- Community boards of Brooklyn
- Community boards of Manhattan
- Community boards of New York City
- Community boards of Queens
- Community boards of Staten Island
- Community boards of the Bronx
- Community gardens in New York City
- Companies listed on the New York Stock Exchange (0–9)
- Companies listed on the New York Stock Exchange (A)
- Companies listed on the New York Stock Exchange (B)
- Companies listed on the New York Stock Exchange (C)
- Companies listed on the New York Stock Exchange (D)
- Companies listed on the New York Stock Exchange (E)
- Companies listed on the New York Stock Exchange (F)
- Companies listed on the New York Stock Exchange (G)
- Companies listed on the New York Stock Exchange (H)
- Companies listed on the New York Stock Exchange (I)
- Companies listed on the New York Stock Exchange (J)
- Companies listed on the New York Stock Exchange (K)
- Companies listed on the New York Stock Exchange (L)
- Companies listed on the New York Stock Exchange (M)
- Companies listed on the New York Stock Exchange (N)
- Companies listed on the New York Stock Exchange (O)
- Companies listed on the New York Stock Exchange (P)
- Companies listed on the New York Stock Exchange (Q)
- Companies listed on the New York Stock Exchange (R)
- Companies listed on the New York Stock Exchange (S)
- Companies listed on the New York Stock Exchange (T)
- Companies listed on the New York Stock Exchange (U)
- Companies listed on the New York Stock Exchange (V)
- Companies listed on the New York Stock Exchange (W)
- Companies listed on the New York Stock Exchange (X)
- Companies listed on the New York Stock Exchange (Y)
- Companies listed on the New York Stock Exchange (Z)
- Concord, Staten Island
- Concourse, Bronx
- Conduit Avenue
- Coney Island
- Coney Island Avenue
- Conference House
- Congregation Baith Israel Anshei Emes
- Congregation Beth Elohim
- Coogan's Bluff
- Cooper Square
- Corona, Queens
- Cortlandt Alley
- Cortlandt Street (Manhattan)
- Country Club, Bronx
- COVID-19 pandemic in New York City
- Crime in New York City
- Cropsey Avenue
- Croton Aqueduct Gate House
- Crotona Park
- Crotona Park East, Bronx
- Crown Heights, Brooklyn
- Cuisine of New York City
- Culture of New York City
- Curry Row
- Cycling in New York City

== D ==
- DeKalb Avenue
- Delancey Street
- Delta Psi, Alpha Chapter building
- Demographic history of New York City
- Demographics of New York City
- Deutsche Bank Center
- Dey Street
- Dining shed
- Ditmars Boulevard
- Ditmas Park, Brooklyn
- Division Street (Manhattan)
- Dollar Savings Bank
- Dongan Hills, Staten Island
- Douglaston–Little Neck, Queens
- Downtown Brooklyn
- Doyers Street
- Duke Ellington Circle
- Duke Ellington House
- Dumbo, Brooklyn
- Dunbar Apartments
- Dyckman House
- Dyckman Street
- Dyckman Street station (IRT Broadway–Seventh Avenue Line)
- Dyckman-Hillside Substation
- Dyer Avenue
- Dyker Heights, Brooklyn

== E ==
- Earl Hall
- East 180th Street station
- East 233rd Street (Bronx)
- East Broadway (Manhattan)
- East Bronx
- East Elmhurst, Queens
- East Flatbush, Brooklyn
- East Harlem
- East New York, Brooklyn
- East River
- East Shore, Staten Island
- East Side (Manhattan)
- East Tremont, Bronx
- East Village, Manhattan
- East Williamsburg, Brooklyn
- Eastchester, Bronx
- Eastern Park
- Eastern Parkway
- Ebbets Field
- Economy of New York City
- Edgar Allan Poe Cottage
- Edgehill Church of Spuyten Duyvil
- Edgemere, Queens
- Edgewater Park (Bronx)
- Education in New York City
- Egbertville, Staten Island
- Eighth Avenue (Brooklyn)
- Eighth Avenue (Manhattan)
- Eldridge Street
- Eleventh Avenue (Manhattan)
- Elizabeth Street (Manhattan)
- Ellis Island
- Elm Park, Staten Island
- Elmendorf Reformed Church
- Elmhurst, Queens
- Eltingville, Staten Island
- Emerson Hill, Staten Island
- Empire Building (Manhattan)
- Empire State Building
- Environment of New York City
- Environmental issues in New York City
- Esplanade (Bronx)
- Essex Crossing
- Essex Street
- Exchange Place (Manhattan)

== F ==
- Far Rockaway, Queens
- Farmers' markets in New York City
- Farragut Houses
- Father Capodanno Boulevard
- Fieldston, Bronx
- Fifth Avenue
- Filipinos in the New York metropolitan area
- Film at Lincoln Center
- Film Guild Cinema
- Film Forum
- Financial District, Manhattan
- First Avenue (Manhattan)
- First Battery Armory
- Fiske Terrace, Brooklyn
- Five Points, Manhattan
- Flags of New York City
- Flatbush, Brooklyn
- Flatbush Avenue
- Flatbush Malls
- Flatiron District
- Flatlands, Brooklyn
- Flatlands Avenue
- Floral Park, New York
- Flushing, Queens
- Flushing Armory
- Flushing Avenue
- Flushing Meadows–Corona Park
- Fonthill Castle and the Administration Building of the College of Mount St. Vincent
- Food and water in New York City
- Fordham, Bronx
- Fordham Plaza, Bronx
- Fordham Road
- Forest Hills, Queens
- Forest Park (Queens)
- Forsyth Street
- Fort Defiance (Brooklyn)
- Fort Greene, Brooklyn
- Fort Hamilton
- Fort Hamilton Parkway
- Fort Jay
- Fort Schuyler
- Fort Tryon Park
- Fort Washington (Manhattan)
- Fort Washington Avenue
- Fort Washington Avenue Armory
- Fort Washington Park (Manhattan)
- Fort Washington Presbyterian Church
- Fort Wadsworth
- Fountain Avenue
- Four Seasons Hotel New York Downtown
- Fourth Avenue (Brooklyn)
- Fourth Church of Christ, Scientist (New York City)
- Fox News
- Francis Lewis Boulevard
- Franklin Square (Manhattan)
- Frederick Douglass Circle
- French Institute Alliance Française
- Fresh Meadows, Queens
- Fresh Pond, Queens
- Front Street (Manhattan)
- Fulton Ferry, Brooklyn
- Fulton Street (Brooklyn)
- Fulton Street (Manhattan)

== G ==
- Garment District, Manhattan
- Gay Street (Manhattan)
- Geography of New York City
- George Abbott Way
- Gerritsen Beach, Brooklyn
- Glen Oaks, Queens
- Glendale, Queens
- Government of New York City
- Governor's House (Governors Island)
- Governors Island
- Gowanus, Brooklyn
- Grace Episcopal Church (Bronx)
- Graffiti in New York City
- Gramercy Park
- Grand Central Madison
- Grand Central Terminal
- Grand Concourse (Bronx)
- Grand Street (Manhattan)
- Grand Street and Grand Avenue
- Graniteville, Staten Island
- Grant City, Staten Island
- Grant's Tomb
- Grasmere, Staten Island
- Gravesend, Brooklyn
- Great Jones Street
- Great Kills, Staten Island
- Greenpoint, Brooklyn
- Greenpoint and Roosevelt Avenues
- Greenpoint Historic District
- Greenridge, Staten Island
- Greenwich Avenue
- Greenwich Street
- Greenwich Village
- Greenwood Heights, Brooklyn
- Grymes Hill, Staten Island
- Gun Hill Road (road)

== H ==
- Hall of Fame for Great Americans
- Hamilton Grange Library
- Hamilton Grange National Memorial
- Hamilton Heights, Manhattan
- Hamilton Heights Historic District
- Harlem
- Harlem African Burial Ground
- Harlem Courthouse
- Harlem Fire Watchtower
- Harlem River Houses
- Harlem YMCA
- Harperly Hall
- Headquarters of the United Nations
- Healthcare in New York City
- Heartland Village, Staten Island
- Hell's Kitchen, Manhattan
- Henry F. Spaulding Coachman's House
- Henry P. Davison House
- Henry Street (Manhattan)
- Hertlein and Schlatter Silk Trimmings Factory
- Hester Street (Manhattan)
- High Bridge (New York City)
- High Pumping Station
- Highbridge, Bronx
- Highland Park (Brooklyn)
- Hindu Temple Society of North America
- Hispanic Society of America
- Historic House Trust
- History of New York City
- History of New York City (1665–1783)
- History of New York City (1784–1854)
- History of New York City (1855–1897)
- History of New York City (1898–1945)
- History of New York City (1946–1977)
- History of New York City (1978–present)
- History of New York City (prehistory–1664)
- History of the New York City Subway
- History of transportation in New York City
- Hollis, Queens
- Holliswood
- Holyrood Episcopal Church
- Homecrest, Brooklyn
- Hotel Theresa
- Houston Street
- Howard Beach, Queens
- Hudson Heights, Manhattan
- Hudson Hill, Bronx
- Hudson Park and Boulevard
- Hudson Square
- Hudson Street (Manhattan)
- Hudson View Gardens
- Hudson Yards, Manhattan
- Hudson Yards (development)
- Huguenot, Staten Island
- Hunts Point, Bronx
- Hylan Boulevard

== I ==
- I Love New York
- IFC Center
- Imperial Apartments
- Indians in the New York City metropolitan area
- Interboro Theatre
- International House of New York
- Inwood, Manhattan
- Irish Americans in New York City
- Islam in New York City
- Italians in New York City
- Ivey Delph Apartments

== J ==
- Jackson Avenue station (IRT White Plains Road Line)
- Jackson Heights, Queens
- Jamaica, Queens
- Jamaica Avenue
- Jamaica Estates, Queens
- Jamaica Hills, Queens
- James Bailey House
- James W. and Lucy S. Elwell House
- James Weldon Johnson Residence
- Japanese in New York City
- Jerome Avenue
- Jerome Park Reservoir
- Jewish arrival in New Amsterdam
- John F. Kennedy International Airport
- John Street (Manhattan)
- Jones Street
- Jumel Terrace Historic District
- Junction Boulevard

== K ==
- Keeper's House at Williamsbridge Reservoir
- Kensington, Brooklyn
- Kew Gardens, Queens
- Kew Gardens Hills, Queens
- Kings Highway (Brooklyn)
- Kingsbridge, Bronx
- Kingsbridge Armory
- Kingsbridge Heights, Bronx
- Kips Bay, Manhattan
- Kissena Boulevard
- Knockdown Center
- Koreans in New York City
- Koreatown, Manhattan
- Koreatown, Queens

== L ==
- Lafayette Street
- LaGuardia Airport
- Langston Hughes House
- Laurelton, Queens
- Law enforcement in New York City
- Le Petit Senegal
- Lefferts Boulevard
- LeFrak City
- Lenox Avenue
- Lenox Hill
- Lexington Avenue
- LGBTQ culture in New York City
- Liberty Avenue (New York City)
- Liberty Island
- Liberty Street (Manhattan)
- Lighthouse Hill, Staten Island
- Lily Pond Avenue
- Linden Boulevard
- Lisanti Chapel
  New York City-related lists:
  - List of arches and bridges in Central Park
  - List of armories and arsenals in New York City and surrounding counties
  - List of art cinemas in New York City
  - List of artists from Brooklyn
  - List of artists in the Metropolitan Museum of Art Guide
  - List of assets owned by the New York Times Company
  - List of ballparks in New York City
  - List of bands formed in New York City
  - List of biotech and pharmaceutical companies in the New York metropolitan area
  - List of books set in New York City
  - List of borough presidents of New York City
  - List of bridges and tunnels in New York City
  - List of Broadway theaters
  - List of Bronx High School of Science alumni
  - List of Bronx neighborhoods
  - List of Brooklyn College alumni
  - List of Brooklyn neighborhoods
  - List of Brooklyn Public Library branches
  - List of Brooklyn thoroughfares
  - List of buildings, sites, and monuments in New York City
  - List of buildings and structures on Broadway in Manhattan
  - List of burials at Green-Wood Cemetery
  - List of bus routes in Brooklyn
  - List of bus routes in Manhattan
  - List of bus routes in Queens
  - List of bus routes in Staten Island
  - List of bus routes in the Bronx
  - List of Carnegie libraries in New York City
  - List of cemeteries in New York City
  - List of City University of New York institutions
  - List of colleges and universities in New York City
  - List of commissioners offices of New York City
  - List of companies based in New York City
  - List of demolished churches in New York City
  - List of demolished hotels in New York City
  - List of disasters in New York City by death toll
  - List of Ellis Island immigrants
  - List of eponymous streets in New York City
  - List of express bus routes in New York City
  - List of Fall 2008 New York Fashion Week fashion shows
  - List of Fashion Institute of Technology alumni
  - List of ferries across the East River
  - List of ferries across the Hudson River to New York City
  - List of films set in New York City
  - List of former municipalities in New York City
  - List of full-block structures in New York City
  - List of high schools in New York City
  - List of Horace Mann School alumni
  - List of hospitals in Brooklyn
  - List of hospitals in Manhattan
  - List of hospitals in New York City
  - List of hospitals in Queens
  - List of hospitals in Staten Island
  - List of hospitals in the Bronx
  - List of hotels in New York City
  - List of incidents of civil unrest in New York City
  - List of interments at Woodlawn Cemetery (Bronx, New York)
  - List of jail facilities in New York City
  - List of Jewish cemeteries in New York City
  - List of lettered Brooklyn avenues
  - List of libraries in 19th-century New York City
  - List of LGBT people from New York City
  - List of Manhattan neighborhoods
  - List of mayors of New York City
  - List of Michelin-starred restaurants in New York City
  - List of museums and cultural institutions in New York City
  - List of museums in New York City
  - List of National Historic Landmarks in New York City
  - List of New York City agencies
  - List of New York City Ballet dancers
  - List of New York City Block and Neighborhood Associations
  - List of New York City borough halls and municipal buildings
  - List of New York City Designated Landmarks in Brooklyn
  - List of New York City Designated Landmarks in Manhattan
  - List of New York City Designated Landmarks in Manhattan above 110th Street
  - List of New York City Designated Landmarks in Manhattan below 14th Street
  - List of New York City Designated Landmarks in Manhattan from 14th to 59th Streets
  - List of New York City Designated Landmarks in Manhattan from 59th to 110th Streets
  - List of New York City Designated Landmarks in Manhattan on smaller islands
  - List of New York City Designated Landmarks in Queens
  - List of New York City Designated Landmarks in Staten Island
  - List of New York City Designated Landmarks in the Bronx
  - List of New York City gardens
  - List of New York City historical anniversaries
  - List of New York City Housing Authority properties
  - List of New York City housing cooperatives
  - List of New York City newspapers and magazines
  - List of New York City parks
  - List of New York City Police Department officers
  - List of New York City Subway lines
  - List of New York City Subway R-type contracts
  - List of New York City Subway services
  - List of New York City Subway stations
  - List of New York City Subway stations in Brooklyn
  - List of New York City Subway stations in the Bronx
  - List of New York City Subway terminals
  - List of New York City Subway transfer stations
  - List of New York City Subway yards
  - List of New York City television and film studios
  - List of New York Institute of Technology alumni
  - List of New York Institute of Technology faculty
  - List of New York Public Library branches
  - List of New York State Historic Markers in Bronx County, New York
  - List of nightclubs in New York City
  - List of numbered Brooklyn streets
  - List of numbered streets in Manhattan
  - List of people from Brooklyn
  - List of people from New York City
  - List of people from Staten Island
  - List of people from the Bronx
  - List of privately owned public spaces in New York City
  - List of public art in New York City
  - List of public elementary schools in New York City
  - List of railroad yards in New York City
  - List of restaurants in New York City
  - List of Queens neighborhoods
  - List of Queens Public Library branches
  - List of schools in the Roman Catholic Archdiocese of New York
  - List of ships named City of New York
  - List of ships named New York City
  - List of smaller islands in New York City
  - List of songs about New York City
  - List of Staten Island neighborhoods
  - List of streetcar lines in Brooklyn
  - List of streetcar lines in the Bronx
  - List of tallest buildings in Brooklyn
  - List of tallest buildings in New York City
  - List of tallest buildings in Queens
  - List of tech companies in the New York metropolitan area
  - List of television shows filmed in New York City
  - List of television shows set in New York City
  - List of terrorist incidents in New York City
  - List of The Real Housewives of New York City episodes
  - List of ticker-tape parades in New York City
  - List of Tony Awards ceremonies
  - List of tree species in New York City
  - List of video games set in New York City
  - List of works in the Museum of Modern Art
  - Lists of bus routes in New York City
  - Lists of companies listed on the New York Stock Exchange
  - Lists of crossings of the East River
  - Lists of New York City landmarks
  - Lists of New York City topics
- Little Africa, Manhattan
- Little Brazil, Manhattan
- Little Fuzhou
- Little Germany, Manhattan
- Little Italy, Manhattan
- Little Neck Parkway
- Little Red Lighthouse
- Little Syria, Manhattan
- Livingston, Staten Island
- Locust Manor, Queens
- Locust Point, Bronx
- Long Island
- Long Island City
- Long Island Rail Road
- Longwood, Bronx
- Longwood Historic District (Bronx)
- Lorillard Snuff Mill
- Low Memorial Library
- Lower East Side
- Lower Manhattan
- Ludlow Street (Manhattan)
- LuEsther T. Mertz Library

== M ==
- MacDougal Street
- Madison Avenue
- Madison Square North Historic District
- Madison Square Park Tower
- Madison Street (Manhattan)
- Maiden Lane (Manhattan)
- Maimonides Park
- Main Street (Queens)
- Manhattan
- Manhattan Avenue (Brooklyn)
- Manhattan Avenue (Manhattan)
- Manhattan Avenue–West 120th–123rd Streets Historic District
- Manhattan Beach, Brooklyn
- Manhattan Valley
- Manhattanville, Manhattan
- Manhattan West
- Manor Heights, Staten Island
- Mapleton, Brooklyn
- Marble Hill, Manhattan
- March uptown
- Marine Park (neighborhood), Brooklyn
- Mariners Harbor, Staten Island
- Marketfield Street
- Maspeth, Queens
- Matthew Henson Residence
- Mayor of New York City
- McDonald Avenue
- McGuinness Boulevard
- Meadowmere, Queens
- Meatpacking District, Manhattan
- Media in New York City
- Meiers Corners, Staten Island
- Melrose, Bronx
- Mercer Street (Manhattan)
- Merrick Road
- Met Gala
- MetLife Building
- Metrograph
- Metro-North Railroad
- Metropolitan Avenue
- Metropolitan Baptist Church (New York City)
- Metropolitan Transportation Authority
- Mid-Island, Staten Island
- Middle Village, Queens
- Midland Beach, Staten Island
- Midtown Manhattan
- Midtown South
- Midwood, Brooklyn
- Milbank, Brinckerhoff, and Fiske Halls
- Mill Basin, Brooklyn
- Minnesota Strip
- Minton's Playhouse
- Morningside Drive (Manhattan)
- Morningside Heights
- Morris Heights, Bronx
- Morris High School Historic District
- Morris Park, Bronx
- Morris Park station
- Morris–Jumel Mansion
- Morrisania, Bronx
- Mosholu Parkway
- Mott Haven, Bronx
- Mott Street
- Mount Morris Bank Building
- Mount Morris Park Historic District
- Mount Sinai Morningside
- Moving Day (New York City)
- MTA Regional Bus Operations
- Mulberry Street (Manhattan)
- Murray Hill, Manhattan
- Museum of Modern Art
- Museum of the Moving Image
- Music of New York City
- Myrtle Avenue

== N ==
- Nassau Street (Manhattan)
- National Register of Historic Places listings in Brooklyn
- National Register of Historic Places listings in Manhattan
- National Register of Historic Places listings in Manhattan above 110th Street
- National Register of Historic Places listings in Manhattan below 14th Street
- National Register of Historic Places listings in Manhattan from 14th to 59th Streets
- National Register of Historic Places listings in Manhattan from 59th to 110th Streets
- National Register of Historic Places listings in Manhattan on islands
- National Register of Historic Places listings in New York City
- National Register of Historic Places listings in Queens, New York
- National Register of Historic Places listings in Staten Island
- National Register of Historic Places listings in the Bronx
- Neighborhood rebranding in New York City
- Neighborhoods in New York City
- Neponsit, Queens
- New Amsterdam
- New Brighton, Staten Island
- New Dorp, Staten Island
- New Dorp Beach
- New Springville, Staten Island
- New Utrecht, Brooklyn
- New York (state)
- New York accent
- New York Amsterdam News Building
- New York Botanical Garden
- New York City
- New York City: the 51st State
- New York City arts organizations
- New York City Board of Transportation
- New York City Comptroller
- New York City Council
- New York City Department of Education
- New York City Department of Health and Mental Hygiene
- New York City Department of Parks and Recreation
- New York City Department of Transportation
- New York City directories
- New York City Drag March
- New York City Emergency Management
- New York City English
- New York City ethnic enclaves
- New York City FC
- New York City Fire Commissioner
- New York City Fire Department
- New York City Hall
- New York City Housing Authority
- New York City in the American Civil War
- New York City Landmarks Preservation Commission
- New York City Marathon
- New York City mayoral elections
- New York City Police Commissioner
- New York City Police Department
- New York City Subway
- New York City Subway map
- New York City water supply system
- New York Fashion Week
- New York Harbor
- New York metropolitan area
- New York Public Library
- New York Public Library in popular culture
- New York Public Library Main Branch
- New York State Route 9X
- New York State Route 24
- New York State Route 25
- New York State Route 25A
- New York State Route 25B
- New York State Route 25D
- New York State Route 27
- New York State Route 895
- New York Stock Exchange
- New York–style pizza
- New York Vauxhall Gardens
- New Yorkers in journalism
- Newark Liberty International Airport
- News Corp
- News Corporation
- Nicknames of New York City
- Ninth Avenue (Manhattan)
- Nitehawk Cinema
- NoHo, Manhattan
- Nolita
- NoMad, Manhattan
- North Bronx
- North Moore Street
- North Presbyterian Church (Manhattan)
- North Riverdale, Bronx
- North Shore, Staten Island
- Norwood, Bronx
- Nostrand Avenue
- NYC Health + Hospitals
- NYC Pride March

== O ==
- Oakwood, Staten Island
- Ocean Avenue (Brooklyn)
- Ocean Hill, Brooklyn
- Ocean Parkway (Brooklyn)
- Old Broadway Synagogue
- Old Place, Staten Island
- Old Town, Staten Island
- Oliver D. Filley House
- One57
- One Astor Plaza
- One Liberty Plaza
- One Manhattan Square
- One Penn Plaza
- One Vanderbilt
- One World Trade Center
- One Worldwide Plaza
- Orchard Street
- Outline of New York City
- Ozone Park, Queens

== P ==
- P.S. 157
- Pacific Park, Brooklyn
- Paris Theater (Manhattan)
- Park and Tilford Building (Lenox Avenue)
- Park and Tilford Building (72nd Street)
- Park Avenue
- Park Plaza Apartments (Bronx)
- Park Row (Manhattan)
- Park Slope
- Parkchester, Bronx
- Parsons Boulevard
- Patchin Place
- PATH (rail system)
- Pearl Street (Manhattan)
- Pelham Bay (neighborhood), Bronx
- Pelham Bay Park
- Pelham Gardens, Bronx
- Pelham Parkway
- Pelham Parkway (neighborhood), Bronx
- Pelham Parkway station (IRT White Plains Road Line)
- Pelham Road
- Pennsylvania Avenue (Brooklyn)
- Pennsylvania Station (New York City)
- Percy R. Pyne House
- Pershing Square, Manhattan
- Philosophy Hall
- Phipps Garden Apartments
- Plaza Lafayette
- Pleasant Avenue
- Pleasant Plains, Staten Island
- Plumb Beach, Brooklyn
- Plymouth Church (Brooklyn)
- Police surveillance in New York City
- Politics of New York City
- Pomander Walk
- Pomonok, Queens
- Port Authority of New York and New Jersey
- Port Ivory, Staten Island
- Port Morris, Bronx
- Port Morris Ferry Bridges
- Port of New York and New Jersey
- Port Richmond, Staten Island
- Prince's Bay, Staten Island
- Prospect Avenue (Brooklyn)
- Prospect Avenue station (IRT White Plains Road Line)
- Prospect Heights, Brooklyn
- Prospect Lefferts Gardens
- Prospect Park (Brooklyn)
- Prospect Park South
- Prospect Park Zoo
- PS 11 (Bronx)
- Public School 15
- Public School 17
- Puerto Ricans in New York City
- Pupin Hall

== Q ==
- Quad Cinema
- Queens
- Queens Boulevard
- Queens directories
- Queens Liberation Front
- Queens Plaza Park
- Queens Pride Parade
- Queens Public Library
- Queens Village, Queens
- Queens Zoo
- Queensbridge Houses

== R ==
- Radio Row
- Rainey Memorial Gates
- Randall Manor, Staten Island
- Randalls and Wards Islands
- Rats in New York City
- Red Hook, Brooklyn
- Red Hook Lane Arresick
- Rego Park, Queens
- Richmond Avenue
- Richmond Hill, Queens
- Richmond Road (Staten Island)
- Richmond Valley, Staten Island
- Richmondtown, Staten Island
- Ridgewood, Queens
- Riverdale, Bronx
- Riverdale Monument
- Riverdale Presbyterian Church Complex
- Riverside Church
- Riverside Drive (Manhattan)
- Riverside Park (Manhattan)
- Riverside South, Manhattan
- Rivington Street
- Robert Colgate House
- Rochdale Village, Queens
- Rockaway, Queens
- Rockaway Beach Boulevard
- Rockaway Boulevard
- Rockaway Freeway
- Rockaway Park, Queens
- Rockaway Parkway
- Rockefeller Center
- Rockefeller Center Christmas Tree
- Roosevelt Island
- Roosevelt Street
- Rose Hill, Manhattan
- Rosebank, Staten Island
- Rosedale, Queens
- Rossville, Staten Island
- Russian Americans in New York City

== S ==
- San Juan Hill, Manhattan
- Schuylerville, Bronx
- Seal of New York City
- Second Avenue (Manhattan)
- Sedgwick Avenue
- Seneca Village
- September 11 attacks
- Sesame Street (fictional location)
- Seventh Avenue (Manhattan)
- Seventh Regiment Armory
- Sheepshead Bay, Brooklyn
- Sheffield Farms Stable
- Shore Acres, Staten Island
- Shore Front Parkway
- Shubert Alley
- Silicon Alley
- Silver Lake, Staten Island
- Simpson Street station
- Sixth Avenue
- Sixth borough
- Skyline Tower (Queens)
- Smallpox Hospital
- Soccer in the New York metropolitan area
- Soundview, Bronx
- South Beach, Staten Island
- South Bronx
- South Brooklyn
- South Jamaica, Queens
- South Ozone Park, Queens
- South Shore, Staten Island
- South Slope, Brooklyn
- South Street (Manhattan)
- South Street Seaport
- South Village
- Southern Boulevard (Bronx)
- Spanish Americans in New York City
- Spanish Camp
- Spectacle Theater
- Sports in the New York metropolitan area
- Spring Creek, Brooklyn
- Spring Street (Manhattan)
- Springfield Boulevard
- Springfield Gardens, Queens
- Spruce Street
- Spuyten Duyvil, Bronx
- Squadron A Armory
- St. Albans, Queens
- St. Andrew's Episcopal Church (New York City)
- St. Ann's Episcopal Church (Bronx)
- St. George, Staten Island
- St. James' Episcopal Church and Parish House
- St. Nicholas Avenue
- St. Nicholas Historic District
- St. Patrick's Cathedral (Midtown Manhattan)
- St. Peter's Church, Chapel and Cemetery Complex
- St. Philip's Episcopal Church (Manhattan)
- St. Stephen's Methodist Church
- St. Walburga's Academy
- Stanton Street
- Stapleton Heights, Staten Island
- Starrett City, Brooklyn
- State Street (Manhattan)
- Staten Island
- Staten Island Ferry
- Staten Island Greenbelt
- Staten Island Railway
- Staten Island Zoo
- Statue of Liberty
- Statue of Liberty National Monument
- Steinway Street
- Stillwell Avenue
- Stone Street (Manhattan)
- Stonewall riots
- Strecker Memorial Laboratory
- Street signs in New York City
- Studio 54
- Stuyvesant Square
- Stuyvesant Street
- Stuyvesant Town–Peter Cooper Village
- Substation 219
- Sugar Hill, Manhattan
- Sunnyside, Queens
- Sunnyside, Staten Island
- Sunnyside Gardens, Queens
- Sunnyslope (Bronx)
- Sunset Park, Brooklyn
- Sutphin Boulevard
- Sutton 58
- Sutton Place, Manhattan
- Sylvan Place
- Symphony Space

== T ==
- T (magazine)
- T Brand Studio
- Tammany Hall
- Taras Shevchenko Place
- Taxis of New York City
- Tech:NYC
- Teleport (Staten Island)
- Tenderloin, Manhattan
- Tenth Avenue (Manhattan)
- The Battery (Manhattan)
- The Bronx
- The Brooklyn Tower
- The City That Never Sleeps (nickname)
- The Eugene
- The Film-Makers' Cooperative
- The Hole, New York City
- The Hub, Bronx
- The New York Times
- The New York Times Book Review
- The New York Times Building
- The New York Times Company
- The New York Times International Edition
- The New York Times Magazine
- The New Yorker
- The Octagon (Roosevelt Island)
- The Spiral (New York City)
- The Wall Street Journal
- Theater District, Manhattan
- Theatre Alley
- Theatre Row (New York City)
- Third Avenue
- Third Avenue (Brooklyn)
- Thirteenth Avenue (Manhattan)
- Thirteenth Avenue (Brooklyn)
- Thompson Street (Manhattan)
- Throggs Neck
- Timeline of Brooklyn
- Timeline of labor in New York City
- Timeline of New York City
- Timeline of Queens
- Timeline of Staten Island
- Timeline of the Bronx
- Times Books
- Times Square
- Times Square Tower
- Todt Hill
- Tompkins Avenue
- Tompkinsville, Staten Island
- Tony Awards
- Tottenville, Staten Island
- Tourism in New York City
- Transportation in New York City
- Travis, Staten Island
- Tremont, Bronx
- Tremont Avenue
- Tremont Baptist Church
- Tribeca
- TriBeCa Productions
- Trump World Tower
- Tudor City
- Turtle Bay, Manhattan
- Two Bridges, Manhattan

== U ==
- Ukrainian Americans in New York City
- Union Grounds
- Union Square, Manhattan
- Union Theological Seminary (New York City)
- Union Turnpike (New York)
- Unisphere
- United States Post Office (Inwood Station)
- United States Post Office (Morrisania, Bronx)
- United Workers Cooperatives
- University Heights, Bronx
- University Place (Manhattan)
- Unused New York City Subway service labels
- Upper East Side
- Upper Manhattan
- Upper West Side
- Utica Avenue
- Utopia Parkway (Queens)

== V ==
- Valentine–Varian House
- Van Cortlandt House Museum
- Van Cortlandt Park
- Van Cortlandt Park–242nd Street station
- Van Cortlandt Village
- Van Nest, Bronx
- Vandam Street
- Vanderbilt Avenue
- Varick Street
- Vesey Street
- VIA 57 West
- Victorian Flatbush
- Victory Boulevard (Staten Island)
- Village East by Angelika
- Vinegar Hill, Brooklyn
- Vision Zero (New York City)

== W ==
- Wakefield, Bronx
- Wall Street
- Wallabout, Brooklyn
- Ward Hill, Staten Island
- Washington Bridge
- Washington Heights, Manhattan
- Washington Mews
- Washington Park (baseball)
- Washington Street (Manhattan)
- Waterside Plaza
- Wave Hill
- Waverly Place
- Webster Avenue
- Weehawken Street
- West 147th–149th Streets Historic District
- West Broadway
- West Bronx
- West Farms, Bronx
- West Midwood, Brooklyn
- West New Brighton, Staten Island
- West Shore, Staten Island
- West Side (Manhattan)
- West Side Highway
- West Village
- Westchester Avenue
- Westchester Square, Bronx
- Westchester Square–East Tremont Avenue station
- Westerleigh, Staten Island
- White Plains Road
- Whitehall Street
- Whitestone, Queens
- Will Marion Cook House
- Willets Point, Queens
- William E. Dodge House
- William Sloane House
- William Street (Manhattan)
- Williamsbridge, Bronx
- Williamsbridge Oval
- Williamsburg, Brooklyn
- Willowbrook, Staten Island
- Windsor Terrace, Brooklyn
- Wingate, Brooklyn
- Wirecutter (website)
- Women's rights historic sites in New York City
- Woodhaven, Queens
- Woodhaven and Cross Bay Boulevards
- Woodlawn Cemetery (Bronx, New York)
- Woodlawn Heights, Bronx
- Woodlawn station (IRT Jerome Avenue Line)
- Woodrow, Staten Island
- Woodside, Queens
- Woolworth Building
- Wooster Street (Manhattan)
- Wordle
- World Trade Center (1973–2001)
- World Trade Center (2001–present)
- World Trade Center site
- Worth Street
- WQXR-FM
- Wyckoff Heights, New York

== X ==
- Xanga

== Y ==
- Yiddish Theatre District
- York Avenue
- Yorkville, Manhattan

== Z ==
- Ziegfeld Theatre (1969)

== See also ==
- Outline of New York City
- Lists of New York City topics
