= Lists of companies by stock exchange listing =

This page lists company lists ordered by the stock exchange the companies are listed on.

== List ==
- List of companies listed on the Athens Stock Exchange
- List of companies listed on the Barbados Stock Exchange
- List of companies listed on the Beirut Stock Exchange
- List of companies listed on the Colombo Stock Exchange
- List of companies listed on the Hong Kong Stock Exchange
- List of companies listed on Ibovespa
- List of companies listed on the Irish Stock Exchange
- Companies listed on the Istanbul Stock Exchange
- List of companies listed on the London Stock Exchange

- FTSE 100 Index
- FTSE 250 Index
- FTSE SmallCap Index

- List of companies listed on the Mongolian Stock Exchange
- NASDAQ-100#Components
- List of companies listed on the National Stock Exchange of India
- Lists of companies listed on the New York Stock Exchange
- Companies listed on the New York Stock Exchange (0–9)
- Companies listed on the New York Stock Exchange (A)
- Companies listed on the New York Stock Exchange (B)
- Companies listed on the New York Stock Exchange (C)
- Companies listed on the New York Stock Exchange (D)
- Companies listed on the New York Stock Exchange (E)
- Companies listed on the New York Stock Exchange (F)
- Companies listed on the New York Stock Exchange (G)
- Companies listed on the New York Stock Exchange (H)
- Companies listed on the New York Stock Exchange (I)
- Companies listed on the New York Stock Exchange (J)
- Companies listed on the New York Stock Exchange (K)
- Companies listed on the New York Stock Exchange (L)
- Companies listed on the New York Stock Exchange (M)
- Companies listed on the New York Stock Exchange (N)
- Companies listed on the New York Stock Exchange (O)
- Companies listed on the New York Stock Exchange (P)
- Companies listed on the New York Stock Exchange (Q)
- Companies listed on the New York Stock Exchange (R)
- Companies listed on the New York Stock Exchange (S)
- Companies listed on the New York Stock Exchange (T)
- Companies listed on the New York Stock Exchange (U)
- Companies listed on the New York Stock Exchange (V)
- Companies listed on the New York Stock Exchange (W)
- Companies listed on the New York Stock Exchange (X)
- Companies listed on the New York Stock Exchange (Y)
- Companies listed on the New York Stock Exchange (Z)
- List of companies listed on the Oslo Stock Exchange
- Companies listed on the Shenzhen Stock Exchange
- Companies listed on the Singapore Exchange
- List of members of the Tokyo Stock Exchange
- Lists of companies listed on the Toronto Stock Exchange
- Companies listed on the Toronto Stock Exchange (0–9)
- Companies listed on the Toronto Stock Exchange (A)
- Companies listed on the Toronto Stock Exchange (B)
- Companies listed on the Toronto Stock Exchange (C)
- Companies listed on the Toronto Stock Exchange (D)
- Companies listed on the Toronto Stock Exchange (E)
- Companies listed on the Toronto Stock Exchange (F)
- Companies listed on the Toronto Stock Exchange (G)
- Companies listed on the Toronto Stock Exchange (H)
- Companies listed on the Toronto Stock Exchange (I)
- Companies listed on the Toronto Stock Exchange (J)
- Companies listed on the Toronto Stock Exchange (K)
- Companies listed on the Toronto Stock Exchange (L)
- Companies listed on the Toronto Stock Exchange (M)
- Companies listed on the Toronto Stock Exchange (N)
- Companies listed on the Toronto Stock Exchange (O)
- Companies listed on the Toronto Stock Exchange (P)
- Companies listed on the Toronto Stock Exchange (Q)
- Companies listed on the Toronto Stock Exchange (R)
- Companies listed on the Toronto Stock Exchange (S)
- Companies listed on the Toronto Stock Exchange (T)
- Companies listed on the Toronto Stock Exchange (U)
- Companies listed on the Toronto Stock Exchange (V)
- Companies listed on the Toronto Stock Exchange (W)
- Companies listed on the Toronto Stock Exchange (X)
- Companies listed on the Toronto Stock Exchange (Y)
- Companies listed on the Toronto Stock Exchange (Z)
