= Lists of New York City topics =

The following is a list of topics related to New York City, New York, United States.

== Architecture ==
Lists dealing with architecture:

- List of bridges and tunnels in New York City
  - Newtown Creek bridges
- List of full-block structures in New York City
- List of tallest buildings in New York City

== Culture ==
Lists of:

- Books on New York City
- Books set in New York City
- Movies set in New York City
- Museums and cultural institutions
- Newspapers and magazines
- People from New York City
  - People from Brooklyn
  - People from the Bronx
  - List of people from Staten Island
  - Notable burials at Woodlawn Cemetery
- Songs about New York City
- Sports teams
- Television and Film studios
- Television shows set in New York City
- Video games set in New York City

== Economy ==
- Assets owned by the New York Times Company
- Major corporations

== Education ==
- Colleges and universities
- High schools

== Geography ==
Neighborhoods:

- Bronx neighborhoods
- Brooklyn neighborhoods
- Manhattan neighborhoods
- Queens neighborhoods
- Staten Island neighborhoods

Streets:

- Streets in the Bronx (category)
- Streets in Brooklyn (category)
- Streets in Manhattan (category)
- Streets in New York City (category)

Other:

- Minor islands

== History and politics ==
Lists of:

- Borough Presidents
  - Borough Presidents (lists)
  - Borough presidents (category)
- City Comptrollers since 1898
- City Council (Board of Aldermen before 1938):
  - Presiding Officers since 1898
  - Present City Council membership
  - Present and Historical City Council membership (category)
- Fire Commissioners
- Community Districts
  - Community boards of the Bronx
  - Community boards of Brooklyn
  - Community boards of Manhattan
  - Community boards of Queens
  - Community boards of Staten Island
- Gang members (1825-1920)
- Health Commissioners (1870 to the present)
- Mayors and mayoral elections
  - Mayors of the City of Brooklyn (1834–1897)
  - Mayors of New York City (listed from 1664 to the present)
  - Mayoral elections (since 1897)
  - New York City: the 51st State (1969 Mailer-Breslin candidacy)
  - Mayors of Brooklyn (category)
  - Mayors of New York City (category)
- Police Commissioners
- Timeline of New York City history
  - Timeline of the Bronx
  - Timeline of Brooklyn
  - Timeline of Queens
  - Timeline of Staten Island
- Timeline of New York City crimes and disasters
- State government:
  - Governors
  - Members of the State Assembly
  - Members of the State Senate

== Tourism, recreation, and landmarks ==
Lists of:

- Beaches
- Hotels
- Gardens
- Parks
- Prisons (category)

== Transportation ==
Lists of:

- Airports in and around New York City
- Metropolitan Transportation Authority (category)
- Subway inter-division connections
- Subway inter-division transfers
- Subway lines
- Subway R-type contracts
- Subway services
- Subway stations
- Subway terminals
- Subway yards
- Transportation in New York City (category)
