= Lisanti =

Lisanti is a surname. Notable people with the surname include:

- Mariangela Lisanti (born 1983), American theoretical physicist
- Mary Ann Lisanti (born 1967), American politician
- Michelle Poteet Lisanti (fl. 1980–2011), American television soap opera writer

== See also ==
- Lisanti Chapel
