= Index of New York-related articles =

Index of New York-related articles may refer to:

- Index of New York (state)–related articles
- Index of New York City-related articles
