= Neighborhood rebranding in New York City =

Neighborhood rebranding in New York City has been a constant phenomenon for decades as real estate promoters, community groups, and residents all sometimes rename communities to increase prestige and distance themselves from an older negative reputation.

== Examples ==
Several neighborhoods were rebranded after the Civil War when slightly tawdry neighborhoods like Harsonville, centered on what is now Broadway about 68th Street, were reclassified as part of suburban Bloomingdale farther up Bloomingdale Road, which itself was rebranded as "The Boulevard". What is now the Upper West Side was meant to be named the "West End" to lure an Anglophile upper class; however, that designation was not accepted.

After World War II, the name of the small and fashionable hill that had been known as Murray Hill was applied to the featureless area to its east.

The neighborhood of SoHo, Manhattan, which stands for South of Houston Street, is deliberately imitative of Soho in London. TriBeCa, another rebranding, applied to the more southerly part of the former Lower West Side stands for Triangle Below Canal Street. The use of acronym and medial capitals has been influential in adjacent neighborhoods trying to pick up on SoHo's cachet. The most obvious inspiration is NoHo, located North of Houston Street, and NoLIta, North of Little Italy. Other attempts of upscale rebrandings failed, especially in "Clinton", which residents continue to call "Hell's Kitchen". Some rebrandings, such as SoHa (South of Harlem) for Morningside Heights and south Harlem, have been controversial.

The trend has also spread beyond Manhattan. The former Pigtown, Brooklyn became Wingate, Brooklyn early in the 20th century. At mid-century, the prosperous portions of South Brooklyn north of Gowanus Expressway and west of Gowanus Canal successfully dissociated themselves from Red Hook and became known by several local names. Late in the century the term BoCoCa was applied with less success by the medial capital method to encompass these neighborhoods of Boerum Hill, Cobble Hill, and Carroll Gardens. The more successful Dumbo, in Downtown Brooklyn, stands for Down Under the Manhattan Bridge Overpass. DoBro is a recently created name describing the Downtown Brooklyn business district along Fulton Street.

The Riverdale section of the Bronx is sometimes called NoMa (North of Manhattan). In the Port Morris section of the South Bronx, many brokers and new residents call it SoBro (South Bronx) with limited success; it was renamed in order to eliminate the negative stereotypes of the South Bronx, but many older residents continue to call it the South Bronx. Efforts to change to "Downtown Bronx" have been even less successful. In 2015 developers tried to rebrand a portion of the South Bronx as the Piano District, a reference to the piano factories were located in the area a century earlier.

== Proposed legislation ==
In April 2011, New York State Assemblyman Hakeem Jeffries promised to introduce a bill to require a series of approvals for new neighborhood names — from the community board, the City Council and the mayor. The bill would also punish real estate brokers who promoted property with an unofficial, made-up name. The bill calls for fines and the possible suspension or revocation of brokers’ licenses.

== See also ==
- Gentrification in New York City
