= Vaalco Energy =

VAALCO Energy, Inc.
- Company type: Public company
- Traded as: NYSE: EGY; Russell Microcap Index component
- Industry: Petroleum industry
- Founded: 1985; 41 years ago
- Headquarters: Houston, Texas, United States
- Key people: George W.M. Maxwell, CEO; Andrew L. Fawthrop, Chairman; Ron Bain, CFO
- Products: Petroleum
- Production output: 2.6 thousand barrels of oil equivalent (16,000 GJ) per day (2021)
- Revenue: ▲$199 million (2021)
- Net income: ▲$81 million (2021)
- Total assets: ▲$263 million (2021)
- Total equity: ▲$144 million (2021)
- Number of employees: 117, including 80 in Gabon (2021)
- Website: www.vaalco.com

VAALCO Energy is a company engaged in hydrocarbon exploration. It is organized in Delaware and headquartered in Houston, Texas with operations primarily in the Etame Marin block offshore Gabon.

As of December 31, 2021, the company had 11.218 million barrels of oil equivalent (68,630,000 GJ) of proved reserves, all of which was petroleum.

The company’s primary source of revenue is from its 58.8% interest, via a production sharing contract, in operations in the 750,000 acre (3,000 km^{2}) Etame Marin block, offshore Gabon. The company also owns a 45.9% working interest in an undeveloped portion of a block offshore Equatorial Guinea.

== History ==
In 2000, the company sold a 32.5% interest in the Etame Marin permit offshore Gabon to PanAfrican Energy Corp.

In November 2012, the company acquired a 31% non-operating working interest in a production and development area offshore Equatorial Guinea from Petronas for $10 million.

In November 2016, the company acquired an additional 3.23% participating interest (2.98% working interest) in the Etame Marin permit offshore Gabon.

In December 2016, Cary Bounds was named chief executive officer of the company.
