= Companies listed on the New York Stock Exchange (V) =

== V ==
Stock name	Symbol	Country of origin
V.F. Corporation	VFC	United States
V2X, Inc.	VVX	United States
Vaalco Energy, Inc.	EGY	United States
Vail Resorts, Inc.	MTN	United States
Valaris Limited	VAL	Bermuda
Vale S.A.	VALE	Brazil
Valens Semiconductor Ltd.	VLN	Israel
Valero Energy Corporation	VLO	United States
Valhi, Inc.	VHI	United States
Valmont Industries, Inc.	VMI	United States
Valvoline Inc.	VVV	United States
Vapotherm, Inc.	VAPO	United States
Vector Group Ltd.	VGR	United States
Veeva Systems Inc.	VEEV	United States
Velo3D, Inc.	VLD	United States
Velocity Financial, Inc.	VEL	United States
Ventas, Inc.	VTR	United States
Veris Residential, Inc.	VRE	United States
Veritiv Corporation	VRTV	United States
Verizon Communications Inc.	VZ	United States
Vermilion Energy Inc.	VET	Canada
Vertical Aerospace Ltd.	EVTL	United Kingdom
Vertiv Holdings Co	VRT	United States
VIA optronics AG	VIAO	Germany
Viad Corp	VVI	United States
Vicarious Surgical Inc.	RBOT	United States
Vici Properties Inc.	VICI	United States
Victoria's Secret & Co.	VSXY	United States
Vince Holding Corp.	VNCE	United States
Vipshop Holdings Limited	VIPS	China
Virgin Galactic Holdings, Inc.	SPCE	United States
VirnetX Holding Corporation	VHC	United States
Virtus Artificial Intelligence & Technology Opportunities Fund	AIO	United States
Virtus Convertible & Income 2024 Target Term Fund	CBH	United States
Virtus Convertible & Income Fund	NCV	United States
Virtus Convertible & Income Fund	NCV.PRA	United States
Virtus Convertible & Income Fund II	NCZ	United States
Virtus Convertible & Income Fund II	NCZ.PRA	United States
Virtus Diversified Income & Convertible Fund	ACV	United States
Virtus Dividend, Interest & Premium Strategy Fund	NFJ	United States
Virtus Equity & Convertible Income Fund	NIE	United States
Virtus Global Multi-Sector Income Fund	VGI	United States
Virtus Stone Harbor Emerging Markets Income Fund	EDF	United States
Virtus Stone Harbor Emerging Markets Total Income Fund	EDI	United States
Virtus Global Dividend & Income Fund Inc.	ZTR	United States
Visa Inc.	V	United States
Vishay Intertechnology, Inc.	VSH	United States
Vishay Precision Group, Inc.	VPG	United States
Vista Energy, S.A.B. de C.V.	VIST	Mexico
Vista Outdoor Inc.	VSTO	United States
Vistra Corp.	VST	United States
Vasta Platform Limited	VSTA	Brazil
Vital Energy, Inc.	VTLE	United States
Vitesse Energy, Inc.	VTS	United States
Vizio Holding Corp.	VZIO	United States
VMware, Inc.	VMW	United States
VOC Energy Trust	VOC	United States
Vontier Corporation	VNT	United States
Vornado Realty Trust	VNO	United States
Vornado Realty Trust	VNO.PRO	United States
Vornado Realty Trust	VNO.PRM	United States
Vornado Realty Trust	VNO.PRN	United States
Vornado Realty Trust	VNO.PRL	United States
Voya Asia Pacific High Dividend Equity Income Fund	IAE	United States
Voya Emerging Markets High Dividend Equity Fund	IHD	United States
Voya Financial, Inc.	VOYA	United States
Voya Financial, Inc.	VOYA.PRB	United States
Voya Global Advantage and Premium Opportunity Fund	IGA	United States
Voya Global Equity Dividend and Premium Opportunity Fund	IGD	United States
Voya Infrastructure, Industrials and Materials Fund	IDE	United States
VTEX	VTEX	United Kingdom
Vulcan Materials Company	VMC	United States
