= PS 11 (Bronx) =

- Public School 11
- U.S. National Register of Historic Places
- New York State Register of Historic Places
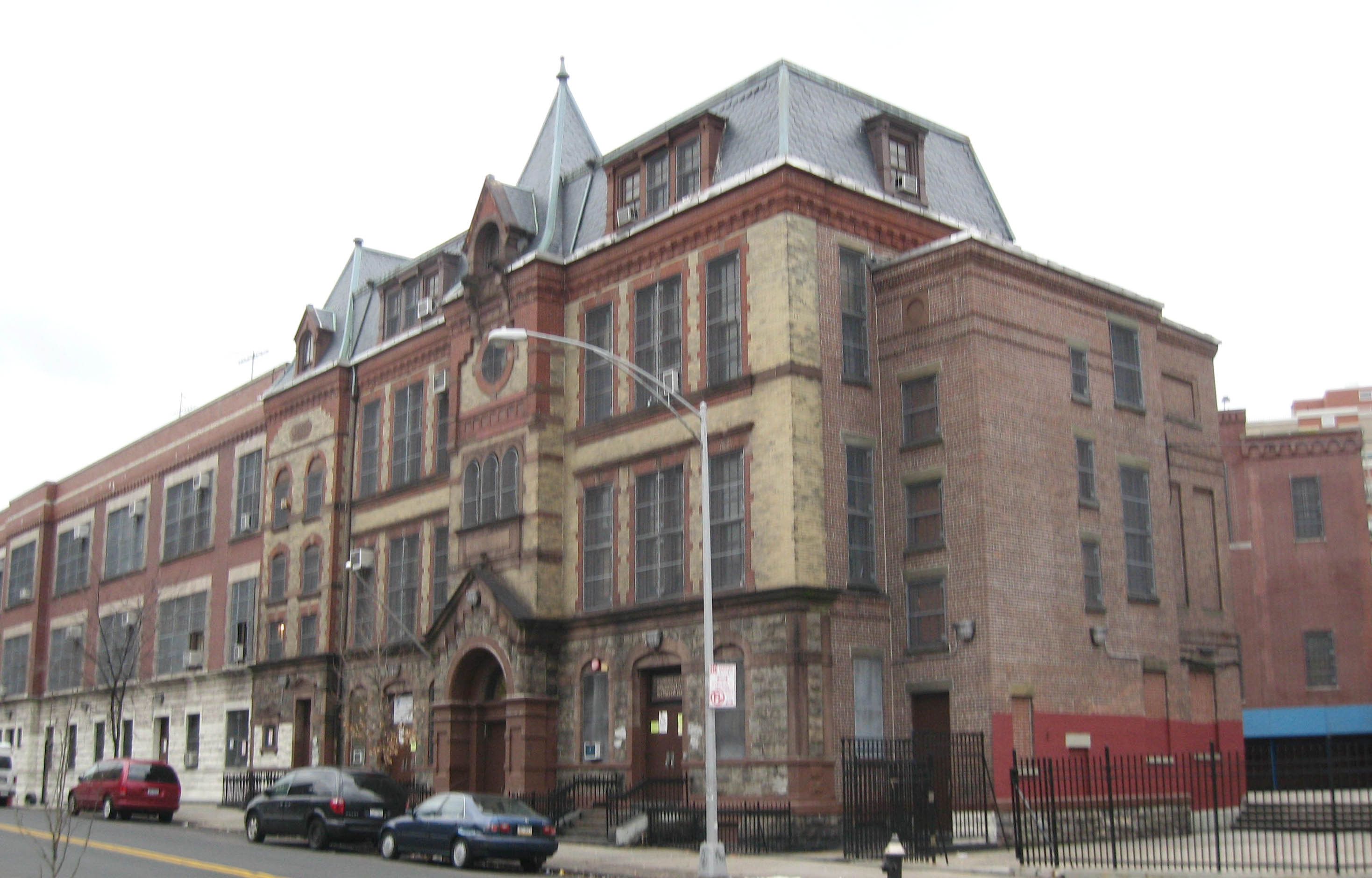
- Public School 11, January 2009

- Location within New York City Location within New York Location within the United States
- Location: 1257 Ogden Avenue, Highbridge, Bronx, The Bronx, New York City
- Coordinates: 40°50′23″N 73°55′35″W
- Area: 1.5 acres (0.61 ha)
- Built: 1889
- Architect: DeBevoise, George W.; C. B. J. Snyder
- Architectural style: Romanesque, Romanesque Revival
- NRHP reference No.: 83001642
- NYSRHP No.: 00501.000731

Significant dates
- Added to NRHP: September 8, 1983
- Designated NYSRHP: August 10, 1983

Public School 11, also known as Highbridge School, is a historic school located in The Bronx, New York City. It is a part of the New York City Department of Education (NYCDOE).

Located in the Highbridge neighborhood, it is a brick and stone building in the Romanesque Revival style. It has three sections: a three-story northern section with tower and rear extension built in 1889; a six-bay, three-story wing built in 1905; and a gymnasium / auditorium built in 1930. The oldest section features a mansard roof. The interior of the auditorium has a mural added in 1937 as part of a Works Progress Administration arts project.

It was listed on the National Register of Historic Places in 1983. It was designated a New York City Landmark in 1981.
