= Boulevard Gardens Apartments =

Apartments in Queens, New York, United States

Coordinates: 40°45′30″N 73°54′22″W

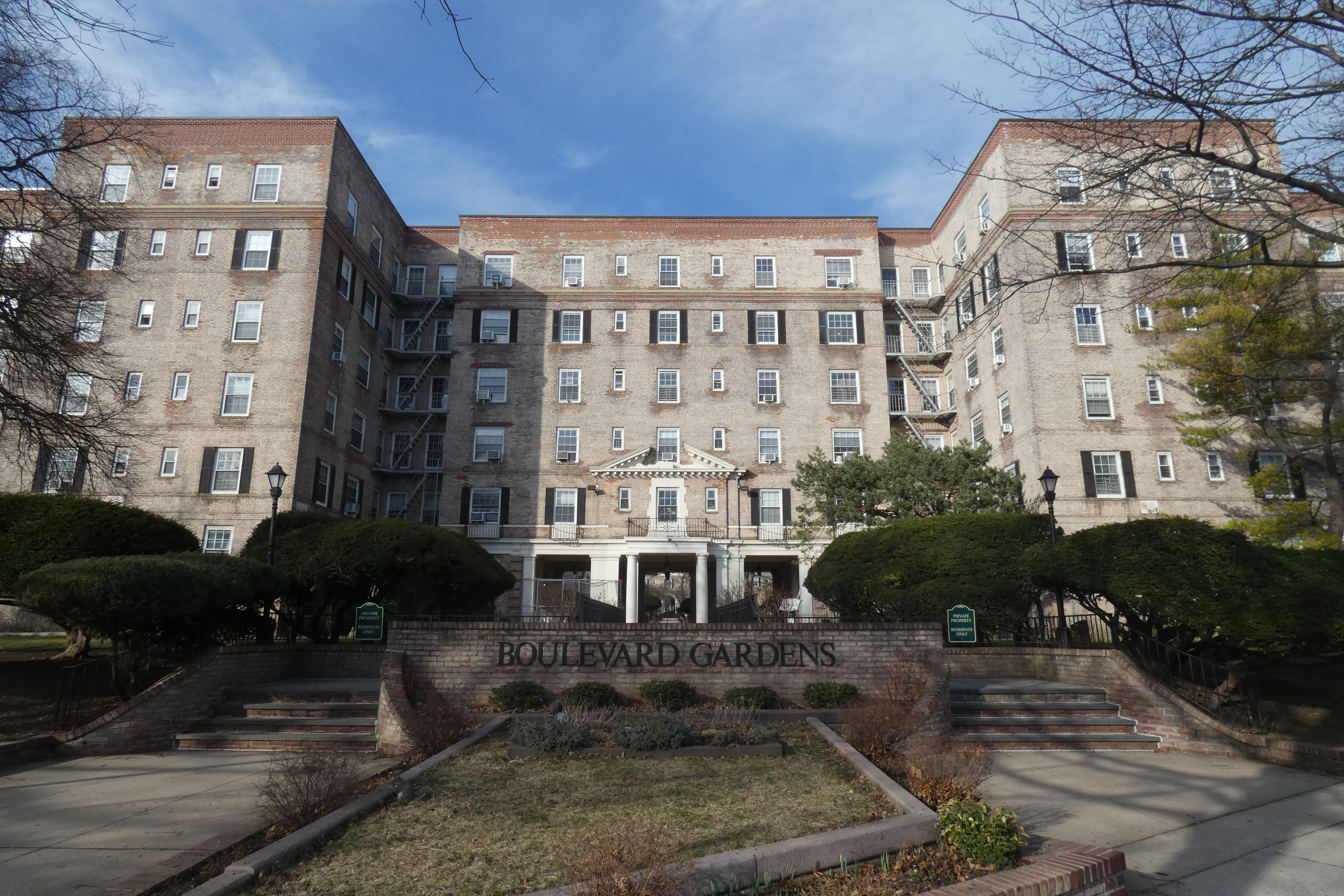
Front view of Boulevard Gardens

The Boulevard Gardens Apartments is a 960-unit apartment complex at 54th Street and 31st Avenue in Woodside, Queens, New York City. It opened in June 1935, during the Great Depression. They were designed by architect Theodore H. Englehardt for the Cord Meyer Development Corporation; the design was based on an apartment complex Elgelhardt designed in Forest Hills.

== History ==
The housing project had ten units which housed 96 families each, or 960 families in all. The buildings were low-rent model tenements with an average rental price of $11 a room. They were completed with a federal loan of $3,450,000 from the Public Works Administration. Construction started in 1933. Boulevard Gardens was one of seven housing developments funded by the PWA through private companies. Despite the success of the program, future funding went only to public housing authorities. By September 1935 the builders, Boulevard Gardens Housing Corporation, reported that all of the units were leased; a year later, the waiting list was reported to be 5,000 families long.

The Dick-Meyer Corporation built a block front of fourteen stores adjacent to the apartments. They were entirely rented by October 1935. The 3,000 inhabitants of the development had easy access to twenty-seven retail stores, a 300 car garage, and a movie theater.

In October 1935 John Volpe, president of the Lower East Side Public Housing Conference, wrote a letter to the editor of The New York Times. He contended that the slum problem was only partially solved by government assistance to projects like Knickerbocker Village, Boulevard Gardens, and Hillside in Queens. The low income group was unable to afford the rent as the prices were not low enough. He offered the example of a New York City Housing Authority project on East 3rd Street in Manhattan. These dwellings were most attractive and were much less expensive.

In May 1936 the majority of the families in the larger buildings paid between $35 and $50 per month for rent. A ruling by the New York State Board of Housing cautioned the Boulevard Gardens Housing Corporation to reserve their accommodations for low income families. Management was advised to gradually eliminate tenants whose annual family incomes exceeded five times their annual rentals. Eleven other housing projects were affected by the action. State board data indicated that 3.8% of families residing at the Boulevard Gardens Apartments had annual incomes of $4,000 or more.

== Design and landscape ==
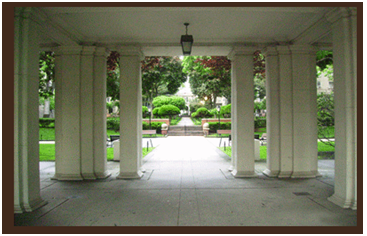
Entryway

The Gardens are a complex of 10 six-story buildings with a total of 960 apartments. The structures cover only 22% of the land, the remainder being reserved for landscaping and playgrounds. Heralded as "A New Idea in Apartment Housing," and as Woodside's "Model Village," the complex won an award for architectural merit from the Queens Chamber of Commerce in 1936.

The main entry leads residents up a set of steps to a formal colonnaded arch. A neo-Georgian entryway characterized by stately Doric columns leads to two open courtyards. Buildings are set back from the sidewalk by raised grassy berms. The interior courtyards contain shade trees like oaks and maples and meandering paths.

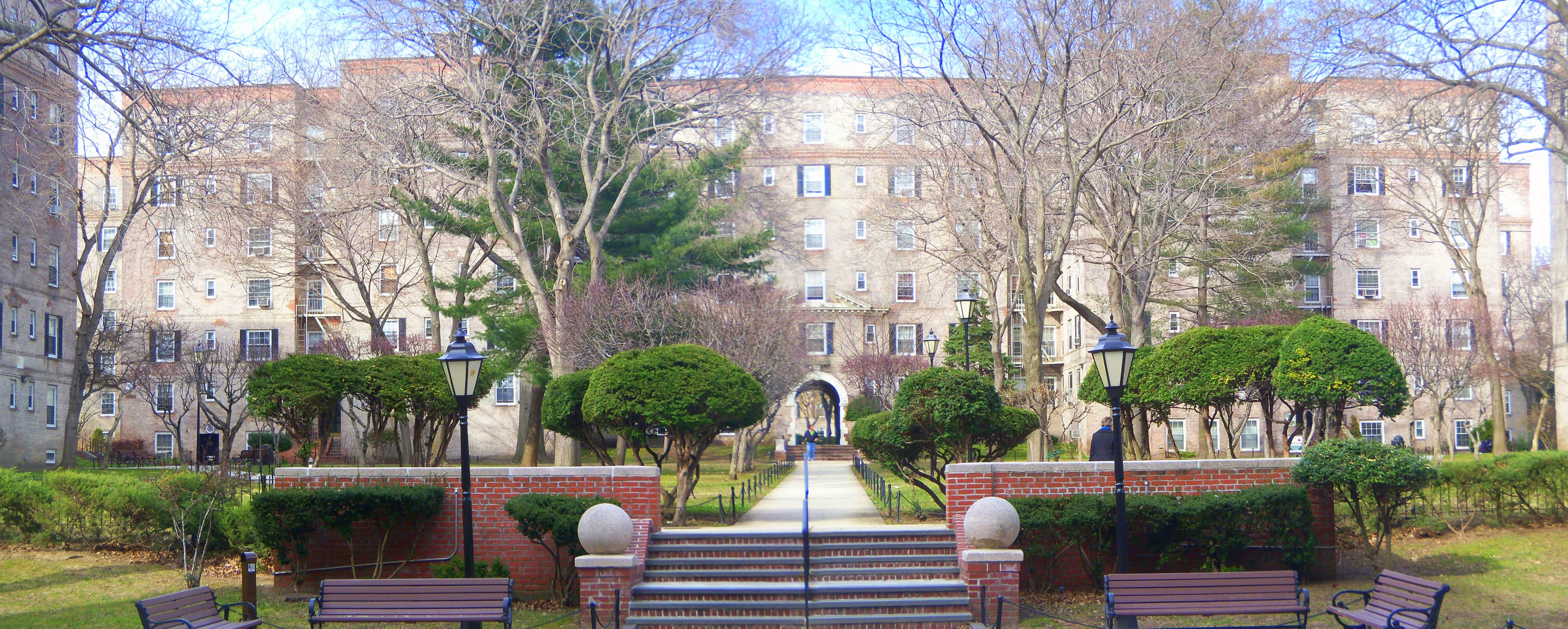
Panorama inside Boulevard Garden Apartment compound

In November 1999 the Boulevard Gardens was a 960-unit co-op encompassing 12 acres (49,000 m^{2}) and 10 buildings with 6 stories each. It is much the same as of 2009.
