= List of companies listed on the London Stock Exchange =

Lists of companies traded on the London Stock Exchange by index:

- Constituents of the FTSE 100 Index
- Constituents of the FTSE 250 Index

== See also ==
- FTSE 350 Index: the FTSE 350 index includes the constituent members of the FTSE 100 and FTSE 250, with the various constituents weighted according to market capitalisation
- FTSE All-Share Index
- Alternative Investment Market
