= National Register of Historic Places listings in New York City =

Listings on the National Register of Historic Places are found in all five counties (boroughs) of New York City.

- National Register of Historic Places listings in Bronx County, New York
- National Register of Historic Places listings in Kings County, New York (Brooklyn)
- National Register of Historic Places listings in New York County, New York (Manhattan)
- National Register of Historic Places listings in Queens County, New York
- National Register of Historic Places listings in Richmond County, New York (Staten Island)
