= UMH Properties =

Coordinates: 40.23520°N 74.27222°W

UMH Properties, Inc.
- Company type: Public company
- Traded as: NYSE: UMH; Russell 2000 Index Component
- Founded: 1968; 58 years ago
- Founder: Eugene W. Landy
- Headquarters: Freehold Township, New Jersey
- Key people: Eugene W. Landy, Chairman; Samuel A. Landy, President & CEO; Anna T. Chew, CFO
- Revenue: ▲$186.1 million (2021)
- Net income: ▲$51.1 million (2021)
- Total assets: ▲$1.3 billion (2021)
- Total equity: ▲$742,000 (2021)
- Number of employees: 430 (2021)
- Website: www.umh.com

UMH Properties, Inc. (formerly United Mobile Homes Inc.) is a public equity real estate investment trust (REIT) that owns and operates a portfolio of 135 manufactured home communities with approximately 25,700 developed homesites. These communities are located in 12 states: New Jersey, New York, Ohio, Pennsylvania, Tennessee, Indiana, Michigan, Maryland, Alabama, South Carolina, Georgia, and Florida. UMH also owns and operates two communities in Florida through its joint venture with Nuveen Real Estate.

== History ==
The company was founded in 1968 by Eugene W. Landy.

In 2006, the company changed its name from United Mobile Homes, Inc. to UMH Properties, Inc.

In 2013, the company acquired Holiday Mobile Village in Nashville, Tennessee for $7.25 million.

In 2014, the company acquired 4 communities in Pennsylvania for $12.2 million and 10 communities in Ohio for $30.4 million

In 2015, the company acquired 6 properties in Ohio, Indiana and Michigan from Sun Communities for $68.6 million and 6 communities in Pennsylvania for $12.6 million.

In 2016, the company acquired 3 properties in Ohio for $7.3 million.

In 2017, the company acquired 6 communities in Pennsylvania for $25.3million, 2 2 communities in Indiana for $24.4 million and a property in Maryland for $4 million.

In 2018, the company acquired 3 communities in Indiana for $24 million, 3 communities in Ohio for $35.1 million.

In 2019, the company acquired 1 community in Ohio for $19.4 million, 2 communities in Pennsylvania for $11.7 million, 1 community in Michigan for $25.2 million.

In 2020, the company acquired 1 community in Pennsylvania for $3.34 million and 1 community in New York for $4.5 million.

In 2021, the company acquired 1 community in Alabama for $4.6 million, 1 community in South Carolina for $3.4 million and 1 community in Ohio for $10.3 million. The company also acquired 1 community in Florida for $22.2 million through its joint venture with Nuveen Real Estate.

In 2022, the company acquired 1 community in Pennsylvania for $5.8 million, 1 community in Pennsylvania for $7.4 million, 1 community in Alabama for $3.9 million, 1 community in Michigan for $39 million, 1 community in South Carolina for $5.2 million, 1 community in Ohio for $19.1 million, and 1 community in New Jersey for $23 million. The company acquired 1 community in Florida for $15.1 million through its joint venture with Nuveen Real Estate.

In 2023, the company acquired 1 community in Georgia for $3.65 million through its qualified opportunity zone fund.
