= Substation 219 =

- U.S. National Register of Historic Places
- New York State Register of Historic Places
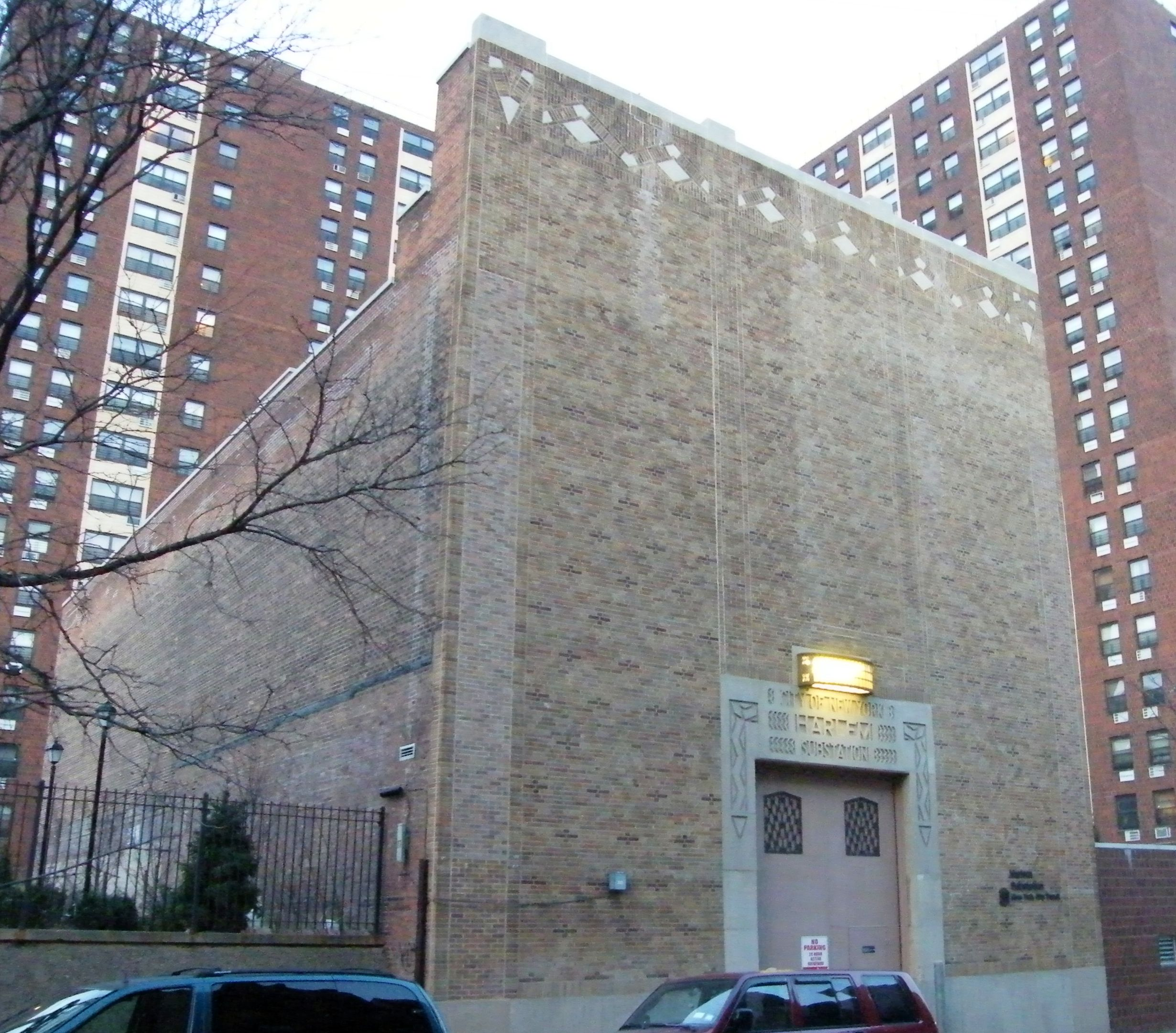
- Substation 219, March 2009

- Location within New York City Location within New York Location within the United States
- Location: 309 W. 133rd St., New York, New York
- Coordinates: 40°48′56″N 73°56′53″W
- Area: less than one acre
- Built: 1932
- Architectural style: Art Deco
- MPS: New York City Subway System MPS
- NRHP reference No.: 06000023
- NYSRHP No.: 06101.007430

Significant dates
- Added to NRHP: February 9, 2006
- Designated NYSRHP: September 19, 2005

Substation 219, also known as the Harlem Substation, is a historic electrical substation located in Harlem, New York, New York. It was constructed by the Independent Subway System in 1932 to provide power to the IND Eighth Avenue Line. It is a single-story, double-height masonry building in the Art Deco style. It features a low brick parapet topped by a band of limestone coping and a limestone frieze consisting of diamond-shaped limestone pieces and a brick chevron pattern. The main entrance doors are faced in aluminium and incorporate Art Deco–style geometric motifs.

It was listed on the National Register of Historic Places in 2006.
