= C. Rieger's Sons Factory =

- U.S. National Register of Historic Places
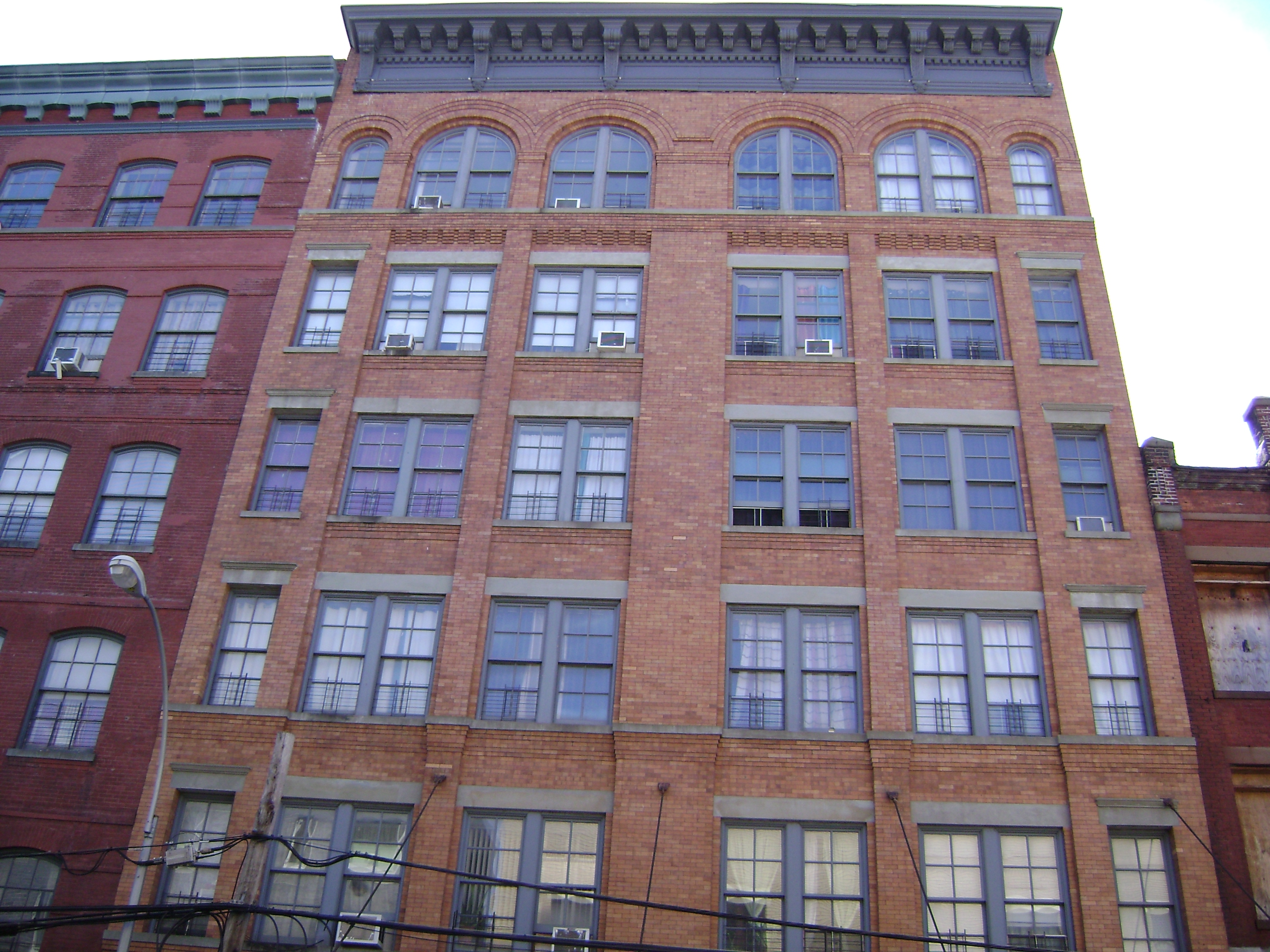

- Location within New York City Location within New York Location within the United States
- Location: 450–452 E. 148th St., Bronx, New York
- Coordinates: 40°48′52″N 73°54′59″W
- Area: less than one acre
- Built: 1906
- Architect: Howell, Harry T.
- Architectural style: Late 19th And Early 20th Century American Movements, Factory Design
- NRHP reference No.: 04000543
- Added to NRHP: May 27, 2004

C. Rieger's Sons Factory, also known as Arden Manufacturing Corporation and Piser Company, is a historic factory building located in the Mott Haven section of the Bronx in New York City. It was built in 1906, and is a six-story building clad in yellow iron spot brick in the Romanesque Revival style. The facade and windows are trimmed in bluestone. It originally housed a furniture manufacturer. It was converted for use as affordable housing during 2002–2003.

It was listed on the National Register of Historic Places in 2004.
