= 48th Police Precinct Station =

- U.S. National Register of Historic Places
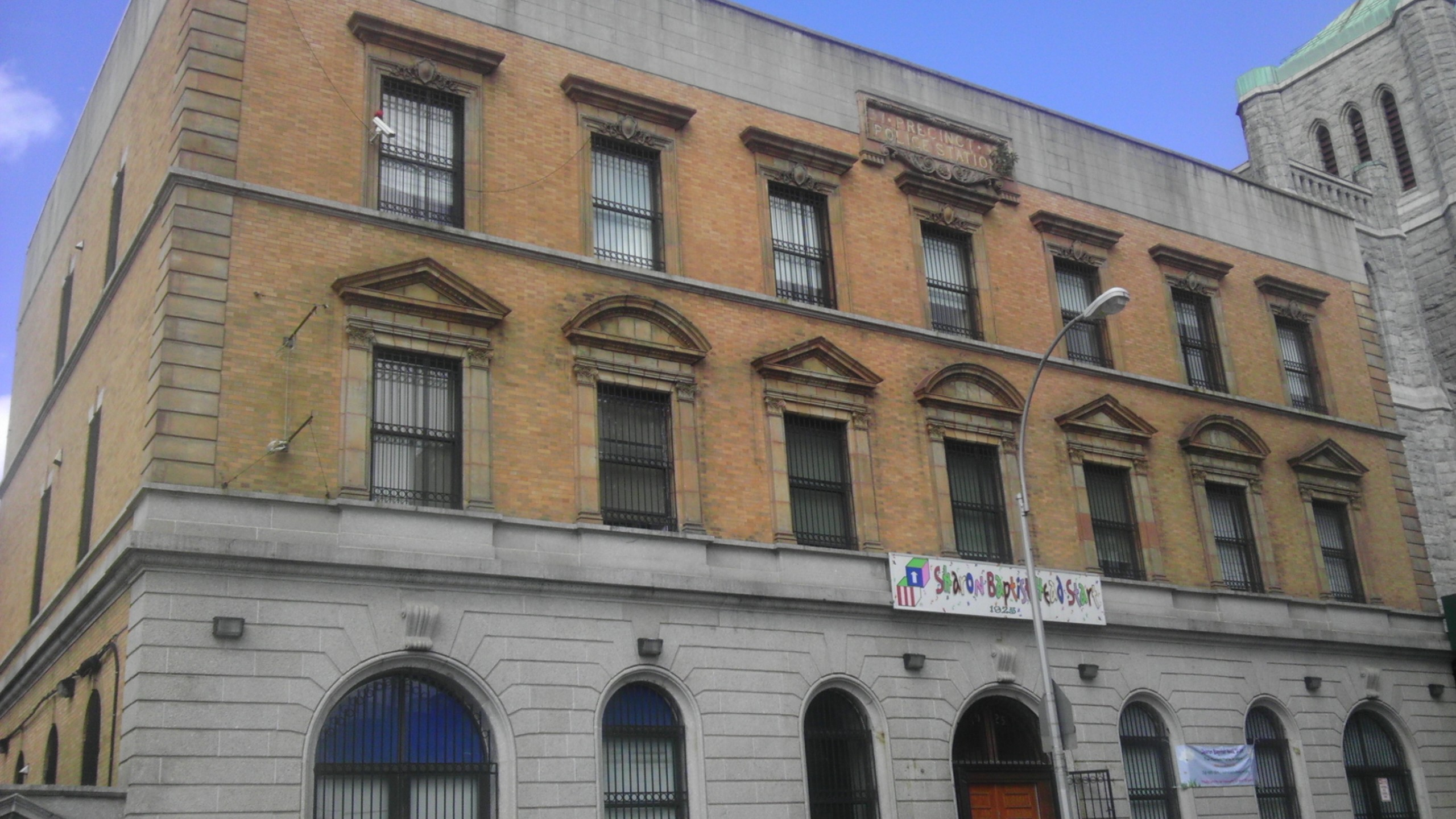

- Location within New York City Location within New York Location within the United States
- Location: 1925 Bathgate Avenue, Bronx, New York 10457, USA
- Coordinates: 40°50′50.4″N 73°53′49.4″W
- Area: less than one acre
- Built: 1901
- Architect: Horgan, Arthur J. & Slattery, Vinc; J.
- Architectural style: Italian Renaissance Revival
- NRHP reference No.: 83001639
- Added to NRHP: May 6, 1983

48th Police Precinct Station is a historic police station located at 1925 Bathgate Avenue in the Tremont neighborhood of the Bronx, New York City. It was completed in 1901 and is a freestanding, three story rectangular block, seven bays wide. The facades are composed of yellow brick with stone trim in the Italian Renaissance Revival style.

It was formerly used by the New York City Police Department. Police Lieutenant Charles Becker was arrested there for the murder of gambler Herman Rosenthal in 1912. The building ceased use as a police station in the 1970s. As of June 2010, it was occupied by Sharon Baptist Headstart.

It was listed on the National Register of Historic Places in 1983.
