= Companies listed on the New York Stock Exchange (U) =

== U ==
| Stock name | Symbol | Country of origin |
|---|---|---|
| U-Haul Holding Company | UHAL | United States |
| U-Haul Holding Company | UHAL.B | United States |
| Uber Technologies, Inc. | UBER | United States |
| Ubiquiti Inc. | UI | United States |
| UBS Group AG | UBS | Switzerland |
| UDR, Inc. | UDR | United States |
| UGI Corporation | UGI | United States |
| UGI Corporation | UGIC | United States |
| UiPath Inc. | PATH | United States |
| Ultrapar Participações S.A. | UGP | Brazil |
| UMH Properties, Inc. | UMH | United States |
| UMH Properties, Inc. | UMH.PRD | United States |
| Under Armour, Inc. | UA | United States |
| Under Armour, Inc. | UAA | United States |
| Unifi, Inc. | UFI | United States |
| UniFirst Corporation | UNF | United States |
| Unilever PLC | UL | United Kingdom |
| Union Pacific Corporation | UNP | United States |
| Unisys Corporation | UIS | United States |
| United Microelectronics Corporation | UMC | Taiwan |
| United Natural Foods, Inc. | UNFI | United States |
| United Parcel Service, Inc. | UPS | United States |
| United Rentals, Inc. | URI | United States |
| UnitedHealth Group Incorporated | UNH | United States |
| Unitil Corporation | UTL | United States |
| Unity Software Inc. | U | United States |
| Univar Solutions Inc. | UNVR | United States |
| Universal Corporation | UVV | United States |
| Universal Health Realty Income Trust | UHT | United States |
| Universal Health Services, Inc. | UHS | United States |
| Universal Insurance Holdings, Inc. | UVE | United States |
| Universal Technical Institute, Inc. | UTI | United States |
| Unum Group | UNM | United States |
| Unum Group | UNMA | United States |
| UpHealth, Inc. | UPH | United States |
| Urban Edge Properties | UE | United States |
| Urstadt Biddle Properties Inc. | UBA | United States |
| Urstadt Biddle Properties Inc. | UBP | United States |
| Urstadt Biddle Properties Inc. | UBP.PRH | United States |
| Urstadt Biddle Properties Inc. | UBP.PRK | United States |
| U.S. Bancorp | USB | United States |
| U.S. Bancorp | USB.PRA | United States |
| U.S. Bancorp | USB.PRP | United States |
| U.S. Bancorp | USB.PRH | United States |
| U.S. Bancorp | USB.PRQ | United States |
| U.S. Bancorp | USB.PRR | United States |
| U.S. Bancorp | USB.PRS | United States |
| U.S. Cellular Corporation | USM | United States |
| U.S. Cellular Corporation | UZF | United States |
| U.S. Cellular Corporation | UZE | United States |
| U.S. Cellular Corporation | UZD | United States |
| US Foods Holding Corp. | USFD | United States |
| U.S. Physical Therapy, Inc. | USPH | United States |
| U.S. Silica Holdings, Inc. | SLCA | United States |
| U.S. Steel Corporation | X | United States |
| USA Compression Partners, LP | USAC | United States |
| USANA Health Sciences, Inc. | USNA | United States |
| USD Partners LP | USDP | United States |
| Utz Brands, Inc. | UTZ | United States |
| UWM Holdings Corporation | UWMC | United States |
