= List of New York State Historic Markers in Bronx County, New York =

This is a complete list of New York State Historic Markers in Bronx County, New York.

== Listings county-wide ==
| | Marker name | Image | Date designated | Location | City or Town | Marker text |
|---|---|---|---|---|---|---|
| 1 | Bronx River | | | Bronx River, At Boston Rd. Bridge, in Bronx Park 40°51′10.5″N 73°52′26.5″W | Bronx, New York | During the Revolution, the British Fleet was ordered to "Proceed up the Bronx and attack the Yankees in hiding above." |
| 2 | City Island | | | City Island Park | Bronx, New York | Pearl Of The Sound, was so called, because it was planned to outstrip New York City. Oyster culture first started here. |
| 3 | Drake Park | | | Joseph Rodman Dake Park, Hunt's Point Ave. | Bronx, New York | Contains grave of Joseph Rodman Drake, poet, author of "The Culprit Fay", "Ode To The American Flag", and "Bronx." |
| 4 | Featherbed Lane | | | Park Triangle At Featherbed Lane | Bronx, New York | So called from story that farmers' wives, in 1776, aided Americans to escape British by spreading featherbeds on the lane. |
| 5 | Fording Place | | | West Side Of Lake In Bronx River, Opposite Zoological Sec., 1/3 Mi. North | Bronx, New York | Early crossing of Bronx River, nearby was Bear Swamp, haunt of bears. Site of Sewanoe Indian Village up to 1689. |
| 6 | Fort Independence | | | Claflin Ter. On Walk East Of Reservoir Opposite Fort Independence Ave. | Bronx, New York | One of a chain of forts built in 1776 by Americans to command the valley below. General Richard Montgomery had a farm nearby, in 1772. |
| 7 | Fort Number Four | | | Claflin Ter. East Of Sedgwick Ave., West Of Jerome Park Reservoir HMDb 53810 | Bronx, New York | One of the chain of forts built by the Americans in 1776, to command the valley of the Harlem River; later occupied by the British |
| 8 | Glover's Rock | | | On Road To City Island Near Tablet Off Road | Bronx, New York | In Battle of Pell's Point, Col. Glover and 550 men, held British long enough for Washington's army to escape to White Plains. Historical Marker Database ID 98622 |
| 9 | Hunter's Island | | | Hunter's Island at entrance from highway | Bronx, New York | Contains the Hunter-Iselin Mansion; Ogden Mansion on Twin Island; Indian Name Laapawachking, - "Place Of Stringing Beads". |
| 10 | Jonas Bronck | | | Pulaski Park | Bronx, New York | First settler in the Bronx, 1639, built house east of this park, where was signed treaty between Dutch and Weckquaeskeek Indians, 1642. |
| 11 | Lydig's Mill | | | Bronx River, About Opposite Entrance To New York Zoological Gardens | Bronx, New York | Built in 18th century, stood here. North was Johnson's Tavern, where stage coaches, New York To Boston, stopped to change horses. |
| 12 | Macombs Dam | | | Macombs Dam Park | Bronx, New York | Bridge is on site of Old Dam which made pond of Harlem River. Dam became nuisance and was torn down by citizens in 1840. |
| 13 | Old Indian Path | | | Location: Bet. Pelham Bay Park on Split Rock Road, And Bet. Pelham Manor And Pelham Road. | Bronx, New York | Later known as the Split Rock Road many of erected by the Park Dept, City Of New York, October 18, 1938. |
| 14 | Parade Ground | | | On Broadway, West Side Of Parade Ground Van Cortlandt Park | Bronx, New York | Here was the bouwerie or farm of Adrian Van Der Donck, secured by purchase from Indians and grant by Governor Kieft, 1650. |
| 15 | Pell Estate | | | Pelham Bay Park | Bronx, New York | Thomas Pell of Fairfield, Conn., under tree known as Treaty Oak, bought Pelham Manor from the sachems Annhoock and Maminepoe |
| 16 | Poe Cottage | | | Grand Concourse | Bronx, New York | Edgar Allan Poe lived here 1846-49 and wrote many of his poems, "Annabel Lee", Ulalume, and others. His wife, Virginia, died here. |
| 17 | Screven's Point | | | Small Park At End Of Castle Hill Ave. | Bronx, New York | Sewanoe Indians had castle here, seen by Adrian Block on his voyage, 1614. Loyalist clergymen, including Samuel Seabury, hid in farmhouse. |
| 18 | Site Of West Chester Town | | | Tarrytown | Bronx, New York | Prescott Bryant repulsed British at causeway over West Chester Creek Westchester Lexington |
| 19 | Split Rock | | | At Split Rock, Pelham Bay Park | Bronx, New York | Near here was home of Anne Hutchinson, who settled in 1642. She and her family were killed in the Indian Uprising, 1662 |
| 20 | St. Ann's Shrine | | | St Ann's Avenue, South Bronx | Bronx, New York | Here rests Lewis Morris, "Signer" Declaration of Independence; Gouverneur Morris, "Penman" Constitution Of U.S.A.; Judge R.H. Morris, Mayor Of New York |
| 21 | Throgg's Neck | | | Throgg's Point Park | Bronx, New York | Named For Throckmorton, who settled here in 1642. One of his companions was Roger Williams, founder of Rhode Island. |
| 22 | Van Cortlandt Mansion | | | In front of Van Cortlandt House Museum 40°53′28.8″N 73°53′41.5″W | Bronx, New York | Built in 1748 by Frederick Van Cortlandt. Hessian headquarters in Revolution. Washington and Rochambeau were here. |
| 23 | Van Cortlandt Mill | | | On Brook, Near Dam, East Of Van Cortlandt Mansion | Bronx, New York | Site of grist and saw mill of Van Cortlandt family. Used over 200 years, burned in 1901. One of the millstones is west of the mansion. |
| 24 | Van Der Donck | | | East Of Van Cortlandt Mansion, Between it and Dam | Bronx, New York | Adrian Van Der Donck, first settler here, 1650 built house, later burned by Indians. Original site of Van Cortlandt House. |
| 25 | Vault Hill | | | On East Hill Of Parade Ground, North Of Railroad Underpass, In Van Cortland | Bronx, New York | Burial vault of the Van Cortlandt family, where Augustus Van Cortlandt, City Clerk, hid New York records during Revolution. |

== See also ==
- List of New York State Historic Markers
- National Register of Historic Places listings in the Bronx
- List of National Historic Landmarks in New York City
