= Hertlein and Schlatter Silk Trimmings Factory =

- U.S. National Register of Historic Places
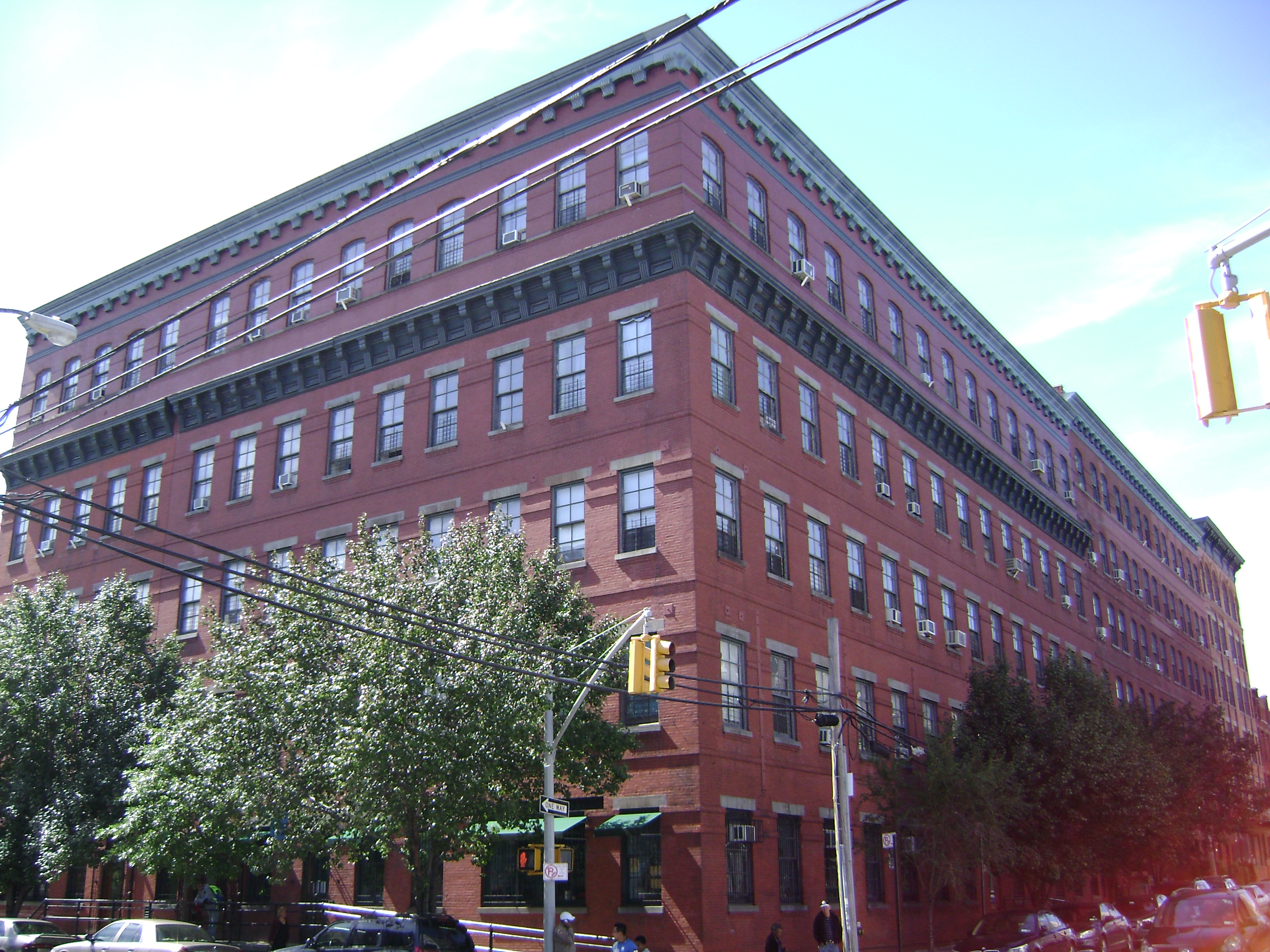

- Location within New York City Location within New York Location within the United States
- Location: 454-464 E. 148th St., Bronx
- Coordinates: 40°48′51″N 73°54′57″W
- Area: 1.5 acres (0.61 ha)
- Built: 1887
- Architect: Ogden, A.B, and Son; The Ogden Company
- Architectural style: Late 19th And Early 20th Century American Movements
- NRHP reference No.: 00001683
- Added to NRHP: February 5, 2001

Hertlein and Schlatter Silk Trimmings Factory is a historic factory building located in the Mott Haven section of The Bronx, New York, New York. The original building was built in 1887 and expanded in 1892 and 1910–1911. It is a five-story brick building, 14 bays long. A six-story extension was built in 1904–1905. It originally housed a silk trimming supplier. After 1935, it housed the Hygrade Casket Corporation until about 1982. The original building and extension remained vacant until restored during 1999-2000 for residential and commercial use.

It was listed on the National Register of Historic Places in 2001.

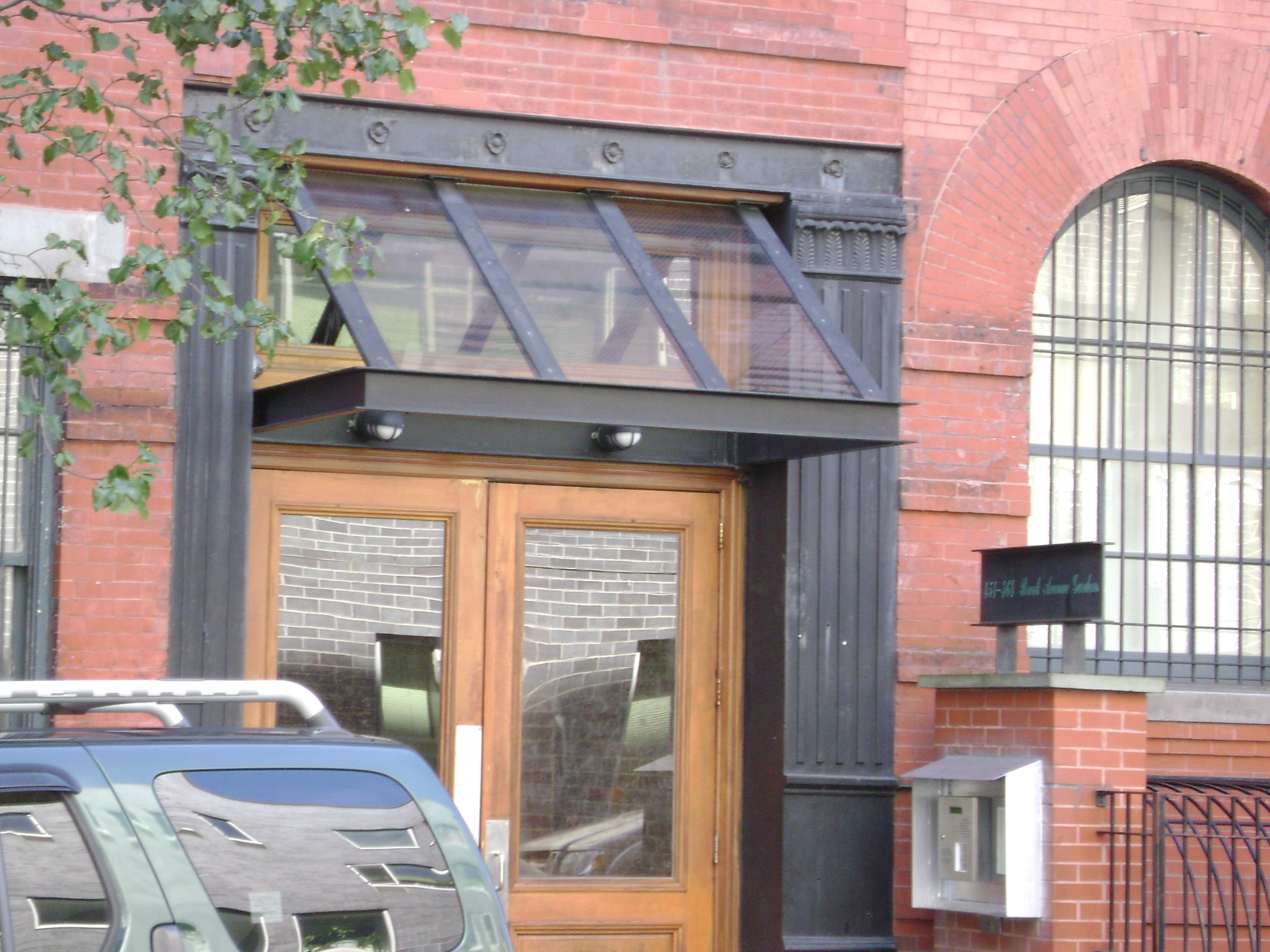
The entrance to the building
