= Interboro Theatre =

Theater in New York City (1920s–1995)

- Interactive map of Interboro Theatre
- Former names: Interborough Theatre
- Address: 3462 East Tremont Avenue; Throggs Neck, Bronx; U.S.
- Coordinates: 40.83177°N 73.82739°W
- Type: Theater
- Current use: Mixed use, including office space

Construction
- Closed: 1995
- Years active: 1920s – 1995

Interboro Theatre was built in the 1920s and originally called the Interborough for a rapid transit route expansion that never came to pass. It was at 3462 East Tremont Avenue between Barkley Boulevard and Eastern Boulevard, now Bruckner, in the Throggs Neck section of the Bronx in New York City. The first movie shown was Seventh Heaven in 1927. It hosted a variety of silent films and shows. A lice problem led to it becoming known as "The Itch". As it competed with television various draws were offered to get people in the door. It closed in 1995 and became a market and offices for the board of education.
