= West 147th–149th Streets Historic District =

Historic district in Manhattan, New York

- U.S. National Register of Historic Places
- U.S. Historic district
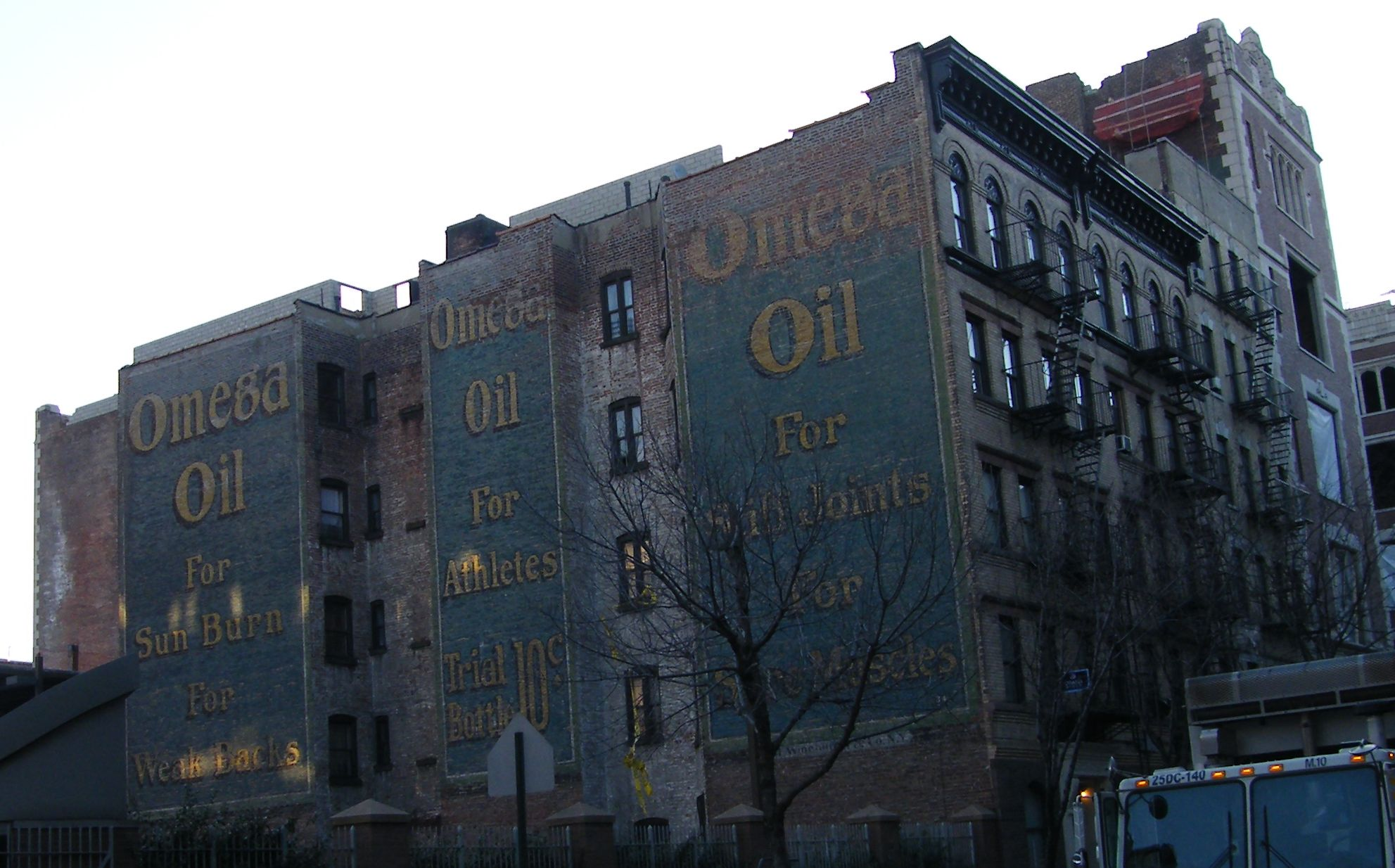
- West 147th–149th Streets Historic District, March 2009

- Location within New York City Location within New York Location within the United States
- Location: Roughly bounded by Eighth Ave., W. 149th St., Seventh Ave., and W. 147th Ave., New York, New York
- Coordinates: 40°49′26″N 73°56′22″W
- Area: 6.4 acres (2.6 ha)
- Built: 1894
- Architect: multiple
- Architectural style: Romanesque, Beaux Arts, et al.
- NRHP reference No.: 03000407
- Added to NRHP: May 18, 2003

West 147th–149th Streets Historic District is a national historic district in Harlem, New York, New York. It consists of 60 contributing buildings; 58 tenements, one school, and one stable built between 1894 and 1905. With the exception of the stable, all of the buildings are five or six stories tall, all with brick facades. Most have some form of terra cotta ornament and all have pressed metal cornices. The earlier buildings reflect the Romanesque Revival style, with ornamental inspiration drawn from Renaissance and French Beaux-Arts styles.

It was listed on the National Register of Historic Places in 2003.
