= Companies listed on the New York Stock Exchange (O) =

== O ==
| Stock name | Symbol | Country of origin |
|---|---|---|
| Oaktree Capital Group, LLC | OAK | US |
| Occidental Petroleum Corporation | OXY | US |
| Oceaneering International Inc. | OII | US |
| Och-Ziff Capital Management Group LLC | OZM | US |
| OCI Partners LP | OCIP | US |
| OCI Resources LP | OCIR | US |
| Ocwen Financial Corporation | OCN | US |
| Office Depot Inc. | ODP | US |
| OFG Bancorp | OFG | US |
| OFG Bancorp | OFG.PRA | Puerto Rico |
| OFG Bancorp | OFG.PRB | Puerto Rico |
| OFG Bancorp | OFG.PRD | Puerto Rico |
| OGE Energy Corp. | OGE | US |
| Oi S.A. | OIBR | Brazil |
| Oi S.A. | OIBR.C | Brazil |
| Oil Dri Corporation of America | ODC | US |
| Oil States International, Inc | OIS | US |
| Oiltanking Partners, L.P. | OILT | US |
| Old Republic International Corporation | ORI | US |
| Olin Corporation | OLN | US |
| OM Group, Inc. | OMG | US |
| Omega Healthcare Investors, Inc | OHI | US |
| Omega Protein Corporation | OME | US |
| Omnicare Inc. | OCR | US |
| Omnicare Capital Trust I | OCR.PRA | US |
| Omnicare Capital Trust II | OCR.PRB | US |
| Omnicom Group Inc. | OMC | US |
| OMNOVA Solutions Inc. | OMN | US |
| On Assignment, Inc. | ASGN | US |
| ONE Gas, Inc. | OGS | US |
| One Liberty Properties, Inc. | OLP | US |
| OneBeacon Insurance Group, LTD | OB | US |
| ONEOK, Inc. | OKE | US |
| Oneok Partners, L.P. | OKS | US |
| Onterris | ONT | US |
| OPKO Health, Inc. | OPK | US |
| Oppenheimer Holdings Inc. | OPY | US |
| Oracle Corporation | ORCL | US |
| Orange S.A. | ORAN | France |
| Orbital Sciences Corporation | ORB | US |
| Orient Express Hotels Ltd. | BEL | US |
| Orion Engineered Carbons S.A. | OEC | Luxembourg |
| Orion Marine Group, Inc. | ORN | US |
| Orix Corporation | IX | Japan |
| Ormat Technologies, Inc. | ORA | US |
| Oshkosh Corporation | OSK | US |
| Owens & Minor Inc. | OMI | US |
| Owens Corning | OC | US |
| Owens Illinois Inc. | OI | US |
| Oxford Industries Inc. | OXM | US |
| Oxford Resource Partners, LP | OXF | US |
