= Companies listed on the New York Stock Exchange (G) =

== G ==
Stock name	Symbol	Country of origin
The Gabelli Convertible and Income Securities Fund, Inc.	GCV	US
The Gabelli Convertible and Income Securities Fund, Inc.	GCV.PRB	US
The Gabelli Dividend & Income Trust	GDV	US
The Gabelli Dividend & Income Trust	GDV.PRA	US
The Gabelli Dividend & Income Trust	GDV.PRD	US
The Gabelli Equity Trust Inc.	GAB	US
The Gabelli Equity Trust Inc.	GAB.PRD	US
The Gabelli Equity Trust Inc.	GAB.PRG	US
The Gabelli Equity Trust Inc.	GAB.PRH	US
The Gabelli Global Small and Mid Cap Value Trust	GGZ	US
The Gabelli Healthcare & Wellness Rx Trust	GRX	US
The Gabelli Healthcare & Wellness Rx Trust	GRX.PRA	US
The Gabelli Multimedia Trust Inc.	GGT	US
The Gabelli Multimedia Trust Inc.	GGT.PRB	US
The Gabelli Utility Trust	GUT	US
The Gabelli Utility Trust	GUT.PRA	US
Gafisa S.A.	GFA	Brazil
GAIN Capital Holdings, Inc.	GCAP	US
Gamco Investors, Inc.	GBL	US
GAMCO Natural Resources, Gold & Income Trust	GNT	US
GameStop Corp.	GME	US
Gannett Co., Inc.	GCI	US
The Gap, Inc.	GPS	US
Gartner Inc.	IT	US
GasLog Ltd.	GLOG	US
GasLog Partners LP	GLOP	Marshall Islands
Gatx Corporation	GMT	US
Gazit-Globe Ltd.	GZT	Israel
The GDL Fund	GDL	US
The GDL Fund	GDL.PRB	US
Gencorp Inc	GY	US
Generac Holdings Inc.	GNRC	US
General American Investors Company, Inc.	GAM	US
General American Investors Company, Inc.	GAM.PRB	US
General Cable Corporation	BGC	US
General Dynamics Corporation	GD	US
General Electric Company	GE	US
General Electric Capital Company	GEB	US
General Electric Capital Corporation	GEH	US
General Electric Capital Corporation	GEK	US
General Mills, Inc.	GIS	US
General Motors Company	GM	US
General Motors Company	GM.WS.A	US
General Motors Company	GM.WS.B	US
General Motors Company	GM.WS.C	US
General Steel Holdings, Inc.	GSI	China
Genesco Inc.	GCO	US
Genesee & Wyoming, Inc.	GWR	US
Genesee & Wyoming, Inc.	GWRU	US
Genesis Energy, L.P.	GEL	US
Genie Energy Ltd.	GNE	US
Genie Energy Ltd.	GNE.PRA	US
Genpact Limited	G	India
Genuine Parts Company	GPC	US
Genworth Financial, Inc.	GNW	US
Geo Group, Inc.	GEO	US
GeoPark Limited	GPRK	US
Georgia Power Company	GPE.PRA	US
Gerdau S.A.	GGB	Brazil
Getty Realty Corp.	GTY	US
GFI Group Inc.	GFIG	US
Gigamon Inc.	GIMO	US
Gildan Activewear Inc.	GIL	Canada
Glatfelter	GLT	US
GlaxoSmithKline	GSK	United Kingdom
Glimcher Realty Trust	GRT	US
Glimcher Realty Trust	GRT.PRG	US
Glimcher Realty Trust	GRT.PRH	US
Glimcher Realty Trust	GRT.PRI	US
Global Brass and Copper Holdings, Inc.	BRSS	US
Global Cash Access Holdings	GCA	US
Global High Income Fund, Inc.	GHI	US
Global Partners LP	GLP	US
Global Payments Inc.	GPN	US
Global Power Equipment Group, Inc.	GLPW	US
Global Ship Lease, Inc	GSL	United Kingdom
Globus Medical, Inc.	GMED	US
GMAC Capital Trust I	ALLY.PRA	US
GNC Holdings, Inc.	GNC	US
GOL Linhas Aéreas Inteligentes S.A.	GOL	Brazil
Gold Fields Limited	GFI	South Africa
Goldcorp Inc.	GG	Canada
Goldman Sachs Group Inc.	GS	US
Goldman Sachs Group Inc.	GSF	US
Goldman Sachs Group Inc.	GSJ	US
Goldman Sachs Group Inc.	GS.PRA	US
Goldman Sachs Group Inc.	GS.PRB	US
Goldman Sachs Group Inc.	GS.PRC	US
Goldman Sachs Group Inc.	GS.PRD	US
Goldman Sachs Group Inc.	GS.PRI	US
Goldman Sachs Group Inc.	GS.PRJ	US
Goldman Sachs Group Inc.	GS.PRK	US
Goldman Sachs MLP Income Opportunities Fund	GMZ	US
Goodrich Petroleum Corporation	GDP	US
Goodrich Petroleum Corporation	GDP.PRC	US
Goodrich Petroleum Corporation	GDP.PRD	US
Government Properties Income Trust	GOV	US
The Governor and Company of the Bank of Ireland	IRE	Ireland
GP Strategies Corporation	GPX	US
Graco Inc.	GGG	US
Graftech International, Ltd.	GTI	US
Graham Corporation	GHM	US
Graham Holdings Company	GHC	US
Gramercy Property Trust Inc.	GPT	US
Gramercy Property Trust Inc.	GPT.PRA	US
Granite Construction, Inc.	GVA	US
Granite Real Estate Investment Trust	GRP.U	Canada
Graphic Packaging Holding Company	GPK	US
Gray Television, Inc.	GTN	US
Gray Television, Inc.	GTN.A	US
Graña y Montero S.A.A.	GRAM	US
Great Northern Iron Ore Properties	GNI	US
Great Plains Energy Inc.	GXP	US
Great Plains Energy Inc.	GXP.PRA	US
Great Plains Energy Inc.	GXP.PRD	US
Great Plains Energy Inc.	GXP.PRE	US
Greatbatch, Inc.	GB	US
Green Dot Corporation	GDOT	US
The Greenbrier Companies, Inc.	GBX	US
Greenhill & Co., Inc.	GHL	US
Greif, Inc.	GEF	US
Greif, Inc.	GEF.B	US
Griffon Corporation	GFF	US
Group 1 Automotive Inc.	GPI	US
GrubHub Inc.	GRUB	US
GRUMA, S.A.B. de C.V.	GMK	Mexico
Grupo Aeroportuario del Pacifico, S.A.B de C.V.	PAC	Mexico
Grupo Aeroportuario del Sureste, S.A.B. de C.V.	ASR	Mexico
Grupo Financiero Santander Mexico, S.A.B. de C.V.	BSMX	Mexico
Grupo Televisa, S.A.	TV	Mexico
Guangshen Railway Co., Ltd.	GSH	China
Guess?, Inc.	GES	US
Guggenheim Build America Bonds Managed Duration Trust	GBAB	US
Guggenheim Credit Allocation Fund	GGM	US
Guggenheim Enhanced Equity Income Fund	GPM	US
Guggenheim Enhanced Equity Strategy Fund	GGE	US
Guggenheim Equal Weight Enhanced Equity Income Fund	GEQ	US
Guggenheim Strategic Opportunities Fund Common Shares	GOF	US
Guidewire Software, Inc.	GWRE	US
Gulf Power Company	GUA	US
GulfMark Offshore, Inc.	GLF	US
