= Companies listed on the New York Stock Exchange (R) =

== R ==
Stock name	Symbol	Country of origin
Radian Group	RDN	US
Rally Software Development Corp.	RALY	US
Ralph Lauren Corporation	RL	US
RPT Realty	RPT	US
Range Resources	RRC	US
Raymond James Financial	RJF	US
Raymond James Financial	RJD	US
Rayonier	RYN	US
Rayonier Advanced Materials	RYAM	US
RCS Capital Corporation	RCAP	US
RE/MAX	RMAX	US
RealD	RLD	US
Realty Income Corporation	O	US
Red Lion Hotels Corporation	RLH	US
Redwire Corporation	RDW	US
Redwood Trust Inc	RWT	US
Regal-Beloit	RBC	US
Regal Entertainment Group	RGC	US
Regency Centers Corporation	REG	US
Regional Management Corp.	RM	US
Regions Financial Corporation	RF	US
Regis Corporation	RGS	US
Reinsurance Group of America	RGA	US
Reliance Steel & Aluminum Co.	RS	US
RenaissanceRe Holdings Ltd.	RNR	Bermuda
ReneSola	SOL	China
Renren	RENN	China
Rentech	RNF	US
Republic Services	RSG	US
ResMed	RMD	US
Resolute Energy Corporation	REN	US
Resolute Forest Products	RFP	US
Restoration Hardware	RH	US
Restaurant Brands International	QSR	US
Retail Properties of America, Inc.	RPAI	US
Revlon	REV	US
REX American Resources	REX	US
Rexford Industrial Realty, Inc.	REXR	US
Rexnord Corporation	RXN	US
Reynolds American	RAI	US
Rhino Resource Partners LP	RNO	Canada
RingCentral	RNG	US
Rio Alto Mining	RIOM	US
Rio Tinto Group	RIO	United Kingdom
Ritchie Bros. Auctioneers	RBA	Canada
RLI Corp.	RLI	US
RLJ Lodging Trust	RLJ	US
Roadrunner Transportation Systems	RRTS	US
Robert Half International	RHI	US
Roblox Corporation	RBLX	US
Rocket Companies	RKT	US
Rockwell Automation	ROK	US
Rockwell Collins	COL	US
Rockwood Holdings, Inc.	ROC	US
Rogers Corporation	ROG	US
Rogers Communications	RCI	Canada
Rollins Inc.	ROL	US
Roper Industries	ROP	US
Rose Rock Midstream, L.P.	RRMS	US
Rosetta Stone	RST	US
Roundy's	RNDY	US
Royal Bank of Canada	RY	Canada
Royal Bank of Scotland	RBS	United Kingdom
Royal Caribbean Group	RCL	US
Royal Dutch Shell	RDS.A	Netherlands
RPC Inc.	RES	US
RPM International	RPM	US
RSP Permian, Inc.	RSPP	US
RTI International Metals	RTI	US
Rubicon Project	RUBI	US
Ruckus Wireless	RKUS	US
Rudolph Technologies, Inc.	RTEC	US
Ryder	R	US
Ryman Hospitality Properties	RHP	US
