= Companies listed on the New York Stock Exchange (X) =

== X ==
Stock name	Symbol	Country of origin
X Financial	XYF	China
XAI Octagon Floating Rate & Alternative Income Trust	XFLT	United States
XAI Octagon Floating Rate & Alternative Income Trust	XFLT.PRA	United States
Xenia Hotels & Resorts, Inc.	XHR	United States
Xinyuan Real Estate Co., Ltd.	XIN	China
XPeng Inc.	XPEV	China
Xperi Inc.	XPER	United States
XPO, Inc.	XPO	United States
Xponential Fitness, Inc.	XPOF	United States
Xylem Inc.	XYL	United States
