= Companies listed on the New York Stock Exchange (L) =

== L ==
Stock name	Symbol	Country of origin
L-3 Communications	LLL	US
L Brands	LB	US
La Quinta Inns & Suites	LQ	US
La-Z-Boy	LZB	US
LabCorp	LH	US
Laclede Group	LG	US
Ladder Capital Corp	LADR	US
Landauer, Inc.	LDR	US
Lannett Company, Inc	LCI	US
Laredo Petroleum	LPI	US
Las Vegas Sands	LVS	US
LaSalle Hotel Properties	LHO	US
LaSalle Hotel Properties	LHO.PRH	US
LaSalle Hotel Properties	LHO.PRI	US
LATAM Airlines Group	LFL	Chile
Lazard	LAZ	US
LeapFrog Enterprises	LF	US
Lear Corporation	LEA	US
Lee Enterprises	LEE	US
Leggett & Platt	LEG	US
Lehigh Gas Partners LP	LGP	US
Leidos	LDOS	US
Leju Holdings Limited	LEJU	China
Lennar	LEN & LEN.B	US
Lennox International	LII	US
Lentuo International Inc.	LAS	China
Leucadia National	LUK	US
Level 3 Communications	LVLT	US
Lexington Realty Trust	LXP	US
Lexmark	LXK	US
LG Display	LPL	South Korea
Life Time Fitness	LTM	US
LifeLock	LOCK	US
LIN Media	LIN	US
Lincoln National Corporation	LNC	US
Lindsay Manufacturing	LNN	US
Lions Gate Entertainment	LGF	Canada
Lithia Motors	LAD	US
Live Nation Entertainment	LYV	US
Lloyds Banking Group	LYG	United Kingdom
Lockheed Martin	LMT	US
Loews Corporation	L	US
Lorillard Tobacco Company	LO	US
Louisiana-Pacific	LPX	US
Lowe's	LOW	US
LRR Energy, L.P.	LRE	US
LSB Industries, Inc.	LXU	US
LTC Properties Inc.	LTC	US
Luby's	LUB	US
Lumber Liquidators	LL	US
Luxfer Holdings PLC	LXFR	United Kingdom
Luxottica	LUX	Italy
Lydall, Inc.	LDL	US
LyondellBasell	LYB	US
