= Lisanti Chapel =

Historic chapel in Bronx, New York, US

- U.S. National Register of Historic Places
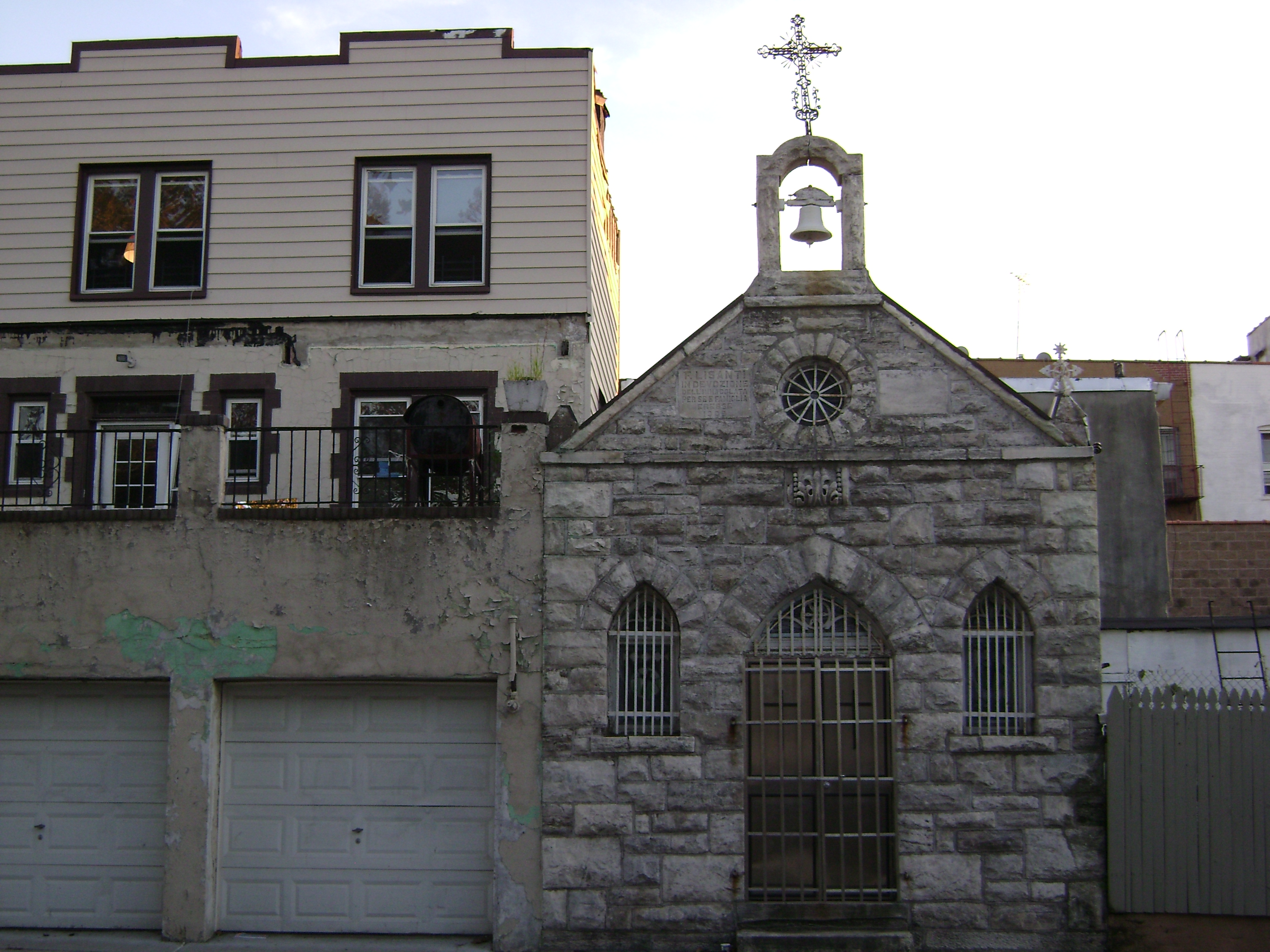

- Location within New York City Location within New York Location within the United States
- Location: 740 E. 215th St., Bronx, New York
- Coordinates: 40°52′48″N 73°51′46″W
- Area: 0.3 acres (0.12 ha)
- Built: 1905
- Architectural style: Late 19th And 20th Century Revivals
- NRHP reference No.: 01001447
- Added to NRHP: January 11, 2002

Lisanti Chapel is a historic chapel at 740 E. 215th Street, Bronx, New York in the Williamsbridge neighborhood of The Bronx.

It was built in 1905 by Francesco Lisanti, an Italian Immigrant, and added to the National Register of Historic Places in 2002.

The chapel has pointed-arched window and door openings and various other subtle Gothic Revival details with a Southern Italian character; the date plaque is inscribed: "F LISANTI IN DEVOZIONE DELL IMMACOLATA PER SE E FAMIGLIA ERESSE 1905"
