= Companies listed on the New York Stock Exchange (Z) =

== Z ==
Stock name	Symbol	Country of origin
Zai Lab	ZLAB	China
Zepp Health Corporation	ZEPP	China
Zeta Global Holdings Corp.	ZETA	United States
Zevia PBC	ZVIA	United States
Zebra Technologies	ZBRA	United States
Zedge	ZDGE	Norway
Zenas Biopharma	ZBIO	United States
Zenatech	ZENA	Canada
Zenta Group	ZGM	Macao
Zentek Ltd	ZTEK	Canada
Zeo Energy	ZEO	United States
Zhengye Biotechnology Holding Ltd	ZYBT	China
Zhihu Inc.	ZH	China
Zhibao Technology Inc.	ZBAO	China
Zhongchao Inc.	ZCMD	China
Ziff Davis	ZD	United States
Zillow	ZG	United States
ZIM Integrated Shipping Services Ltd.	ZIM	Israel
Zimmer Biomet Holdings, Inc.	ZBH	United States
Zions Bankcorporation	ZION	United States
ZipRecruiter, Inc.	ZIP	United States
ZK International	ZKIN	China
ZJK Industrial	ZJK	China
ZKH Group Limited	ZKH	China
Zoetis Inc.	ZTS	United States
Zoom Communications	ZM	United States
Zooz Strategy	ZOOZ	Israel
ZTO Express (Cayman) Inc.	ZTO	China
Zevra Therapeutics Inc	ZVRA	United States
Zscaler	ZS	United States
Zura Bio Ltd	ZURA	United States
Zurn Elkay Water Solutions Corporation	ZWS	United States
Zumiez Inc	ZUMZ	United States
Zymeworks	ZYME	Canada
