= Companies listed on the New York Stock Exchange (Y) =

== Y ==
Stock name	Symbol	Country of origin
Yalla Group Limited	YALA	United Arab Emirates
Yatsen Holding Limited	YSG	China
Yelp Inc.	YELP	United States
Yeti Holdings, Inc.	YETI	United States
Yext, Inc.	YEXT	United States
Yiren Digital Ltd.	YRD	China
Youdao, Inc.	DAO	China
YPF Sociedad Anónima	YPF	Argentina
Yum! Brands, Inc.	YUM	United States
Yum China Holdings, Inc.	YUMC	China
