= BoCoCa =

Neighborhood in Brooklyn, New York City

Coordinates: 40.6857°N 73.9941°W

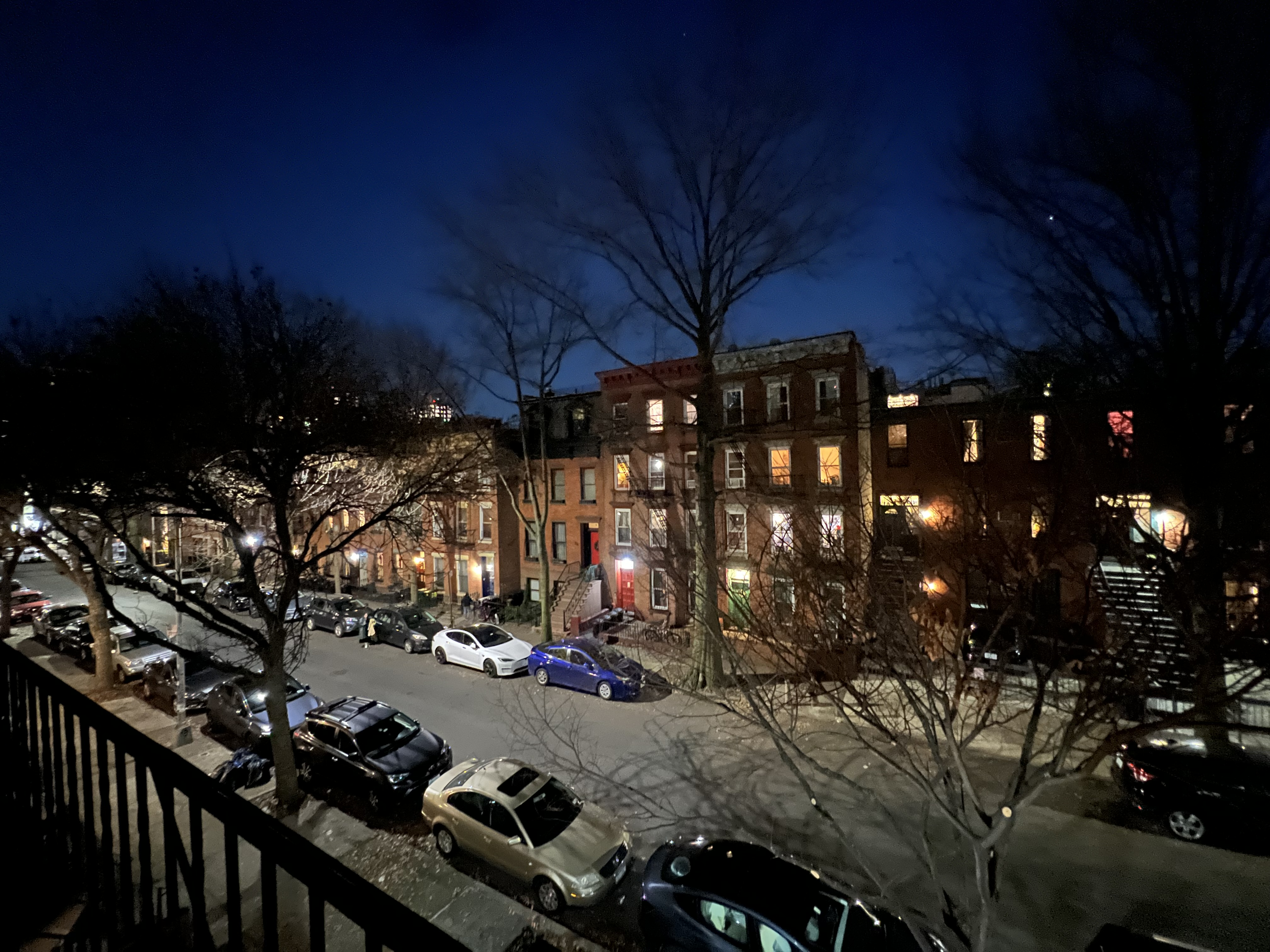
Streetscape in the center of BoCoCa

BoCoCa is a portmanteau word combining the names of three adjacent neighborhoods in the Brooklyn borough of New York City: Boerum Hill, Cobble Hill, and Carroll Gardens. BoCoCa is not an actual neighborhood, but an umbrella term for the small region of Brooklyn directly south and southwest of Downtown Brooklyn. The relatively new name is not widely used, but is gaining greater currency, even outside the United States. One of its earliest appearances in print came from the November 1, 2002 issue of Newsday where it was described as one of several new acronyms for New York City locations alongside DUMBO and SoHa. Among the publications using BoCoCa to classify neighborhoods are the Not for Tourists guide and New York magazine, both of which list BoCoCa together with neighboring Red Hook.

NYC & Company, New York City's "official marketing, tourism and partnership organization", has conferred recognition of the term BoCoCa on its web site. However, it is a word that has not gained traction and is almost never used by actual residents of the three neighborhoods in question.

== See also ==
- South Brooklyn
- Dumbo
- FiDi
- TriBeCa
- SoHo
- NoHo
- Nolita
- NoMad
