= Companies listed on the New York Stock Exchange (J) =

== J ==
Stock name	Symbol	Country of origin
J. M. Smucker Company	SJM	US
Jabil Circuit Inc.	JBL	US
Jacobs Engineering Group Inc.	J	US
James Hardie Industries plc	JHX	Australia
Janus Capital Group Inc.	JNS	US
Japan Smaller Capitalization Fund, Inc.	JOF	US
Jarden Corporation	JAH	US
Javelin Mortgage Investment Corp.	JMI	US
J.C. Penney Company Inc.	JCP	US
JGWPT Holdings Inc.	JGW	US
JinkoSolar Holding Co., Ltd.	JKS	Cayman Islands
JMP Group Inc.	JMP	US
JMP Group Inc.	JMPB	US
JMP Group Inc.	JMPC	US
John Bean Technologies Corporation	JBT	US
John Hancock Financial Opportunities Fund	BTO	US
John Hancock Hedged Equity & Income Fund	HEQ	US
John Hancock Income Securities Trust	JHS	US
John Hancock Investors Trust	JHI	US
John Hancock Preferred Income Fund II	HPF	US
John Hancock Preferred Income Fund	HPI	US
John Hancock Preferred Income Fund III	HPS	US
John Hancock Premium Dividend Fund	PDT	US
John Hancock Tax- Advantaged Dividend Income	HTD	US
John Hancock Tax-Advantaged Global Shareholder Yield Fund	HTY	US
John Wiley & Sons, Inc.	JW.A	US
Johnson & Johnson	JNJ	US
Johnson Controls, Inc.	JCI	US
Jones Energy, Inc.	JONE	US
Jones Lang Lasalle Inc.	JLL	US
Journal Communications, Inc.	JRN	US
JPMorgan Chase & Co.	JPM	US
JPMorgan Chase & Co.	JPM.PRA	US
JPMorgan Chase & Co.	JPM.PRB	US
JPMorgan Chase & Co.	JPM.PRD	US
JPMorgan Chase & Co.	JPM.PRE	US
JPMorgan Chase & Co.	JPM.WS	US
JPMorgan Chase Capital XXIX	JPM.PRC	US
JPMorgan China Region Fund, Inc.	JFC	US
Jumei International Holding Limited	JMEI	China
Juniper Networks	JNPR	US
Just Energy Group Inc.	JE	US
