= List of New York City gardens =

The following is a list of gardens in New York City which are open to the public (listed alphabetically):

== Bronx ==
- Bartow-Pell Mansion
- Enid A. Haupt Glass Garden
- New York Botanical Garden
- Wave Hill

== Brooklyn ==
- Brooklyn Botanic Garden

== Manhattan ==
- British Garden at Hanover Square
- Central Park Conservatory Garden
- The Cloisters
- Fort Tryon Park Garden
- Frick Collection Courtyard Gardens
- High Line
- Liz Christy Garden

== Staten Island ==
- Staten Island Botanical Garden

== Queens ==
- Queens Botanical Garden

== See also ==
- Community gardens in New York City
