= List of full-block structures in New York City =

This is a list of full-block structures in New York City:

== Manhattan ==
- 111 Eighth Avenue, full-block Art Deco multi-use building located between Eighth and Ninth Avenues, and 15th and 16th Streets in the Chelsea neighborhood of the Manhattan borough of New York City
- 165 Waverly Place
- 2 Columbus Circle
- 3 Columbus Circle
- 383 Madison
- 400 West 37th Street, Hudson Crossing Apartments
- 51 Tenth Avenue, Formally the Liberty Inn a room-by-the-hour romance hotel.
- 5 Manhattan West
- 731 Lexington Avenue, 1,400,000 square foot glass skyscraper on the East Side of Midtown Manhattan, New York City
- 76 Eleventh Avenue
- 85 Tenth Avenue
- 99 Tenth Avenue
- Alexander Hamilton U.S. Custom House, built in 1902–07 by the federal government to house the duty collection operations for the Port of New York
- American Museum of Natural History, one of the largest museums in the world. The museum complex comprises 27 interconnected buildings housing 45 permanent exhibition halls, in addition to a planetarium and a library
- The Apthorp
- The Belnord
- Charles M. Schwab House
- Flatiron Building, triangular 22-story steel-framed landmarked building located at 175 Fifth Avenue in the borough of Manhattan, New York City
- James A. Farley Building, formerly the General Post Office Building
- JPMorgan Chase Building
- Madison Square Garden
- Manhattan House
- Museum of Arts and Design
- New York Life Building
- Pennsylvania Station (1910–1963)
- St. Patrick's Cathedral (Manhattan)
- the Stewart House, 21-story, full-block apartment building designed by Sylvan Bien and located at 70 East 10th Street
- Starrett-Lehigh Building
- Trump International Hotel and Tower (New York City)
- Tunnel (New York nightclub)
- United Palace
- Waldorf Astoria New York

== The Bronx ==
- Bronx Borough Courthouse
- Bronx County Courthouse
- Bronx County Hall of Justice
- Bronx-Lebanon Hospital Center
- Evander Childs Educational Campus
- Kingsbridge Armory
- Lincoln Hospital
- Theodore Roosevelt High School (New York City)
- Bronx General Post Office
- Yankee Stadium
- Yankee Stadium (1923)

== Brooklyn ==
- 1970 Pitkin Avenue
- 1994 Pitkin Avenue
- 2016 Pitkin Avenue
- 2021 Pitkin Avenue
- 2050 Pitkin Avenue
- Brooklyn Detention Complex
