= Companies listed on the New York Stock Exchange (W) =

== W ==
Stock name	Symbol	Country of origin
W&T Offshore, Inc.	WTI	United States
Wabash National Corporation	WNC	United States
Walker & Dunlop, Inc.	WD	United States
Wallbox N.V.	WBX	Spain
Walmart Inc.	WMT	United States
The Walt Disney Company	DIS	United States
Warby Parker Inc.	WRBY	United States
Warrior Met Coal, Inc.	HCC	United States
Waste Connections, Inc.	WCN	Canada
Waste Management, Inc.	WM	United States
Waterdrop Inc.	WDH	China
Waters Corporation	WAT	United States
Watsco, Inc.	WSO	United States
Watsco, Inc.	WSO.B	United States
Watts Water Technologies, Inc.	WTS	United States
Waverley Capital Acquisition Corp. 1	WAVC	United States
Waverley Capital Acquisition Corp. 1	WAVC.UN	United States
Wayfair Inc.	W	United States
Weave Communications, Inc.	WEAV	United States
Webster Financial Corporation	WBS	United States
Webster Financial Corporation	WBS.PRF	United States
Webster Financial Corporation	WBS.PRG	United States
WEC Energy Group, Inc.	WEC	United States
Weis Markets, Inc.	WMK	United States
Wells Fargo & Company	WFC	United States
Wells Fargo & Company	WFC.PRZ	United States
Wells Fargo & Company	WFC.PRL	United States
Wells Fargo & Company	WFC.PRQ	United States
Wells Fargo & Company	WFC.PRR	United States
Wells Fargo & Company	WFC.PRY	United States
Wells Fargo & Company	WFC.PRA	United States
Wells Fargo & Company	WFC.PRC	United States
Wells Fargo & Company	WFC.PRD	United States
Welltower Inc.	WELL	United States
WESCO International, Inc.	WCC	United States
WESCO International, Inc.	WCC.PRA	United States
West Fraser Timber Co. Ltd.	WFG	Canada
West Pharmaceutical Services, Inc.	WST	United States
Western Alliance Bancorporation	WAL	United States
Western Alliance Bancorporation	WAL.PRA	United States
Western Asset Diversified Income Fund	WDI	United States
Western Asset Emerging Markets Debt Fund Inc.	EMD	United States
Western Asset Managed Municipals Fund Inc.	MMU	United States
Western Asset Global High Income Fund Inc.	EHI	United States
Western Asset Global Corporate Defined Opportunity Fund Inc.	GDO	United States
Western Asset High Income Fund II Inc.	HIX	United States
Western Asset High Income Opportunity Fund Inc.	HIO	United States
Western Asset High Yield Defined Opportunity Fund Inc.	HYI	United States
Western Asset Inflation-Linked Income Fund	WIA	United States
Western Asset Inflation-Linked Opportunities & Income Fund	WIW	United States
Western Asset Investment Grade Income Fund Inc.	PAI	United States
Western Asset Investment Grade Defined Opportunity Trust Inc.	IGI	United States
Western Asset Mortgage Capital Corporation	WMC	United States
Western Asset Mortgage Opportunity Fund Inc.	DMO	United States
Western Asset Municipal Partners Fund Inc.	MNP	United States
Western Asset Municipal High Income Fund Inc.	MHF	United States
Western Asset Premier Bond Fund	WEA	United States
Western Asset Intermediate Muni Fund Inc.	SBI	United States
Western Midstream Partners, LP	WES	United States
The Western Union Company	WU	United States
Westinghouse Air Brake Technologies Corporation	WAB	United States
Westlake Chemical Partners LP	WLKP	United States
Westlake Corporation	WLK	United States
WestRock Company	WRK	United States
Westwood Holdings Group, Inc.	WHG	United States
WeWork Inc.	WE	United States
WEX Inc.	WEX	United States
Weyerhaeuser Company	WY	United States
Wheaton Precious Metals Corp.	WPM	Canada
Wheels Up Experience Inc.	UP	United States
Whirlpool Corporation	WHR	United States
White Mountains Insurance Group, Ltd.	WTM	Bermuda
Whitestone REIT	WSR	United States
WideOpenWest, Inc.	WOW	United States
John Wiley & Sons, Inc.	WLY	United States
John Wiley & Sons, Inc.	WLYB	United States
The Williams Companies, Inc.	WMB	United States
Williams-Sonoma, Inc.	WSM	United States
Winnebago Industries, Inc.	WGO	United States
Wipro Limited	WIT	India
WisdomTree, Inc.	WT	United States
WNS (Holdings) Limited	WNS	India
Wolfspeed, Inc.	WOLF	United States
Wolverine World Wide, Inc.	WWW	United States
Woodside Energy Group Ltd	WDS	Australia
Woori Financial Group Inc.	WF	South Korea
Workiva Inc.	WK	United States
World Kinect Corporation	WKC	United States
World Wrestling Entertainment, Inc.	WWE	United States
Worthington Industries, Inc.	WOR	United States
W. P. Carey Inc.	WPC	United States
WPP plc	WPP	United Kingdom
Wyndham Hotels & Resorts, Inc.	WH	United States
