= Companies listed on the New York Stock Exchange (0–9) =

== 0–9 ==
Stock name	Symbol	Country of origin
10X Capital Venture Acquisition Corp. III	VCXB	United States
10X Capital Venture Acquisition Corp. III	VCXB.U	United States
3D Systems Corporation	DDD	United States
3M Company	MMM	United States
