= Companies listed on the New York Stock Exchange (Q) =

== Q ==
| Stock name | Symbol | Country of origin |
|---|---|---|
| Q2 Holdings, Inc. | QTWO | US |
| Qiagen N.V. | QGEN | Netherlands |
| Quad/Graphics, Inc. | QUAD | US |
| Quaker Chemical Corporation | KWR | US |
| Quanex Building Products Corporation | NX | US |
| Quanta Services Inc. | PWR | US |
| Quantum FinTech Acquisition Corporation | QFTA | US |
| Quantum FinTech Acquisition Corporation | QFTA.UN | US |
| QuantumScape Corporation | QS | US |
| Qudian Inc. | QD | China |
| Quest Diagnostics Incorporated | DGX | US |
| Quotient Technology Inc. | QUOT | US |
| QVC, Inc. | QVCC | US |
| QVC, Inc. | QVCD | US |
| Qwest Corporation | CTBB | US |
| Qwest Corporation | CTDD | US |
