= National Capital Region (Canada) =

Metropolitan area

National Capital Region Région de la capitale nationale
- Capital region
- Confederation Building

- National Capital Region (striped area)
- Coordinates: 45°35′23″N 75°50′50″W
- Country: Canada
- Provinces: Ontario; Quebec
- Principal cities: Ottawa, ON; Gatineau, QC

Area
  - Metro: 8,046.99 km^{2} (3,106.96 sq mi)
- Elevation: 70–556 m (230–1,824 ft)

Population (2021)
  - Capital region: 1,488,307
  - Estimate (2025): 1,700,014
  - Rank: 4th
  - Metro density: 185/km^{2} (480/sq mi)

GDP
  - Ottawa–Gatineau CMA: $89.9 billion (2020)
- Time zone: UTC−05:00 (EST)
  - Summer (DST): UTC−04:00 (EDT)
- Area codes: 343, 468, 613, 753, 819, 873

The National Capital Region (NCR; French: Région de la capitale nationale, pronounced [ʁeʒjɔ̃ d(ə) la kapital nɑsjɔnal]), also known as Canada's Capital Region and Ottawa–Gatineau, is an official designation encompassing the federal capital of Canada, Ottawa, Ontario, the adjacent city of Gatineau, Quebec, and surrounding suburban and exurban areas. Despite its designation, the NCR is not a separate political or administrative entity and falls within the provinces of Ontario and Quebec.

Defined by the National Capital Act (1985), the NCR covers an area of 4,715 km^{2} (1,820 sq mi), straddling the Ottawa River, which serves as the boundary between Ontario and Quebec. This area is smaller than the Ottawa–Gatineau census metropolitan area (CMA), which spans 8,046.99 km^{2} (3,106.96 sq mi). Ottawa–Gatineau is the only CMA in Canada that crosses provincial boundaries.

== History ==
=== Early history ===
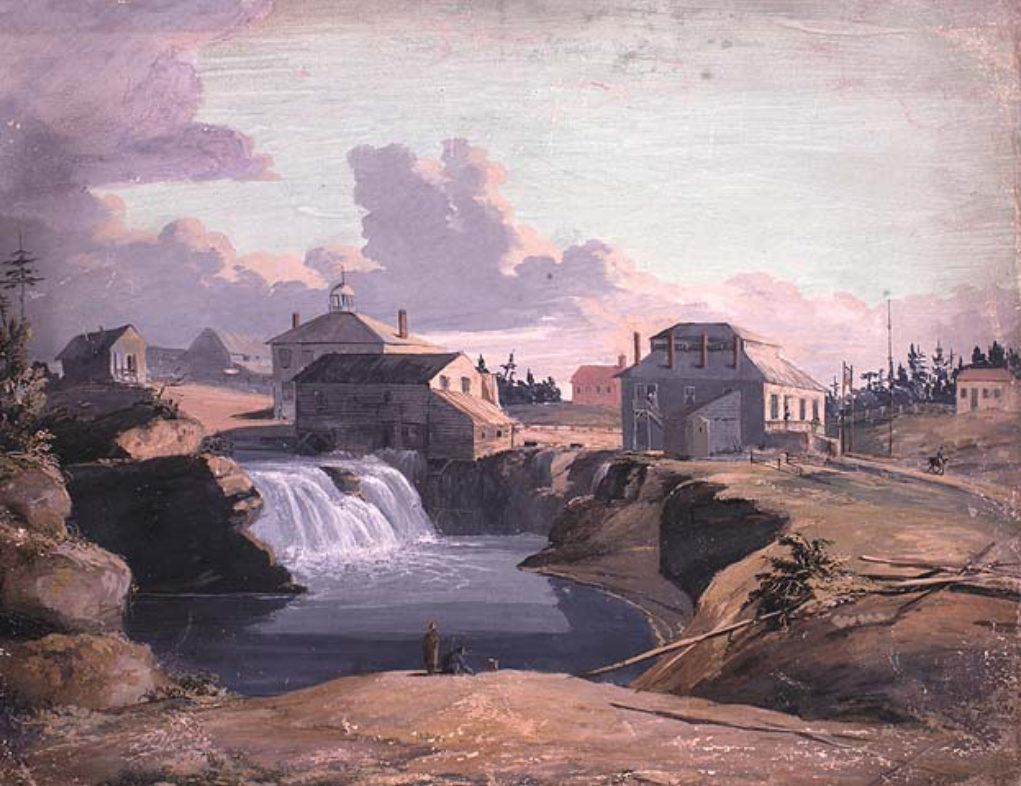
A painting of the mill and tavern in Wright's Town, 1823

The area that would become the National Capital Region was first settled 6,500 years ago by Algonquins, who hunted, foraged, and traded in the area through the European exploration and colonization period. The area remained relatively untouched until 1800, when Wright's Town was established as the first permanent colonial settlement in the Ottawa Valley on what is now the Quebec side of the Ottawa River. At this time and for nearly a century, the principal economic engine of Wright's Town was the Ottawa River timber trade, which saw trees felled in northern Ontario and western Quebec pushed down the Ottawa River and on towards Quebec City for shipment to the United Kingdom and United States.

After the War of 1812, amid U.S. threats to the St. Lawrence River, the British military undertook the Rideau Canal as an alternative, more defensible shipping route, which led to significant growth and land speculation in the area surrounding Wright's Town. In 1827, the settlement on the south side of the river was named Bytown in honour of British military engineer Colonel John By, who was responsible for the entire Rideau Waterway construction project. After the Canal's completion in 1832, Bytown reached a population of 1,000 and was incorporated as a city. Across the river, Wright's Town was incorporated as Hull in 1875 and the historic 1800 settlement was destroyed by fire in 1900.

=== Emergence as the National Capital Region ===
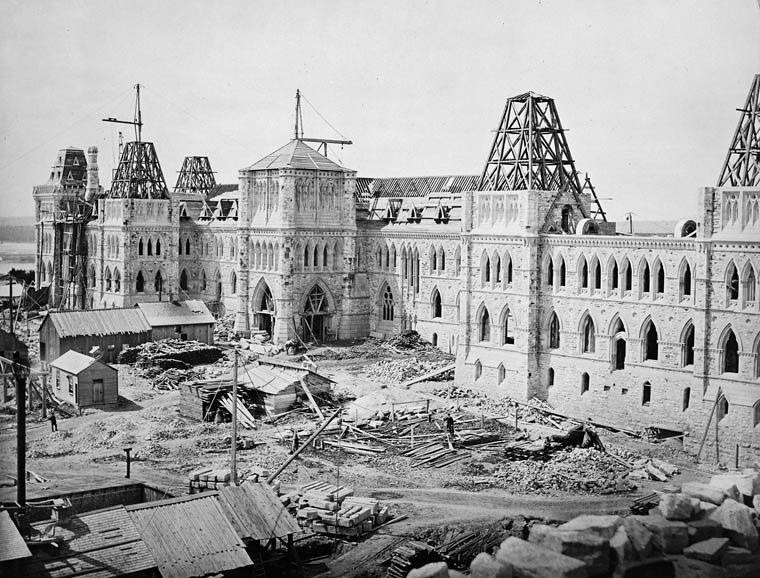
Centre Block under construction in 1863

The selection of Ottawa as the national capital of Canada predates Confederation and was highly contested, requiring more than 200 votes in the parliament of the United Province of Canada and provoking the Stony Monday Riot over local objections to the selection. Tensions between Anglophone Upper Canada and Francophone Lower Canada, difficulties in finding a logistically affordable and feasible capital location, and legislative stalemates all contributed to significant delays in choosing a permanent capital for the United Province of Canada. Although Bytown had been considered as early as 1849, nearly 10 years after the formation of the United Province of Canada, the final decision to establish the city as Canada's capital did not occur until 1857 (by which point it had been renamed to Ottawa). This selection was made by Queen Victoria on the advice of the Governor General of United Canada, Edmund Walker Head, and the choice was ratified by Parliament in 1859.

Construction on the parliament buildings began that December and represented the largest construction project undertaken in North America at the time. The precinct was still incomplete when the United Province of Canada, Nova Scotia, and New Brunswick united to form Canada in 1867. Parliament Hill, as the site is now known, was not completed in full until 1876.

Following the introduction of prohibition laws in Ontario in 1916, Hull became a popular spot for politicians and Ottawa residents to access alcohol legally. Although prohibition in Ontario ended in 1927, Hull's downtown continued to serve as the main entertainment district for the capital region. Hull's night life scene peaked in the mid-20th century, when upscale nightclubs landed performers such as Louis Armstrong and Tony Bennett and the Viva Disco club was named one of Playboy magazine's top ten disco clubs in North America. Wrote Brian Mulroney, "[Ottawa] visibly sagged by ten at night, just in time for residents seeking relief from the stifling boredom to cross the bridge to Hull, Quebec, where nightclubs, dancehalls, bars, and a few great restaurants provided sanctuary and stimulation." By the 1980s, however, Hull topped the list of Quebec municipalities for its high crime rate, and increased concern about the crime issue on the north side of the river led to a significant transformation of the city's downtown. The completion of Place du Portage, a federal office complex, displaced 4,000 residents and much of Hull's bar district, and the development of the Canadian Museum of History in the late 1980s spurred an aggressive zero tolerance policing campaign of what nightlife remained. By 2000, crime had dropped in downtown Hull by 75%, although the physical displacement of much of downtown Hull for federal office buildings had also led to a significant reduction in the downtown population.

=== 21st century ===
In 2022, truckers protesting COVID-19 vaccination requirements for cross-border truckers began a convoy protest that ultimately converged in downtown Ottawa on January 29, 2022. Although not the first attempt to organize a protest to the national capital, the 2022 convoy was successful both in arriving in Ottawa and in staying in the downtown core, blocking major streets with trucks and heavy machinery for nearly a month. The protests also underscored challenges with the National Capital Region's complicated governance structure, as the federal government was forced to rely on the municipal Ottawa Police Service and support from the provincial government to clear the blockade.

In 2024, in an effort to combat stereotypes that Ottawa and the National Capital Region were "the city that fun forgot" and a "sleepy government town," the City of Ottawa hired a night-life commissioner tasked with supporting restaurants, clubs, and other businesses in the night-life sector by shepherding regulatory reform and providing constituency services to businesses navigating the municipal bureaucracy.

== Geography ==
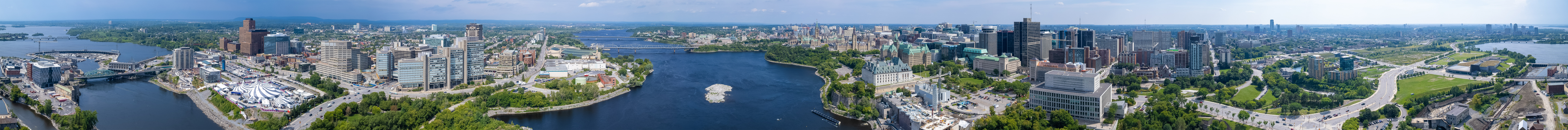
360° view of Ottawa–Gatineau skyline

Ottawa is located in the subregion of Southern Ontario called Eastern Ontario. Gatineau is located in southwestern Quebec. Although overall Ontario is west of Quebec, the boundary in this region is situated in such a way that Gatineau is north of Ottawa, and northwest of the city centre.

The National Capital Region is situated close to where the Canadian Shield and the Saint Lawrence Lowlands intersect. The area has several major fault lines and small earthquakes do occur somewhat regularly, including the 2010 Central Canada earthquake that occurred in Quebec. The Gatineau Hills are the foothills of the Laurentian Mountains and located in the region.

=== Climate ===
The National Capital Region experiences a humid continental climate (Köppen Dfb), with four distinct seasons and is between Zones 5a and 5b on the Canadian Plant Hardiness Scale. In Ottawa, the average July maximum temperature is 26.6 °C (80 °F). The average January minimum temperature is −14.4 °C (6.1 °F). In Gatineau, the average July maximum is 26 °C (78.8 °F) while the average January minimum temperature is −15 °C (5 °F).

== Demographics ==
Most of the National Capital Region is recognized as a bilingual region for federal language-of-work purposes.

In addition, the City of Ottawa has a bilingualism policy, and is declared "officially bilingual" (which required amendments to the provincial law in Ontario) as of 2017. About 19% of the population of the City of Ottawa has French as their first language, while 40% of the total population of the city declares itself fluent in both languages.

As for Gatineau, it is the most bilingual city in Canada, above Montreal. About 64% of the population is able to speak both English and French.

The National Capital Region includes the majority English-speaking (Ottawa) and majority French-speaking (Gatineau) cores. The metro region has a bilingual population of 496,025, an English-only population of 507,175, and a French-only population of 102,375.

In the 2021 Census of Population conducted by Statistics Canada, the Ottawa - Gatineau CMA recorded a population of 1,488,307 living in 604,721 private dwellings, a change of 8.5% from its revised 2016 population of 1,371,576. With a land area of 8,046.99 km^{2} (3,106.96 sq mi), it had a population density of 185.0/km^{2} (479.0/sq mi) in 2021.

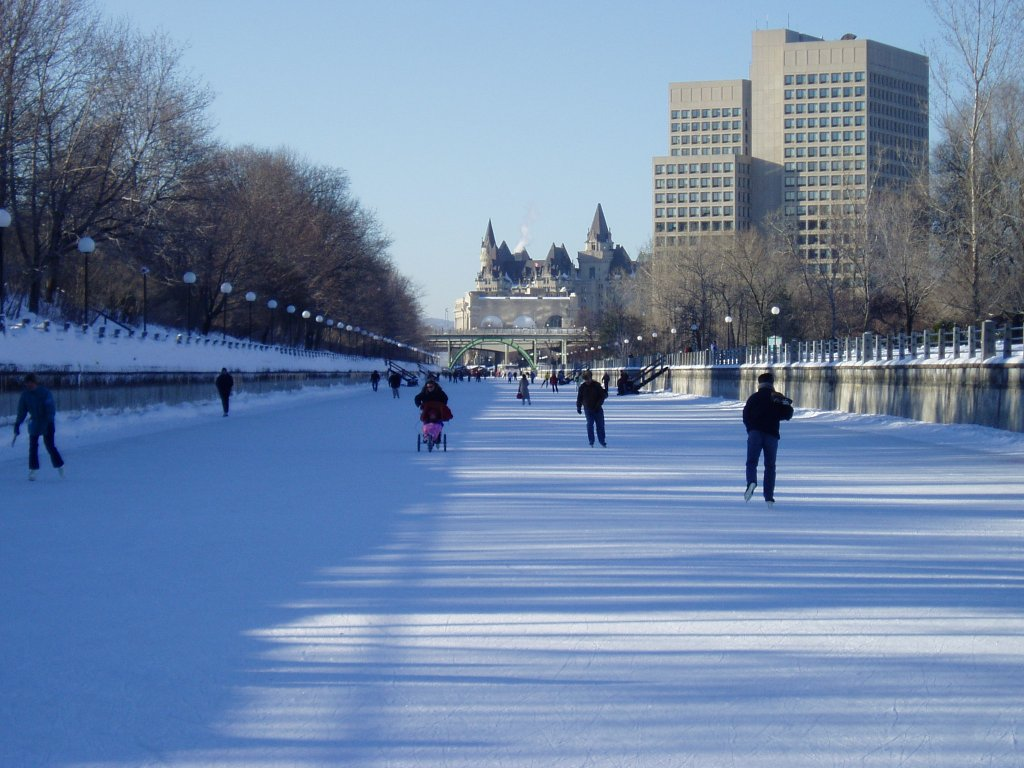
Rideau Canal in Ottawa

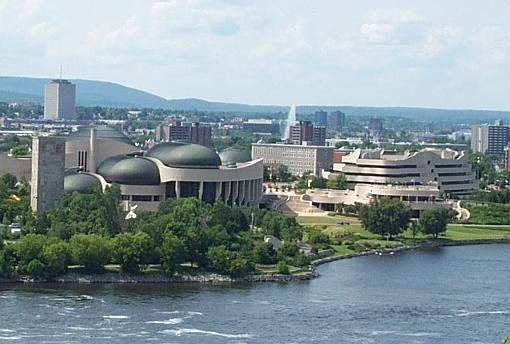
Hull sector of Gatineau

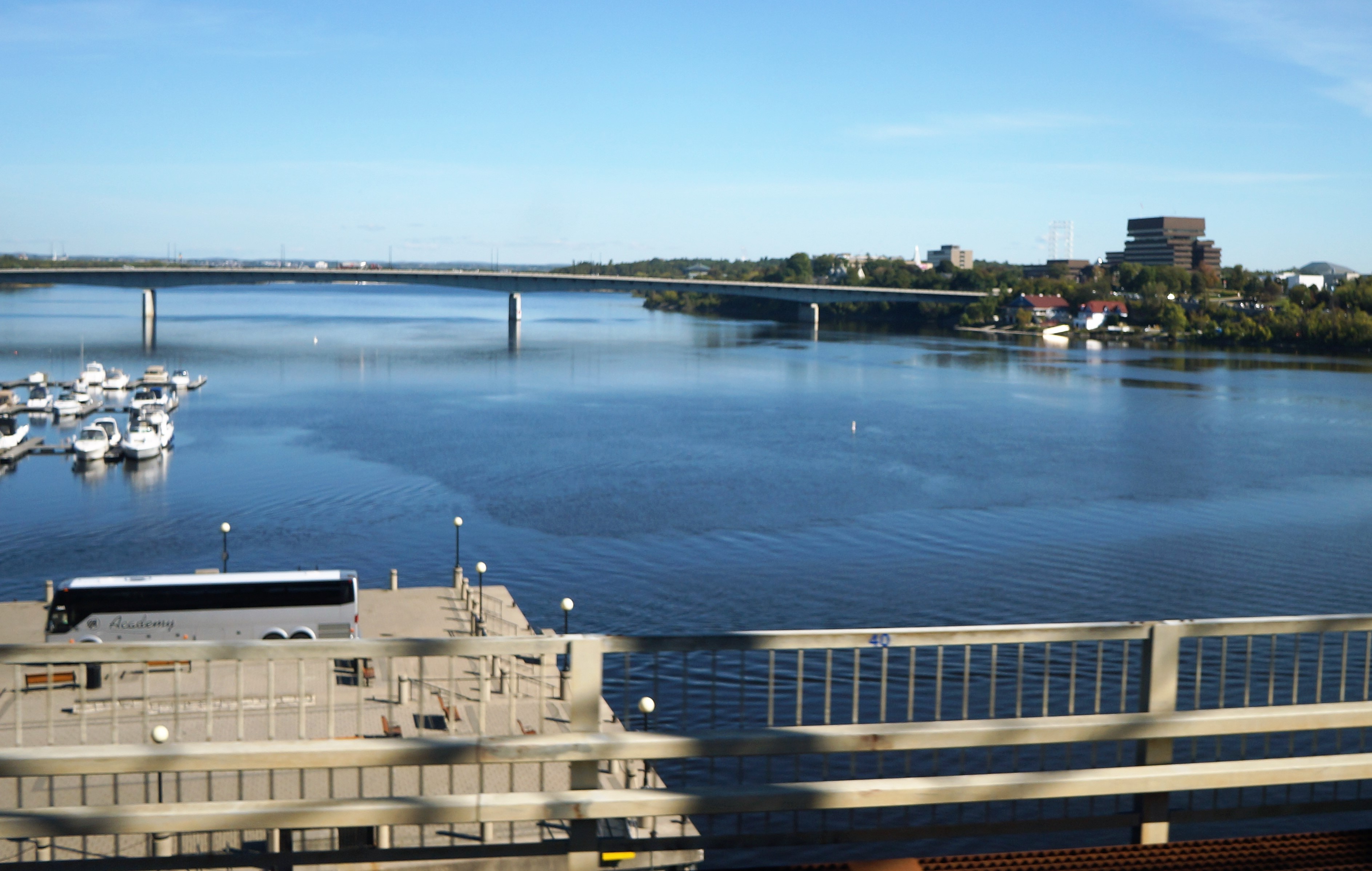
Ottawa-Gatineau le pont du Portage Ottawa

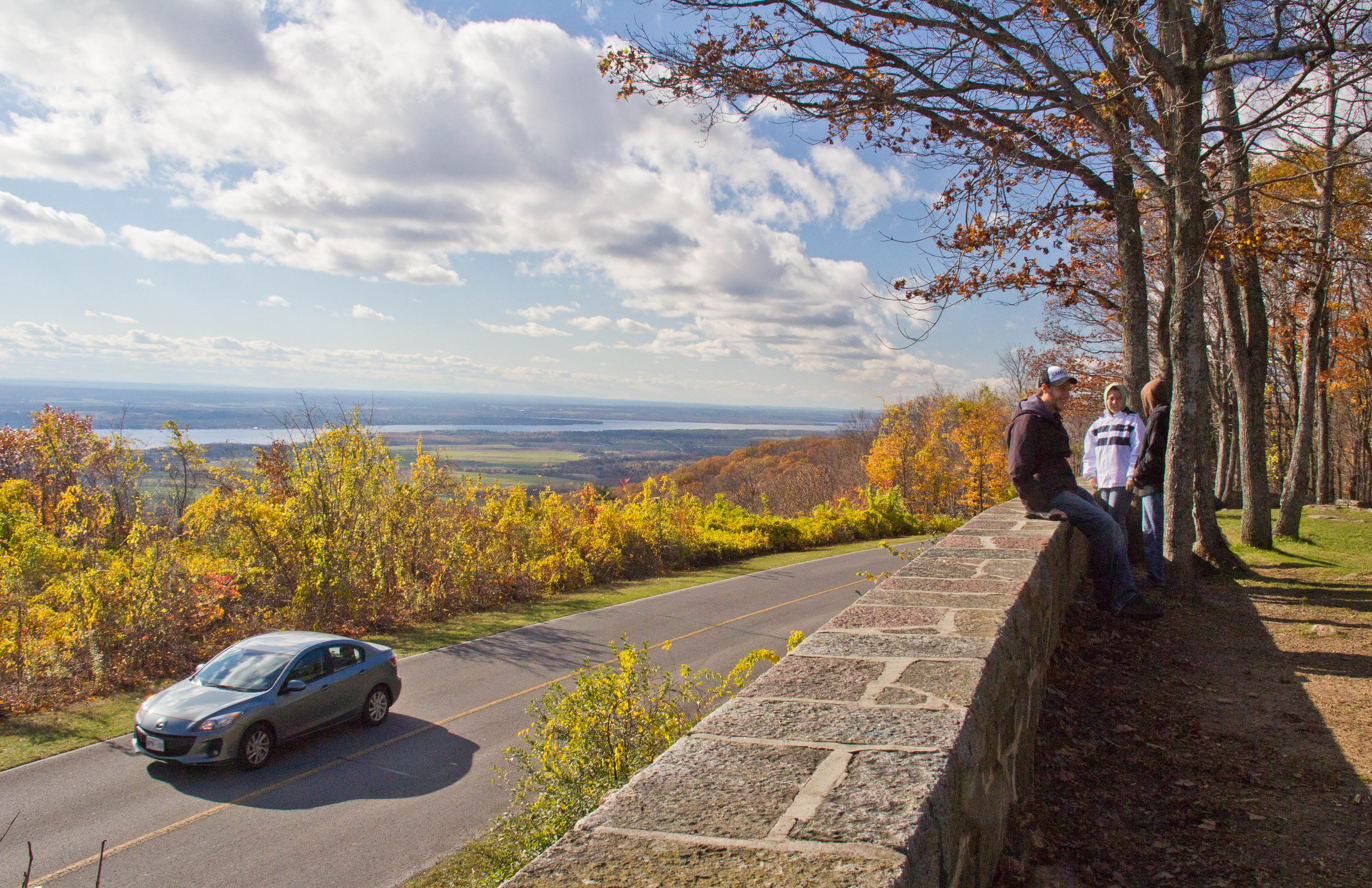
Etienne Brûlé Lookout, Gatineau Park

Ottawa - Gatineau CMA 2021 population by census subdivision
Name	Province	Type	2021 Population	2016 Population	Change
Arnprior	Ontario	Town	9,629	8,795	9.5
Beckwith	Ontario	Township	9,021	7,644	18.0
Bowman	Quebec	Municipality	667	658	1.4
Cantley	Quebec	Municipality	11,449	10,699	7.0
Carleton Place	Ontario	Town	12,517	10,644	17.6
Chelsea	Quebec	Municipality	8,000	6,909	15.8
Clarence-Rockland	Ontario	City	26,505	24,512	8.1
Denholm	Quebec	Municipality	546	505	8.1
Gatineau	Quebec	Ville	291,041	276,245	5.4
La Pêche	Quebec	Municipality	8,636	7,863	9.8
L'Ange-Gardien	Quebec	Municipality	6,102	5,464	11.7
Lochaber	Quebec	Township	446	415	7.5
Lochaber-Partie-Ouest	Quebec	Township	926	856	8.2
Mayo	Quebec	Municipality	704	601	17.1
McNab/Braeside	Ontario	Township	7,591	7,178	5.8
Mississippi Mills	Ontario	Town	14,740	13,163	12.0
Mulgrave-et-Derry	Quebec	Municipality	461	369	24.9
North Grenville	Ontario	Municipality	17,964	16,451	9.2
Notre-Dame-de-la-Salette	Quebec	Municipality	841	727	15.7
Ottawa	Ontario	City	1,017,449	934,243	8.9
Pontiac	Quebec	Municipality	6,142	5,850	5.0
Russell	Ontario	Township	19,598	16,520	18.6
Thurso	Quebec	Ville	3,084	2,818	9.4
Val-des-Bois	Quebec	Municipality	920	865	6.4
Val-des-Monts	Quebec	Municipality	13,328	11,582	15.1
Total CMA	—	—	1,488,307	1,371,576	8.5

== Economy ==
The National Capital Region's economy is heavily reliant on the presence of the federal government, which is heavily centralized in Ottawa and directly or indirectly employs nearly a quarter of the working population in the Ottawa-Gatineau Census Metropolitan Area (which is slightly larger than the National Capital Region). The unemployment rate in 2021 was 7.3%, which is lower than the nationwide average, and the youth unemployment rate (ages 15-24) was 22.6%, slightly higher than the nationwide average. The median after-tax household income in the Ottawa-Gatineau CMA is $84,000, more than ten thousand dollars higher than the national median of $73,000.

=== Federal public service ===
The Canadian federal government is the top employer in the National Capital Region, directly employing 130,611 public servants and 47.6% of all federal employees. Nearly a quarter of the working population is employed in various public administration roles, and a significant part of the private sector economy relies on the presence of federal bureaucrats.

=== Silicon Valley North ===
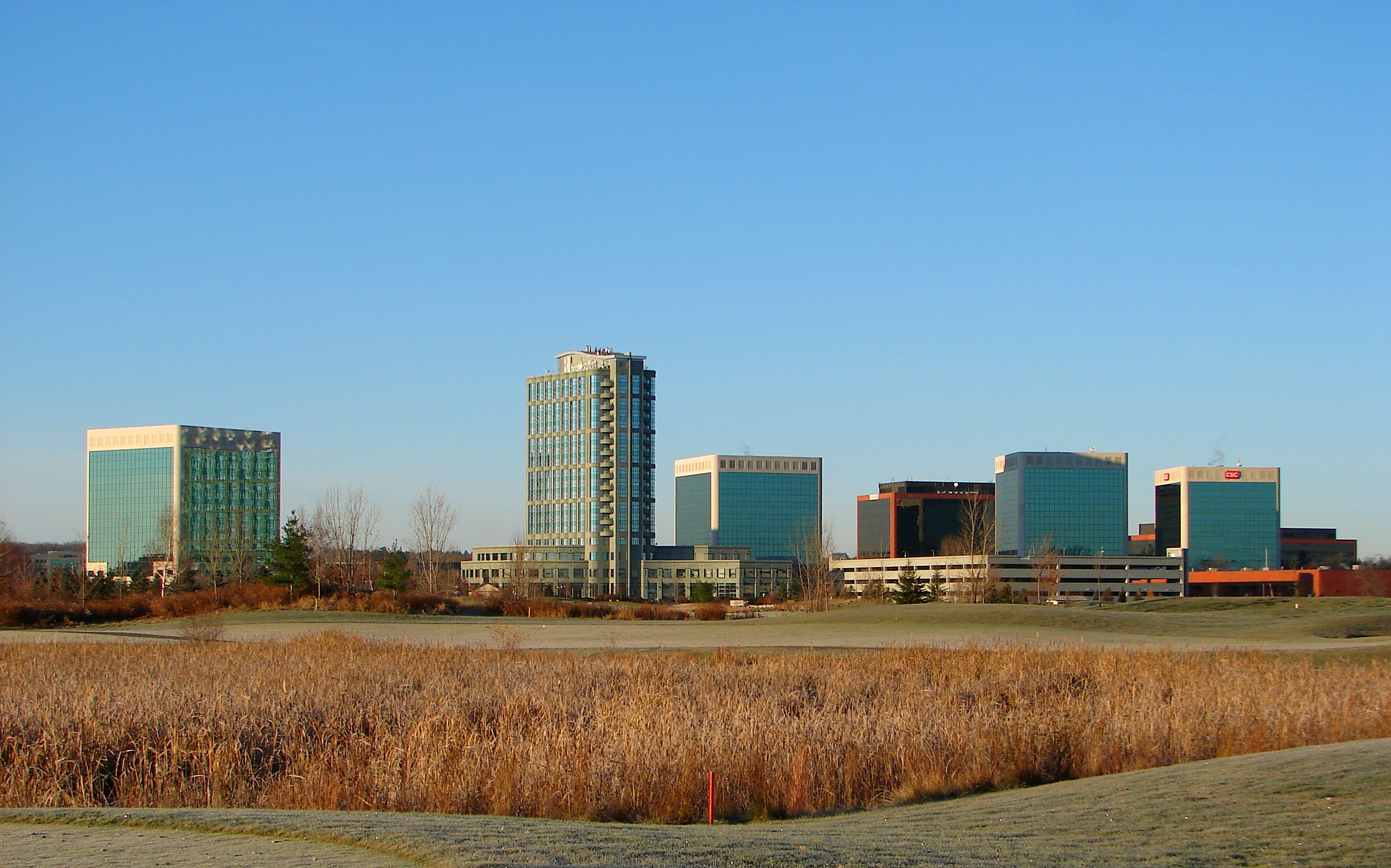
Kanata Research Park, home of Silicon Valley North

During the decade of 1990–2000, the National Capital Region was home to several very successful tech companies, including Nortel Networks, JDS Uniphase, and Newbridge Networks. High-tech employment doubled in five years to reach 80,000 by 2001. With Nortel failing to meet high earnings expectations and layoffs starting in 2002 in the wake of the dot-com bubble, the company started to decline, a devastating shock to the tech industry in Ottawa. Others described it as an 'anchor' for the industry in Ottawa, and an 'incubator' and that without it the Ottawa high-tech industry could not sustain itself.

By the mid-2000s, other Canadian regions were competing for the title of Silicon Valley North. The term was being adopted to refer to the area between Toronto and Kitchener-Waterloo, which is home to Research in Motion (BlackBerry), and offices for Google, Adobe Inc., and Microsoft. Despite this shift, Shopify, Halogen Software, and Kinaxis Inc. remain headquartered in Ottawa, as well as over 1,700 other technology companies. By 2020, nearly 30,000 people in the Ottawa CMA were employed in the technology sector, with most of them being employed in Kanata.

== Governance ==
=== National Capital Commission ===
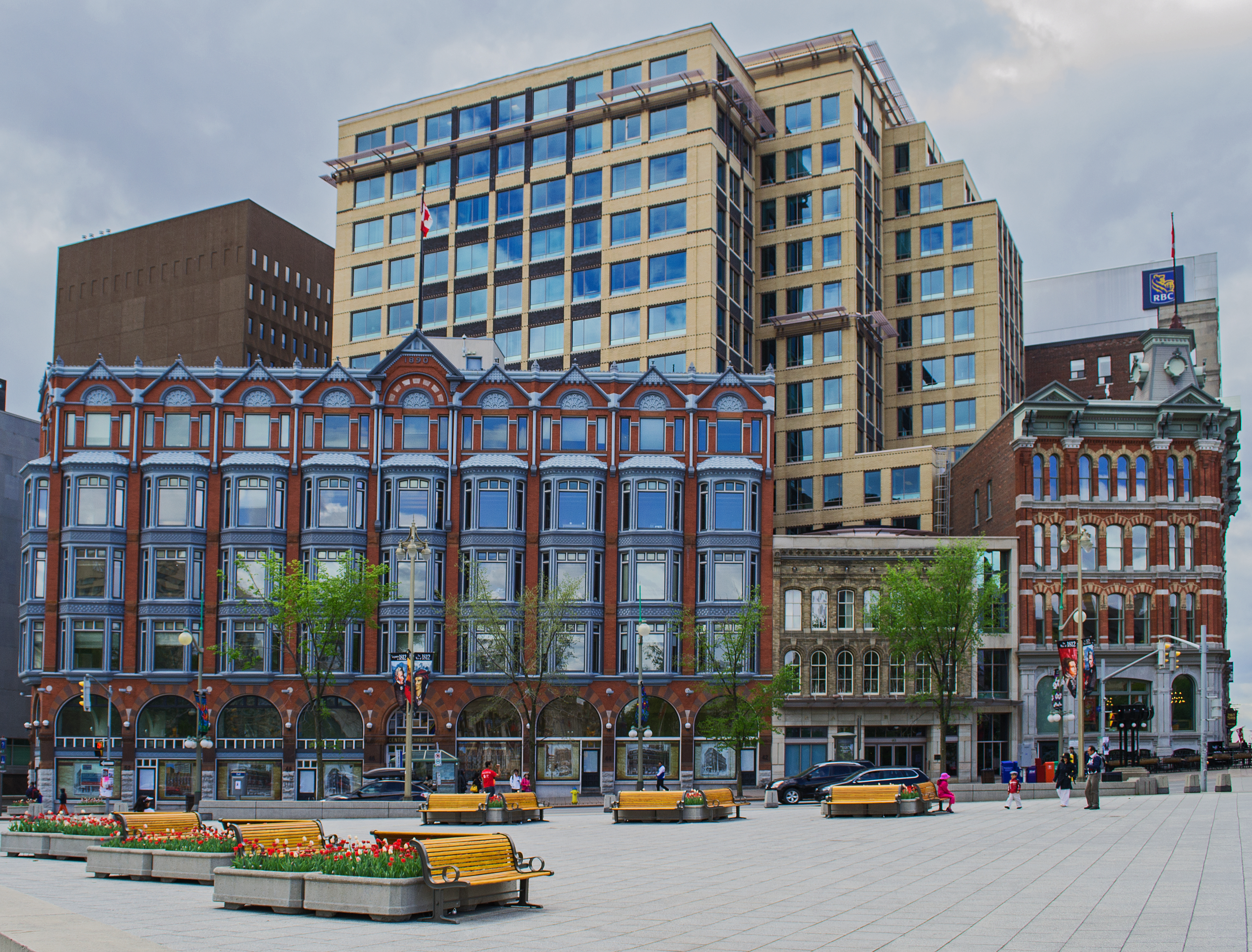
Chambers Building on Elgin Street

The National Capital Commission (NCC) is a corporation established by the Canadian government in 1959 to manage federal buildings and land within the National Capital Region (NCR). While the NCR is not a separate political jurisdiction, the NCC has a mandate to develop the region into a source of pride and unity for Canadians by engaging in political, cultural, and land use planning matters that are typically powers reserved for the provincial government under the Constitution of Canada. In the Supreme Court of Canada case of Munro v. National Capital Commission, it was determined that the NCC has authority to be involved in zoning matters in the NCR.

In 2006, the NCC completed work on Confederation Boulevard, a ceremonial route connecting key attractions in the NCR on both sides of the Ottawa River. The NCC River House, originally constructed in 1914, underwent substantial restoration from 2019 to July 2023. It is located adjacent to the Ottawa River near the Sir George-Étienne Cartier Parkway.

The NCC reports to Parliament through the Minister of Heritage, and is governed by the National Capital Act. Its headquarters are in the Chambers Building on Elgin Street, between Queen and Sparks Streets.

=== Capital district proposals ===
Proposals have been made to separate the National Capital Region and establish it as a distinct capital district, similar to the District of Columbia or the Australian Capital Territory. These gained attention during periods when the Parti Québécois held power in Quebec, particularly due to the federalist inclination of the Hull/Gatineau area. However, any potential federal support waned after the 1995 Quebec referendum, where the predominantly federalist vote in Hull/Gatineau significantly influenced the outcome. Recent efforts for a separate capital district haven't gained momentum, with no active movement as of 2024.

== Attractions ==
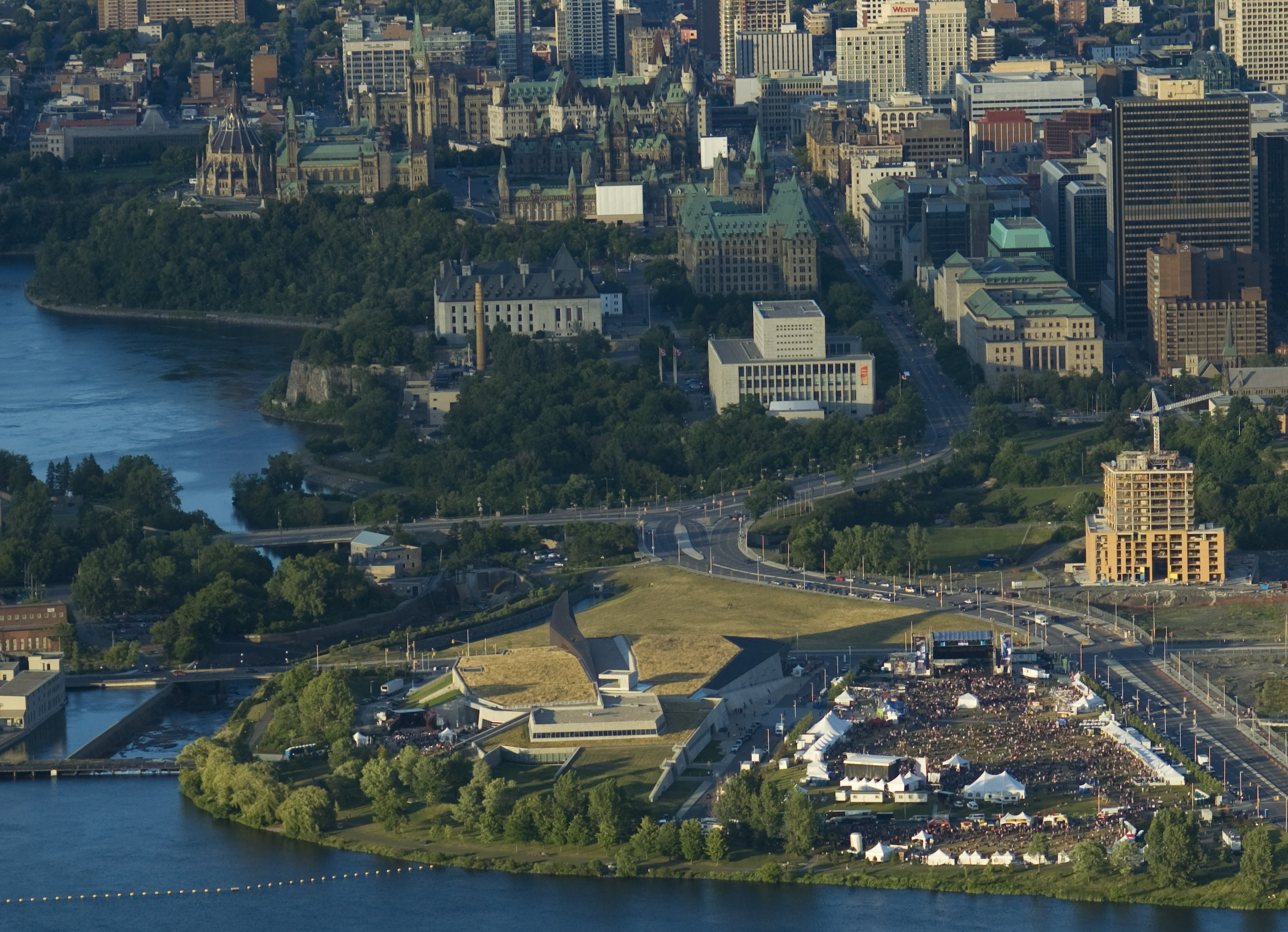
Bluesfest in LeBreton Flats, Ottawa

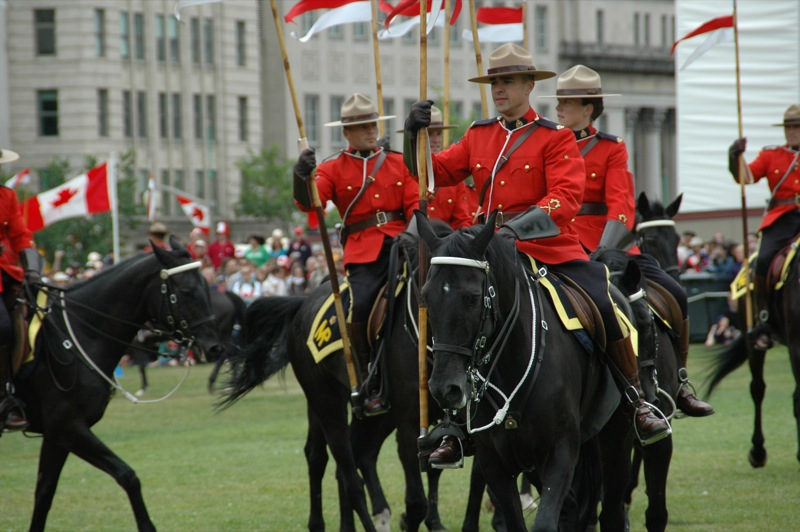
The Musical Ride performance on Parliament Hill in Ottawa during Canada Day

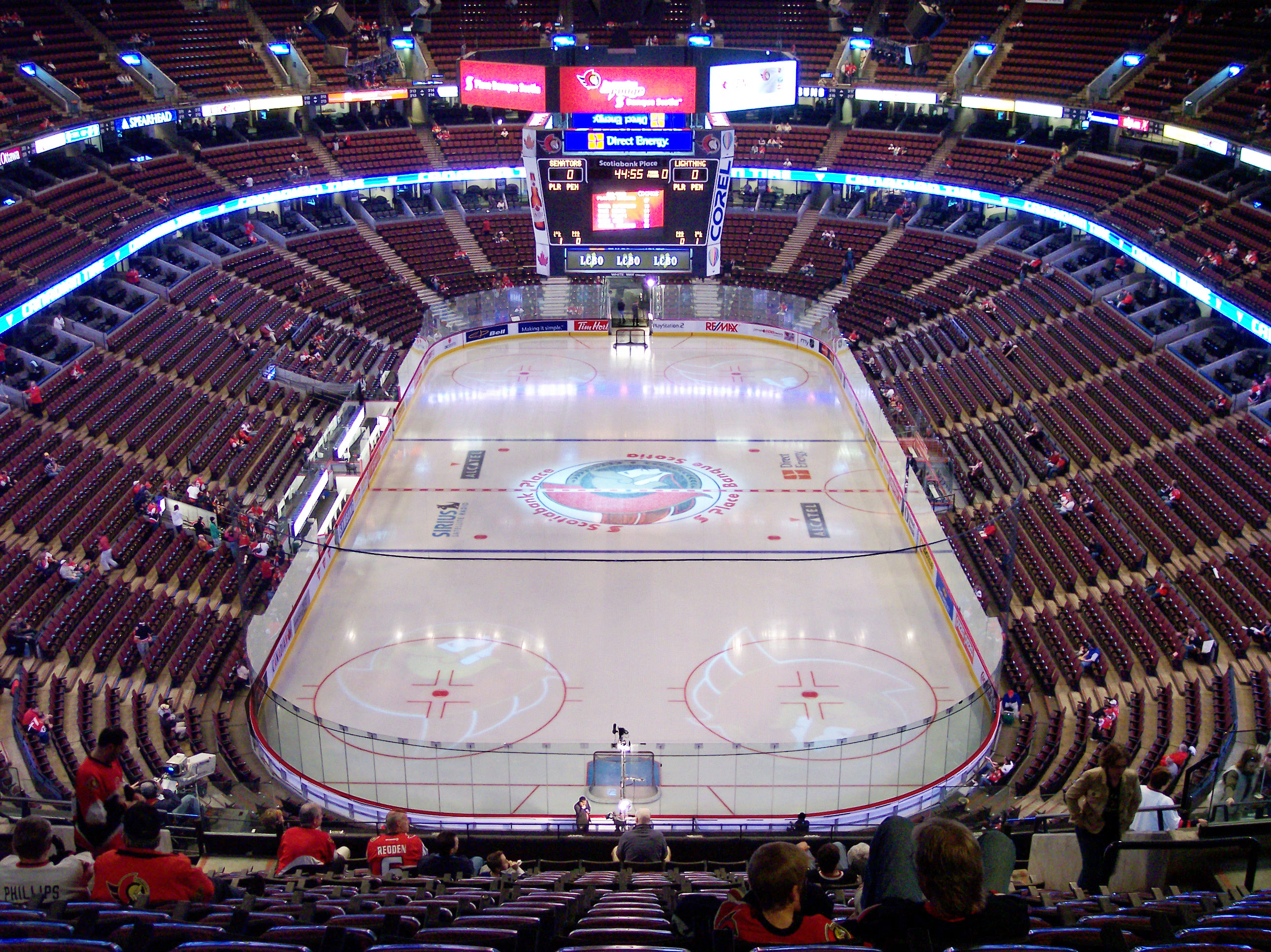
Canadian Tire Centre in Kanata, in the western part of the City of Ottawa

The National Capital Region (NCR) has numerous attractions, including festivals, national museums, iconic buildings, sports, and entertainment. Ottawa is known for its examples of Gothic Revival architecture.

=== Festivals ===
Annual events include the music festival Bluesfest, winter festival Winterlude, the Canadian Tulip Festival, Capital Pride, RCMP Musical Ride, Gatineau Hot Air Balloon Festival, Buskers festival, and the largest Canada Day celebrations in the nation.

=== Built heritage ===
The region hosts several national museums, such as the Canadian Museum of History, Canadian War Museum, Canadian Museum of Nature, Canada Science and Technology Museum, National Art Gallery, and Canada Aviation Museum.

Prominent buildings include Parliament Hill, the Prime Minister's home 24 Sussex Drive, the Governor General's home Rideau Hall, the Canadian Museum of History, the National Gallery of Canada, the Supreme Court of Canada, the Royal Canadian Mint, the American Embassy, and the National Library.

There are 29 National Historic Sites of Canada within the National Capital Region, including landmarks like the Former Almonte Post Office and Rosamond Woollen Mill in Almonte, the Gillies Grove and House in Arnprior, the Manoir Papineau in Montebello and the Symmes Hotel in the Aylmer sector of Gatineau.

=== Sports and entertainment ===
The NCR is home to various sports teams, including the Ottawa Senators (NHL), Ottawa Charge (PWHL), Ottawa Redblacks (CFL), and Atlético Ottawa (CPL). The Ottawa 67's (OHL) and Quebec Maritimes Junior Hockey League (QMJHL).

Universities like Carleton University and the University of Ottawa compete in U Sports, with teams like the Carleton Ravens and Ottawa Gee-Gees achieving national recognition. Gatineau's Université du Québec en Outaouais offers a range of sports activities at its large sports centre where you can practice a multitude of sports like Yoga, Zumba and more. Algonquin College has also won numerous national championships.

== Transportation ==
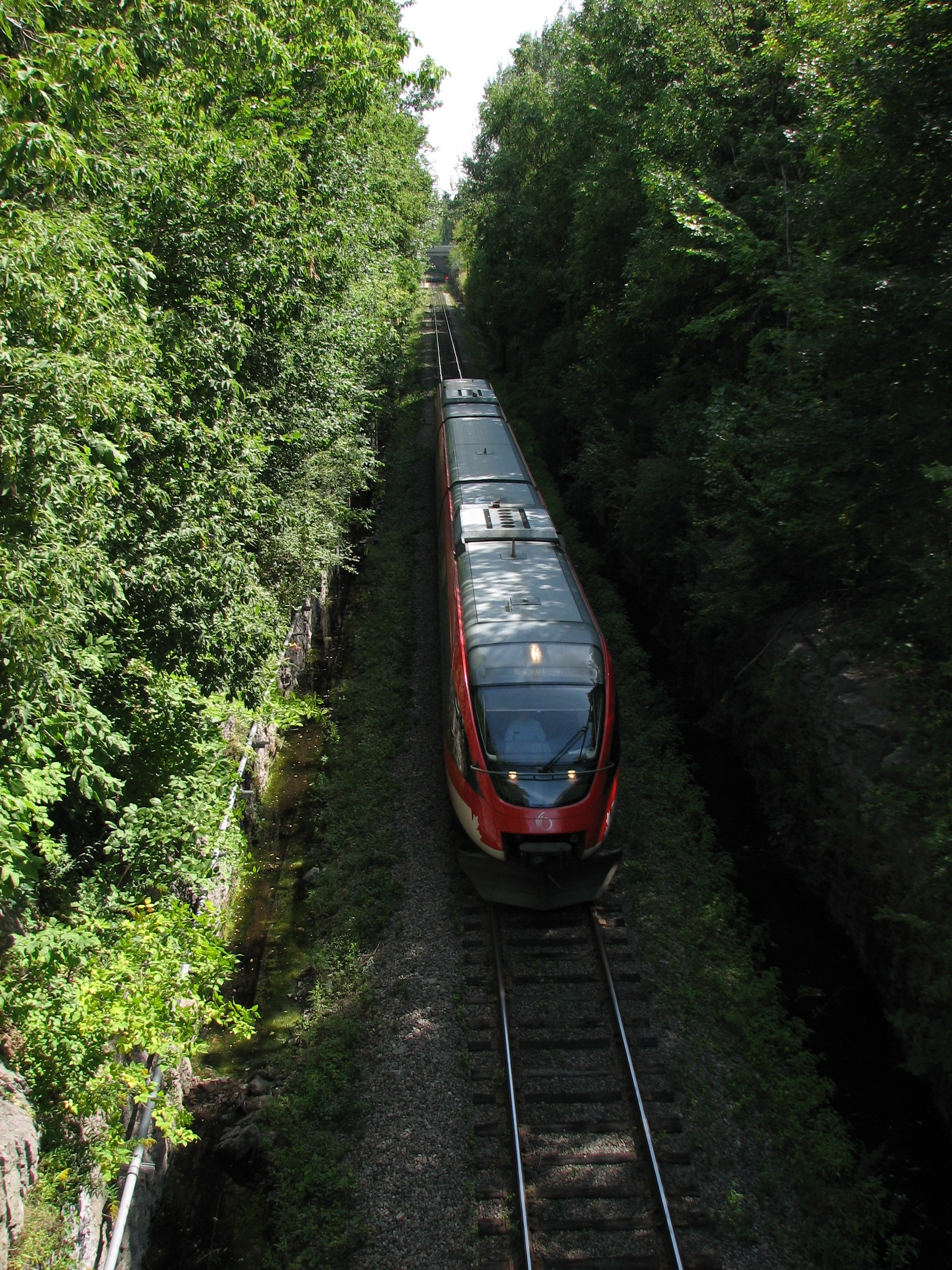
Line 2 of Ottawa's O-Train light rail

The National Capital Region (NCR) has several major freeways including the 417, Ontario Highway 416, Quebec Autoroute 5, Quebec Autoroute 50, Regional Road 174, and Highway 7 in Ontario.

The 417 is Ottawa's east–west commuter expressway. It begins at the Ontario-Quebec border (continuing the route of Quebec Autoroute 40), reaches the urban portion of Ottawa at the 417-174 split, bisects the urban area, and continues westward to just beyond the city boundary where it gives way to Highway 17 in Renfrew County.

The 416 starts at the 401 near the Ogdensburg-Prescott International Bridge and continues north for 75 km until it ends at the 417 in Ottawa's west end.

The freeway section of Highway 7 branches off the 417 in Ottawa's west end near Stittsville and is currently undergoing a 4-lane expansion to reach the eastern fringe of Carleton Place at McNeely Avenue.

Public transportation is handled by OC Transpo on the Ontario side, and the STO on the Quebec side. Together they serve a population over 1,130,761 and have an estimated annual ridership of over 113.2 million.

OC Transpo operates a light rail (LRT) system named the O-Train with three lines in operation. Line 2 is a north–south line using diesel-powered units and has just over 2 million riders per year. Line 1 links the western suburbs and the eastern suburbs via downtown, and uses electrically powered light-rail vehicles. Line 1 is 12.5 km long with 13 stations, 3 of which are underground in downtown Ottawa. There is a proposed tramway system in Gatineau that would connect with lines 1 and 2 in Ottawa.

Gatineau's bus transitway, the Rapibus, commenced operation in October 2013.

OC Transpo has about 1,050 buses which run on city streets and an expansive Transitway. The STO has around 300 buses that serve the Quebec side of the Ottawa River, some routes crossing into downtown Ottawa.

Ottawa Macdonald–Cartier International Airport serves as the primary international airport for the NCR. In 2023, it accommodated over 4 million passengers, ranking it as the sixth busiest airport in Canada and the second busiest in Ontario. The airport provides non-stop flights to various destinations in Canada, the United States, the Caribbean, and Europe. Additionally, it is a key component of some of the nation's busiest air routes, offering hourly flights to and from Montreal-Pierre Elliott Trudeau International Airport and Toronto Pearson International Airport.

== Area codes ==
The National Capital Region uses 613, 343, and 753 on the Ontario side of the Ottawa River, while 819, 873, and 468 are used on the Quebec side.

For most of the second half of the 20th century, it was possible to make a call between Ottawa and Hull with only seven digits since the two cities were a single rate centre. An exchange protection scheme was implemented to preserve seven-digit dialing between the two cities. However, it was implemented in a way that if a 613 number was in use in Ottawa, the corresponding 819 number could not be used anywhere in western Quebec. Likewise, if an 819 number was in use in Hull, the corresponding 613 number could not be used anywhere in eastern Ontario. With the implementation of ten-digit local dialing since 2006, this practice has ceased. Despite this, a "dual dialability" system remains for federal government numbers, allowing for seamless communication across the provincial border.

North American telephone customers placing calls to Ottawa or Gatineau may not recognise the charge details on their bills. The incumbent local exchange carrier on both sides of the river, Bell Canada, continues to split Ottawa between 11 rate centres and Gatineau between five. The "Ottawa-Hull" rate centre only covers the areas that were the cities of Ottawa and Hull before the formation of the "megacities" of Ottawa and Gatineau, plus a few close-in suburbs.

== Newspapers ==
Three main daily local newspapers are printed in Ottawa: two English newspapers, the Ottawa Citizen and the Ottawa Sun, and one French newspaper, Le Droit.

== See also ==
- Eastern Ontario
- List of diplomatic missions in Ottawa
- List of tallest buildings in Ottawa–Gatineau
- Outaouais
- Southern Ontario
