= 1989–90 Rugby Union County Championship =

English rugby union competition

1989–90 Toshiba County Championship
- Countries: England
- Champions: Lancashire (14th title)
- Runners-up: Middlesex

The 1989–90 Toshiba Rugby Union County Championship was the 90th edition of England's County Championship rugby union club competition.

Lancashire won their 14th title after defeating Middlesex in the final.

== First round ==
Pos	Northern Division	P	W	D	L	F	A	Pts
1	Lancashire	5	4	0	1	139	35	8
2	Yorkshire	5	4	0	1	121	77	8
3	Northumberland	5	3	1	1	80	43	7
4	Cumbria	5	2	0	3	89	134	4
5	Durham	5	1	1	3	79	102	3
6	Cheshire	5	0	0	5	40	159	0

Pos	Midlands Group A	P	W	D	L	F	A	Pts
1	Staffordshire	2	2	0	0	30	18	4
2	North Midlands	2	1	0	1	37	38	2
3	Leicestershire	2	0	0	2	35	46	0

Pos	Midlands Group B	P	W	D	L	F	A	Pts
1	Notts, Lincs & Derby	2	2	0	0	25	20	4
2	Warwickshire	2	1	0	1	34	26	2
3	East Midlands	2	0	0	2	18	31	0

Pos	London Group A	P	W	D	L	F	A	Pts
1	Middlesex	2	2	0	0	39	21	4
2	Hertfordshire	2	0	1	1	30	31	1
3	Kent	2	0	1	1	9	26	1

Pos	London Group B	P	W	D	L	F	A	Pts
1	Hampshire	3	3	0	0	48	11	6
2	Eastern Counties	3	2	0	1	53	26	4
3	Surrey	3	1	0	2	38	45	2
4	Sussex	3	0	0	3	22	79	0

Pos	South-West Division 1	P	W	D	L	F	A	Pts
1	Cornwall	3	2	1	0	106	34	5
2	Berkshire	3	1	1	1	35	33	3
3	Gloucestershire	3	1	0	2	53	69	2
4	Dorset & Wilts	3	1	0	2	32	90	2

== Second round ==
Team one	Team two	Score
Notts, Lincs & Derby	North Midlands	7-29
Staffordshire	Warwickshire	19-23

== Third round ==
Team one	Team two	Score
Middlesex	Hampshire	16-13
North Midlands	Warwickshire	12-29

== Semifinals ==
Date	Venue	Team one	Team two	Score
3 Mar	Redruth	Cornwall	Middlesex+	15-15
3 Mar	Orrell	Lancashire	Warwickshire	26-14

+ won by virtue of scoring more tries

== Final ==
7 April 1990

Lancashire	32–9	Middlesex
Try: Morris (3), Hanavan (2); Con: Strett (2), Langford; Pen: Strett (2)		Try: Penalty try Con: Robinson; Pen: Robinson

Twickenham
Attendance: 7,000
Referee: Ian Bullerwell (East Midlands)

S Langford	Orrell
Nigel Heslop	Orrell
B Wellens	Liverpool St Helens
M Fielden	Fylde
Brendan Hanavan	Fylde
M Strett	Orrell
Dewi Morris	Liverpool St Helens
M Hynes	Orrell
N Hitchen	Orrell
Sammy Southern (capt)	Orrell
Bob Kimmins	Orrell
David Cusani	Orrell
Sean Gallager	Waterloo
C Cusani	Orrell
P Manley	Orrell

S Robinson	Saracens
M Wedderburn	Harlequins
G Leleu	London Welsh
Rob Lozowski	Wasps
Simon Smith	Wasps
Adrian Thompson	Harlequins
Floyd Steadman (capt)	Saracens
G Holmes	Wasps
J McFarland	Saracens
P Curtis	Harlequins
J Fowler	Richmond
S Dear	Rosslyn Park
Chris Sheasby	Harlequins
L Adamson	Saracens
Mark Rigby	Wasps
Replacements:
M Hobley	Coventry (for Curtis)

== See also ==
- English rugby union system
- Rugby union in England
