= Ann Robinson (disambiguation) =

Ann or Anne Robinson may refer to:

- Ann Robinson (1929–2025), American actress
- Ann Robinson (artist) (born 1944), New Zealand artist
- Ann Turner Robinson (died 1741), English soprano
- Anne Robinson (born 1944), British television presenter
- Anne G. Robinson, Canadian operations researcher and business executive
- Anne Marjorie Robinson (1858–1924), British painter and sculptor

== See also ==
- Annie Robinson, RMS Titanic crew member and survivor
- James and Anne Robinson Nature Center, in Columbia, Maryland
- Annie Robinson-Pappas, fictional character in 2016 Australian television soap opera Neighbours
- Robinson (disambiguation)
