= Anne Giardini =

Canadian business executive, journalist, lawyer and writer

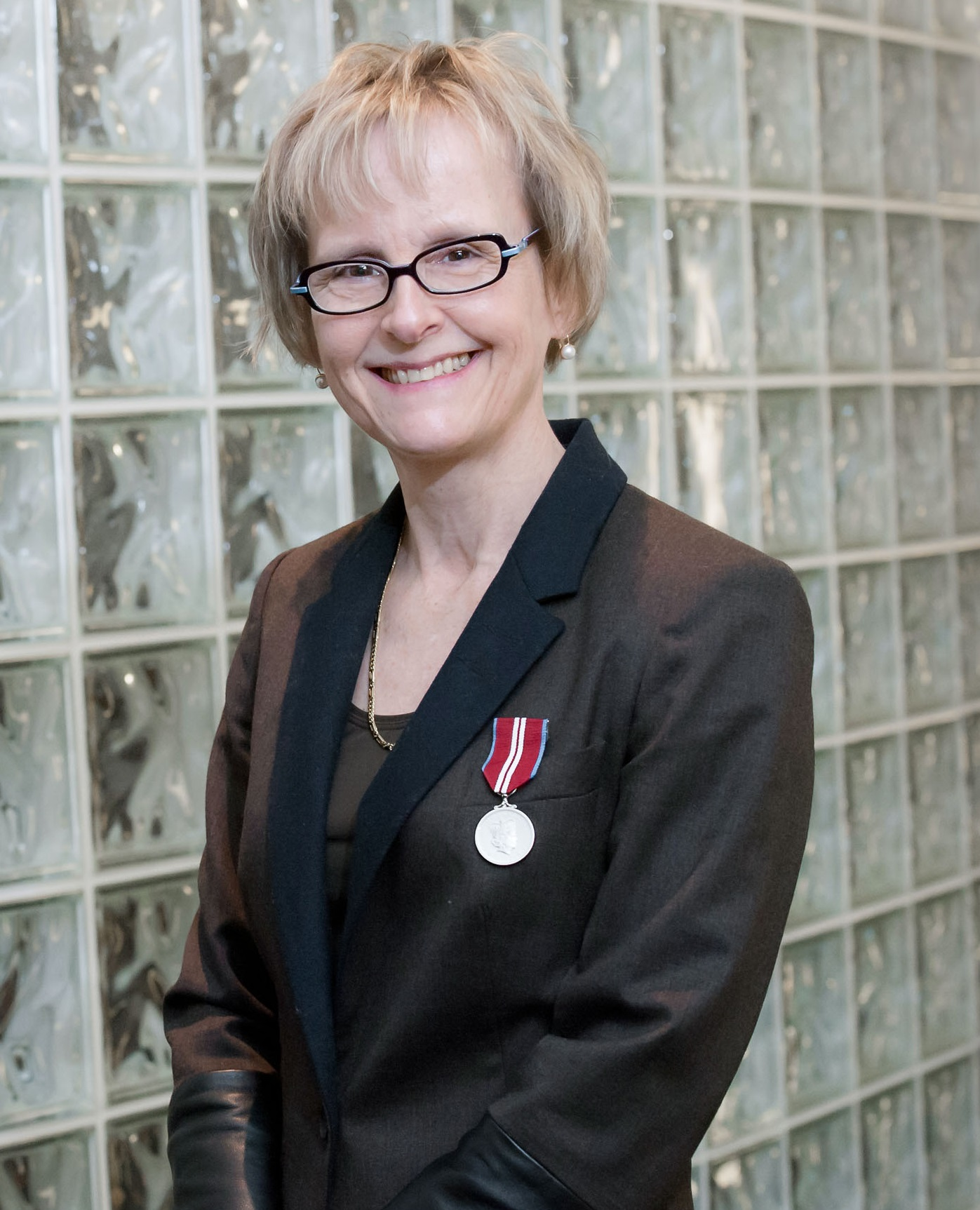
- Giardini in 2013
- Born: 1959 (age 66–67); Weston, Ontario, Canada
- Occupations: Business executive, journalist, lawyer, writer

Anne Giardini, OC, OBC, KC (born 1959) is a Canadian lawyer, business executive, university administrator, community advocate, and writer. She is the oldest daughter of late Canadian novelist Carol Shields. Giardini was called to the British Columbia bar in 1985, the Bar of Ontario in 1990, and the Washington State bar in 2009. She served as the 11th chancellor of Simon Fraser University from 2014 to 2020. She lives in Vancouver, British Columbia with her husband of more than 30 years. They have three grown children.

Giardini was a columnist for the National Post from 1998 to 2001. She has authored two novels, The Sad Truth about Happiness (2005) and Advice for Italian Boys (2009), both published by HarperCollins. In 2016, Giardini and her son, Nicholas Giardini, were co-editors of Startle and Illuminate, a literary anthology from the archives of Carol Shields, published by Random House Canada.

From 2008 to 2014, Giardini served as president of Weyerhaeuser's Canadian subsidiary, Weyerhaeuser Company Ltd. Giardini joined Weyerhaeuser as legal counsel in 1994 and was appointed to vice president in 2006.

Giardini is an active volunteer and has been a board member of several Vancouver-based non-profits. She has served as the Chair of the Greater Vancouver Board of Trade, Chair of the Vancouver International Writers Festival, Director of the BC Achievement Foundation, Deputy Chair of the Board of Governors of Simon Fraser University, and as a member of the Board of UniverCity. She is also a supporter of the Vancouver YWCA's Women of Distinction Awards and has volunteered as an event panelist for the Young Women in Business Network.

Giardini has served on the board of numerous companies and organizations, including Thompson Creek Metals, Translink, WWF-Canada, Hydro One, the Pembina Institute, and the CMHC. Presently, she is a Director for Stella-Jones Inc. and Capstone Copper, as well as a Chair of K92 Mining Inc.

Giardini was awarded a Queen Elizabeth II Diamond Jubilee Medal in January 2013 for her fundraising efforts for Plan Canada's Because I Am a Girl campaign, which supports females in Tanzania. In 2016, Giardini was appointed an Officer of the Order of Canada. In 2018, she was appointed an Officer of the Order of British Columbia.

== Education ==
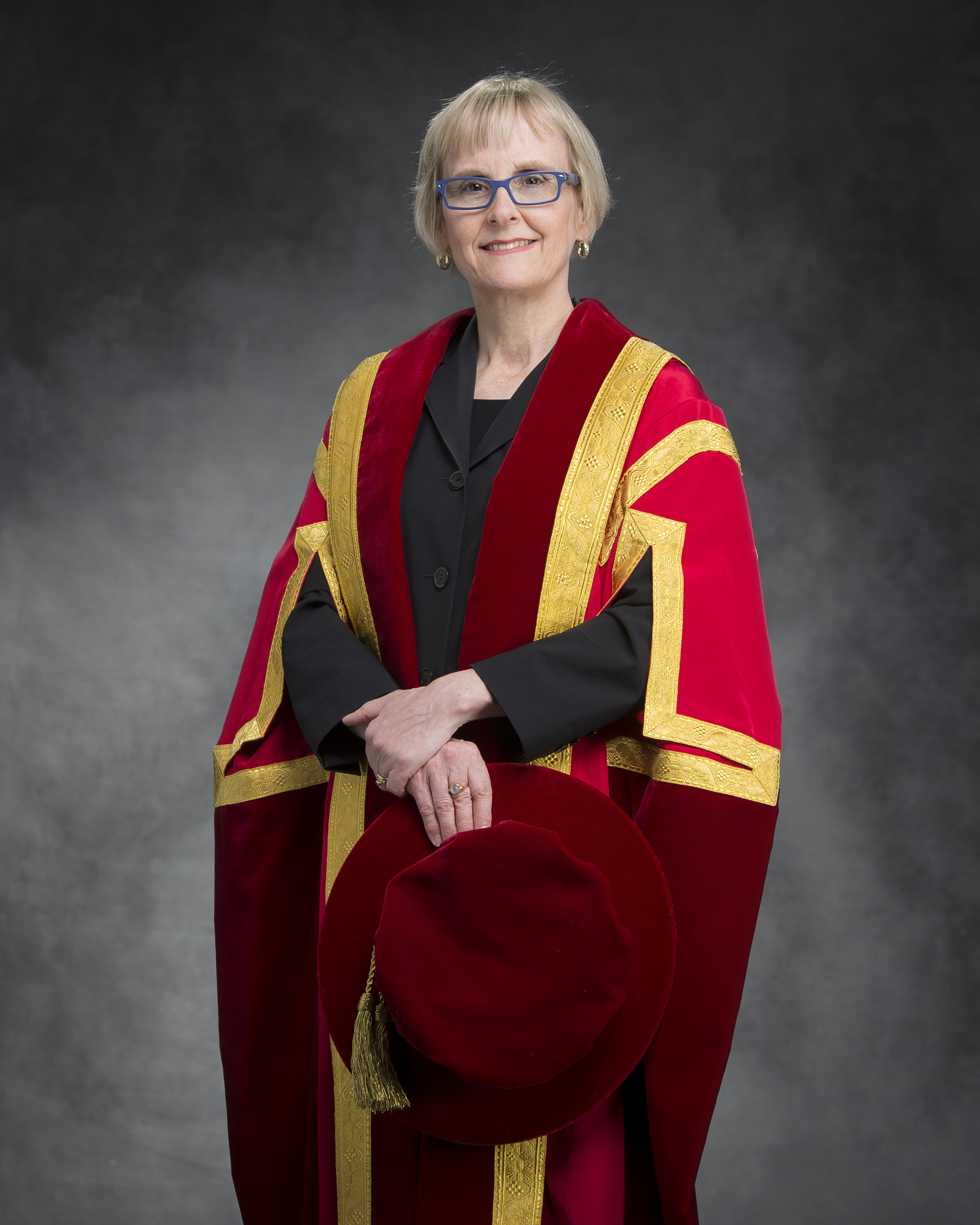
Giardini in 2014

- Simon Fraser University — BA, Economics (1980)
- The University of British Columbia, Allard Law — LLB (1984)
- Cambridge University, Trinity Hall — LLM (1988)

== Bibliography ==
- The Sad Truth about Happiness (HarperCollins, 2005)
- Advice for Italian Boys (HarperCollins, 2009)
- Startle and Illuminate (Random House, 2016) (edited with Nicholas Giardini)

== Awards ==
- Shortlisted for the Amazon Canada First Novel Award, 2005
- Winner of the Audie Awards, 2007
- Appointed King's Counsel, 2010
