= Fortuna Mining =

Canadian mining company

Fortuna Mining Corp.
- Type: Public
- Traded as: NYSE: FSM; TSX: FVI; S&P/TSX Composite Component
- Industry: Mining
- Founded: 2005
- Founder: Simon Ridgway; Mario Szotlender; Jorge Ganoza
- Headquarters: Corporate office: Vancouver, Canada Latin America head office: Lima, Peru West Africa head office: Abidjan, Côte d’Ivoire, Canada
- Key people: David Laing (Chairman); Jorge Ganoza ((Chief executive officer, President, and Director)
- Products: Gold, silver, lead, and zinc
- Website: Official Website

Fortuna Mining Corp., formerly Fortuna Silver Mines Inc., is a Canada-based precious metals mining company with current operations and exploration activities in Argentina, Côte d'Ivoire, and Peru and exploration and development activities in Senegal. The Company is primarily engaged in producing gold and silver with by-products lead and zinc. Fortuna’s operating mines are the Séguéla Mine, Lindero Mine, and Caylloma Mine. In 2025, Fortuna divested its San Jose Mine in Mexico and Yaramoko Mine in Burkina Faso. The Company produced approximately 317,000 gold equivalent ounces in 2025.[1]

== History ==
Fortuna was founded in 2005 by Simon Ridgway, Mario Szotlender, and Jorge Ganoza. Ganoza is a fourth-generation miner from a Peruvian family that has owned and operated several gold, silver, and base metals mines.

Fortuna acquired its underground Caylloma silver-lead-zinc mine in 2005, which started production in 2006. Also in 2006, it acquired a 76 percent stake in the San Jose silver-gold Project in Oaxaca, Mexico, which would become the San Jose Mine. Construction on the underground mine began in 2010, with production starting in 2011.

In 2010, Fortuna migrated from the TSX Venture Exchange to the Toronto Stock Exchange (TSX: FVI). The following year, Fortuna began trading on the New York Stock Exchange (NYSE: FSM).

In 2016, Fortuna acquired Goldrock Mines, an acquisition that included the open pit Lindero Gold Project in Argentina. In September 2017, the company announced it would move forward with construction, and in 2020, the Lindero Mine poured first gold.

In 2021, Fortuna expanded its reach beyond the Americas by acquiring West Africa-focused mining company Roxgold, including the underground Yaramoko Gold Mine in Burkina Faso and the advanced open-pit Séguéla Gold Project in Côte d'Ivoire, which became Fortuna’s fifth operating mine when it poured its first gold in May 2023.

In September 2023, Fortuna acquired Chesser Resources, including the Diamba Sud Gold Project in Senegal, one of the new and emerging gold discoveries in the region, further expanding Fortuna’s presence in West Africa.

In 2024, the company rebranded as Fortuna Mining to reflect their transition away from silver production. In early2025, the company said that it's West Africa gold mining operations made up two-thirds of the business, and they sold the San Jose silver mine in Mexico.

In April 2025, Fortuna completed the sale of the San Jose Mine in Mexico, which had been scheduled for progressive closure during the year. The company also divested the Yaramoko Mine in Burkina Faso, where exploration activities had already concluded, marking Fortuna’s full exit from the country.In October 2025, Fortuna reported the results of a Preliminary Economic Assessment for its Diamba Sud Gold Project in Senegal, followed by the release of a supporting technical report in November.

== Current Operations ==
As of 2025, Fortuna has three operating mines.

The Séguéla Mine in Côte d’Ivoire is an open-pit gold mine that poured its first gold in May 2023. In 2024, Séguéla produced 137,781 ounces of gold.

The Company’s underground Yaramoko gold mine has been producing since 2016 with mining currently taking place at Zone 55. Yaramoko is located in the Hounde greenstone belt region in the Province of Bale in southwestern Burkina Faso. In 2023, Yaramoko produced 117,711 ounces of gold.

The Lindero Mine is an open-pit gold mine located in the province of Salta, Argentina. In 2016, Fortuna acquired the development-stage project, and poured first gold in October 2020. In 2024, the mine produced 97,287 ounces of gold.

The San Jose Mine is an underground silver-gold mine located in the state of Oaxaca in southern Mexico and began commercial production in September 2011. In 2023, the mine produced 4.7 million ounces of silver and 28,559 ounces of gold. In March 2024, Fortuna announced plans to close the mine by the end of the year, but that date was pushed to 2025 after the discovery of additional veins. In early 2025, Fortuna sold Compañia Minera Cuzcatlán, which operated the mine, to the Mexican company Minas del Balsas.

In January 2010, Fortuna signed a 15-year renewable agreement with the Municipality of Ocotlan to refurbish and operate an idle grey water treatment plant in exchange for use of residual grey water at the San Jose Mine. Fortuna modernized the facility, including replacing pumps and motors with more energy efficient equipment. In October 2010, the plant became fully operational, and it is now one of only two wastewater treatment plants in the State of Oaxaca that produce water of sufficient quality for reuse. 80 percent of the treated water is used for the San Jose mine. The remaining 20 percent is reused for public services, including irrigation of the local community’s green areas, and supplying toilet tanks in the local municipal market.

The Caylloma Mine is an underground silver, gold, lead, and zinc mine located approximately 220 kilometers northwest of the Arequipa Department in southern Peru. Its commercial products are silver-lead and zinc concentrates. Fortuna acquired the Caylloma Mine in 2005 and relaunched operations in 2006 after modernizing the processing plant. In 2024, the mine produced 1.2 million ounces of silver, 39.6 million pounds of lead and 51.9 million pounds of zinc.

== Controversy ==
Fortuna was involved in an ongoing dispute with opponents of its San Jose mine. In 2009, there was a two-month long blockade at the company's San Jose mine, with protesters worried about industrial contamination. The blockade lasted from March to May, and was eventually broken up by state police, leading to 19 arrests. In January 2012, opposition increased, due to concerns that the mine was improperly accessing the local water supply. In March 2012, Bernardo Vasquez, the leader of an opposition group to the mine, was shot and killed. One other anti-mine activist was killed in the same year, with three others injured by gunfire. The company denies responsibility for the violence, saying that it was the result of pre-existing social divisions.
