= Badger Daylighting =

Canadian environmental services company

Badger Infrastructure Solutions
- Type: Public
- Traded as: TSX: BDGI; S&P/TSX Composite Component
- Founded: 1992
- Headquarters: Calgary, Alberta, Canada

Badger Infrastructure Solutions is a publicly traded Canadian environmental services company, specializing in soil excavation. and headquartered in Calgary, Alberta. It claims to be North America's largest provider of non-destructive excavation services. It had 2017 revenue of $520 million and a market capitalization of $1.1 billion in 2018.

== History ==
The company was founded in 1992, converted to an income fund in 1996. In 2011, it converted back into an ordinary corporation. It was originally focused on the Canadian market, but eventually expanded to the American market as well. In 2011, Clean Harbours, an American environmental services company, offered to buy Badger for $20.50 a share, in a deal that was accepted by the Badger board and regulators. However, the deal was not approved by shareholders, and so did not go through. In the following two years, the company experienced significant growth, eventually reaching a share price of $40 per share.

In May 2017, the firm's share price fell by 28% to $22, partly as a result of its poor earnings. At the same time, the company attracted the attention of noted short-seller Marc Cohodes, who criticized the company's for various issues, including illegal dumping of toxic waste. As a result of this, the Alberta Securities Commission launched an investigation into Mr. Cohodes's activities.

On May 2, 2018, Badger issued a press release indicating that it had received written confirmation from the Alberta Securities Commission (the “ASC”) that it has concluded its investigation into allegations by short sellers, writing: Staff of the ASC is closing its investigation into allegations by short sellers of accounting and disclosure related breaches of Alberta securities laws by Badger Infrastructure Solutions. ... Pursuant to section 45 of the Securities Act, the Executive Director of the ASC has authorized Badger to divulge that an investigation was conducted and concluded with no enforcement action taken.”.

Following this announcement, some significant improvement in profitability, the indication that the board had turned down an offer to sell the company and the implementation of a stock buyback program, the share price rebounded near 50 $ in the summer of 2019.

== Operations ==
The firm's main business is the use of pressurized water and vacuums to excavate buried pipelines, pipes, cables, and other buried infrastructure. It serves customers in various industries, including the oil and gas, utility, and telecommunication sectors. By the end of 2017, the company's customer base was 34% oil and gas and 66% utility and municipality. Badger is also the manufacturer and operator of hydrovac trucks. The company has 1800 employees and 150 locations, with about 670 employees in Canada and the rest in the United States.
