= CVS Business Rates =

UK business rent and rates services company

Commercial Valuers and Surveyors (CVS)
- Trade name: CVS Business Rates
- Company type: Limited company
- Industry: Real estate
- Founded: 1999
- Defunct: November 2, 2017
- Fate: Acquired
- Successor: Altus Group
- Headquarters: Manchester, United Kingdom
- Area served: United Kingdom
- Key people: Mark Rigby (CEO)
- Services: Surveying
- Number of employees: 275 (2013)
- Website: www.cvsuk.com

Commercial Valuers and Surveyors (CVS or CVS Business Rates) was a British business that provided business rent and rates services to occupiers of commercial property in the United Kingdom. The company was acquired by Canadian Altus Group in 2017 and the business was merged with the Altus Groups business in the UK.

CVS had a team of business rates surveyors who were experienced at successfully lodging business rates appeals at the Valuation Office Agency in the UK. The firm was headquartered in Manchester, and had offices in Old Trafford, Greater Manchester, City of London and Bristol.

== History ==
The company was founded in 1999 and is directed by Mark Rigby, its then CEO.

By 2013, the firm had over 275 staff and a national network of chartered surveyors. CVS’ principal areas of practice include advice and commentary on commercial property valuation, property tax and services.

The company was acquired by Canadian Altus Group in 2017.

== Recognition ==
- ’Highly commended’ for Estates Gazette's National Property Advisor of the Year 2014
- Ranked in the top 20 firms in the Property Week Agency Survey, 2014
- 'Finalist' for Estates Gazette's National Advisor of the Year 2015
- 'Finalist' for Property Week's 'Professional Agency Team of the Year' at the 2016 Property Awards
- 'Finalist' for Estates Gazette's Specialist Adviser of the Year 2017
