= Anne G. Robinson =

Canadian operations researcher and business executive

Anne Gillian Robinson is a Canadian operations researcher and business executive, the chief strategy officer for Canadian supply chain management company Kinaxis, and the former president of the Institute for Operations Research and the Management Sciences (INFORMS), an academic society for operations researchers.

== Early life and education ==
Robinson was born in St. John's, Newfoundland and Labrador. She became an undergraduate at Acadia University, where she majored in mathematics. Her interest in operations research was sparked by a presentation at a mathematics conference at Bentley College in 1993, where she had traveled as part of a group of Acadia University honours mathematics students. She graduated with honours in 1996.

After earning a master's degree in management science from the University of Waterloo, she went to Stanford University to study industrial engineering, earning a second master's degree and then a Ph.D. in 2005. Her doctoral dissertation, Real-time ATP /CTP: Policies for dynamic order promising, was supervised by Robert C. Carlson.

== Career ==
After completing her doctorate, Robinson worked in business analytics and supply chain management at Cisco Systems, before moving in 2011 to Verizon Wireless as executive director of Supply Chain Strategy and Forward Operations.

In 2013, she became president of INFORMS, the youngest to take that office. She moved to Kinaxis as chief strategy officer in 2019.

== Recognition ==
Robinson was awarded the INFORMS George E. Kimball Medal in 2015. She was named a Fellow of INFORMS in the class of 2022.

The Production and Operations Management Society gave Robinson their 2020 Martin K. Starr Excellence in Production and Operations Management Practice Award.
