= InterRent REIT =

InterRent Real Estate Investment Trust
- Company type: Public
- Traded as: TSX: IIP.UN; S&P/TSX Composite Component
- Industry: REITs
- Founded: 2006
- Headquarters: Ottawa, Ontario, Canada
- Key people: Mike McGahan (Chief executive officer); Brad Cutsey (President)
- Website: http://www.interrentreit.com/

InterRent Real Estate Investment Trust is a Canadian real estate investment trust, specializing in residential real estate, and based in Ottawa, Ontario. As of April 2018, it owns 8,800 suites in Ontario and Quebec, worth $1.66 billion. It is listed on the Toronto Stock Exchange under the symbol IIP.UN.

== History ==
InterRent was founded in 2006, and listed on the Toronto Stock Exchange in 2007. The company experienced significant growth between 2009 and 2017, doubling its portfolio. In 2013, it purchased 3 buildings worth $35 million in Montreal. Two years later, in 2015, the company announced it had appointed Brad Cutsey as its president. In 2017, InterRent bought a one-third share in Trinity Station, a proposed development near Ottawa's Bayview Station, for $14.2 million.

Also in 2017, InterRent purchased two buildings in Montreal at 2121 and 2255 Saint Mathieu St. for a total of $53.75 million. At the same time, the company purchased an apartment building at 3 East 37th St. in Hamilton for $11.25 million.

In February 2018, InterRent announced it would internalize its property management functions. Its previous property manager was the CLV Group, whose president, Mike McGahan, is also CEO of InterRent. InterRent paid roughly $38 million to CLV Group in the deal, which also eliminates potential conflict of interest.

In 2015, InterRent purchased Stoney Creek Towers, an east-end Hamilton apartment complex containing 518 units, for $51 million. The company planned to make significant improvements to the poorly managed buildings to improve building functions and safety. In May 2018, the company applied for an Above Guideline Rent Increase, due to the improvements that had taken place. As a result, 80 to 100 tenants in the complex went on a rent strike, organized by the Hamilton Tenant Solidarity Network. The tenants claimed that the improvements made had been minor and cosmetic; the company said that it had spent $17 million on repairs and upgrades. In August 2018, a few dozen tenants traveled to Ottawa to protest at the company's Ottawa headquarters, and at the home of the company's CEO, Mike McGahan. However, they failed to secure a formal meeting with Mr. McGahan or other company representatives.

== Properties ==
InterRent primarily owns apartment complexes in medium-sized centres in Ontario and Quebec. Cities where it has a significant number of properties include Ottawa, Gatineau, Hamilton, Toronto and area, and Montreal. The company's general strategy is to invest in poorly managed properties, make significant upgrades, and improve the quality of the apartments and amenities for new and existing residents.
