= SmartCentres =

Canadian real estate investment trust

SmartCentres Real Estate Investment Trust
- Type: Public
- Traded as: TSX: SRU.UN; S&P/TSX Composite Component
- Industry: Real estate
- Founded: 1994
- Founder: Mitchell Goldhar
- Headquarters: Vaughan, Ontario, Canada
- Key people: Mitchell Goldhar (Executive Chairman & CEO)
- Revenue: $728 million CAD (2016)
- Total equity: $4.74 billion CAD (2019)
- Number of employees: 300 (2016)
- Website: http://www.smartcentres.com

SmartCentres Real Estate Investment Trust is a Canadian real estate investment trust, based in Vaughan, Ontario. It specializes in retail real estate, especially power centres. Almost all of its malls have Walmart as a tenant; SmartCentre's logo features a family of penguins with shopping bags.

SmartCentres cobranded Penguin Pickup with Walmart at a lot of the SmartCentres locations, to merge Bricks & Mortar and e-commerce.

It is listed on the Toronto Stock Exchange (symbol SRU.UN), with a market capitalization of about $4.74 billion as of February 2019.

== History ==
Former logo

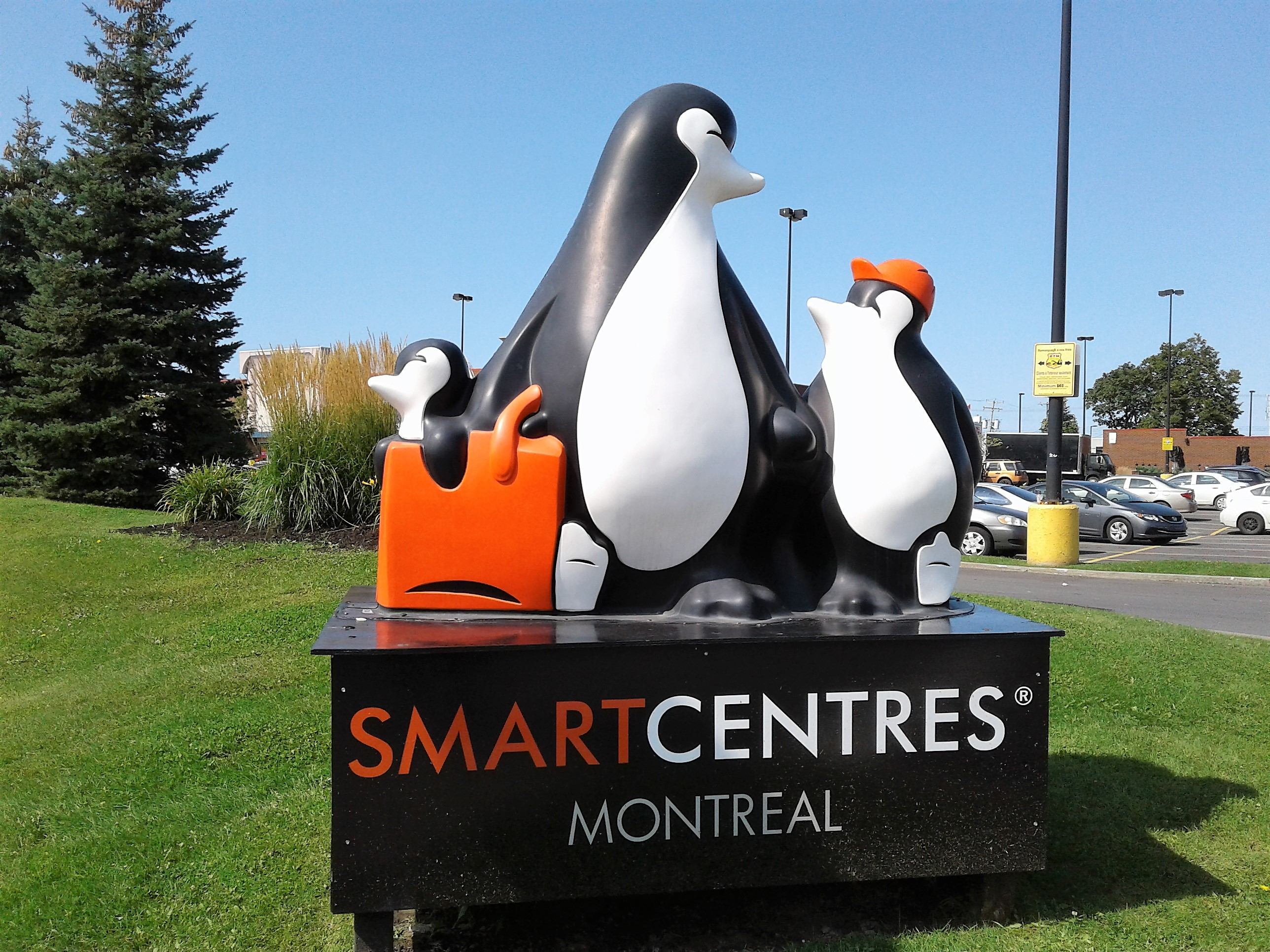
A SmartCentre in Montreal

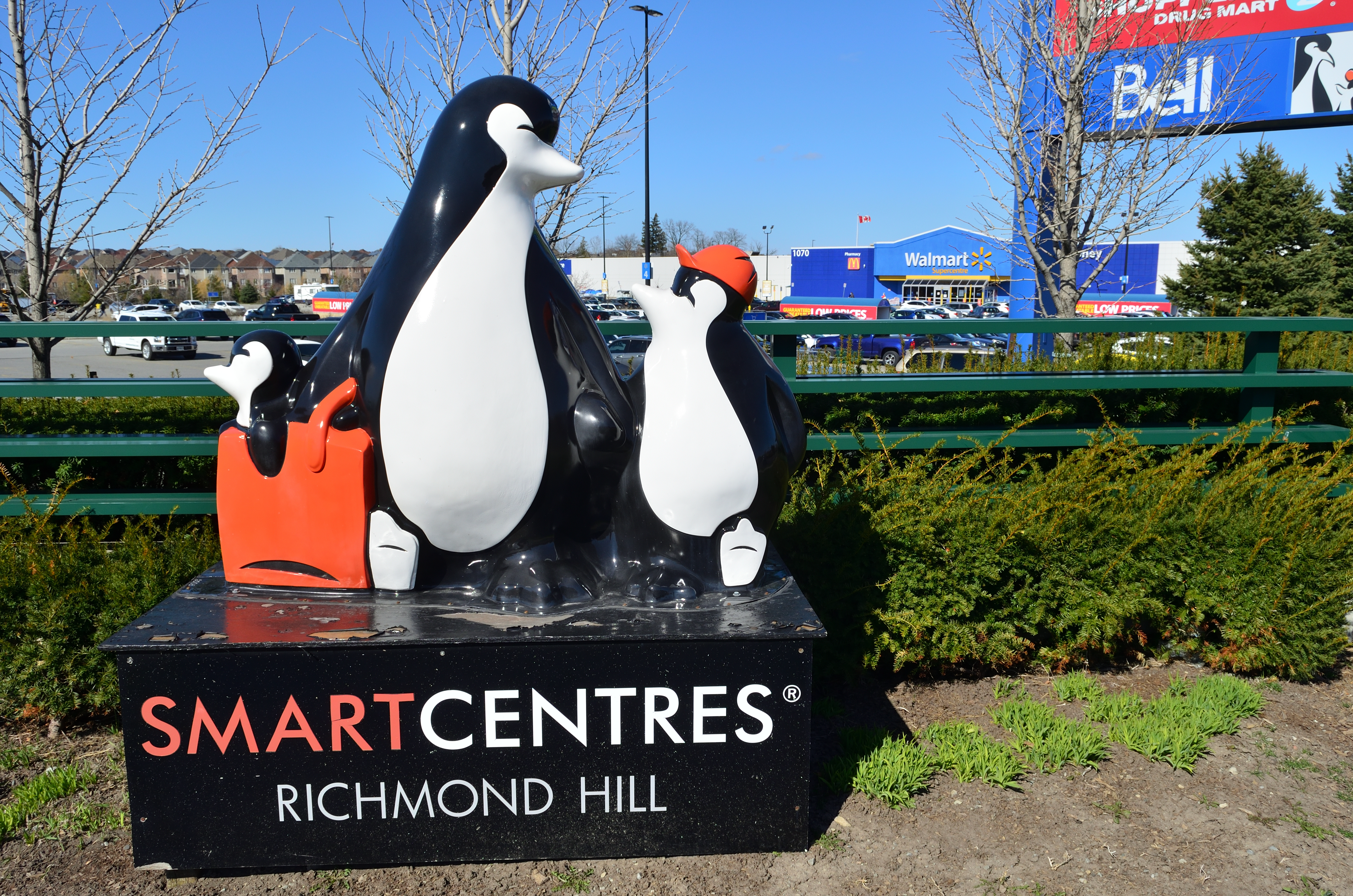
SmartCentre in Richmond Hill, Ontario

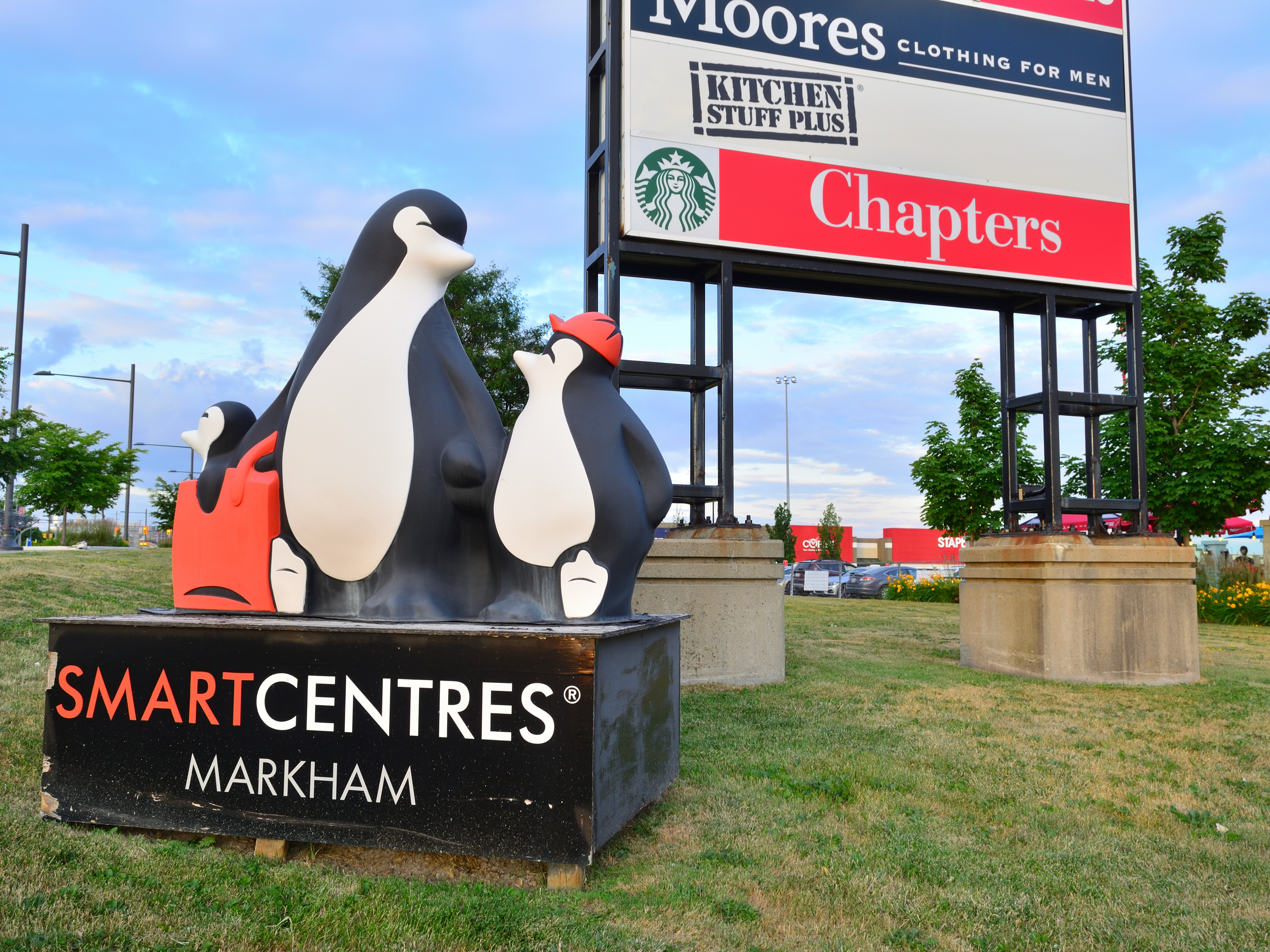
SmartCentre in Markham

SmartCentres was founded in 1994 by Mitchell Goldar, as FirstPro Shopping Centres. It was renamed SmartCentres Inc. in 2006. In 2015, it was taken over by Calloway REIT, which then renamed itself SmartREIT. It changed its name to SmartCentres REIT in 2017.

As of 2011, SmartCentres had opened a new mall once every 3 weeks for its history. As of 2015, it had developed 50 million square feet of space.

=== Relationship with Calloway REIT ===
In 2003, SmartCentres (then FirstPro) began to sell some of its malls to Calloway REIT, then a small REIT based in Calgary, to raise additional funds for construction. Its first transaction was the sale of nine malls for $100 million in November 2003. In 2004, 12 malls were sold for $300 million. In 2005, it sold 35 malls for $1.1 billion. This transaction doubled the size of Calloway, and led to Goldar greatly increasing his control and equity stake in Calloway. In 2006, SmartCentres sold 16 properties, worth $1 billion, to Calloway. In 2008, it sold 6 malls for $375 million.

In 2015, SmartCentres was formally taken over by Calloway REIT for $1.1 billion. As a result of the deal, Calloway acquired 24 properties.

=== Controversies ===
SmartCentres has been involved in a number of controversial developments, often because of its close association with Walmart. In the late 2000s, there was considerable opposition to a SmartCentres plan to build a power centre in eastern Toronto. The plan was eventually turned down by the Ontario Municipal Board. In 2009, its shopping mall in Salmon Arm, British Columbia was delayed because of environmental concerns. The mall was eventually built in 2013.

== Properties ==
SmartCentres properties are generally suburban power centres, with Walmart as a lead tenant. As of 2016, 72% of SmartCentres properties were anchored by Walmart, with Walmart responsible for 26% of rent and 42% of area. However, in recent years, SmartCentres has been diversifying into more urban and mixed-use properties. For instance, SmartCentres is one of the main developers of the Vaughan Metropolitan Centre, a planned central business district for Vaughan, Ontario, a Toronto suburb, where a bus terminal serving a subway station is named after the company, who contributed funding to its construction. SmartCentres is also the main developer of StudioCentre, a mixed-use development in the Leslieville neighbourhood of Toronto. SmartCentres has also considered converting some of its properties into warehouse space.

As of 2017, SmartCentres had 154 shopping centres and $9.4 billion worth in assets. 60% of its revenue was from Ontario, 15% was from Quebec, 9% was from British Columbia, and the other 16% was from the rest of Canada.

=== Penguin Pick-Up ===
A number of online delivery pick-up locations, called Penguin Pick-Ups, are located in SmartCentres properties (the locations are owned by Mitchell Goldhar, the SmartCentres chairman, and use the SmartCentres penguin motif). As of January 2018, there are 76 such locations. The original locations were primarily suburban, but some newer locations have been located in urban areas, including some co-branded with Walmart. The locations principally exist to lower Walmart's delivery costs; Walmart charges for home delivery, but only charges a reduced fee for delivery to a Penguin Pick-Up.
