= Altus Group =

Canadian provider of software for commercial property

Altus Group Limited
- Type: Public
- Traded as: TSX: AIF; S&P/TSX Composite Component
- Industry: Real Estate Services and Software
- Founded: 2005; 21 years ago
- Founder: Gary Yeoman
- Headquarters: Toronto, Ontario, Canada
- Key people: Mike Gordon (CEO)
- Revenue: C$430 million (FY 2025)
- Number of employees: 1,500
- Website: www.altusgroup.com

Altus Group Limited, headquartered in Toronto, Canada, provides software, data, and consulting services for owners and operators of commercial property. Its Altus Analytics segment provides software sold under the Argus brand as well as appraisal and data programs. The CRE Consulting segment provides services for valuation and cost advisory.

The company originally focused on consulting services before expanding into software.

== History ==
In May 2005, Altus Group became a public company via an initial public offering, raising $75 million. This coincided with the merger of three Canadian commercial real estate consultancies, one of which was led by its first CEO, Gary Yeoman.

Altus initially listed on the Toronto Stock Exchange as an income trust and converted into a corporation when the Canadian federal government implemented new taxes on trust distributions in 2011.

In its first five years, the company expanded through acquisitions.

In September 2007, the company expanded its property tax practice into the UK market with the acquisition of Edwin Hill for £26.5 million.

In August 2009, The company expanded its cost consulting practice to the Asia Pacific region through the acquisition of Page Kirkland.

In August 2010, it acquired the real estate appraisal business of PwC.

The company acquired Brazos Tax in 2010.

In 2011, it entered the software market with the acquisition of Argus Software for $130 million.

In November 2011, Gary Yeoman resigned as CEO. In September 2012, Robert Courteau, previously president of SAP North America, became CEO.

In November 2014, it acquired SC&H Group’s State & Local Tax Practice.

In 2014, the company acquired Voyanta, a provider of real estate data management and analytics software, for $7.4 million.

In December 2015, the company acquired Integrated Real Estate Resources, which provides software implementation to the commercial real estate industry.

In 2017, the company acquired CVS Business Rates for £36.3 million.

In January 2018, it acquired New Market Real Estate.

In February 2018, it acquired Aspect Property Consultants. In July 2018, it acquired Taliance, a provider of modelling and forecasting tools for CRE investors. In April 2019, it launched a cloud-supported version of its Argus Enterprise product.

In June 2020, the Geomatics business was merged with that of WSP Global to form Geoverra.

In September 2020, Courteau retired and was succeeded as CEO by Mike Gordon, previously CEO of Callcredit Information Group, a U.K.-based provider of consumer data for businesses.

In May 2021, it acquired Stratodem for $24.4 million.

In June 2021, it suffered a ransomware attack.

In November 2021, it acquired Reonomy for $249.5 million.

In May 2022, the company acquired Rethink Solutions, the developer of the itamlink property tax management software.

In 2024, the company proposed acquiring the commercial real estate valuation services business of Situs, but the acquisition was terminated after failing to get regulatory approval.
