= Mitchell Goldhar =

Canadian billionaire and businessman (born 1962)

Mitchell Goldhar (Hebrew: מיטשל גולדהר) is a Canadian billionaire and businessman.

He owned SmartCentres, a firm that developed Walmart-anchored shopping malls in Canada and retains a significant ownership stake in its successor firm SmartCentres REIT. Since August 2009, he has also been the owner of the Maccabi Tel Aviv Football Club.

Goldhar was born in 1962. He completed his bachelor's degree at York University in Toronto. Goldhar's net worth is estimated at US$2.6 billion as of December 2019.

In 2010, Goldhar bought the sweater Paul Henderson wore while scoring the decisive final goal in the Summit Series; it was being auctioned off by an anonymous American collector for US$1,067,538 (a world record for hockey memorabilia).

On December 30, 2011, Goldhar issued a libel notice against Haaretz, an Israeli newspaper, after they published an article that Goldhar claimed was libel. Haaretz responded by challenging the lawsuit, on the basis of a lack of jurisdiction and forum non conveniens. In 2018 the Supreme Court of Canada ruled that the case could not be heard in Canada, and that if Goldar wished to pursue the case further, it must be done in Israel.

He is Jewish. His father Leo Goldhar is Canadian, and his mother Sala Goldhar (née Armal) was a Holocaust survivor from Poland.

In February 2023, Forbes Israel listed his net worth at US$2.3 billion.

On October 2nd, 2025, he became a father, at age 63.
