= Richelieu Hardware =

Montreal-based manufacturers/distribution

Richelieu Hardware Limited
- Company type: Public
- Traded as: TSX: RCH; S&P/TSX Composite Component
- Industry: Hardware Manufacturing & Distribution
- Founded: 1968; 57 years ago
- Headquarters: Montreal, Quebec, Canada
- Key people: Richard Lord (President and CEO)
- Website: www.richelieu.com

Richelieu Hardware is a Canadian specialty hardware distribution and manufacturing company based in Montreal, Quebec. It has two manufacturing plants and 104 distribution centres in Canada and the United States, and is listed on the Toronto Stock Exchange.

== History ==
Richelieu was founded in 1968. Its current CEO, Richard Lord, joined it in 1988, when it had annual sales of $30 million. The company subsequently undertook a significant expansion program, acquiring 50 companies between 1988 and 2014, and was listed on the Toronto Stock Exchange in 1993. By 2008 it had sales of $441 million. In the 2000s, it began focusing on acquisitions in the United States; between 2009 and 2012, half of its acquisitions were there. Between 2007 and 2017, U.S. sales grew from 20% to 36% of its business.

== Business ==
Richelieu's primary business is the distribution of specialty hardware products. Products distributed by Richelieu include cabinet parts (such as hinges), decorative products (such as doorknobs and mouldings), and kitchen accessories (such as cutlery trays). Its primary customers are cabinet, furniture, door, and window manufacturers. It also sells to retail home-improvement centres, such as Rona. As of 2018, it has 80,000 customers.

The company has 47 distribution centres in Canada and 57 in the United States, as well as manufacturing plants in Longueuil and Notre-Dame-des-Pins. It has 2700 employees.
