= S&P/TSX Composite Index =

Canadian stock market index

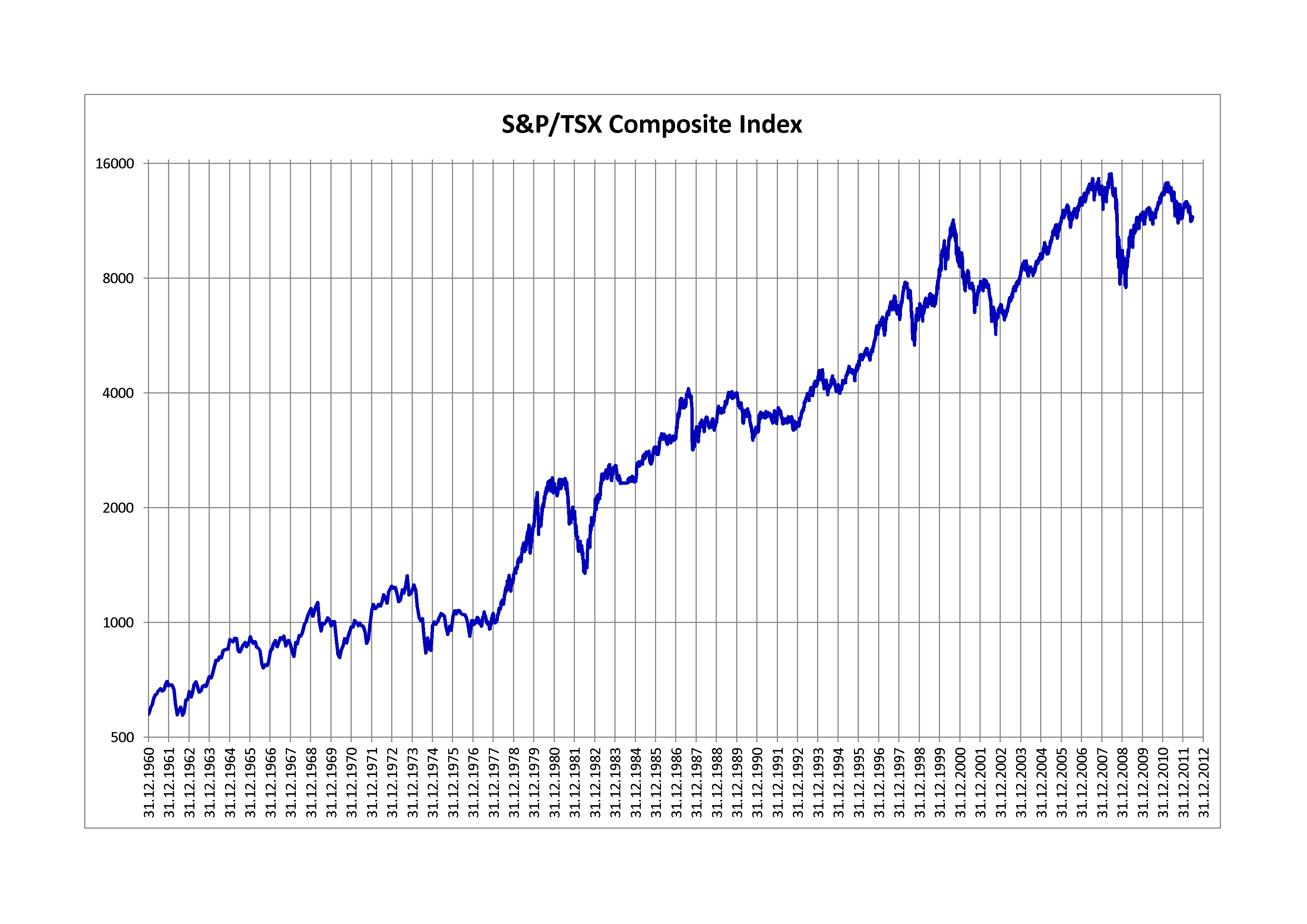
- S&P/TSX Composite Index 1960–2012
- Foundation: May 1, 2001; 25 years ago after replacing the TSX300 which started in 1945
- Operator: S&P Dow Jones Indices
- Exchanges: Toronto Stock Exchange
- Trading symbol: ^GSPTSE
- Constituents: 237
- Type: Large cap
- Weighting method: Price-weighted index
- Website: www.spglobal.com/spdji/en/indices/equity/sp-tsx-composite-index/#overview

The S&P/TSX Composite Index is the benchmark Canadian stock market index representing roughly 70% of the total market capitalization on the Toronto Stock Exchange (TSX). Having replaced the TSE 300 Composite Index on May 1, 2002, as of September 20, 2021, the S&P/TSX Composite Index comprises 237 of the 3,451 companies listed on the TSX. The index surpassed 30,000 points for the first time and reached an intraday high of 30,066 on September 23, 2025.

== Eligibility ==
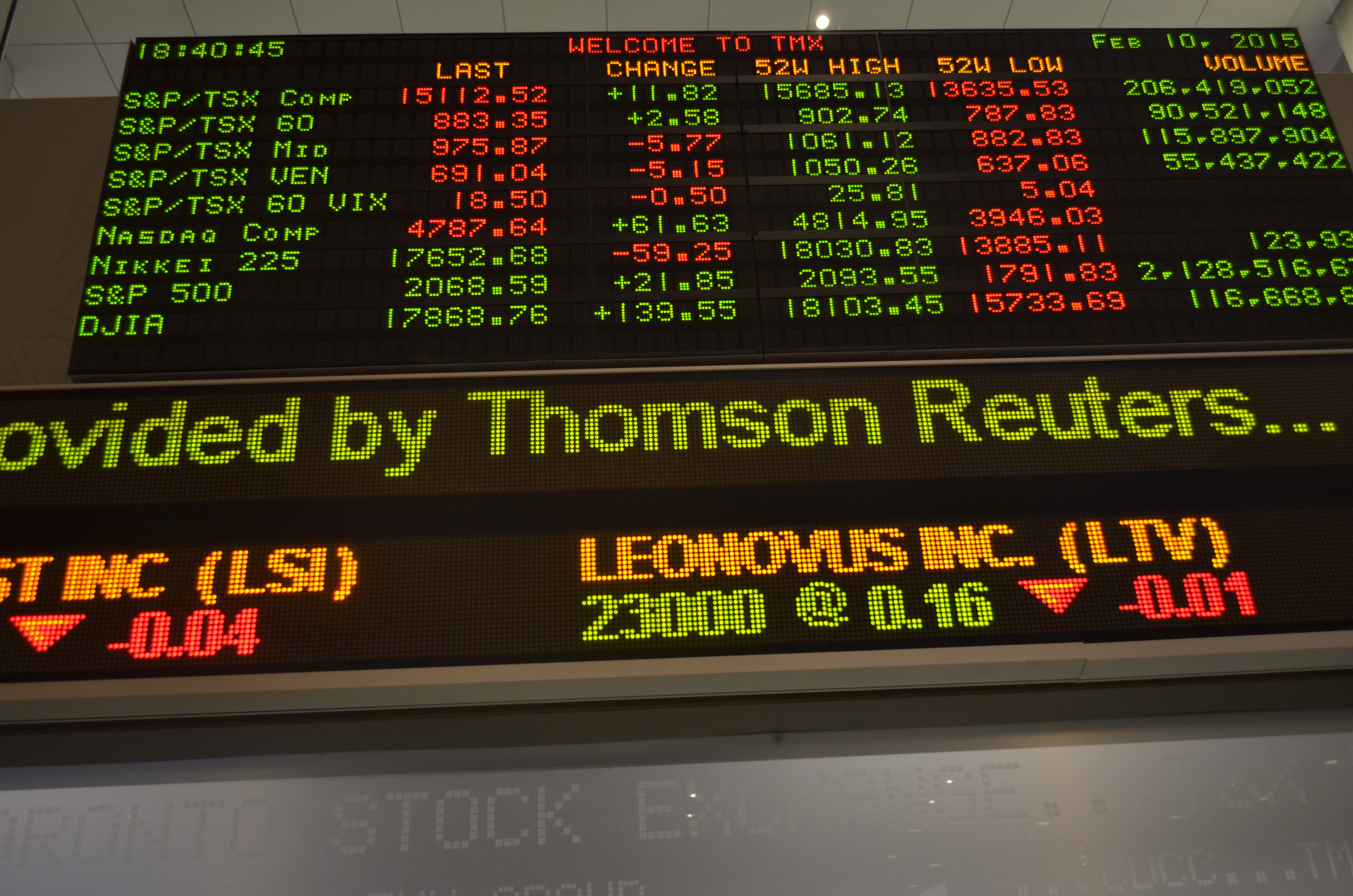
TMX displaying S&P/TSX index information

To be eligible for inclusion in the Composite Index:

- Market capitalization: For eligibility any security must represent a minimum weight of 0.05% of the index. Moreover, the security must have a minimum weighted average price of at least C$1 over the past three months and over the last three trading days of the month-end prior to the exchange reviewing the index.
- Liquidity: The trading volume in terms of dollar value and the number of transactions must exceed at least 0.025% of the sum of all eligible securities' trading volume. To ensure that no single company dominates trading, they are capped at a maximum of 15% for value, volume and transactions.
- Domicile: Stocks must be listed on the Toronto Stock Exchange and be incorporated under Canadian laws.

== Record values ==
Category	All-time highs		Ref.
Closing	35,169.46	June 2, 2026	
Intra-day	35,176.77	June 2, 2026	

== Annual returns ==
The following table shows the annual development of the S&P/TSX Composite Index, which was calculated back to 1945.

Year	Closing level	Change in Index in Points	Change in Index in %
1945	188.96		
1946	189.71	0.75	0.40
1947	180.96	−8.75	−4.61
1948	191.63	10.67	5.90
1949	219.58	27.95	14.59
1950	307.22	87.64	39.91
1951	361.86	54.64	17.79
1952	341.50	−20.36	−5.63
1953	330.83	−10.67	−3.12
1954	437.49	106.66	32.24
1955	536.50	99.01	22.63
1956	564.97	28.47	5.31
1957	432.11	−132.86	−23.52
1958	547.72	115.61	26.75
1959	555.09	7.37	1.35
1960	544.74	−10.35	−1.86
1961	700.85	156.11	28.66
1962	628.99	−71.86	−10.25
1963	702.71	73.72	11.72
1964	853.53	150.82	21.46
1965	881.14	27.61	3.23
1966	789.51	−91.63	−10.40
1967	899.20	109.69	13.89
1968	1,062.88	163.68	18.20
1969	1,019.77	−43.11	−4.06
1970	947.54	−72.23	−7.08
1971	990.54	43.00	4.54
1972	1,226.58	236.04	23.83
1973	1,193.56	−33.02	−2.69
1974	844.48	−349.08	−29.25
1975	953.54	109.06	12.91
1976	1,011.52	57.98	6.08
1977	1,059.59	48.07	4.75
1978	1,309.99	250.40	23.63
1979	1,813.17	503.18	38.41
1980	2,268.70	455.53	25.12
1981	1,954.24	−314.46	−13.86
1982	1,958.08	3.84	0.20
1983	2,552.35	594.27	30.35
1984	2,400.33	−152.02	−5.96
1985	2,900.60	500.27	20.84
1986	3,066.18	165.58	5.71
1987	3,160.05	93.87	3.06
1988	3,389.99	229.94	7.28
1989	3,969.79	579.80	17.10
1990	3,256.75	−713.04	−17.96
1991	3,512.36	255.61	7.85
1992	3,350.44	−161.92	−4.61
1993	4,321.43	970.99	28.98
1994	4,213.61	−107.82	−2.50
1995	4,713.54	499.93	11.86
1996	5,927.03	1,213.49	25.74
1997	6,699.44	772.41	13.03
1998	6,485.94	−213.50	−3.19
1999	8,413.75	1,927.81	29.72
2000	8,933.68	519.93	6.18
2001	7,688.41	−1,245.27	−13.94
2002	6,614.54	−1,073.87	−13.97
2003	8,220.89	1,606.35	24.29
2004	9,246.65	1,025.76	12.48
2005	11,272.26	2,025.61	21.91
2006	12,908.39	1,636.13	14.51
2007	13,833.06	924.67	7.16
2008	8,987.70	−4,845.36	−35.03
2009	11,746.11	2,758.41	30.69
2010	13,382.97	1,636.86	13.94
2011	11,955.09	−1,427.88	−10.67
2012	12,433.53	478.44	4.00
2013	13,621.55	1,188.02	9.55
2014	14,632.44	1,010.89	7.42
2015	13,009.95	−1,622.49	−11.09
2016	15,287.59	2,277.64	17.51
2017	16,209.13	921.54	6.03
2018	14,322.86	−1,886.27	−11.64
2019	17,063.43	2,740.57	19.13
2020	17,433.36	369.93	2.17
2021	21,222.84	3,789.48	21.74
2022	19,384.92	−1,837.92	−8.66
2023	20,958.40	1,573.48	8.12
2024	24,727.90	3,769.50	17.99
2025	31,712.80	6,984.90	28.25

== List of companies ==
On April 20, 2026 the S&P/TSX Composite Index comprised the following 220 companies

Ticker	Company	Sector	Industry
VNP	5N Plus Inc.	Materials	Chemicals
ABRA	AbraSilver Resource Corp.	Materials	Metals & Mining
AAV	Advantage Energy Ltd.	Energy	Oil & Gas Exploration and Production
ARE	Aecon Group Inc.	Industrials	Construction & Engineering
AEM	Agnico Eagle Mines Limited	Materials	Metals & Mining
AC	Air Canada	Industrials	Transportation
AGI	Alamos Gold Inc.	Materials	Metals & Mining
AQN	Algonquin Power & Utilities Corp.	Utilities	Regulated Utilities
ATD	Alimentation Couche-Tard Inc.	Consumer Discretionary	Specialty Retail
AAUC	Allied Gold Corporation	Materials	Metals & Mining
AP.UN	Allied Properties Real Estate Investment Trust	Real Estate	REITs
ALA	AltaGas Ltd.	Energy	Oil & Gas Storage/Transport
AIF	Altus Group Limited	Real Estate	Real Estate
USA	Americas Gold And Silver Corporation	Materials	Metals & Mining
ARX	ARC Resources Ltd.	Energy	Oil & Gas Exploration and Production
ARIS	Aris Mining Corporation	Materials	Metals & Mining
ATZ	Aritzia Inc.	Consumer Discretionary	Specialty Retail
ACO.X	ATCO Ltd.	Utilities	Regulated Utilities
ATH	Athabasca Oil Corporation	Energy	Oil & Gas Exploration and Production
ATRL	AtkinsRéalis Group Inc.	Industrials	Construction & Engineering
ATS	ATS Corporation	Industrials	Industrial Products
ASM	Avino Silver & Gold Mines Ltd.	Materials	Metals & Mining
AYA	Aya Gold & Silver Inc.	Materials	Metals & Mining
BTO	B2Gold Corp.	Materials	Metals & Mining
BDGI	Badger Infrastructure Solutions Ltd.	Industrials	Construction & Engineering
BMO	Bank of Montreal	Financials	Banks
BNS	Bank of Nova Scotia	Financials	Banks
ABX	Barrick Gold Corporation	Materials	Metals & Mining
BHC	Bausch Health Companies Inc.	Healthcare	Pharmaceuticals
BTE	Baytex Energy Corp.	Energy	Oil & Gas Exploration and Production
BCE	BCE Inc.	Communication Services	Telecommunication Services
BIR	Birchcliff Energy Ltd.	Energy	Oil & Gas Exploration and Production
BDT	Bird Construction Inc.	Industrials	Construction & Engineering
BB	BlackBerry Limited	Information Technology	Software
BEI.UN	Boardwalk Real Estate Investment Trust	Real Estate	REITs
BBD.B	Bombardier Inc.	Industrials	Aerospace & Defense
BLX	Boralex Inc.	Energy	Renewable Energy Producers
BYD	Boyd Group Services Inc.	Consumer Discretionary	Personal Services
BAM	Brookfield Asset Management Ltd.	Financials	Asset Management
BBUC	Brookfield Business Corporation	Industrials	Conglomerates
BN	Brookfield Corporation	Financials	Asset Management
BIP.UN	Brookfield Infrastructure Partners L.P.	Utilities	Regulated Utilities
BEP.UN	Brookfield Renewable Partners L.P.	Energy	Renewable Energy Producers
DOO	BRP Inc.	Consumer Discretionary	Vehicles & Parts
CAE	CAE Inc.	Industrials	Aerospace & Defense
CCO	Cameco Corporation	Energy	Other Energy Sources
CAR.UN	Canadian Apartment Properties Real Estate Investment Trust	Real Estate	REITs
CM	Canadian Imperial Bank of Commerce	Financials	Banks
CNR	Canadian National Railway Company	Industrials	Transportation
CNQ	Canadian Natural Resources Limited	Energy	Oil & Gas Exploration and Production
CP	Canadian Pacific Kansas City Limited	Industrials	Transportation
CTC.A	Canadian Tire Corporation Limited	Consumer Discretionary	Specialty Retail
CU	Canadian Utilities Limited	Utilities	Regulated Utilities
CPX	Capital Power Corporation	Utilities	Independent Power Producers
CS	Capstone Copper Corp.	Materials	Metals & Mining
CJT	Cargojet Inc.	Industrials	Transportation
CCL.B	CCL Industries Inc.	Consumer Discretionary	Containers & Packaging
CLS	Celestica Inc.	Information Technology	Hardware & Equipment
CVE	Cenovus Energy Inc.	Energy	Integrated Oil & Gas
CG	Centerra Gold Inc.	Materials	Metals & Mining
CEU	CES Energy Solutions Corp.	Energy	Oil & Gas Equipment & Services
GIB.A	CGI Inc.	Information Technology	Software
CSH.UN	Chartwell Retirement Residences	Real Estate	Real Estate
CHP.UN	Choice Properties Real Estate Investment Trust	Real Estate	REITs
CCA	Cogeco Communications Inc.	Communication Services	Telecommunication Services
CIGI	Colliers International Group Inc.	Real Estate	Real Estate
CSU	Constellation Software Inc.	Information Technology	Software
CRR.UN	Crombie Real Estate Investment Trust	Real Estate	REITs
CRT.UN	CT Real Estate Investment Trust	Real Estate	REITs
CURA	Curaleaf Holdings, Inc.	Healthcare	Pharmaceuticals
DFY	Definity Financial Corporation	Financials	Insurance
DML	Denison Mines Corp.	Energy	Other Energy Sources
DSG	Descartes Systems Group Inc.	Information Technology	Software
DSV	Discovery Silver Corp.	Materials	Metals & Mining
DOL	Dollarama Inc.	Consumer Staples	Retailers - Staples
DIR.UN	Dream Industrial Real Estate Investment Trust	Real Estate	REITs
DPM	Dundee Precious Metals Inc.	Materials	Metals & Mining
ELD	Eldorado Gold Corporation	Materials	Metals & Mining
EFN	Element Fleet Management Corp.	Industrials	Business Services
EMA	Emera Incorporated	Utilities	Regulated Utilities
EMP.A	Empire Company Limited	Consumer Staples	Retailers - Staples
ENB	Enbridge Inc.	Energy	Oil & Gas Storage/Transport
EDR	Endeavour Silver Corp.	Materials	Metals & Mining
EFR	Energy Fuels Inc.	Energy	Other Energy Sources
EQB	EQB Inc.	Financials	Banks
EFX	Equifax Inc.	Industrials	Consulting Services
EQX	Equinox Gold Corp.	Materials	Metals & Mining
ERO	Ero Copper Corp.	Materials	Metals & Mining
EIF	Exchange Income Corporation	Industrials	Transportation
FFH	Fairfax Financial Holdings Limited	Financials	Insurance
FTT	Finning International Inc.	Industrials	Industrial Distribution
FCR.UN	First Capital Real Estate Investment Trust	Real Estate	REITs
AG	First Majestic Silver Corp.	Materials	Metals & Mining
FM	First Quantum Minerals Ltd.	Materials	Metals & Mining
FSV	FirstService Corporation	Real Estate	Real Estate
FTS	Fortis Inc.	Utilities	Regulated Utilities
FVI	Fortuna Mining Corp.	Materials	Metals & Mining
FNV	Franco-Nevada Corporation	Materials	Metals & Mining
FRU	Freehold Royalties Ltd.	Energy	Oil & Gas Exploration and Production
GMIN	G Mining Ventures Corp.	Materials	Metals & Mining
WN	George Weston Limited	Consumer Staples	Retailers - Staples
GFL	GFL Environmental Inc.	Industrials	Waste Management
GEI	Gibson Energy Inc.	Energy	Oil & Gas Storage/Transport
GIL	Gildan Activewear Inc.	Consumer Discretionary	Apparel & Accessories
GSY	goeasy Ltd.	Financials	Consumer Finance
GRT.UN	Granite Real Estate Investment Trust	Real Estate	REITs
GWO	Great-West Lifeco Inc.	Financials	Insurance
HR.UN	H&R Real Estate Investment Trust	Real Estate	REITs
HWX	Headwater Exploration Inc.	Energy	Oil & Gas Exploration and Production
HBM	Hudbay Minerals Inc.	Materials	Metals & Mining
H	Hydro One Limited	Utilities	Regulated Utilities
IAU	I-80 Gold Corp.	Materials	Metals & Mining
IAG	iA Financial Corporation Inc.	Financials	Insurance
IMG	Iamgold Corporation	Materials	Metals & Mining
IGM	IGM Financial Inc.	Financials	Asset Management
IMO	Imperial Oil Limited	Energy	Integrated Oil & Gas
IFC	Intact Financial Corporation	Financials	Insurance
IPCO	International Petroleum Corporation	Energy	Oil & Gas Exploration and Production
IIP.UN	InterRent Real Estate Investment Trust	Real Estate	REITs
IVN	Ivanhoe Mines Ltd.	Materials	Metals & Mining
JWEL	Jamieson Wellness Inc.	Consumer Staples	Consumer Packaged Goods
KNT	K92 Mining Inc.	Materials	Metals & Mining
KEL	Kelt Exploration Ltd.	Energy	Oil & Gas Exploration and Production
KEY	Keyera Corp.	Energy	Oil & Gas Storage/Transport
KMP.UN	Killam Apartment Real Estate Investment Trust	Real Estate	REITs
KXS	Kinaxis Inc.	Information Technology	Software
K	Kinross Gold Corporation	Materials	Metals & Mining
LIF	Labrador Iron Ore Royalty Corporation	Materials	Steel
LB	Laurentian Bank of Canada	Financials	Banks
LSPD	Lightspeed Commerce Inc.	Information Technology	Software
LNR	Linamar Corporation	Consumer Discretionary	Vehicles & Parts
LAC	Lithium Americas Corp.	Materials	Metals & Mining
L	Loblaw Companies Limited	Consumer Staples	Retailers - Staples
LUG	Lundin Gold Inc.	Materials	Metals & Mining
LUN	Lundin Mining Corporation	Materials	Metals & Mining
MG	Magna International Inc.	Consumer Discretionary	Vehicles & Parts
MFC	Manulife Financial Corporation	Financials	Insurance
MFI	Maple Leaf Foods Inc.	Consumer Staples	Consumer Packaged Goods
MDA	MDA Space Ltd.	Industrials	Aerospace & Defense
MX	Methanex Corporation	Materials	Chemicals
MRU	Metro Inc.	Consumer Staples	Retailers - Staples
MAU	Montage Gold Corp.	Materials	Metals & Mining
MTL	Mullen Group Ltd.	Industrials	Transportation
NA	National Bank of Canada	Financials	Banks
NXE	NexGen Energy Ltd.	Energy	Other Energy Sources
NFI	NFI Group Inc.	Consumer Discretionary	Vehicles & Parts
NGEX	NGEx Minerals Ltd.	Materials	Metals & Mining
NWC	North West Company Inc.	Consumer Staples	Retailers - Staples
NPI	Northland Power Inc.	Energy	Renewable Energy Producers
NG	NovaGold Resources Inc.	Materials	Metals & Mining
NTR	Nutrien Ltd.	Materials	Agriculture
OGC	OceanaGold Corporation	Materials	Metals & Mining
ONEX	Onex Corporation	Financials	Asset Management
OTEX	Open Text Corporation	Information Technology	Software
OLA	Orla Mining Ltd.	Materials	Metals & Mining
OR	Osisko Gold Royalties Ltd.	Materials	Metals & Mining
PAAS	Pan American Silver Corp.	Materials	Metals & Mining
POU	Paramount Resources Ltd.	Energy	Oil & Gas Exploration and Production
PXT	Parex Resources Inc.	Energy	Oil & Gas Exploration and Production
PPL	Pembina Pipeline Corporation	Energy	Oil & Gas Storage/Transport
PPTA	Perpetua Resources Corp.	Materials	Metals & Mining
PET	Pet Valu Holdings Ltd.	Consumer Discretionary	Specialty Retail
PEY	Peyto Exploration & Development Corp.	Energy	Oil & Gas Exploration and Production
POW	Power Corporation of Canada	Financials	Insurance
PSK	PrairieSky Royalty Ltd.	Energy	Oil & Gas Exploration and Production
PBH	Premium Brands Holdings Corporation	Consumer Staples	Consumer Packaged Goods
PMZ.UN	Primaris Real Estate Investment Trust	Real Estate	REITs
QBR.B	Quebecor Inc.	Communication Services	Telecommunication Services
RBA	RB Global, Inc.	Industrials	Specialty Business Services
QSR	Restaurant Brands International Inc.	Consumer Discretionary	Restaurants
RCH	Richelieu Hardware Ltd.	Consumer Discretionary	Home and Homeware
REI.UN	RioCan Real Estate Investment Trust	Real Estate	REITs
RCI.B	Rogers Communications Inc.	Communication Services	Telecommunication Services
RY	Royal Bank of Canada	Financials	Banks
RUS	Russel Metals Inc.	Industrials	Industrial Distribution
SAP	Saputo Inc.	Consumer Staples	Consumer Packaged Goods
SEA	Seabridge Gold Inc.	Materials	Metals & Mining
SES	Secure Energy Services Inc.	Industrials	Waste Management
SHOP	Shopify Inc.	Information Technology	Software
SIA	Sienna Senior Living Inc.	Healthcare	Healthcare Providers & Services
SVM	Silvercorp Metals Inc.	Materials	Metals & Mining
SKE	Skeena Resources Limited	Materials	Metals & Mining
SRU.UN	SmartCentres Real Estate Investment Trust	Real Estate	REITs
SOBO	South Bow Corporation	Energy	Oil & Gas Storage/Transport
SII	Sprott Inc.	Financials	Asset Management
SSRM	SSR Mining Inc.	Materials	Metals & Mining
STN	Stantec Inc.	Industrials	Construction & Engineering
SJ	Stella-Jones Inc.	Materials	Forest Products
SCR	Strathcona Resources Ltd.	Energy	Oil & Gas Exploration and Production
SLF	Sun Life Financial Inc.	Financials	Insurance
SU	Suncor Energy Inc.	Energy	Integrated Oil & Gas
SPB	Superior Plus Corp.	Utilities	Regulated Utilities
TVE	Tamarack Valley Energy Ltd.	Energy	Oil & Gas Exploration and Production
TKO	Taseko Mines Limited	Materials	Metals & Mining
TRP	TC Energy Corporation	Energy	Oil & Gas Storage/Transport
TECK.B	Teck Resources Limited	Materials	Metals & Mining
T	Telus Corporation	Communication Services	Telecommunication Services
TVK	TerraVest Industries Inc.	Energy	Oil & Gas Equipment & Services
TFII	TFI International Inc.	Industrials	Transportation
TRI	Thomson Reuters Corporation	Industrials	Business Services
X	TMX Group Limited	Financials	Capital Markets
TPZ	Topaz Energy Corp.	Energy	Oil & Gas Storage/Transport
TXG	Torex Gold Resources Inc.	Materials	Metals & Mining
TIH	Toromont Industries Ltd.	Industrials	Industrial Distribution
TD	Toronto-Dominion Bank	Financials	Banks
TOU	Tourmaline Oil Corp.	Energy	Oil & Gas Exploration and Production
TA	TransAlta Corporation	Utilities	Independent Power Producers
TCL.A	Transcontinental Inc.	Consumer Discretionary	Containers & Packaging
TFPM	Triple Flag Precious Metals Corp.	Materials	Metals & Mining
TSU	Trisura Group Ltd.	Financials	Insurance
VET	Vermilion Energy Inc.	Energy	Oil & Gas Exploration and Production
VITL.UN	Vital Infrastructure Property Trust.	Real Estate	REITs
VZLA	Vizsla Silver Corp.	Materials	Metals & Mining
WCN	Waste Connections Inc.	Industrials	Waste Management
WDO	Wesdome Gold Mines Ltd.	Materials	Metals & Mining
WFG	West Fraser Timber Co. Ltd.	Materials	Forestry
WPM	Wheaton Precious Metals Corp.	Materials	Metals & Mining
WCP	Whitecap Resources Inc.	Energy	Oil & Gas Exploration and Production
WPK	Winpak Ltd.	Consumer Discretionary	Containers & Packaging
WSP	WSP Global Inc.	Industrials	Construction & Engineering

== Exchange-traded funds ==
There are currently no ETFs that match the S&P/TSX Composite Index; however, the iShares S&P/TSX Completion Index Fund (TSX: XMD) combined with the iShares S&P/TSX 60 Index Fund (TSX: XIU) can give equivalent exposure. The iShares S&P/TSX Capped Composite Index Fund (TSX: XIC) and BMO S&P/TSX Capped Composite Index Fund (TSX: ZCN) match the diversity of the index but the relative weighting of each constituent is capped at 10%.

BlackRock also provides several iShares-brand ETFs which provide exposure to segments of the index; these include:

- S&P/TSX Capped Energy Index Fund (TSX: XEG)
- S&P/TSX Capped Financial Services Index Fund (TSX: XFN)
- S&P/TSX Capped Technology Index Fund (TSX: XIT)
- S&P/TSX Capped Basic Materials Index Fund (TSX: XMA)
- S&P/TSX Capped REIT Index Fund (TSX: XRE)

== See also ==
- List of companies listed on the Toronto Stock Exchange
- S&P/TSX 60
