= Stella-Jones =

Canadian wood products company

Stella-Jones Inc.
- Formerly: 2865165 Canada Inc.
- Company type: Public
- Traded as: TSX: SJ
- Founded: October 26, 1992; 33 years ago
- Headquarters: Montreal, Quebec, Canada
- Website: stella-jones.com

Stella-Jones Inc. (TSX: SJ) is a Canadian manufacturer of pressure-treated wood products, based in Montreal, Quebec.

As of 2013, the company is estimated to hold a 40% share of the North American wood railway tie market and 30% of the wood poles market.

== History ==
The company was incorporated as 2865165 Canada Inc. on October 26, 1992, and changed its name to Stella-Jones Inc. on February 19, 1993.

Brian McManus was chief executive officer of Stella-Jones for 18 years from 2001 to 2019. He was succeeded by Eric Vachon.

In August 2025, Stella-Jones pleaded guilty to 10 criminal charges of unlawful water pollution in Yamhill County, Oregon. The pollution involved the dumping of pentachlorophenol between December 2022 and March 2023. The company was fined $250,000, which was reduced by $50,000 pending any related pollution over the next three years. Additionally, in September 2025 the Oregon Department of Environmental Quality announced a $1 million civil penalty against Stella-Jones.

== See also ==
- Forestry in Canada
- S&P/TSX Composite Index
