= Mark Rigby =

English rugby union player & administrator (born 1960)

Mark Rigby (born 1960) is the current president of Wasps RFC and chief executive of business rent & rates firm CVS Business Rates.

== Biography ==
Rigby was born in 1960 and educated at Felsted School between 1974 and 1979. He graduated from Southampton University in 1983 with a B.A.(Hons) in Modern History & Politics.

=== Rugby career ===
In 1980 Rigby joined Wasps RFC as a back row forward. He made more than 150 appearances during an 11-year period in the first XV and was captain from 1991 to 1992. He was a member of Wasps' first Premiership title win in 1991. Rigby also played for Middlesex, London, England Classicals and British Lions Classicals.

Rigby became Executive Chairman of Wasps RFC in 2009 before becoming Chairman a year later. In 2015, he was named President.

=== After rugby ===
Rigby, a Chartered Surveyor, joined Lambert Smith Hampton in 1989, and was Chief Executive from 2003 to 2008. Rigby was made Chief Executive of CVS in 2010.

Rigby is a Chartered Director and Fellow of the Institute of Directors. He is a member of Speakers for Schools, a charity established by Robert Peston to deliver motivational talks to schools.
