= Kinaxis =

Software company in Canada

Kinaxis Inc.
- Type: Public
- Traded as: TSX: KXS; S&P/TSX Composite Component
- Industry: IT services
- Founded: 1984; 42 years ago
- Founders: Dr. D. Michael Caughey, John R. Peacock, and Duncan Klett
- Headquarters: 3199 Palladium Drive; Ottawa, Ontario; K2T 0N9
- Area served: Worldwide
- Key people: Razat Gaurav (CEO); Herb Yeh (Chief Financial Officer); Mark Morgan (President Commercial Operations); Megan Paterson (Chief Operating Officer); Andrew Bell (Chief Product Officer); Kristin Russel (Chief Marketing Officer); Michael Mauger (Chief Customer Success Officer); Jamie Hollingworth (Chief Legal Officer and Corporate Secretary)
- Services: Supply Chain Management Supply Chain Orchestration
- Revenue: ▲US$548.030 million (2025)
- Net income: ▲US$138.370 million (2025)
- Number of employees: 1,837 (2025)
- Website: www.kinaxis.com

Kinaxis Inc. is an enterprise software company that provides cloud-based supply chain orchestration software to global manufacturers and distributors. Its platform supports concurrent planning, scenario analysis, and decision making across supply chain functions including demand, supply, inventory, and sales and operations planning.

The company is based in the Kanata district of Ottawa, Ontario, Canada. It is listed on the Toronto Stock Exchange and is a S&P/TSX Composite Component.

The company was founded in 1984 by Dr. D. Michael Caughey, John R. Peacock, and Duncan Klett, as Cadence Computer Corporation and went public in June 2014. On January 8, 2026, Kinaxis announced Razat Gaurav as its new CEO.

== Business ==
Kinaxis provides supply-chain-management software on a subscription basis, primarily to large, multinational companies. Customers include Ford, Cisco, Qualcomm, and Avaya. As of 2025, Kinaxis has over 400 customers, including some of the largest companies in the world. Kinaxis also provides related professional services. Contracts typically run for two to five years.

Kinaxis’ primary product is Kinaxis Maestro, a cloud-based platform designed for concurrent supply chain planning and orchestration. Kinaxis maintains a partner ecosystem that includes global systems integrators and consulting firms, including Deloitte and Accenture, which implement and extend the Kinaxis platform for enterprise customers. Competitors in the supply chain management software industry include SAP SE and Blue Yonder.

== Technology ==
Kinaxis’ software platform is built on a concurrent architecture that enables multiple supply chain processes to operate simultaneously on a shared data model, rather than through sequential handoffs. This design allows changes in areas such as demand, supply, inventory, or production to propagate across the system in near real time, supporting faster and more coordinated decision making in complex, multi-tier supply chains.

The platform supports large-scale scenario modeling, allowing organizations to simulate and compare alternative responses to demand shifts, supply constraints, and policy or operational decisions before execution. These capabilities are used to evaluate trade-offs across functions and time horizons within a single, integrated environment.

Beginning in 2025, Kinaxis expanded the platform with artificial intelligence–based agents, referred to as Maestro Agents, to support continuous monitoring, exception detection, and scenario-driven decision support. These agents are designed to operate within defined business rules and governance controls, augmenting human decision-makers by identifying issues, generating recommendations, and assisting with the evaluation of alternative courses of action as conditions change.

== History ==
Kinaxis was founded in 1984 as Cadence Computer Corporation by three former Mitel engineers, Dr. D. Michael Caughey, John R. Peacock and Duncan Klett, to conduct supply chain analysis using custom mainframe computers. The name was later changed to Carp Systems International (after the nearby Carp River), then Enterprise Planning Systems. In the mid 1990s, it changed its name to Webplan and shifted from making hardware to providing software.

=== Recent history ===
In 2000, it led a venture round that raised $33 million. In 2005, it renamed itself Kinaxis, and started focusing on selling software by subscription, as opposed to collecting a one-time fee. In June 2014, it held an IPO on the Toronto Stock Exchange, raising a total of $100 million. Since then, its market capitalization has increased to $1.7 billion, as of August 2017. In 2022 they acquired MPO, a multi party orchestration platform connecting Supply Chain actors.

In December 2024, Kinaxis Inc. has rejected calls from activist investors to pursue a sale, emphasizing its commitment to creating long-term shareholder value. Daventry Group LP, holding a 1.3% stake in the company, issued a letter urging the board to explore a sale, while Irenic Capital Management LP echoed this sentiment in a separate statement. In response, Kinaxis hired Goldman Sachs for strategic advice and reaffirmed its focus on its current business plan. On January 8, 2026, Kinaxis announced Razat Gaurav as its new CEO.

In June 2026, ScottsMiracle-Gro expanded its partnership with Kinaxis, moving all supply chain planning onto the Kinaxis Maestro platform. The expansion followed a three-year supply chain overhaul in which ScottsMiracle-Gro reduced its inventory from $1.3 billion to $627 million and cut its distribution centre network from 18 to five facilities, achieving $75 million in cost savings in fiscal 2025.
