= Information services =

Information Service(s), or information service(s) may refer to:

- Information broker services, provided by a company which collects data for use by a third party
- Information service, a term defined by the US Communications Act of 1934
- Information services, a group of services offered by a library or other institution
- Information services, a group of services offered by information professionals of various types
- Information Services, a unit or department in an enterprise responsible for delivering information systems
- Information Services Corporation, a company providing registry and information services to the Government of Saskatchewan, Canada
- Information Services Department (ISD), public relations office of the Hong Kong Government
- Information Services Division (ISD), part of NHS Scotland that provides health information
- Information technology services of various types

== See also ==
- Information science
- Information system
- Business Information Services Library, a public domain standard used for information management
- Indian Information Service (IIS), Indian Government media, information and news civil service
- Information Services & Use, a scientific journal covering information management and applications
- Information Systems & Services, former department of the UK Ministry of Defence
- Information Services Procurement Library (ISPL), a best practice framework for the procurement of information services
- Internet Information Services (IIS), web server software created by Microsoft
- Network Information Service (NIS), formerly UK Yellow Pages
- Participatory information service, an information service with two-way flow with its users
