= Companies listed on the Toronto Stock Exchange (A) =

Toronto Stock Exchange listed stocks:

0–9 - A - B - C - D - E - F - G - H - I - J - K - L - M - N - O - P - Q - R - S - T - U - V - W - X - Y - Z

This is not a complete listing of everything listed and traded on the TSX.

- Only one share class per issuer is listed (so the banks with many preferred shares are only listed once). The symbol listed is the company's primary symbol.
- No ETFs
- No structured financial/investment companies (e.g. Aberdeen Asia-Pacific Income Investment Company Limited)

== A ==
Stock Name	Symbol
A&W Revenue Royalties Income Fund	AW.UN
Aberdeen International Inc.	AAB
Acadian Timber Corp.	ADN
Accord Financial Corp.	ACD
Aclara Resources Inc.	ARA
ACT Energy Technologies Ltd.	ACX
Adcore Inc.	ADCO
ADENTRA Inc.	ADEN
ADF Group Inc.	DRX
Advantage Energy Ltd.	AAV
Aecon Group Inc.	ARE
Aegis Brands Inc.	AEG
Africa Oil Corp.	AOI
Ag Growth International Inc.	AFN
AGF Management Limited	AGF.B
Agnico Eagle Mines Limited	AEM
Aimia Inc.	AIM
Air Canada	AC
AirBoss of America Corp.	BOS
Akita Drilling Ltd.	AKT.A
Alamos Gold Inc.	AGI
Alaris Equity Partners Income Trust	AD.UN
Algoma Central Corporation	ALC
Algoma Steel Group Inc.	ASTL
Algonquin Power & Utilities Corp.	AQN
Alimentation Couche-Tard Inc.	ATD.A
Alithya Group inc.	ALYA
Allied Gold Corp.	AAUC
Allied Properties Real Estate Investment Trust	AP.UN
Almaden Minerals Ltd.	AMM
Almonty Industries Inc.	AII
Alta Copper Corp.	ATCU
AltaGas Ltd.	ALA
Altius Minerals Corporation	ALS
Altus Group Limited	AIF
American Hotel Income Properties REIT LP	HOT.UN
Americas Gold and Silver Corporation	USA
Amerigo Resources Ltd.	ARG
Anaergia Inc.	ANRG
Andean Precious Metals Corp.	APM
Andlauer Healthcare Group Inc.	AND
Andrew Peller Limited	ADW.A
Appili Therapeutics Inc.	APLI
Aptose Biosciences Inc.	APS
ARC Resources Ltd.	ARX
Aris Mining Corporation	ARIS
Aritzia Inc.	ATZ
Arizona Metals Corp.	AMC
Arizona Sonoran Copper Company Inc.	ASCU
Artis Real Estate Investment Trust	AX.DB.F
Ascendant Resources Inc.	ASND
Ascot Resources Ltd	AOT
ATCO Ltd. (Non-voting)	ACO.X
Athabasca Oil Corporation	ATH
AtkinsRéalis Group Inc.	ATRL
Atlantic Power Corporation	ATP
Atrium Mortgage Investment Corporation	AI
ATS Corporation	ATS
Augusta Gold Corp.	G
Aura Minerals Inc.	ORA
Aurinia Pharmaceuticals Inc.	AUP
Aurora Cannabis Inc	ACB
AutoCanada Inc.	ACQ
Automotive Properties Real Estate Investment Trust	APR.UN
Auxly Cannabis Group Inc.	XLY
Avalon Advanced Materials Inc.	AVL
Avant Brands Inc.	AVNT
Avicanna Inc.	AVCN
Avino Silver & Gold Mines Ltd.	ASM
Aya Gold & Silver Inc.	AYA

== See also ==
- Toronto Stock Exchange
- List of Canadian companies
- S&P/TSX Composite Index
