= Companies listed on the Toronto Stock Exchange (G) =

Toronto Stock Exchange listed stocks:

0–9 - A - B - C - D - E - F - G - H - I - J - K - L - M - N - O - P - Q - R - S - T - U - V - W - X - Y - Z

== G ==
Stock Name	Symbol
G Mining Ventures Corp.	GMIN
G2 Goldfields Inc.	GTWO
Galaxy Digital Inc.	GLXY
Galiano Gold Inc.	GAU
Gamehost Inc.	GH
GDI Integrated Facility Services Inc.	GDI
Generation Mining Limited	GENM
Genesis Land Development Corp.	GDC
Geodrill Limited	GEO
George Weston Limited	WN
GFL Environmental Inc.	GFL
Gibson Energy Inc.	GEI
Gildan Activewear Inc.	GIL
Glacier Media Inc.	GVC
Global Atomic Corporation	GLO
Global Education Communities Corp.	GEC
Globex Mining Enterprises Inc.	GMX
goeasy Ltd.	GSY
GoGold Resources Inc.	GGD
Gold Mountain Mining Corp.	GMTN
Gold Springs Resource Corp.	GRC
Golden Minerals Company	AUMN
GoldMining Inc.	GOLD
GoldMoney Inc.	XAU
Goodfellow Inc.	GDL
Goodfood Market Corp.	FOOD
Gran Tierra Energy Inc.	GTE
Granite Real Estate Investment Trust	GRT.UN
Great-West Lifeco Inc.	GWO
Greenfire Resources Ltd.	GFR
GreenFirst Forest Products Inc.	GFP
Greenlane Renewables Inc.	GRN
Groupe Dynamite Inc.	GRGD
Guardian Capital Group Limited	GCG
Gunnison Copper Corp.	GCU
GURU Organic Energy Corp.	GURU

== See also ==
- Toronto Stock Exchange
- List of Canadian companies
- S&P/TSX Composite Index
