= Companies listed on the Toronto Stock Exchange (E) =

Toronto Stock Exchange listed stocks:

0–9 - A - B - C - D - E - F - G - H - I - J - K - L - M - N - O - P - Q - R - S - T - U - V - W - X - Y - Z

== E ==
Stock Name	Symbol
E-L Financial Corporation Limited	ELF
East Side Games Group Inc.	EAGR
Eastern Platinum Limited	ELR
ECN Capital Corp.	ECN
Ecora Royalties plc	ECOR
EcoSynthetix Inc.	ECO
Eldorado Gold Corporation	ELD
Electrovaya Inc.	ELVA
Element Fleet Management Corp.	EFN
Eloro Resources Ltd.	ELO
Else Nutrition Holdings Inc.	BABY
Emera Incorporated	EMA
Empire Company Limited	EMP.A
Enbridge Inc.	ENB
Endeavour Mining plc	EDV
Endeavour Silver Corp.	EDR
Enerflex Ltd.	EFX
Energy Fuels Inc.	EFR
Enghouse Systems Limited	ENGH
Ensign Energy Services Inc.	ESI
Enterprise Group Inc.	E
Enthusiast Gaming Holdings Inc.	EGLX
Entree Resources Ltd.	ETG
EQB Inc.	EQB
Equinox Gold Corp.	EQX
Erdene Resource Development Corporation	ERD
Ero Copper Corp.	ERO
Eupraxia Pharmaceuticals Inc.	EPRX
Euro Sun Mining Inc.	ESM
European Residential Real Estate Investment Trust	ERE.UN
Evertz Technologies Limited	ET
Exco Technologies Limited	XTC
Exro Technologies Inc.	EXRO
Extendicare Inc.	EXE

== See also ==
- Toronto Stock Exchange
- List of Canadian companies
- S&P/TSX Composite Index
