= Companies listed on the Toronto Stock Exchange (C) =

Toronto Stock Exchange listed stocks:

0–9 - A - B - C - D - E - F - G - H - I - J - K - L - M - N - O - P - Q - R - S - T - U - V - W - X - Y - Z

== C ==
Stock Name	Symbol
CAE Inc.	CAE
Caldwell Partners International Inc. (The)	CWL
Caledonia Mining Corporation Plc	CAL
Calfrac Well Services Ltd.	CFW
Calian Group Ltd.	CGY
Calibre Mining Corporation	CBX
Cameco Corporation	CCO
Canaccord Genuity Group Inc.	CF
Canacol Energy Ltd.	CNE
Canada Goose Holdings Inc.	GOOS
Canadian Apartment Properties Real Estate Investment Trust	CAR.UN
Canadian Imperial Bank of Commerce	CM
Canadian National Railway Company	CNR
Canadian Natural Resources Limited	CNQ
Canadian Pacific Kansas City Limited	CP
Canadian Tire Corporation, Limited	CTC
Canadian Utilities Limited	CU
Canagold Resources Ltd.	CCM
Canfor Corporation	CFP
Canfor Pulp Products Inc.	CFX
Canlan Ice Sports Corp.	ICE
Canopy Growth Corporation	WEED
Capital Power Corporation	CPX
Capstone Copper Corp.	CS
Capstone Infrastructure Corporation	CSE
Cardinal Energy Ltd.	CJ
Cardinal Resources Ltd.	CDV
Cardiol Therapeutics Inc.	CRDL
CareRx Corporation	CRRX
Cargojet Inc.	CJT
Caribbean Utilities Company, Ltd.	CUP.U
Cascades Inc.	CAS
CCL Industries Inc.	CCL.A
Celestica Inc.	CLS
CEMATRIX Corporation	CEMX
Cenovus Energy Inc.	CVE
Centerra Gold Inc.	CG
Century Global Commodities Corporation	CNT
Ceres Global Ag Corp.	CRP
CES Energy Solutions Corp.	CEU
CGI Inc.	GIB.A
Champion Iron Limited	CIA
Charlotte's Web Holdings, Inc.	CWEB
Chartwell Retirement Residences	CSH.DB.B
Chemtrade Logistics Income Fund	CHE.DB
China Gold International Resources Corp. Ltd.	CGG
Choice Properties Real Estate Investment Trust	CHP.UN
Chorus Aviation Inc.	CHR.A
CI Financial Corp.	CIX
Cineplex Inc.	CGX
Cipher Pharmaceuticals Inc.	CPH
Clairvest Group Inc.	CVG
Clarke Inc.	CKI
Co-operators General Insurance Company	CCS.PR.C
Cogeco Communications Inc.	CCA
Cogeco Inc.	CGO
Colabor Group Inc.	GCL
Collective Mining Ltd.	CNL
Colliers International Group Inc.	CIG
Computer Modelling Group Ltd.	CMG
Condor Energies Inc.	CDR
Conifex Timber Inc.	CFF
Constellation Software Inc.	CSU
Converge Technology Solutions Corp.	CTS
Coppernico Metals Inc.	COPR
Corby Spirit and Wine Limited	CSW.A
Corus Entertainment Inc.	CJR.B
COSCIENS Biopharma Inc.	CSCI
Coveo Solutions Inc.	CVO
Crescita Therapeutics Inc.	CTX
Crombie Real Estate Investment Trust	CRR.DB.D
Cronos Group Inc.	CRON
Crown Capital Partners Inc.	CRN
CT Real Estate Investment Trust	CRT.UN
CU Inc.	CIU.PR.A
Curaleaf Holdings, Inc.	CURA
Currency Exchange International, Corp.	CXI
Cymbria Corporation	CYB

== See also ==
- Toronto Stock Exchange
- List of Canadian companies
- S&P/TSX Composite Index
