= Companies listed on the Toronto Stock Exchange (P) =

Toronto Stock Exchange listed stocks:

0–9 - A - B - C - D - E - F - G - H - I - J - K - L - M - N - O - P - Q - R - S - T - U - V - W - X - Y - Z

== P ==
Stock Name	Symbol
Paladin Energy Ltd.	PDN
Pan American Silver Corp.	PAAS
Paramount Resources Ltd.	POU
Parex Resources Inc.	PXT
Parkland Corporation	PKI
Pason Systems Inc.	PSI
Pembina Pipeline Corporation	PPL
Perpetua Resources Corp.	PPTA
Perseus Mining Limited	PRU
Pet Valu Holdings Ltd.	PET
PetroTal Corp.	TAL
Petrus Resources Ltd.	PRQ
Peyto Exploration & Development Corp.	PEY
PHX Energy Services Corp.	PHX
Pine Cliff Energy Ltd.	PNE
Pinetree Capital Ltd.	PNP
Pizza Pizza Royalty Corp.	PZA
Platinum Group Metals Ltd.	PTM
Plaza Retail REIT	PLZ.UN
PMET Resources Inc.	PMET
Polaris Renewable Energy Inc.	PIF
Pollard Banknote Limited	PBL
Postmedia Network Canada Corp.	PNC.A
Power Corporation of Canada	POW
Power Financial Corporation	PWF.PF.A
Prairie Provident Resources Inc.	PPR
PrairieSky Royalty Ltd.	PSK
Precision Drilling Corporation	PD
Premium Brands Holdings Corporation	PBH
Primaris Real Estate Investment Trust	PMZ.UN
Prime Mining Corp.	PRYM
PRO Real Estate Investment Trust	PRV.UN
Probe Gold Inc.	PRB
Profound Medical Corp.	PRN
Propel Holdings Inc.	PRL
Pulse Seismic Inc.	PSD
PyroGenesis Inc.	PYR

== See also ==
- Toronto Stock Exchange
- List of Canadian companies
- S&P/TSX Composite Index
