= Bryan Hall (sportscaster) =

Canadian radio presenter

- Born: August 19, 1934 (age 92); Toronto, Ontario, Canada
- Spouse: Lilian Edith Hall (c. 1979–2011; her death)
- Presenting career
- Show: The Hallsy Report
- Station: CHED AM
- Time slot: Monday – Friday; 6:00am – 9:00am MST
- Style: Sports talk
- Country: Canada

Bryan Hall (born August 19, 1934) nicknamed "Hallsy", is a Canadian radio and television personality and retired radio play-by-play broadcaster for the Edmonton Eskimos on 630 CHED in Edmonton, Alberta.

== Career ==
Hall was born on August 19, 1934 in Toronto, Ontario. His father was a lawyer, who died when Hall was 9, and his mother a nurse. Hall got his first broadcasting job at the age of 19, after moving to Edmonton, at CKUA where he did news, a jazz show, and sports. At the suggestion of a columnist for the Edmonton Journal, Hall also took up a vacant sportscaster job at CHED, which he held from 1955 to 1962.

In 1962, Hall moved to Toronto to take up a job covering sports with CHUM, but moved back to Edmonton 3 years later, this time, back to CJCA, where he did play-by-play for the CFL's Edmonton Eskimos with the network from 1965 to 1993. During his time with CJCA, he also pioneered the first open-line sports talk radio show in Edmonton.

In the decade of the '70s, Hall worked as a racetrack announcer at Edmonton Northlands Park calling over 10,000 thoroughbred races. When CJCA ceased broadcasting operations in 1993, Hall moved back to CHED to take up the position of sports director – continuing to do play-by-play of Edmonton Eskimos games until 2009.

After 45 years of play-by-play for Edmonton Eskimos games, Hall retired in 2009. During his play-by-play career, he also did play-by-play for the Edmonton Oilers, Edmonton Oil Kings, and Edmonton Flyers. The media centre, The Bryan Hall Media Centre, in Commonwealth Stadium was named after Hall when he retired in 2009. Though retired from doing play-by-play, Hall continued to appear daily CHED's morning show until 2023, when he transitioned to an ambassador role.

Hall is also known for doing radio advertisements on CHED for local Christenson Developments, Crosstown Motors, and Lay-z-boy Furniture He was inducted into the Canadian Football Hall of Fame in 1989, and the Alberta Sports Hall of Fame in 2004.

== Broadcasting positions ==
- CKUA – 1953–55
- CHED – 1955–62
- CHUM – 1962–65
- CJCA – 1965–93
- CHED – 1993–2023
