= Companies listed on the Toronto Stock Exchange (I) =

Toronto Stock Exchange listed stocks:

0–9 - A - B - C - D - E - F - G - H - I - J - K - L - M - N - O - P - Q - R - S - T - U - V - W - X - Y - Z

== I ==
Stock Name	Symbol
i-80 Gold Corp.	IAU
iA Financial Corporation Inc.	IAG
IAMGOLD Corporation	IMG
iFabric Corp.	IFA
IGM Financial Inc.	IGM
Illumin Holdings Inc.	ILLM
Imperial Metals Corporation	III
Imperial Oil Limited	IMO
Information Services Corporation	ISC
Inovalis Real Estate Investment Trust	INO.UN
InPlay Oil Corp.	IPO
Intact Financial Corporation	IFC
Interfor Corporation	IFP
Intermap Technologies Corporation	IMP
International Petroleum Corporation	IPCO
International Tower Hill Mines Ltd.	ITH
InterRent Real Estate Investment Trust	IIP.UN
Invesque Inc.	IVQ.U
IsoEnergy Ltd.	ISO
Ivanhoe Electric Inc.	IE
Ivanhoe Mines Ltd.	IVN

== See also ==
- Toronto Stock Exchange
- List of Canadian companies
- S&P/TSX Composite Index
