= Canada–Colombia relations =

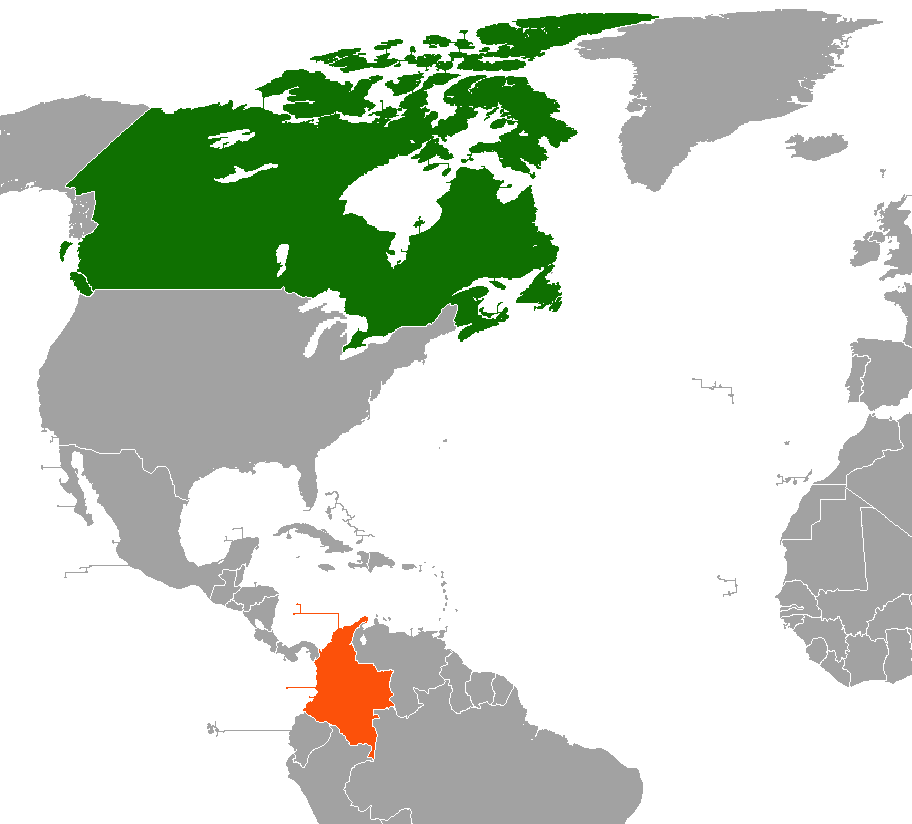

- Canada: Colombia

The nations of Canada and Colombia established diplomatic relations in 1953. Both nations are members of the Organization of American States, OECD and the United Nations.

== History ==
Diplomatic relations between Canada and Colombia began in 1950 and were formalized in 1953. In 1963, Canada opened an embassy in Bogotá.

In 1968, Canadian Foreign Minister Mitchell Sharp led a delegation to Colombia, becoming the first high-level ministerial visit from Canada to Colombia. In 1984, Colombian Foreign Minister, Rodrigo Hernán Lloreda Caicedo, paid a visit to Canada and met with his counterpart Allan MacEachen. During the visit, both nations discussed the Central American peace process and the efforts of the Contadora group.

In April 2001, Colombian President Andrés Pastrana Arango paid a visit to Quebec City to attend the 3rd Summit of the Americas. While in Canada, President Pastrana met with Prime Minister Jean Chrétien. In September 2011, Colombian President Juan Manuel Santos paid a visit to Toronto. That same year, both nations signed the Canada–Colombia Free Trade Agreement.

In April 2012, Canadian Prime Minister Stephen Harper paid a visit to Cartagena, Colombia to attend the 6th Summit of the Americas. In December 2014, Canadian Governor General David Johnston paid a State visit to Colombia. Colombian President Santos returned to Canada in October 2017 for a State visit to Ottawa and met with Prime Minister Justin Trudeau.

The Canadian government has supported the Colombian peace process and offered assistance in clearing mines in the country. In 2023, both nations celebrated 70 years of diplomatic relations.

== High-level visits ==
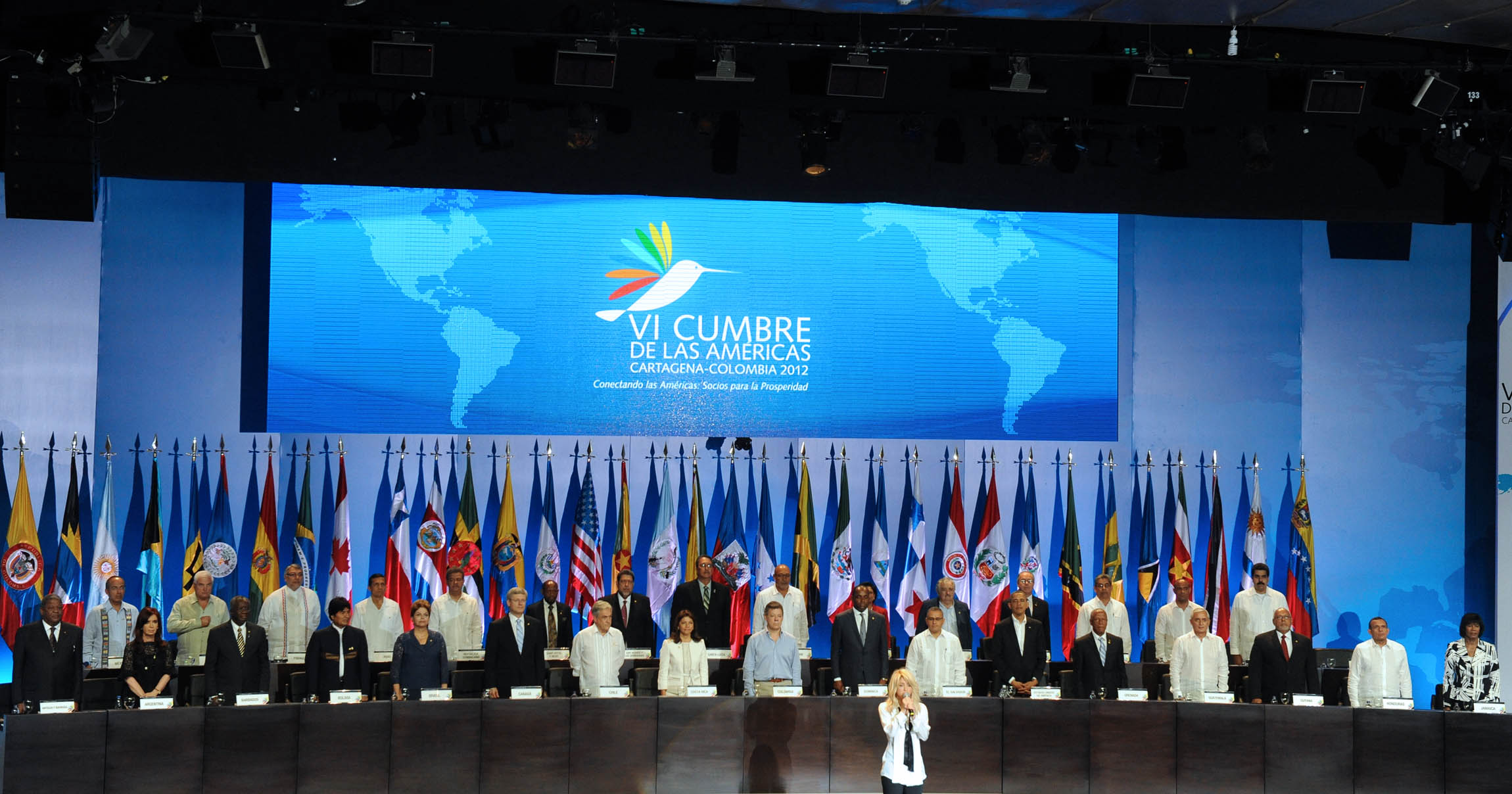
Colombian President Juan Manuel Santos and Canadian Prime Minister Stephen Harper (among other leaders) attending the 6th Summit of the Americas in Cartagena, Colombia; April 2012.

High-level visits from Canada to Colombia

- Foreign Minister Mitchell Sharp (1968)
- Foreign Minister Don Jamieson (1977)
- Foreign Minister Jean-Luc Pépin (1983)
- Foreign Minister Allan MacEachen (1984)
- Prime Minister Stephen Harper (2012)
- Governor General David Johnston (2014)
- Foreign Minister Stéphane Dion (2016)

High-level visits from Colombia to Canada

- Foreign Minister Rodrigo Hernán Lloreda Caicedo (1984)
- Foreign Minister Noemí Sanín (1992)
- Foreign Minister María Emma Mejía Vélez (1997)
- President Andrés Pastrana Arango (2001)
- President Juan Manuel Santos (2011, 2017)
- Vice President Germán Vargas Lleras (2015)

== Transportation ==
There are direct flights between both nations with Air Canada and Avianca.

== Bilateral agreements ==
Both nations have signed a few bilateral agreements such as an Agreement in Technical and Scientific Cooperation (1977); Trade Agreement (1977); Agreement on Labour Cooperation (2011); Agreement on Environmental Cooperation (2011); and a Free Trade Agreement (2011).

== Trade ==
In 2023, trade between Canada and Colombia totaled US$2.6 billion. Canada's main exports to Colombia include: wheat cereals, fertilizers, vegetables, machinery and meat products. Colombia's main exports to Canada include: energy products and coffee. Canadian companies such as Canacol Energy, Gran Tierra Energy, Parex Resources, and Scotiabank (among others) operate in Colombia.

== Resident diplomatic missions ==
of Canada in Colombia

- Bogotá (Embassy)

of Colombia in Canada

- Ottawa (Embassy)
- Calgary (Consulate-General)
- Montreal (Consulate-General)
- Toronto (Consulate-General)
- Vancouver (Consulate-General)

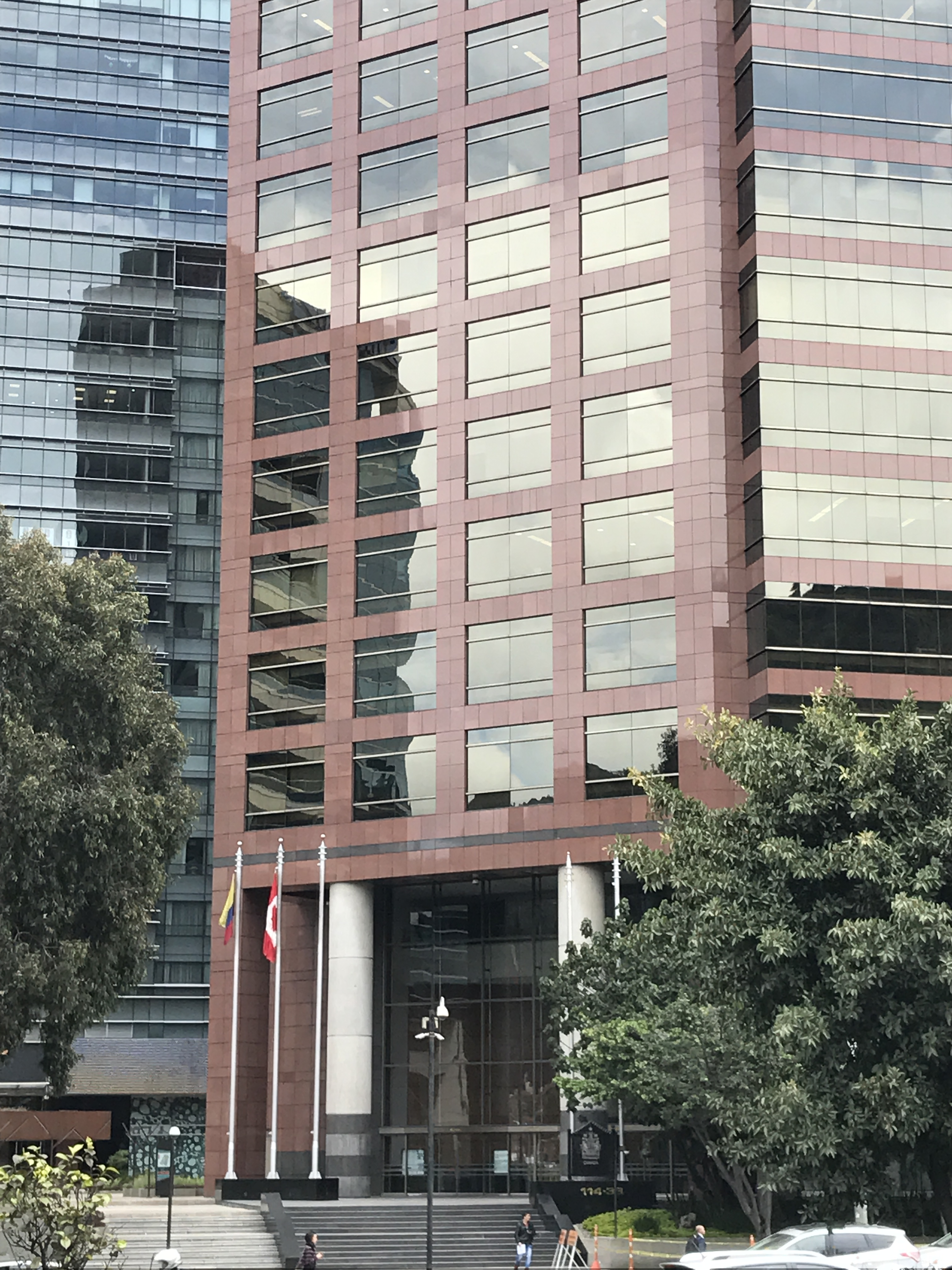
Building hosting the Embassy of Canada in Bogotá

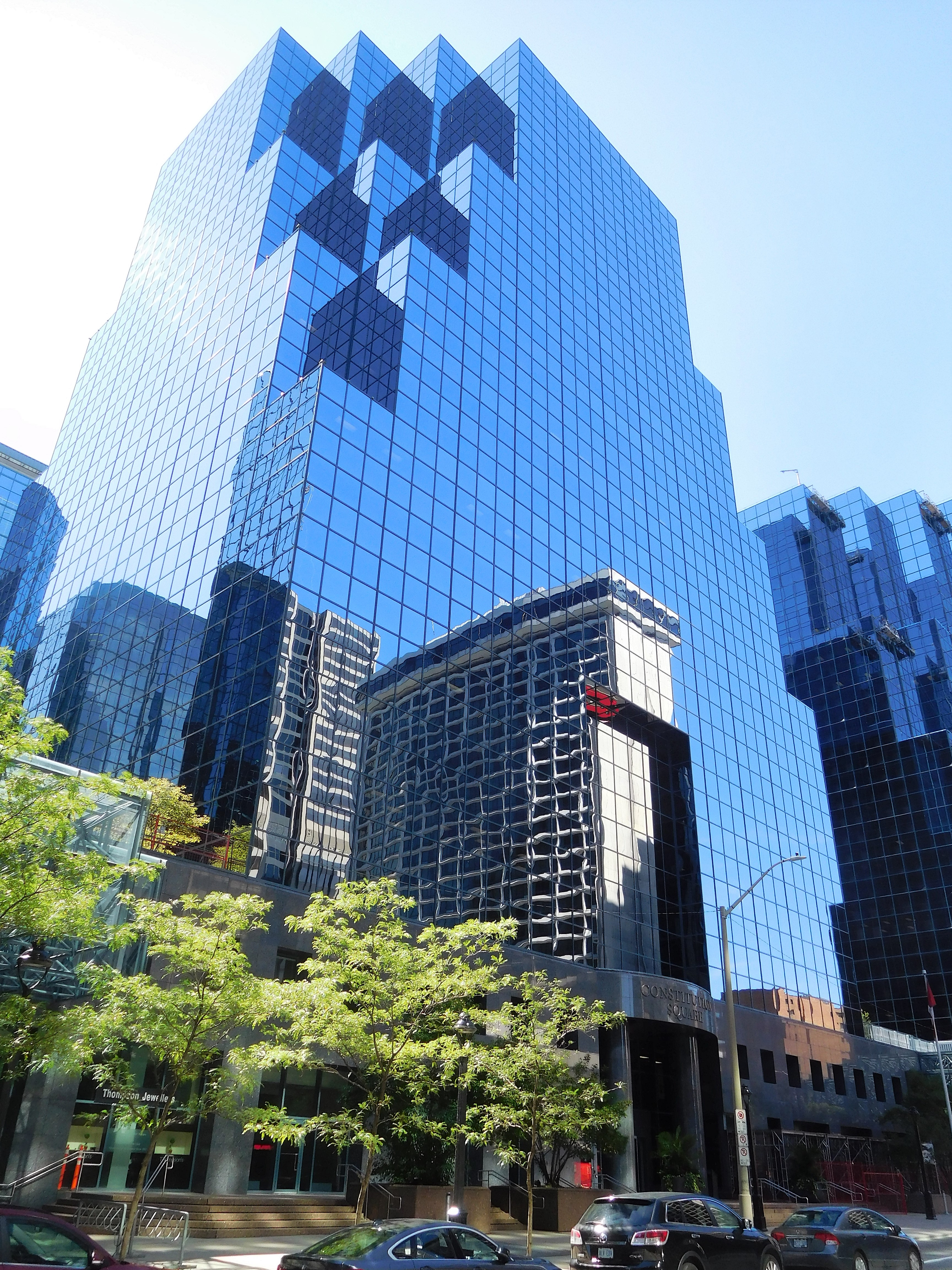
Building hosting the Embassy of Colombia in Ottawa

Consulate-General of Colombia in Calgary

== See also ==
- Foreign relations of Canada
- Foreign relations of Colombia
- Latin American Canadians
