= AirBoss of America =

Canadian chemical and manufacturing company

AirBoss of America Corporation
- Company type: Public
- Traded as: TSX: BOS; OTCQX: ABSSF
- Headquarters: Newmarket, Ontario, Canada
- Divisions: AirBoss Rubber Solutions; AirBoss Manufactured Products
- Website: airboss.com

AirBoss of America is a chemical and manufacturing company based in Toronto, Ontario, Canada, traded on the Toronto Stock Exchange as BOS. It was founded by Alan R. Burns in 1989, focusing on airless rubber treads for skid-steer loaders in the mining industry, first marketed in 1995.

The company was founded as IATCO Industries in 1989, and changed its name to AirBoss in 1994.

The company and its subsidiaries have facilities in Kitchener, Ontario (purchased from ITRM in 1995), Scotland Neck, North Carolina (purchased in 2005), Auburn Hills, Michigan (through the purchase of Flexible Products, an automotive parts producer in 2013),

Acton Vale, Quebec (a winter boot factory, purchased from Acton Vale Co in 1999), and Rock Hill, South Carolina (with the purchase of Ace Elastomer in 2021). By 1997 the company was producing 100 million pounds of rubber for industrial sales, and only using 10% of that to produce tires. The company sold the tire business, and also sold off the consumer footwear division of Acton Vale, keeping the military footwear and industrial supply divisions. The footwear expanded into gloves, gas masks, and firefighter boots.

Bob Hagerman became CEO when the company was founded. Cofounder Gren Schoch became CEO in 2013. In 2017, Chris Bitsakakis joined Schoch as President & Co-CEO. In April 2020, the company received a US$96 million contract from US FEMA for 100,000 powered air respirators as part of the COVID-19 pandemic response. The no-bid sole-source contract was pushed by Peter Navarro, working for the Trump presidency, and facilitated by retired general Jack Keane.

== See also ==
- Dominion Tire Plant
- C-4 Protective Mask
