= Companies listed on the Toronto Stock Exchange (R) =

Toronto Stock Exchange listed stocks:

0–9 - A - B - C - D - E - F - G - H - I - J - K - L - M - N - O - P - Q - R - S - T - U - V - W - X - Y - Z

== R ==
Stock Name	Symbol
Ravelin Properties REIT	RPR.UN
RB Global, Inc.	RBA
Real Matters Inc.	REAL
Restaurant Brands International Inc.	QSR
Restaurant Brands International Limited Partnership	QSP.UN
Resverlogix Corp.	RVX
Richards Group Inc.	RIC
Richelieu Hardware Ltd.	RCH
Rio2 Limited	RIO
RioCan Real Estate Investment Trust	REI.UN
Rockpoint Gas Storage Inc.	RGSI
Rogers Communications Inc.	RCI.A
Rogers Sugar Inc.	RSI
Roots Corporation	ROOT
Royal Bank of Canada	RY
RTG Mining Inc.	RTG
Rubellite Energy Corp.	RBY
Rupert Resources Ltd.	RUP
Russel Metals Inc.	RUS

== See also ==
- Toronto Stock Exchange
- List of Canadian companies
- S&P/TSX Composite Index
