= Companies listed on the Toronto Stock Exchange (W) =

Toronto Stock Exchange listed stocks:

0–9 - A - B - C - D - E - F - G - H - I - J - K - L - M - N - O - P - Q - R - S - T - U - V - W - X - Y - Z

== W ==
Stock Name	Symbol
Wajax Corporation	WJX
Wall Financial Corporation	WFC
Wallbridge Mining Company Limited	WM
Waste Connections, Inc.	WCN
WELL Health Technologies Corp.	WELL
Wesdome Gold Mines Ltd.	WDO
West Fraser Timber Co. Ltd.	WFT
Western Copper and Gold Corporation	WRN
Western Energy Services Corp.	WRG
Western Forest Products Inc.	WEF
Western Resources Corp.	WRX
Westgold Resources Limited	WGX
Westport Fuel Systems Inc.	WPRT
Westshore Terminals Investment Corporation	WTE
Wheaton Precious Metals Corp.	WPM
Whitecap Resources Inc.	WCP
WildBrain Ltd.	WILD
Wilmington Capital Management Inc.	WCM.A
Winpak Ltd.	WPK
WonderFi Technologies Inc.	WNDR
WSP Global Inc.	WSP

== See also ==
- Toronto Stock Exchange
- List of Canadian companies
- S&P/TSX Composite Index
