= Companies listed on the Toronto Stock Exchange (U) =

Toronto Stock Exchange listed stocks:

0–9 - A - B - C - D - E - F - G - H - I - J - K - L - M - N - O - P - Q - R - S - T - U - V - W - X - Y - Z

== U ==
Stock Name	Symbol
Unisync Corp.	UNI
United Corporations Limited	UNC
Ur-Energy Inc.	URE
Uranium Royalty Corp.	URC
Urbana Corporation	URB

== See also ==
- Toronto Stock Exchange
- List of Canadian companies
- S&P/TSX Composite Index
