= Companies listed on the Toronto Stock Exchange (K) =

Toronto Stock Exchange listed stocks:

0–9 - A - B - C - D - E - F - G - H - I - J - K - L - M - N - O - P - Q - R - S - T - U - V - W - X - Y - Z

== K ==
Stock Name	Symbol
K-Bro Linen Inc.	KBL
K92 Mining Inc.	KNT
Karnalyte Resources Inc.	KRN
Kelso Technologies Inc.	KLS
Kelt Exploration Ltd.	KEL
Keyera Corp.	KEY
Killam Apartment Real Estate Investment Trust	KMP.UN
Kinaxis Inc.	KXS
Kinross Gold Corporation	K
Kits Eyecare Ltd.	KITS
Kiwetinohk Energy Corp.	KEC
kneat.com, inc.	KSI
Knight Therapeutics Inc.	GUD
Kolibri Global Energy Inc.	KEI
KP Tissue Inc.	KPT

== See also ==
- Toronto Stock Exchange
- List of Canadian companies
- S&P/TSX Composite Index
