= GEC (company) =

- Type: Public
- Traded as: TSX: GEC
- Industry: Education
- Founded: 1994
- Headquarters: Vancouver, British Columbia, Canada
- Key people: Toby Chu (CEO)
- Website: gechq.com

Global Education Communities (GEC), formerly known as CIBT Education Group, is a student housing and education investment company based in Vancouver, British Columbia.

== History ==
GEC was founded in 1994 as Capital Alliance Group Inc, changed its name to CIBT Education Group Inc, and Global Education Communities Corp (GEC) in 2023.

In 1995, GEC partnered with City University of Seattle to deliver City University's MBA programs in China.

In 2005, the joint program between GEC and City University Seattle was recognized by the World Manager Weekly as one of the influential Sino-Foreign Joint MBA Program in China.

In 2008, GEC acquired a 75 percent stake in Target, a provider of practical nursing and health-related training.

In 2010, GEC acquired the Vancouver-based KGIC Education Group, with seven campuses in Canada and facilities in Brazil, China, Japan, Korea, Mexico, and Taiwan.

In 2013, GEC sold KGIC Education Group to a Toronto-based public company for $13.5 million.

In 2014, GEC established the GEC Pearson campus-housing complex in the southwest region of Vancouver. In the same year, GEC initiated the Global Education Centre project in Richmond. The development includes a 313-room hotel for international students and a nine-storey building with classrooms for private educators.

In 2015, GEC acquired Viva Hotel in downtown Vancouver to convert into student housing.

In 2016, GEC announced a plan to develop a 50-storey, $200-million educational facility on the site of the former Stardust roller rink in the city centre of Surrey. The project was named the GEC Education Mega Centre.

In 2017, GEC acquired KGIC Education Group from the Toronto-based public company for $3.5 million and renamed it as Sprott Shaw Language College.

In January 2019, GEC purchased three land parcels at Oakridge to develop GEC Oakridge, a rental apartment near the Oakridge Shopping Centre in Vancouver.

In June 2020, GEC acquired two apartment buildings, providing up to 254 additional student beds.

In 2021, GEC received approval to develop GEC Cybercity, an education campus centre in Richmond.

In July 2023, GEC completed construction and launched GEC King Edward with 188 student housing beds near the King Edward subway station.

== Education services ==
- Sprott-Shaw Community College in British Columbia, Canada
- Sprott Shaw Language College in Vancouver, Canada
- Sprott Shaw Language College in Toronto, Canada
- Vancouver International College
- Global Education Alliance Inc.

== Real estate services ==
=== Current – operational properties ===
GEC operates six properties:

- GEC Pearson – North and South Towers
- GEC Burnaby Heights
- GEC Granville Suites Hotel
- GEC Marine Gateway – North and South Towers
- GEC Viva
- GEC King Edward

=== Projects under construction/development ===
- GEC Oakridge
- GEC Education Mega Centre in Surrey
- GEC Education Super Centre
- GEC Cyber City
