= Companies listed on the Toronto Stock Exchange (T) =

Toronto Stock Exchange listed stocks:

0–9 - A - B - C - D - E - F - G - H - I - J - K - L - M - N - O - P - Q - R - S - T - U - V - W - X - Y - Z

== T ==
Stock Name	Symbol
Taiga Building Products Ltd.	TBL
Talisker Resources Ltd.	TSK
Talon Metals Corp.	TLO
Tamarack Valley Energy Ltd.	TVE
Tantalus Systems Holding Inc.	GRID
Taseko Mines Limited	TKO
TC Energy Corporation	TRP
Teck Resources Limited	TECK.A
TECSYS Inc.	TCS
Telesat Corporation	TSAT
TELUS Corporation	T
Tenaz Energy Corp.	TNZ
TeraGo Inc.	TGO
TerrAscend Corp.	TSND
TerraVest Industries Inc.	TVK
TFI International Inc.	TFII
Thinkific Labs Inc.	THNC
Thomson Reuters Corporation	TRI
Tidewater Midstream and Infrastructure Ltd.	TWM
Tidewater Renewables Ltd.	LCFS
Tilray Brands, Inc.	TLRY
Timbercreek Financial Corp.	TF
Tiny Ltd.	TINY
Titan Mining Corporation	TI
Titanium Transportation Group Inc.	TTNM
TMX Group Limited	X
Topaz Energy Corp.	TPZ
Torex Gold Resources Inc.	TXG
Toromont Industries Ltd.	TIH
Toronto-Dominion Bank	TD
Total Energy Services Inc.	TOT
Touchstone Exploration Inc.	TXP
Tourmaline Oil	TOU
TransAlta Corporation	TA
Transat A.T. Inc.	TRZ
Transcontinental Inc.	TCL.A
Tree Island Steel Ltd.	TSL
Trican Well Service Ltd.	TCW
Trilogy Metals Inc.	TMQ
Triple Flag Precious Metals Corp.	TFPM
Trisura Group Ltd.	TSU
Troilus Mining Corp.	TLG
True North Commercial Real Estate Investment Trust	TNT.UN
TRX Gold Corporation	TRX
Tucows Inc.	TC
TVA Group Inc.	TVA.B
TWC Enterprises Limited	TWC

== See also ==
- Toronto Stock Exchange
- List of Canadian companies
- S&P/TSX Composite Index
