= Companies listed on the Toronto Stock Exchange (J) =

Toronto Stock Exchange listed stocks:

0–9 - A - B - C - D - E - F - G - H - I - J - K - L - M - N - O - P - Q - R - S - T - U - V - W - X - Y - Z

== J ==
Stock Name	Symbol
Jaguar Mining Inc.	JAG
Jamieson Wellness Inc.	JWEL
Journey Energy Inc.	JOY

== See also ==
- Toronto Stock Exchange
- List of Canadian companies
- S&P/TSX Composite Index
