= Companies listed on the Toronto Stock Exchange (L) =

Toronto Stock Exchange listed stocks:

0–9 - A - B - C - D - E - F - G - H - I - J - K - L - M - N - O - P - Q - R - S - T - U - V - W - X - Y - Z

== L ==
Stock Name	Symbol
Labrador Iron Ore Royalty Corporation	LIF
Laramide Resources Ltd.	LAM
Largo Inc.	LGO
Lassonde Industries Inc.	LAS.A
Laurentian Bank of Canada	LB
Leon's Furniture Limited	LNF
Liberty Gold Corp.	LGD
Lightspeed Commerce Inc.	LSPD
Linamar Corporation	LNR
Lithium Americas Corp.	LAC
Lithium Argentina AG	LAR
Lithium Royalty Corp.	LIRC
Loblaw Companies Limited	L
Loncor Gold Inc.	LN
Lucara Diamond Corp.	LUC
Lundin Gold Inc.	LUG
Lundin Mining Corporation	LUN

== See also ==
- Toronto Stock Exchange
- List of Canadian companies
- S&P/TSX Composite Index
