= Companies listed on the Toronto Stock Exchange (B) =

Toronto Stock Exchange listed stocks:

0–9 - A - B - C - D - E - F - G - H - I - J - K - L - M - N - O - P - Q - R - S - T - U - V - W - X - Y - Z

== B ==
Stock Name	Symbol
B2Gold Corp.	BTO
Badger Infrastructure Solutions Ltd.	BDGI
Ballard Power Systems Inc.	BLD
Bank of Montreal	BMO
Bank of Nova Scotia	BNS
Barrick Mining Corporation	ABX
Bausch + Lomb Corporation	BLCO
Bausch Health Companies Inc.	BHC
Baylin Technologies Inc.	BYL
Baytex Energy Corp.	BTE
BCE Inc.	BCE
Becker Milk Company Ltd. (The)	BEK.B
Belo Sun Mining Corp.	BSX
Bengal Energy Ltd.	BNG
Beyond Oil Ltd.	BOIL
Big Rock Brewery Inc.	BR
Birchcliff Energy Ltd.	BIR
Birchtech Corp.	BCHT
Bird Construction Inc.	BDT
Bitfarms Ltd.	BITF
Black Diamond Group Limited	BDI
Black Iron Inc.	BKI
BlackBerry Limited	BB
Blossom Gold Inc.	BGAU
Blue Ant Media Corporation	BAMI
BMTC Group Inc.	GBT
Boardwalk Real Estate Investment Trust	BEI.UN
Bombardier Inc.	BBD.A
Bonterra Energy Corp.	BNE
Boston Pizza Royalties Income Fund	BPF.UN
Boyd Group Services Inc.	BYD
Bragg Gaming Group Inc.	BRAG
Bri-Chem Corp.	BRY
BriaCell Therapeutics Corp.	BCT
Bridgemarq Real Estate Services Inc.	BRE
Brookfield Asset Management Inc.	BAM
Brookfield Business Corporation	BBUC
Brookfield Corporation	BN
Brookfield Infrastructure Corporation	BIPC
Brookfield Infrastructure L.P.	BILP.PR.A
Brookfield Infrastructure Partners L.P.	BIP.UN
Brookfield Office Properties Inc.	BPO.PR.A
Brookfield Property Preferred L.P.	BPYP.PR.A
Brookfield Renewable Corporation	BEPC
Brookfield Renewable Partners L.P	BEP.UN
Brookfield Wealth Solutions Ltd.	BNT
BRP Inc.	DOO
BSR Real Estate Investment Trust	HOM.U
BTB Real Estate Investment Trust	BTB.UN
Bunker Hill Mining Corp.	BNKR
Burcon Nutrascience Corporation	BU

Completed

== See also ==
- Toronto Stock Exchange
- List of Canadian companies
- S&P/TSX Composite Index
