= China Gold International Resources Corporation =

China Gold International Resources Corp. Ltd.
- Native name: 中国黄金国际资源有限公司
- Type: Public
- Traded as: TSX: CGG, SEHK: 2099
- Industry: Mining
- Headquarters: Vancouver, British Columbia, Canada
- Products: Gold, copper, silver, molybdenum
- Revenue: US$756.6 million (2024)
- Net income: US$65.3 million (2024)
- Website: chinagoldintl.com

China Gold International Resources Corp. Ltd. (TSX: CGG, SEHK: 2099) is a Canadian-based gold and base metals producer headquartered in Vancouver, British Columbia. The company operates in the People's Republic of China, with assets including the CSH Gold Mine in Inner Mongolia and the Jiama Copper-Gold Polymetallic Mine in the Tibet Autonomous Region.

== Corporate Structure ==
China Gold International serves as the sole overseas vehicle of China National Gold Group Corporation (CNG), the largest gold producer in China. CNG holds a 40.01% interest in the company, offering strategic support, technical expertise, and access to capital resources.

== Operations ==
The company's main operating mines are:

- CSH Gold Mine: An open-pit, heap-leach gold mine located in Inner Mongolia, in commercial production since 2008.
- Jiama Copper-Gold Polymetallic Mine: A large-scale polymetallic project in the Tibet Autonomous Region, producing copper, gold, molybdenum, silver, lead, and zinc since 2010.

In 2024, China Gold International reported a significant increase in both gold and copper production. Gold output rose by 10%, reaching 162,652 ounces compared to 147,963 ounces in 2023. Copper production increased sharply by 139%, totaling 105.7 million pounds (approximately 47,929 tonnes), up from 44.2 million pounds (around 20,051 tonnes) in the prior year.

In January 2025, the company issued its production guidance for the year, forecasting stable gold and copper output. It also confirmed that operations at the Jiama Mine remained unaffected by a recent earthquake in the region.

== Legal Issues ==
On March 29, 2013, a landslide at the Jiama mine site in Tibet buried 83 workers. In response, Canada's National Contact Point for the OECD received a Request for Review regarding the company's activities in the Gyama Valley. In 2015, the NCP issued a final statement making six recommendations on disclosure, labor practices, environmental management, and human rights.
