= Exco Technologies =

Canadian tool and die supplier

Exco Technologies Limited.
- Company type: Public
- Traded as: TSX: XTC
- Industry: Machine Tools & Accessories
- Headquarters: Markham, Ontario, Canada
- Key people: Brian A. Robbins
- Number of employees: Approx. 6000
- Website: www.excocorp.com

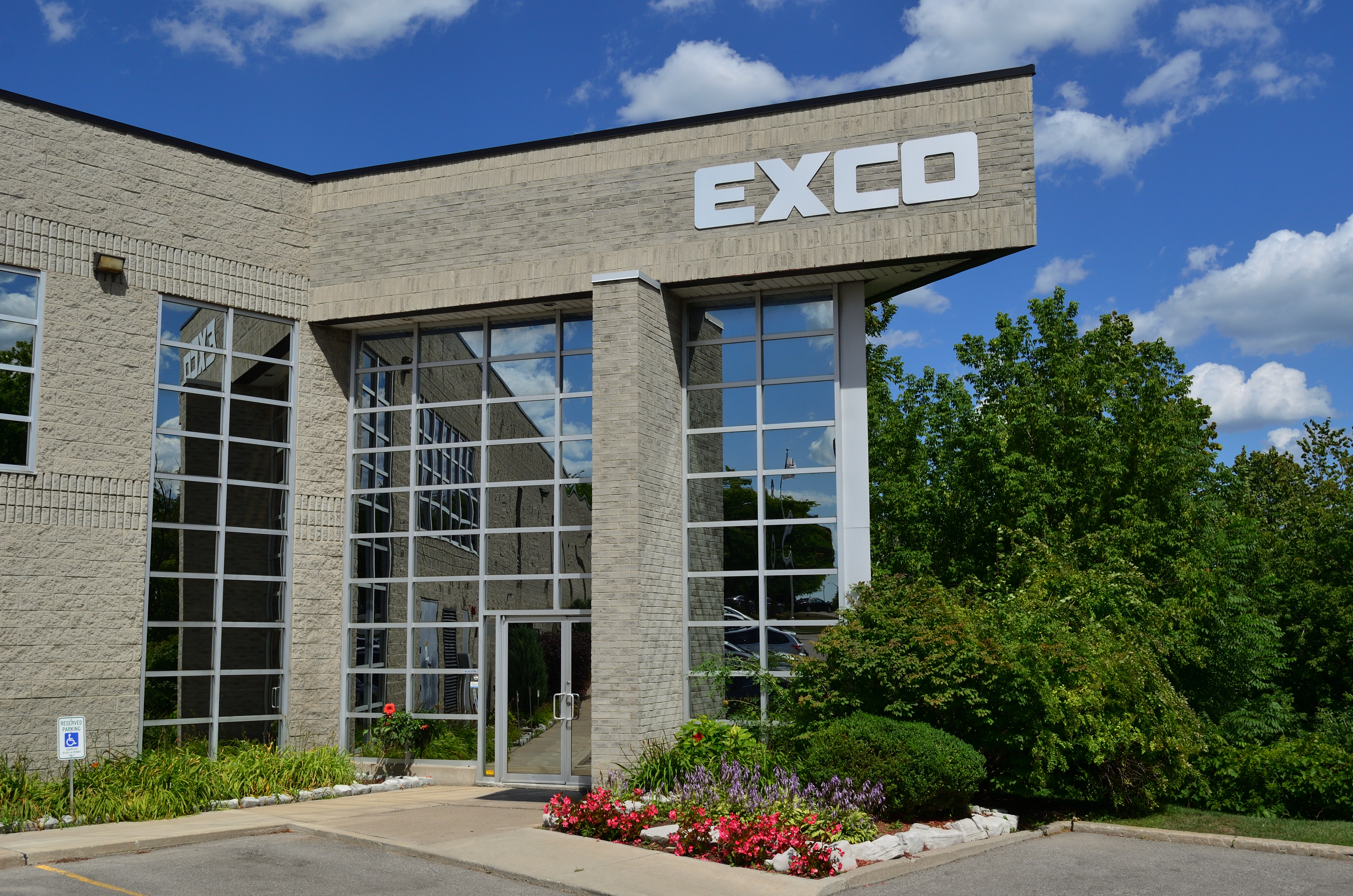
Exco Technologies office in Markham

Exco Technologies Limited is a Canadian global designer, developer, and manufacturer of dies, molds, components, assemblies, and consumable equipment founded in 1952. This equipment is made for the die-cast, extrusion, and automotive industries. This company has 20 manufacturing locations in 10 countries and approximately 5,000 employees. It is incorporated and domiciled in Canada, and is headquartered in Markham, Ontario.

The company's Castool division, which designs and manufactures tooling systems for die cast machines and extrusion presses, purchased all shares of Allper AG in 2010. Allper AG was a Swiss corporation, that designs and markets proprietary consumable die cast tooling.
