= Companies listed on the Toronto Stock Exchange (V) =

Toronto Stock Exchange listed stocks:

0–9 - A - B - C - D - E - F - G - H - I - J - K - L - M - N - O - P - Q - R - S - T - U - V - W - X - Y - Z

== V ==
Stock Name	Symbol
Valeura Energy Inc.	VLE
Vecima Networks Inc.	VCM
Velan Inc.	VLN
Verde Agritech Ltd.	NPK
Vermilion Energy Inc.	VET
VersaBank	VBNK
Versamet Royalties Corporation	VMET
VerticalScope Holdings Inc.	FORA
Vertiqal Studios Corp.	VRTS
Vista Gold Corp.	VGZ
Vitalhub Corp.	VHI
Vizsla Silver Corp.	VZLA
Vox Royalty Corp.	VOXR

== See also ==
- Toronto Stock Exchange
- List of Canadian companies
- S&P/TSX Composite Index
