= Companies listed on the Toronto Stock Exchange (H) =

Toronto Stock Exchange listed stocks:

0–9 - A - B - C - D - E - F - G - H - I - J - K - L - M - N - O - P - Q - R - S - T - U - V - W - X - Y - Z

== H ==
Stock Name	Symbol
H&R Real Estate Investment Trust	HR.UN
Haivision Systems Inc.	HAI
Hammond Manufacturing Company Limited	HMM.A
Hammond Power Solutions Inc.	HPS.A
Headwater Exploration Inc.	HWX
HealWELL AI Inc.	AIDX
Helios Fairfax Partners Corporation	HFPC.U
Helix BioPharma Corp.	HBP
High Arctic Energy Services Inc.	HWO
High Liner Foods Incorporated	HLF
Highlander Silver Corp.	HSLV
HLS Therapeutics Inc.	HLS
Hudbay Minerals Inc.	HBM
Hut 8 Corp.	HUT
Hydro One Limited	H

== See also ==
- Toronto Stock Exchange
- List of Canadian companies
- S&P/TSX Composite Index
