= Companies listed on the Toronto Stock Exchange (D) =

Toronto Stock Exchange listed stocks:

0–9 - A - B - C - D - E - F - G - H - I - J - K - L - M - N - O - P - Q - R - S - T - U - V - W - X - Y - Z

== D ==
Stock Name	Symbol
D-Box Technologies Inc.	DBO
D2L Inc.	DTOL
Data Communications Management Corp.	DCM
Dayforce, Inc.	DAY
Definity Financial Corporation	DFY
Denison Mines Corp.	DML
dentalcorp Holdings Ltd.	DNTL
Descartes Systems Group Inc.	DSG
Dexterra Group Inc.	DXT
DIRTT Environmental Solutions Ltd.	DRT
Discovery Silver Corp.	DSV
Diversified Royalty Corp.	DIV
Docebo Inc.	DCBO
Dollarama Inc.	DOL
Doman Building Materials Group Ltd.	DBM
Dominion Lending Centres Inc.	DLCG
Dorel Industries Inc.	DII.A
Dream Impact Trust	MPCT.UN
Dream Industrial Real Estate Investment Trust	DIR.UN
Dream Office Real Estate Investment Trust	D.UN
Dream Residential Real Estate Investment Trust	DRR.UN
DREAM Unlimited Corp.	DRM
DRI Healthcare Trust	DHT.UN
Dundee Corporation	DC.A
Dundee Precious Metals Inc.	DPM
Dye & Durham Limited	DND
dynaCERT Inc.	DYA
Dynacor Group Inc.	DNG

== See also ==
- Toronto Stock Exchange
- List of Canadian companies
- S&P/TSX Composite Index
