= Pollard Banknote =

Canadian company

Pollard Banknote Income Fund
- Type: Public
- Industry: Business Services
- Headquarters: Winnipeg, Manitoba, Canada
- Key people: John Pollard
- Website: www.pollardbanknote.com

Pollard Banknote Income Fund (TSX: PBL) traces its roots back to 1907 to the Saults & Pollard commercial printing company in Winnipeg, Manitoba, Canada. In the mid-1970s, the company made a move into security printing which entailed production of stamps, stocks, bonds and government documents. In the mid-1980s Pollard Banknote began printing for government lotteries in Canada, the United States and the world.

The company has five facilities with approximately 1,200 personnel serving over 45 lotteries.

The corporate head office is in Winnipeg, Manitoba, Canada.
