= Ecora Royalties =

Royalty company

Ecora Royalties PLC
- Company type: Public
- Traded as: LSE: ECOR; TSX: ECOR
- Industry: Finance
- Founded: 1967; 59 years ago
- Headquarters: London, UK
- Key people: Andrew Webb, Chairman; Marc Bishop Lafleche, CEO
- Revenue: ▼£59.6 million (2024
- Operating income: ▼£39.5 million (2024)
- Net income: ▼£(9.8) million (2024)
- Website: www.ecoraroyalties.com

Ecora Royalties PLC is a royalty and streaming company providing capital to the mining sector. Its activities are primarily in Australia, North and South America, and Europe. The company is listed on the London and Toronto Stock Exchanges.

== History ==
The company was founded as "Diversified Bank Shares Limited" in 1967. It was first listed on the Unlisted Securities Market in 1984 and started to acquire Australian oil, gas and mining assets in 1989. It was first listed on the London Stock Exchange in 1996 and adopted the name Anglo Pacific Group in 1997.

It completed its exit from the thermal coal market with the sale of its royalty income from a mine in Narrabri in Australia in December 2021.

It adopted the name Ecora Resources PLC in October 2022, and Ecora Royalties in January 2026.
