= Companies listed on the Toronto Stock Exchange (N) =

Toronto Stock Exchange listed stocks:

0–9 - A - B - C - D - E - F - G - H - I - J - K - L - M - N - O - P - Q - R - S - T - U - V - W - X - Y - Z

== N ==
Stock Name	Symbol
Nano One Materials Corp.	NANO
NanoXplore Inc.	GRA
National Bank of Canada	NA
Neo Performance Materials Inc.	NEO
New Gold Inc.	NGD
New Pacific Metals Corp.	NUAG
Newmont Corporation	NGT
NexGen Energy Ltd.	NXE
NextSource Materials Inc.	NEXT
Nexus Industrial REIT	NXR.UN
NFI Group Inc.	NFI
NGEx Minerals Ltd.	NGEX
North American Construction Group Ltd.	NOA
The North West Company Inc.	NWC
Northcliff Resources Ltd.	NCF
Northern Dynasty Minerals Ltd.	NDM
Northland Power Inc.	NPI
Northview Residential REIT	NRR.UN
Northwest Healthcare Properties Real Estate Investment Trust	NWH.UN
Nouveau Monde Graphite Inc.	NOU
NovaGold Resources Inc.	NG
Novo Resources Corp.	NVO
Numinus Wellness Inc.	NUMI
Nutrien Ltd.	NTR
NuVista Energy Ltd.	NVA
NXT Energy Solutions	SFD

== See also ==
- Toronto Stock Exchange
- List of Canadian companies
- S&P/TSX Composite Index
