= Euromethod =

Euromethod is a method for managing procurement processes of Information Services. It focuses on contract management.

Euromethod consists of three books: a reference manual, a dictionary and a collection of annexes. Euromethod's first release was in 1996.

It has evolved into the Information Services Procurement Library (ISPL), which has published a set of manuals.

== History ==
Euromethod is the result of a European project ordered and funded by DGIII (Industry) of the European Commission. It has been achieved by a consortium containing Sema Group (France), BT Group (UK), Cap-Volmac (The Netherlands), CGI (France), Datacentralen (Denmark), EMSC (Consortium of Bull-Olivetti-Siemens), Finsiel (Italy), INA (Portugal), Indra (Spain), and Softlab (Germany). The project Director was Marcel Franckson. The reference version has been written in English. It has been translated into French, German, Italian, Spanish, Portuguese, Dutch and Danish.
