= Companies listed on the Toronto Stock Exchange (M) =

Toronto Stock Exchange listed stocks:

0–9 - A - B - C - D - E - F - G - H - I - J - K - L - M - N - O - P - Q - R - S - T - U - V - W - X - Y - Z

== M ==
Stock Name	Symbol
Madison Pacific Properties Inc.	MPC
MAG Silver Corp.	MAG
Magellan Aerospace Corporation	MAL
Magna International Inc.	MG
Mainstreet Equity Corp.	MEQ
Major Drilling Group International Inc.	MDI
Manulife Financial Corporation	MFC
Maple Leaf Foods Inc.	MFI
Marimaca Copper Corp.	MARI
Martinrea International Inc.	MRE
Mattr Corp.	MATR
Maxim Power Corp.	MXG
MCAN Mortgage Corporation	MKP
McCoy Global Inc.	MCB
McEwen Inc.	MUX
MDA Space Ltd.	MDA
Medexus Pharmaceuticals Inc.	MDP
Medical Facilities Corporation	DR
Medicenna Therapeutics Corp.	MDNA
MediPharm Labs Corp.	LABS
MEG Energy Corp.	MEG
Mega Uranium Ltd.	MGA
Melcor Developments Ltd.	MRD
Meren Energy Inc.	MER
Meridian Mining UK Societas	MNO
Methanex Corporation	MX
Metro Inc.	MRU
Microbix Biosystems Inc.	MBX
Minco Silver Corporation	MSV
Mineros S.A.	MSA
Minto Apartment Real Estate Investment Trust	MI.UN
Mogo Inc.	MOGO
Molson Coors Canada Inc.	TPX.A
Montage Gold Corp.	MAU
Morguard Corporation	MRC
Morguard North American Residential Real Estate Investment Trust	MRG.DB.B
Morguard Real Estate Investment Trust	MRT.DB.A
Mountain Province Diamonds Inc.	MPVD
MTY Food Group Inc.	MTY
Mullen Group Ltd.	MTL

== See also ==
- Toronto Stock Exchange
- List of Canadian companies
- S&P/TSX Composite Index
