= Companies listed on the Toronto Stock Exchange (F) =

Toronto Stock Exchange listed stocks:

0–9 - A - B - C - D - E - F - G - H - I - J - K - L - M - N - O - P - Q - R - S - T - U - V - W - X - Y - Z

== F ==
Stock Name	Symbol
Fairfax Financial Holdings Limited	FFH
Fairfax India Holdings Corporation	FIH.U
Faraday Copper Corp.	FDY
Fennec Pharmaceuticals Inc.	FRX
Fiera Capital Corporation	FSZ
Finning International Inc.	FTT
Firan Technology Group Corporation	FTG
FireFly Metals Ltd.	FFM
Firm Capital Mortgage Investment Corporation	FC
First Capital REIT	FCR.UN
First Majestic Silver Corp.	FR
First Mining Gold Corp.	FF
First National Financial Corporation	FN
First Quantum Minerals Ltd.	FM
FirstService Corporation	FSV
Flagship Communities Real Estate Investment Trust	MHC.UN
FLINT Corp.	FLNT
Flow Beverage Corp.	FLOW
Foraco International SA	FAR
Foran Mining Corporation	FOM
Forsys Metals Corp.	FSY
Fortis Inc.	FTS
Fortress Paper Ltd.	FTP
Fortuna Mining Corp.	FVI
Fortune Minerals Limited	FT
Franco-Nevada Corporation	FNV
Freegold Ventures Limited	FVL
Freehold Royalties Ltd.	FRU
Frontera Energy Corporation	FEC
Fury Gold Mines Ltd.	FURY

== See also ==
- Toronto Stock Exchange
- List of Canadian companies
- S&P/TSX Composite Index
