= Companies listed on the Toronto Stock Exchange (X) =

Toronto Stock Exchange listed stocks:

0–9 - A - B - C - D - E - F - G - H - I - J - K - L - M - N - O - P - Q - R - S - T - U - V - W - X - Y - Z

== X ==
Stock Name	Symbol
Xtra-Gold Resources Corp.	XTG
Xtract One Technologies Inc.	XTRA

== See also ==
- Toronto Stock Exchange
- List of Canadian companies
- S&P/TSX Composite Index
