= Companies listed on the Toronto Stock Exchange (O) =

Toronto Stock Exchange listed stocks:

0–9 - A - B - C - D - E - F - G - H - I - J - K - L - M - N - O - P - Q - R - S - T - U - V - W - X - Y - Z

== O ==
Stock Name orosur	Symbol omi
Obsidian Energy Ltd.	OBE
OceanaGold Corporation	OGC
Olympia Financial Group Inc.	OLY
ONEX Corporation	ONEX
Open Text Corporation	OTEX
Optiva Inc.	OPT
OR Royalties Inc.	OR
Orbit Garant Drilling Inc.	OGD
Orezone Gold Corporation	ORE
Organigram Global Inc.	OGI
Orla Mining Ltd	OLA
Orvana Minerals Corp.	ORV
Osisko Metals Incorporated	OM
Ovintiv Inc.	OVV

== See also ==
- Toronto Stock Exchange
- List of Canadian companies
- S&P/TSX Composite Index
