= Companies listed on the Toronto Stock Exchange (S) =

Toronto Stock Exchange listed stocks:

0–9 - A - B - C - D - E - F - G - H - I - J - K - L - M - N - O - P - Q - R - S - T - U - V - W - X - Y - Z

== S ==
Stock Name	Symbol
Sagen MI Canada Inc.	MIC.PR.A
Sagicor Financial Company Ltd.	SFC
Saltire Capital Ltd.	SLT
Sangoma Technologies Corporation	STC
Saputo Inc.	SAP
Satellos Bioscience Inc.	MSCL
Saturn Oil & Gas Inc.	SOIL
Savaria Corporation	SIS
Seabridge Gold Inc.	SEA
Secure Waste Infrastructure Corp.	SES
Sentry Select Primary Metals Corp.	PME
Senvest Capital Inc.	SEC
Serabi Gold plc	SBI
Sernova Biotherapeutics Inc.	SVA
Sherritt International Corporation	S
Shopify Inc.	SHOP
Sienna Senior Living Inc.	SIA
Silver Bear Resources plc	SBR
Silver Bull Resources, Inc.	SVB
Silver Elephant Mining Corp.	ELEF
Silvercorp Metals Inc.	SVM
SIR Royalty Income Fund	SRV.UN
Skeena Resources Limited	SKE
Slate Grocery REIT	SGR.UN
SmartCentres Real Estate Investment Trust	SRU.UN
Solaris Resources Inc.	SLS
Solitario Resources Corp.	SLR
Solution Financial Inc.	SFI
Source Energy Services Ltd.	SHLE
South Bow Corporation	SOBO
Southern Cross Gold Consolidated Ltd.	SXGC
Spartan Delta Corp.	SDE
Spectral Medical Inc.	EDT
Spin Master Corp.	TOY
Sprott Inc.	SII
SSR Mining Inc.	SSR
St. Augustine Gold and Copper Limited	SAU
Stack Capital Group Inc.	STCK
Stantec Inc.	STN
Star Diamond Corporation	DIAM
Starcore International Mines Ltd.	SAM
Stella-Jones Inc.	SJ
STEP Energy Services Ltd.	STEP
Steppe Gold Ltd.	STGO
Stingray Group Inc.	RAY.A
STLLR Gold Inc.	STLR
StorageVault Canada Inc.	SVI
Strathcona Resources Ltd.	SCR
Sun Life Financial Inc.	SLF
Suncor Energy Inc.	SU
SunOpta, Inc.	SOY
Superior Plus Corp.	SPB
Supremex Inc.	SXP
Surge Energy Inc.	SGY
Swiss Water Decaffeinated Coffee Inc.	SWP
Sylogist Ltd.	SYZ

== See also ==
- Toronto Stock Exchange
- List of Canadian companies
- S&P/TSX Composite Index
