= Participatory information service =

A participatory information service consists of an information provider which helps receivers to find answers to their questions. It is related to collaborative services, " that (...) ask for the direct and active involvement of all the interested actors, final users included, [to be performed]".

The development of participatory information services is due to global societal and economic changes of this century: the internet era, the information age and the learning organization. The availability of resources, such as personal data and general information, together with information and communications technology tools have created a perfect match for sharing knowledge through the web involving users and/or consumers participation.

The difference between an information service and a participatory information service is that the former one is a service that provides information to a user. In this process, the information flow is one-way. Whereas, the latter one is based on the culture of participation and the information flow is two-ways.

Wikipedia is a good example of participatory information service. On the one hand, The Team Wikipedia manages the platform by providing instructions about writing or modifying articles, approving the contents and publishing them on the website. On the other hand, every user can create a new article and/or edit an existing one in a climate of high degree of mutual trust and relational qualities.
