= Information Services Corporation =

Canadian data management company

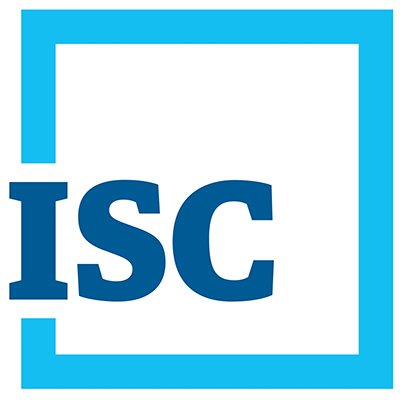

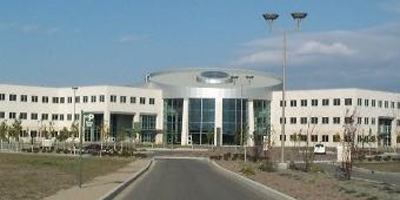
- ISC's head office in Regina
- Company type: Public company
- Traded as: TSX: ISC
- Industry: Registry & Information Management
- Predecessor: Information Services Corporation of Saskatchewan
- Founded: 2000
- Headquarters: 300 - 10 Research Drive, Regina, Saskatchewan, Canada S4S 7J7
- Area served: Worldwide
- Key people: Shawn Peters, President and CEO; Robert (Bob) Antochow, CFO
- Revenue: ▲$214.5 million (2023)
- Net income: ▲$25 million (2023)
- Number of employees: 545 (2023)
- Subsidiaries: ESC Corporate Services Ltd; Enterprise Registry Solutions Limited; ISC Enterprise Inc; Reamined Systems Inc; Regulis
- Website: company.isc.ca/home/default.aspx

Information Services Corporation (ISC) is a publicly traded Canadian multinational company that provides registry and information management services for public data and records. The company focuses on the development and management of secure government registries. It operates through three business segments (Registry Operations, Services and Technology Solutions) and is a parent company to three subsidiaries: ISC Enterprise Inc, ESC Corporate Services Ltd, Enterprise Registry Solutions Ltd. Reamined Systems Inc. and Regulis.

== Activities ==
ISC holds a Master Service Agreement with the Government of Saskatchewan, which has been effective since 2013 and is valid until 2053. The agreement pertains to the Saskatchewan Land Registry, Personal Property Registry, Corporate Registry, Common Business Identifier Program, and Business Registration Saskatchewan Program.

In 2015, ISC acquired ESC Corporate Services Ltd.

In 2017, ISC acquired Enterprise Registry Solutions Ltd., an Ireland-based registry technology company.

In 2020, ISC acquired Paragon Inc., a technology enabled company focused on facilitating and coordinating asset recovery on behalf of many of Canada’s regulated banks.

In 2022, ISC acquired Reamined Systems Inc., a company providing property tax management infrastructure and services in Ontario.

In 2023, ISC acquired Regulis S.A, the Registrar that manages and operates the International Registry of Interests in Rolling Stock.

ISC currently employs approx. 545 people in Saskatchewan, Ontario, Quebec, British Columbia, and Ireland.

== Business Segments ==
=== Registry Operations ===
==== Land Registry ====
Management of records related to land ownership, including title registrations, transfers, mortgages, and other land related transactions. The Land Registry includes the Saskatchewan Land Titles Registry, Saskatchewan Land Surveys Directory and Saskatchewan Geomatics services.

==== Personal Property Registry ====
Track security interests in movable personal property (excluding land and buildings), such as vehicles, equipment, and other types of personal assets. ISC houses and maintains the Saskatchewan Personal Property Registry.

==== Corporate Registry ====
Maintain records of corporations, including information about incorporation, annual filings, legal status, directors, and shareholders. In 2010, ISC and the province of Saskatchewan collaborated to create a Corporate Registry. Records on all Saskatchewan businesses are maintained and made available to the public through the Corporate Registry.
