= Gran Tierra Energy =

Canadian energy company

Gran Tierra Energy Inc.
- Type: Public
- Traded as: TSX: GTE
- Industry: Oil and Gas Exploration and Production
- Founded: Calgary, Alberta, Canada (6 June 2005)
- Website: www.grantierra.com

Gran Tierra Energy is an energy company founded by Jeffrey Scott, Dana Coffield, Max Wei, Jim Hart and Rafael Orunesu in May 2005. The company, based in Calgary, Alberta, Canada, focuses on oil and gas exploration, development and production, particularly in South America. The company announced its intentions to merge with Solana Resources on 29 July 2008.

== History ==
In 2011, the company acquired Petrolifera Petroleum, a Canadian oil and gas company engaged in exploration and production activity in South America.
