= AutoCanada =

Multi-location automobile dealership group

AutoCanada Inc.
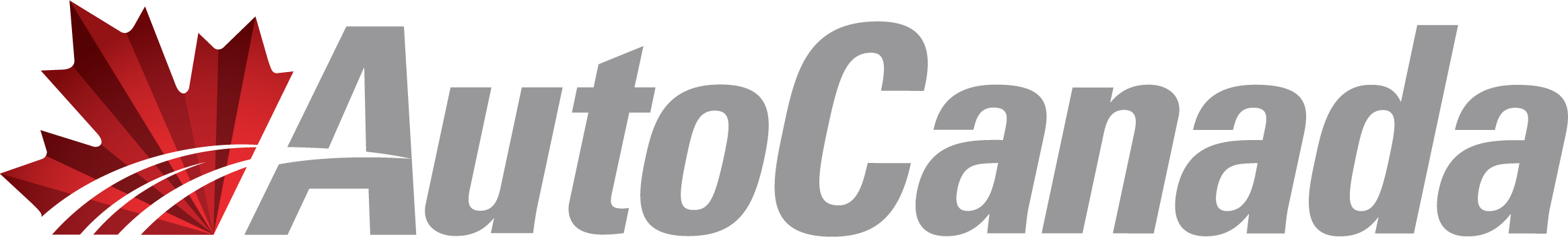
- Type: Public
- Traded as: TSX: ACQ
- Industry: Automotive, retail auto
- Founded: May 11, 2006; 20 years ago in Edmonton, Alberta, Canada
- Headquarters: Edmonton, Alberta, Canada
- Number of locations: 83 Franchised Dealerships, 3 used vehicle dealerships, 1 used vehicle auction business, 28 Collision Centers
- Areas served: Canada: British Columbia, Alberta, Saskatchewan, Manitoba, Ontario, New Brunswick, Québec, Nova Scotia United States: Illinois
- Key people: Sam Cochrane (Interim CEO & CFO); Mikel Pestrak (Interim President); Peter Hong (Chief Strategy Officer & General Counsel)
- Products: Automobile sales, leasing and parts
- Brands: Acura, Alfa Romeo, Audi, BMW, Buick, Cadillac, Chevrolet, Chrysler, Dodge, FIAT, Ford, GMC, Honda, Hyundai, Infiniti, Jeep, Kia, Lincoln, Mazda, Mercedes-Benz, MINI, Nissan, Porsche, Ram Trucks, Subaru, Toyota, Volkswagen, Volvo
- Website: www.autocan.ca

AutoCanada Inc. is a North American multi-location automobile dealership group currently operating 81 franchised dealerships, consisting of 27 brands in eight provinces in Canada as well as a group in Illinois, USA. AutoCanada currently sells Chrysler, Dodge, Jeep, Ram, FIAT, Alfa Romeo, Chevrolet, GMC, Buick, Cadillac, Ford, Infiniti, Nissan, Hyundai, Subaru, Audi, Volkswagen, Kia, Mazda, Mercedes-Benz, BMW, MINI, Toyota, Lincoln, Acura, Honda and Porsche branded vehicles. In addition, AutoCanada's Canadian Operations segment currently operates 3 used vehicle dealerships and 1 used vehicle auction business supporting the Used Digital Retail Division, and 12 stand-alone collision centres within its group of 29 collision centres. In 2024, the Company generated revenue in excess of $5.3 billion and our dealerships sold over 97,000 retail vehicles.

AutoCanada is a publicly traded company on the Toronto Stock Exchange, traded as TSX: ACQ and headquartered in Edmonton, Alberta.

== Management team ==
As of 2025, AutoCanada is managed by the following people:

- Samuel Cochrane (Interim Chief Executive Officer and Chief Financial Officer)
- Mikel Pestrak (Interim President)
- Peter Hong (Chief Strategy Officer & General Counsel)
