= C-4 Protective Mask =

Gas mask used by the Canadian military

The C4 CBRN Protective Mask is the current issued gas mask of the Canadian Armed Forces. The C4 is a negative-pressure, full-face respirator with an ergonomic butyl rubber face piece. With its stretch-fabric mesh head harness and two simple adjustment pull straps, the C4 respirator is easily donned and doffed.

The C-4 Protective Mask was to be replaced starting in 2019 with the AirBoss Low Burden Mask (LBM) as part of the Joint Chemical Biological Radiological Nuclear General Service Respirator (J CBRN GSR) contract.
