= Toronto Stock Exchange =

Stock exchange in Canada

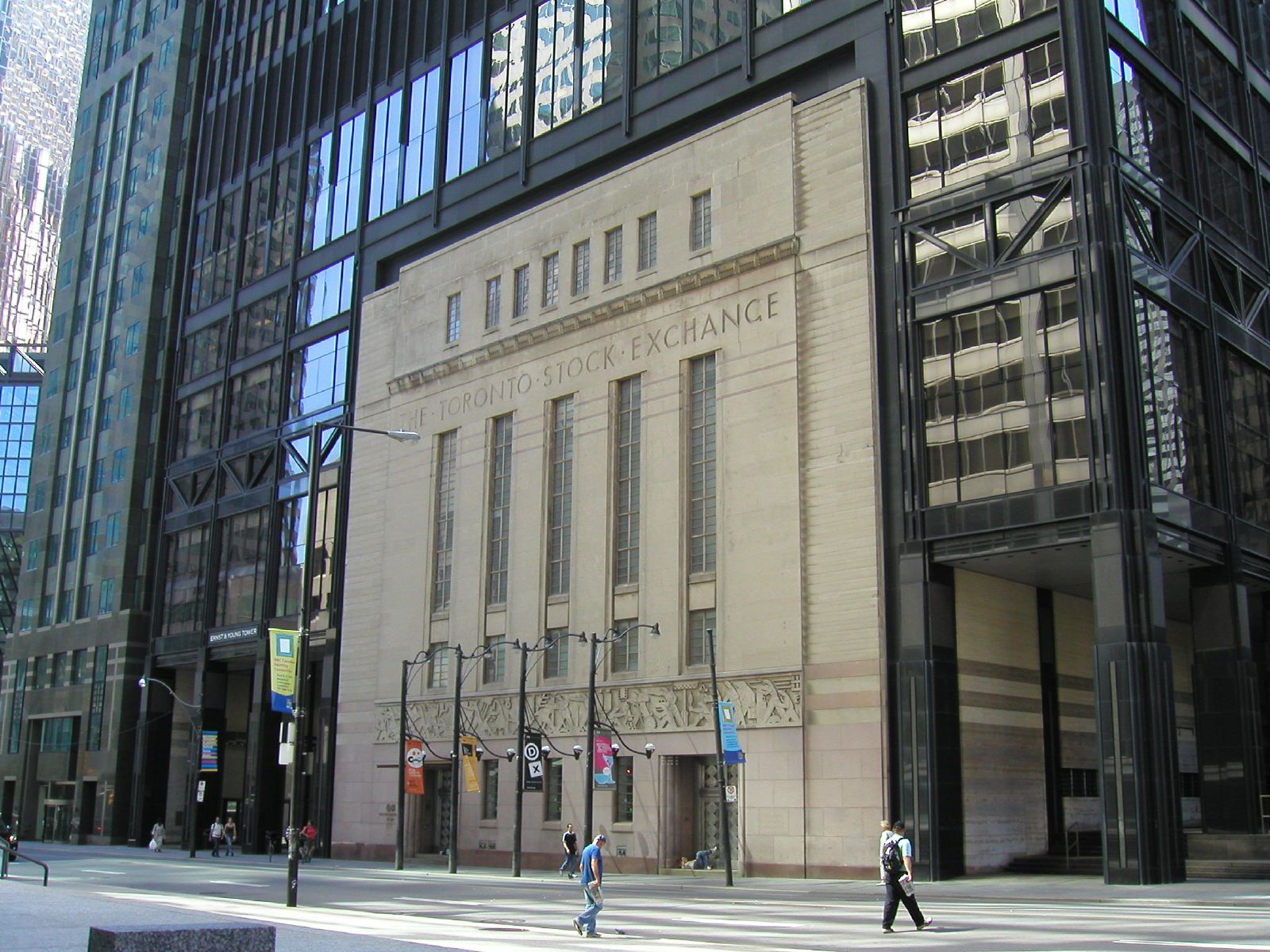
- Toronto Stock Exchange in 2006
- Type: Stock exchange
- Location: Toronto, Ontario, Canada
- Coordinates: 43°38′53.88″N 79°22′59.88″W
- Founded: 25 October 1861; 165 years ago
- Owner: TMX Group
- Key people: John McKenzie (CEO, TMX Group); Loui Anastasopoulos (CEO, Toronto Stock Exchange and Global Head, Capital Formation)
- Currency: Canadian dollar
- No. of listings: 3,476 (January 2024)
- Market cap: $2.92 trillion (January 2024)
- Indices: S&P/TSX Composite; S&P/TSX 60; S&P/TSX Completion Index
- Website: tsx.com

The Toronto Stock Exchange (TSX; French: Bourse de Toronto) is a stock exchange located in Toronto, Ontario, Canada. It is the 10th largest exchange in the world and the third largest in North America by market capitalization. Based in the EY Tower in Toronto's Financial District, the TSX is a wholly owned subsidiary of the TMX Group for the trading of senior equities.

== History ==
=== Beginnings ===
The Toronto Stock Exchange (known by the acronyms TSE until 2002 and TSX thereafter) likely descended from the Association of Brokers, a group formed by Toronto businessmen on July 26, 1852. No records of the group's transactions have survived. It is however known that on October 25, 1861, twenty-four brokers gathered at the Masonic Hall to create and participate in the Toronto Stock Exchange. Between 1852 and 1870, two other distinct, commodity-orientated, exchanges were founded : the Toronto Exchange in 1854 and the Toronto Stock and Mining Exchange in 1868. Initially the TSE had 13 listings but it grew to 18 in 1868 (a majority of bonds and bank's issues). Many banks of Upper Canada failed during 1869, which halted any sort of trading in the city as the market was just too small. A bull market in 1870 boosted investor's confidence and eight of the original 24 brokers joined again to re-establish the TSE. The exchange was incorporated by an act of the Legislative Assembly of Ontario in 1878.

The TSE grew continuously in size and in shares traded, save for a three-month period in 1914 when the exchange was shut down for fear of financial panic due to World War I. The day of the Wall Street crash of 1929, Toronto's exchange was better connected to New York's and received the bad news before Montreal's (prior to 1931, exchanges communicated via telephone or by brokers' private wires, as they were not yet interconnected by ticker). By the afternoon, its three most popular stocks were down by at least 8%: International Nickel, Hiram Walker & Sons and Brazilian Light & Power. The following day, a record number of 331,000 shares changed hands on the TSE, with an overall loss of value of 20% (in Montreal, 525,000 shares and 25% loss).

Meanwhile, a British Columbia gold rush in the 1890s stimulated the demand for start-up capital but Montreal and Toronto's exchanges deemed the ventures too risky. The boom was handled with the Toronto Industrial and Mining Exchange, founded in 1897, and the Standard Mining Exchange, which was founded in 1899. In 1900, the two exchanges merged and became the Standard Stock and Mining Exchange. The SSME, after years of ups and downs, was amalgamated into the Toronto Stock Exchange in 1934. While a durable surge in mining trading was recorded in Toronto (either securities) or other publicly listed assets, in Montreal the volume of the equity-centric market was going down. Toronto found itself a reputation as a financial centre for mining and from 1934, the total trading volume on the TSE surpassed that of Montreal's.

=== A major exchange ===
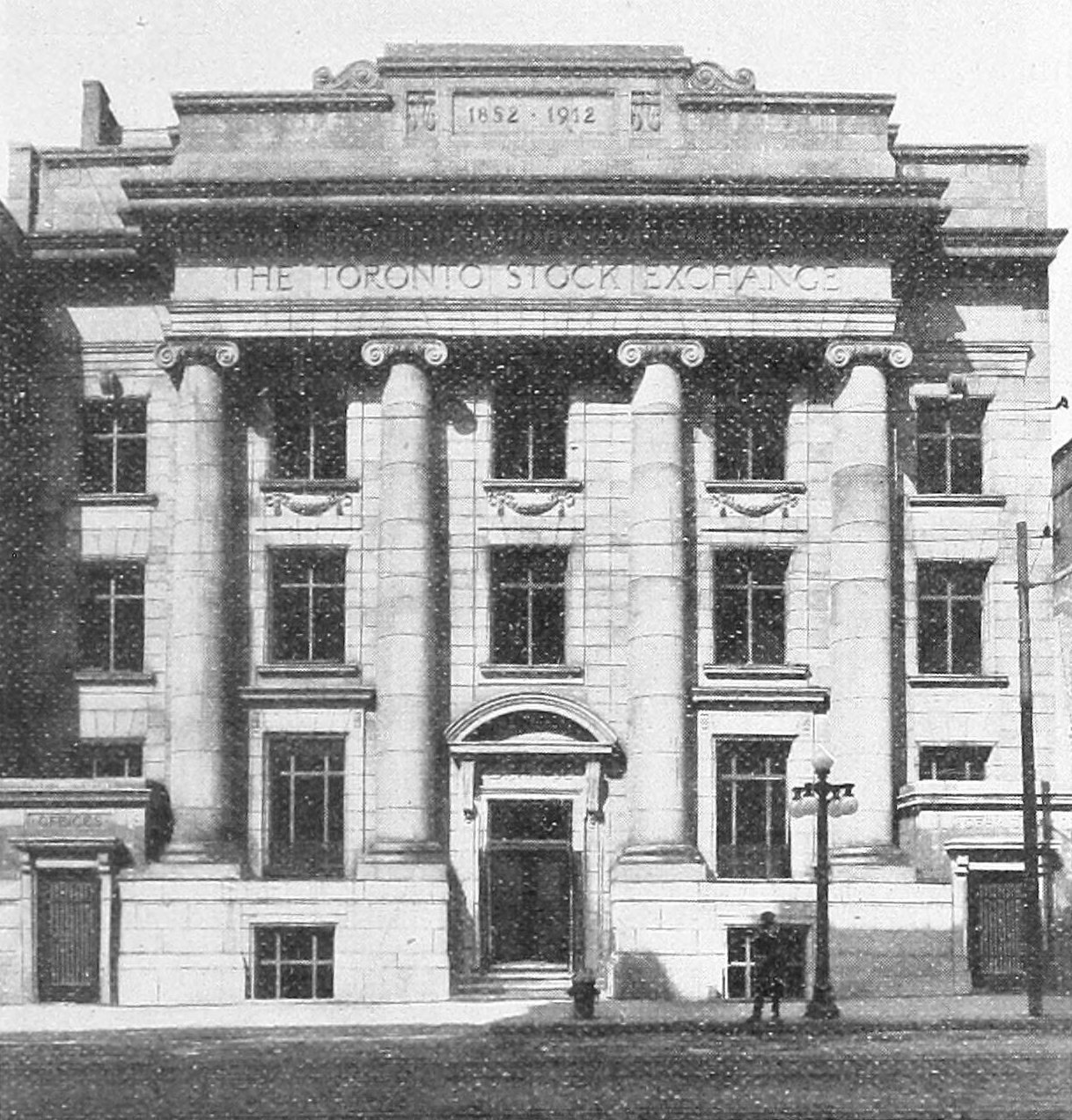
The 1912 Toronto Stock Exchange Building on Bay Street, designed by John M. Lyle

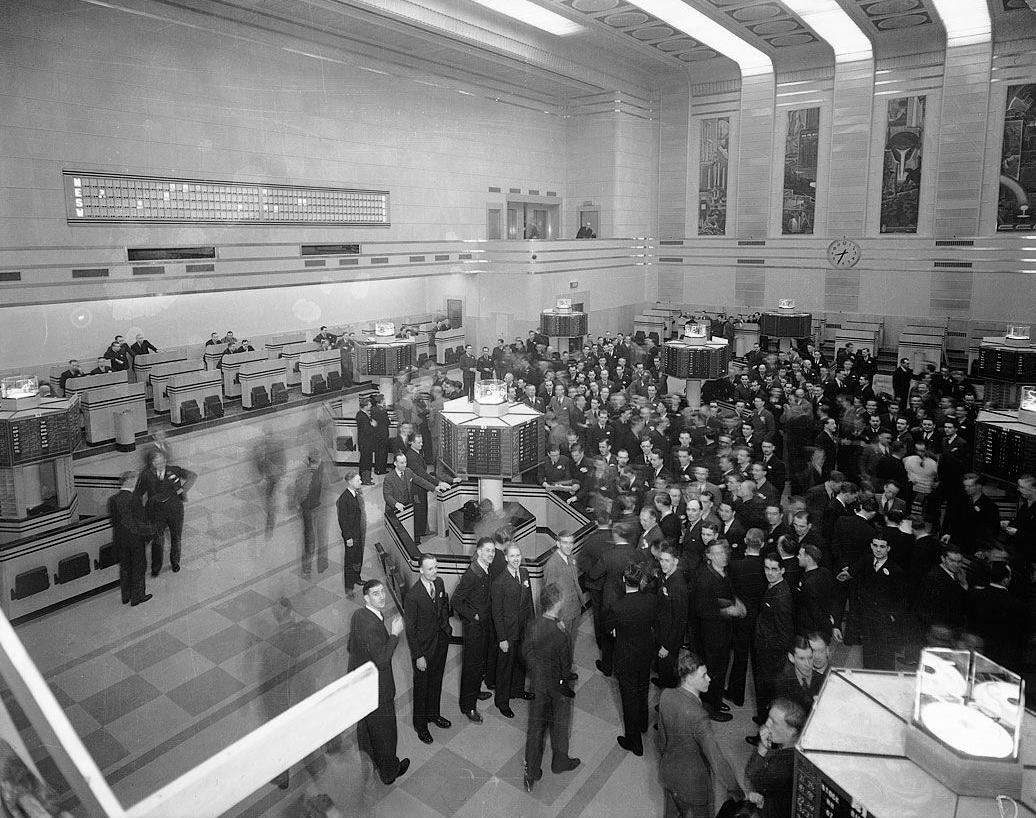
New Toronto Stock Exchange trading floor, c. 1937–39

The TSE moved on Bay Street in 1913 and in 1937 opened a new trading floor and headquarters in an Art Deco building, still on Bay. By 1936, the Toronto Stock Exchange grew to become the third largest in North America.

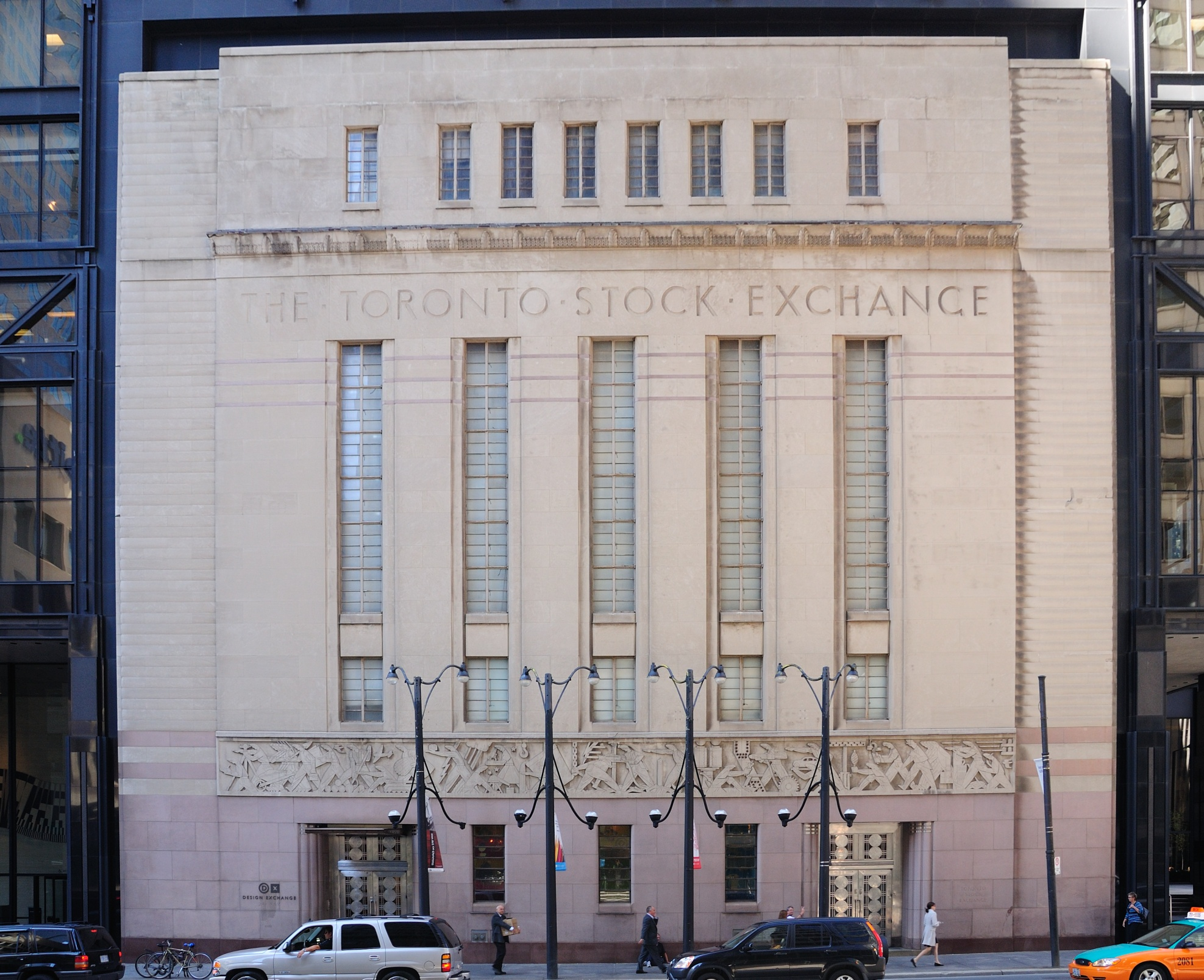
The 1936 exchange, designed by George & Moorhouse with Samuel H. Maw. The relief is by Charles Comfort.

In 1977, it launched the TSE 300 index and introduced the CATS (Computer Assisted Trading System), an automated trading system, and began to use it for the quotation of less liquid equities. In 1983, the TSE vacated its Art Deco headquarters on Bay Street and moved into the Exchange Tower. The old TSE building later became the Design Exchange, a museum and education centre. On April 23, 1997, the TSE's trading floor closed, making it the second-largest stock exchange in North America to choose a floorless, electronic (or virtual trading) environment.

In 1999, through a major realignment plan, the Toronto Stock Exchange became Canada's sole exchange for the trading of senior equities. The Bourse de Montréal/Montreal Exchange assumed responsibility for the trading of derivatives and the Vancouver Stock Exchange and Alberta Stock Exchange merged to form the Canadian Venture Exchange (CDNX) handling trading in junior equities. The Canadian Dealing Network, Winnipeg Stock Exchange, and equities portion of the Montreal Exchange later merged with CDNX. In 2000, the Toronto Stock Exchange became a for-profit company. In 2002, its acronym was changed to TSX and it became a public company.

=== TMX Group era ===
In 2001, the Toronto Stock Exchange acquired the Canadian Venture Exchange, which was renamed the TSX Venture Exchange in 2002; this resulted in the creation of a parent to the TSX, the TSX Group. This ended 123 years of the usage of TSE as a Canadian stock exchange. On May 11, 2007, the S&P/TSX Composite, the main index of the Toronto Stock Exchange, traded above the 14,000 point level for the first time ever. On December 17, 2008, for the first time, the TSX was closed for a full trading day due to a technical glitch.

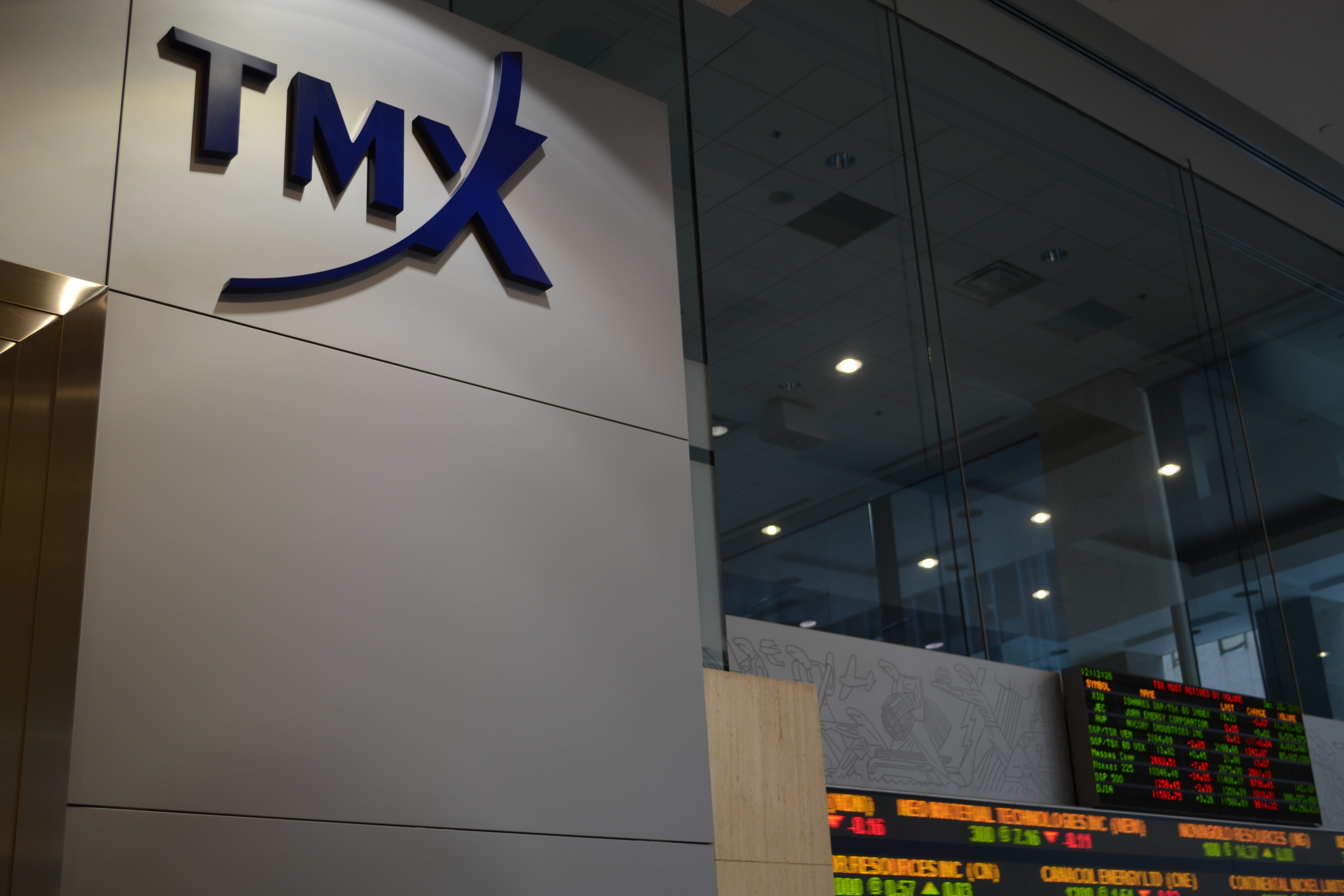
TMX offices at Exchange Tower. In 2001, the TSX Group was formed following TSE's acquisition of Canadian Venture Exchange.

On February 9, 2011, the London Stock Exchange announced that it had agreed to merge with the TMX Group, the Toronto Stock Exchange's parent, hoping to create a combined entity with a market capitalization of $5.9 trillion (£3.7 trillion). Xavier Rolet, who is CEO of the LSE Group, would have headed the new enlarged company, while TMX Chief Executive Thomas Kloet would become the new firm president. Based on data from December 30, 2010 the new stock exchange would have been the second largest in the world with a market cap 48% greater than the Nasdaq. Eight of the 15 board members of the combined entity were to be appointed by LSE, 7/15 by TMX. The provisional name for the combined group would be LTMX Group plc. About two weeks after Maple Group launched a competing bid the LSEG-TMX deal was terminated after failing to receive the minimum 67% voter approval from shareholders of TMX Group. The rejection came amidst new concerns raised by Bank of Canada governor Mark Carney regarding foreign control of clearing systems and opposition to the deal by Ontario's finance minister. On June 13, 2011, a rival and hostile bid from the Canadian-based Maple Group took place. The bid was for up to CAD$3.7 billion in cash and shares, in the hope of preventing a takeover of TMX by the LSEG Group. The group included leading Canadian banks and financial institutions. In March 2015, a competing exchange, Aequitas Neo, opened for trading, listing 45 issues that were only listed on the TSX. The new exchange aimed to focus on fairness, particularly in relation to what it referred to as "predatory high-frequency trading practices". The exchange planned to list additional TSX-listed securities. On May 27, 2014, TMX Group officially opened financial operations in Canada, the United States, the United Kingdom and Australia under the name TSX Financial.

== Operations ==
The exchange has a normal trading session from 09:30am to 04:00pm ET and a post-market session from 4:15pm to 5:00pm ET on all days of the week except Saturdays, Sundays and holidays declared by the Exchange in advance.

=== Companies listed ===
Toronto Stock Exchange listed stocks:

0–9 - A - B - C - D - E - F - G - H - I - J - K - L - M - N - O - P - Q - R - S - T - U - V - W - X - Y - Z

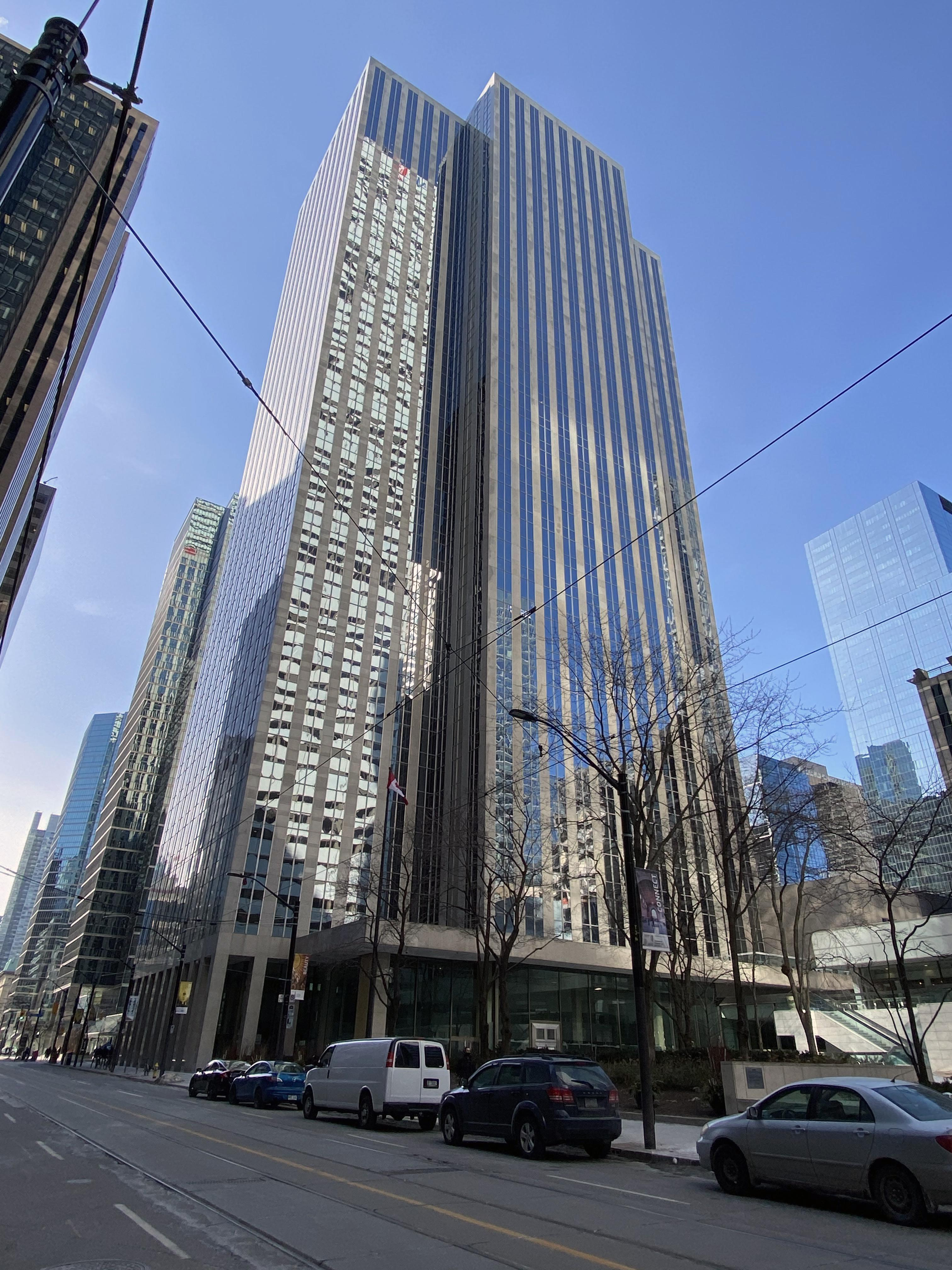
Exchange Tower on King Street West now houses a significant portion of TSX's functions.

As of January 2024, the Toronto Stock Exchange had 1,811 listed issuers (including ETFs and other structured financial products) with a combined market capitalization of CAD $4.16 trillion. Up from 1,798 listed issuers and a combined market capitalization of CAD $4.0 trillion as of March 2023. By the end of January 2024, the total market capitalization of companies listed on the TSX & TSXV reached CAD $4.23 trillion.

The exchange is home to all of Canada's Big Five commercial banks—Canadian Imperial Bank of Commerce (CIBC), Bank of Montreal (BMO), Bank of Nova Scotia (Scotiabank), Royal Bank of Canada (RBC), and the Toronto-Dominion Bank (TD)—making the exchange the centre for banking in the country. This was seen as being most evident during the proposed mergers of Royal Bank with Bank of Montreal, and CIBC with the Toronto-Dominion Bank in 1998. Then-Finance Minister Paul Martin blocked the mergers to preserve competition.

The exchange is the primary listing for a number of energy companies including; Enbridge, Suncor, TC Energy, Canadian Natural Resources, Imperial Oil, Pembina and Cenovus all within the S&P/TSX 60 index.

Many of the large companies listed on the TSX, especially those on the S&P/TSX 60 index, have a secondary listing on an American exchange such as the New York Stock Exchange. TSX listings of U.S.-listed companies can be listed by the NYSE/NASDAQ ticker symbol with the suffix ':CA' on the TSX; for example AAPL:CA.

== Leadership ==
=== President (to 1954) and Chairman of the Board of Governors (from 1954) ===
The president, and later chairman, was an elected executive from the board of governors. The president typically would serve one or two terms, though some early presidents served for several years. At the TSE's annual meeting in 1954, the title changed to chairman. The president or chairman was an unpaid, part-time position. Dates below indicate years of election.

- 1861, 1862 – Herbert Mortimer
- 1863 – William Alexander
- 1865 – John C. Stikeman
- 1866 – Edmund Bradburn
- 1867 – Herbert Mortimer
- 1868, 1869, 1870 – Humphrey Lloyd Hime
- 1871, 1872 – Sir Walter Gibson Pringle Cassels
- 1873, 1874, 1875 – James Browne
- 1876, 1877, 1878, 1879, 1880 – Henry Pellatt Sr.
- 1881 – William Hope
- 1882, 1883 – Robert Beaty
- 1884 – Harrison Reese Forbes
- 1885 – John Stark
- 1886 – William James Baines
- 1887 – Herbert Carlyle Hammond
- 1888, 1889 – Humphrey Lloyd Hime
- 1890, 1891 – Sir Walter Gibson Pringle Cassels
- 1892 – Sir Casimir Stanislaus Gzowski
- 1893, 1894 – John Stark
- 1895 – John William Beaty
- 1896, 1897 – Alfred Ernest Ames
- 1898, 1899 – George Tower Fergusson
- 1900, 1901 – James Lorne Campbell
- 1902, 1903 – Robert Alexander Smith
- 1904, 1905 – Robert Henry Temple
- 1906, 1907 – Augustus Perrine Burritt
- 1908, 1909 – James Oliver Buchanan
- 1910, 1911 – William Henry Brouse Jr.
- 1912, 1913 – Francis Gordon Osler
- 1914 – Edward Buchan Freeland
- 1915, 1916 – George Tower Fergusson
- 1917, 1918 – Hilton Russell Tudhope
- 1919 – George William Blaikie
- 1920, 1921 – Edwin Gordon Wills
- 1922, 1923 – John Campbell Fraser
- 1924 – Robert Cassels
- 1925 – George Gooderham Mitchell
- 1926, 1927 – Avern Pardoe
- 1928, 1929 – Charles Ernest Abbs
- 1930 – William Harold Mara
- 1931, 1932 – George Gooderham Mitchell
- 1933, 1934 – Harold Franks
- 1935 – Gordon Walter Nicholson
- 1936 – Harry Broughton Housser
- 1937 – Norman Currie Urquhart
- 1938 – Frank Gordon Lawson
- 1939 – Frederick Joseph Crawford
- 1940 – Gordon Ross Bongard
- 1941, 1942 – Thomas Alexander Richardson
- 1943, 1944 – Wilfrid Gardner Malcolm
- 1945, 1946 – James Butler White
- 1947, 1948 – Robert James Breckenridge
- 1949, 1950 – Andrew Lowry Alexander Richardson
- 1951, 1952 – D'Arcy Manning Doherty
- 1953 – George Leslie Jennison

At the 1954 annual meeting, title changes to Chairman of the Board of Governors

- 1954 – George Leslie Jennison
- 1955, 1956 – Gordon Stuart Osler
- 1957, 1958 – James Gowan Kirkpatrick Strathy
- 1959 – Charles Percival Lailey
- 1960, 1961 – Eric Duff Scott Sr.
- 1962, 1963 – George Ryerson Gardiner
- 1964, 1965 – Marshal Stearns
- 1966, 1967 – John Scott Deacon
- 1968, 1969 – Robert Newman Steiner
- 1970 – William Hamilton Alexander Thorburn
- 1971 – Donald Gordon Lawson
- 1972 – John Christopher Cassels Barron
- 1973 – John Pearce Bunting
- 1974 – Robert Trevor Morgan
- 1975 – Edgar Stuart Miles
- 1976 – Frederic York McCutcheon
- 1977 – William Richard Lilliott
- 1978 – Angus Michael Morrow Curry
- 1979 – Leighton Wilckes McCarthy
- 1980 – Hugh Keswick McMahon
- 1981, 1982 – Murray Joseph Howe
- 1983, 1984 – Charles Robert Younger
- 1985, 1986 – Donald Herman Page
- 1987, 1988 – Eric Duff Scott Jr.
- 1989, 1990 – Jean-Charles Caty
- 1991, 1992 – Kenneth Michael Edwards
- 1993, 1994 – Frederick Mansel Ketchen
- 1995, 1996 – John Churchill Clark
- 1997, 1998 – Barbara Gayle Stymiest
- 1999, 2000 – Daniel Francis Sullivan
- 2001, 2002 – Wayne Charles Fox

=== President ===
In 1956, the exchange created a new, full-time presidential role. In contrast to the chairman of the board of governors, the president was a paid position and was held by a non-member of the exchange.

1. Arthur John Trebilcock, 23 May 1956 – October 1958
2. Howard Douglas Graham, 1 January 1961 – 30 June 1966
3. John Robert Kimber, 1 May 1967 – 10 October 1976 †
4. John Pearce Bunting, 1 July 1977 – 31 December 1994
5. Rowland William Fleming, 1 January 1995 – April 1999
6. Barbara Gayle Stymiest, 12 October 1999 – 31 October 2004
7. Richard William Nesbitt, 2 December 2004 – 27 February 2008

† = died in office

== See also ==
- Stock market index
- System for Electronic Document Analysis and Retrieval (SEDAR)
- List of stock exchanges
- List of stock exchanges in the Americas
- List of stock exchange mergers in the Americas
- List of stock exchanges in the Commonwealth of Nations
- S&P/TSX 60
- Category:Lists of companies listed on the Toronto Stock Exchange
