= List of New York City Designated Landmarks in the Bronx =

The New York City Landmarks Preservation Commission (LPC), formed in 1965, is the New York City governmental commission that administers the city's Landmarks Preservation Law. Since its founding, it has designated over a thousand landmarks, classified into four categories: individual landmarks, interior landmarks, scenic landmarks, and historic districts.

The New York City borough of the Bronx contains numerous landmarks designated by the LPC, several interior landmarks and historic districts. The following is an incomplete list. Some of these are also National Historic Landmark (NHL) sites, and NHL status is noted where known.

== Historic districts ==
Landmark name	Image	Date designated	Location
Bertine Block Historic District		April 5, 1994	Mott Haven
Clay Avenue Historic District Wikidata Q34818236	Upload image	April 5, 1994	Fleetwood Concourse Village
Fieldston Historic District	Upload image	January 10, 2006	Fieldston
Longwood Historic District	Upload image	July 8, 1980; extension: February 8, 1983	Longwood
Manida Street Historic District	Upload image	June 23, 2020	Hunts Point
Morris Avenue Historic District	Upload image	July 15, 1986	Mount Hope
Morris High School Historic District		December 21, 1982	Morrisania
Mott Haven East Historic District		April 5, 1994	Mott Haven
Mott Haven Historic District	Upload image	July 29, 1969	Mott Haven
Perry Avenue Historic District	Upload image	December 15, 2009	Bedford Park
Riverdale Historic District	Upload image	October 16, 1990	Riverdale

== Individual landmarks ==
Landmark name	Image	Date designated	Location
175 Belden Street		July 28, 1981	City Island
1857 Anthony Avenue 40.8478°N 73.9038°W		July 15, 1986	Tremont
21 Tier Street 40.8481°N 73.79115°W		June 20, 2000	City Island
50th Police Precinct Station House (Former) (40th Police Precinct Station House)		July 15, 1986	Kingsbridge Heights
52nd Police Precinct Station House		June 18, 1974	Norwood
614 Courtlandt Avenue Building		February 10, 1987	Melrose
62nd Police Precinct Station House (41st Police Precinct Station House), 1086 Simpson Street		June 2, 1992	Longwood
Administration Building at East 180th Street (Former New York, Westchester & Boston Railroad, Administration Building)		May 11, 1976	Van Nest
Alderbrook House, 4715 Independence Avenue 40°53′44.5″N 73°54′44″W		December 14, 2010	Hudson Hill
Alumni House (Housing Office), East Fordham Road and 191st Street		February 3, 1981	Fordham University Rose Hill campus
American Bank Note Company Printing Plant		February 5, 2008	Hunts Point
American Female Guardian Society (Former) (Home of the Friendless Woody Crest Home), 936 Woodycrest Avenue 40°49′50″N 73°55′46″W		March 28, 2000	Highbridge
Andrew Freedman Home		June 2, 1992	Concourse
Anthony Campagna Estate, 640 West 249th Street 40°53′48″N 73°54′39″W		November 16, 1993	Hudson Hill
Baird (Astor Court), New York Zoological Park (Bronx Zoo)		June 20, 2000	Bronx Zoo
Bartow-Pell Mansion		February 15, 1966	Pelham Bay Park
Bedford Park Congregational Church 40°52′17″N 73°53′0″W		June 20, 2000	Bedford Park
Begrisch Hall at Bronx Community College		January 8, 2002	Bronx Community College
Samuel H. and Mary T. Booth House, 30 Centre Street		November 28, 2017	City Island
Bronx Borough Courthouse		July 28, 1981	Melrose
Bronx County Courthouse		July 13, 1976	Concourse
Bronx Grit Chamber		June 8, 1982	Port Morris
Bronx Post Office		September 14, 1976	Mott Haven
Christ Church		January 11, 1967	Riverdale
College of Mount St. Vincent Administration Building 40°54′49″N 73°54′32″W		February 8, 1979	Riverdale
The Conservatory (Palm House and Wings)		October 16, 1973	New York Botanical Garden
Cornelius Baker Hall of Philosophy		February 15, 1966	Bronx Community College
Crotona Play Center 40°50′24″N 73°53′54″W		June 26, 2007	Crotona Park
Dollar Savings Bank (Former), 2972 Third Avenue		January 12, 2010	The Hub
Dollar Savings Bank Building (Emigrant Savings Bank), 2516-2530 Grand Concourse 40°51′47.7″N 73°53′45.5″W		July 19, 1994	Fordham Manor
Edgehill Church of Spuyten Duyvil (United Church of Christ)		November 25, 1980	Spuyten Duyvil
Estey Piano Company Factory		May 16, 2006	Port Morris
Firehouse, Engine Company 41 40.84635°N 73.8668°W		June 12, 2012	Melrose
Firehouse, Engine Company 46, Hook and Ladder Company 17 40.844°N 73.90°W		February 12, 2013	Bathgate
Firehouses, Engine Company 73 and Hook and Ladder Company 42 40.8152°N 73.9037°W		February 12, 2013	Longwood
Firehouse, Engine Company 83, Hook and Ladder Company 29 40.8059°N 73.9157°W		June 12, 2012	Mott Haven
Firehouse, Hook and Ladder Company 17 (Engine Company 60), 341 East 143rd Street		June 20, 2000	Mott Haven
Fonthill Castle (College Library), College of Mount St. Vincent 40°54′48″N 73°54′35″W		March 15, 1966	Riverdale
Fort Schuyler		April 19, 1966	Throggs Neck
Gould Memorial Library		February 15, 1966	Bronx Community College
Greyston Conference Center (William E. Dodge House), 690 West 247th Street		October 13, 1970	Hudson Hill
Greyston (William E. and Sarah T. Hoadley Dodge Jr., Estate) Gatehouse, 4695 Independence Avenue 40°53′41.3″N 73°54′42.3″W		March 22, 2011	Riverdale
H.F. Spaulding House (Coachman's Residence)		July 28, 1981	Riverdale
Hadley House, 5122 Post Road		June 20, 2000	Fieldston
Haffen Building, Willis Avenue and 148th Street 40°48′55″N 73°55′7.5″W		June 22, 2010	The Hub
Hall of Fame		February 15, 1966	Bronx Community College
Hall of Languages		February 15, 1966	Bronx Community College
Herman Ridder Junior High School (Public School 98), 1619 Boston Road 40°50′10.8″N 73°53′26.5″W		December 11, 1990	Morrisania
High Bridge, Aqueduct, and Pedestrian Walk		November 10, 1970	Highbridge
High Pumping Station		July 28, 1981	Jerome Park
Kingsbridge Armory (Eighth Regiment Armory)		September 24, 1974	Jerome Park
Loew's Paradise Theater		April 15, 1997	Fordham
Lorillard Snuff Mill		April 19, 1966	New York Botanical Garden
Macomb's Dam Bridge (Central Bridge) and 155th Street Viaduct		January 14, 1992	Concourse, also listed in the Borough of Manhattan
Messiah Home for Children, 1777 Andrews Avenue and 177th Street		June 24, 1997	Morris Heights
New York Botanical Garden Museum (Library) Building, Fountain of Life, and Tulip Tree Allee		March 24, 2009	New York Botanical Garden
New York Public Library, Morrisania Branch (McKinley Square Branch), 610 East 169th Street 40°49′53″N 73°54′6″W		June 16, 1998	Morrisania
New York Public Library, Hunts Point Branch		April 14, 2009	Hunts Point
New York Public Library, Woodstock Branch, 761 East 160th Street 40°49′14″N 73°54′16.5″W		April 14, 2009	Woodstock
Noonan Plaza Apartments, 139 West 168th Street 40°50′19″N 73°55′32″W		June 22, 2010	Highbridge
Old West Farms Soldier Cemetery, 2103 Bryant Avenue and 180th Street 40°50′37″N 73°52′46″W		August 2, 1967	West Farms
Orchard Beach Bathhouse and Promenade		June 20, 2006	Pelham Bay Park
Park Plaza Apartments		May 12, 1981	Highbridge
Poe Cottage		February 15, 1966	Fordham
Public School 15		January 10, 1978	Eastchester
Public School 27, St Ann's Avenue		September 19, 1995	Mott Haven
Public School 31, 425 Grand Concourse		July 15, 1986	Mott Haven
Public School 91		August 25, 1981	Highbridge
Rainey Memorial Gates		January 11, 1967	Bronx Zoo
Riverdale Presbyterian Church		April 19, 1966	Riverdale
Robert Colgate House ("Stonehurst") (Nicholas Katzenbach House)		October 13, 1970	Hudson Hill
Rockefeller Fountain (Bronx Zoo)		February 20, 1968	Bronx Zoo
Rose Hill (Fordham University Administration Building)		August 18, 1970	Fordham University Rose Hill campus
St. Ann's Church and Graveyard		June 9, 1967	Mott Haven
St. James' Episcopal Church		November 25, 1980	Fordham
St. John's Church, 3021 Kingsbridge Avenue		February 19, 1974	Kingsbridge
St. John's Residence Hall, Fordham Road and East 179th Street		August 18, 1970	Fordham University Rose Hill campus
St. Peter's Church, Chapel, and Cemetery, 2500 Westchester Avenue 40°50′19″N 73°50′38″W		March 23, 1976	Westchester Square
Samuel Pell House, 586 City Island Avenue 40°52′15.4″N 73°47′24.6″W		October 29, 2002	City Island
William H. Schofield House, 65 Schofield Street 40.845°N 73.7875°W		April 12, 2012	City Island
Second Battery Armory 1122 Franklin Avenue 40°49′41″N 73°54′20″W		June 2, 1992	Morrisania
Captain John H. Stafford House (Stafford "Osborn" House) 95 Pell Place 40°50′33″N 73°47′8″W		November 28, 2017	City Island
Sunnyslope (Bright Temple A.M.E. Church)		July 28, 1981	Hunts Point
Tremont Baptist Church, 324 East Tremont Avenue		February 8, 2000	Tremont
Union Reformed Church of Highbridge (Highbridge Community Church), 1272 Ogden Avenue 40°50′22″N 73°55′31″W		November 16, 2010	Highbridge
United Workers' Cooperative Colony ("The Coops") 40°51′57″N 73°52′11″W		June 2, 1992	Allerton
University Heights Bridge		September 11, 1984	University Heights
Van Cortlandt Mansion		March 15, 1966	Van Cortlandt Park
Van Schaick Free Reading Room/Huntington Free Library and Reading Room		April 5, 1994	Westchester Square
Varian House		March 15, 1966	Norwood
Washington Bridge		September 14, 1982	Morris Heights
Wave Hill House		June 21, 1966	Riverdale
West Farms Soldiers Cemetery		August 2, 1967	West Farms
Williamsbridge Reservoir Keeper's House, 3400 Reservoir Oval 40°52′44.5″N 73°52′32.7″W		February 8, 2000	Norwood

== Interior landmarks ==
Landmark name	Image	Date designated
Bartow-Pell Mansion Museum Interior		May 27, 1975
Bronx General Post Office Lobby, First Floor Interior		December 17, 2013
Crotona Play Center Bath House Interior, Main Floor Interior		June 26, 2007
Dollar Savings Bank (Emigrant Savings Bank), First Floor Interior 40.86312°N 73.89618°W		July 19, 1994
Gould Memorial Library, Bronx Community College, City University of New York, Ground Floor Interior		August 11, 1981
Loew's Paradise Theater Interior		May 16, 2006
Morris High School, Ground Floor Interior (Duncan Hall)		December 21, 1982
Van Cortlandt Mansion Interior		July 22, 1975

== Scenic landmarks ==
Scenic landmarks
Landmark name	Image	Date listed (Note: The number below each date is the number assigned to each location by the Landmarks Preservation Commission. The landmark designation report can be viewed by clicking the number.) (Note: For an interactive map, refer to "Discover New York City Landmarks". New York City Landmarks Preservation Commission – via ArcGIS.)	Location	Neighborhood	Description
Old Croton Aqueduct Walk	Old Croton Aqueduct Walk	April 16, 2024 (#2673)	Running from 179th Street to Kingsbridge Road; 40°51′45″N 73°54′15″W	Morris Heights, University Heights	A 4.9-mile (7.9 km) linear park along the route of the Old Croton Aqueduct, operating as a park since 1930.

== See also ==
- Lists of New York City Landmarks
- National Register of Historic Places listings in Bronx County, New York
