= National Register of Historic Places listings in the Bronx =

Location of Bronx County in New York

List of Registered Historic Places in Bronx County, New York (Borough of The Bronx):

This is intended to be a complete list of the 86 properties and districts listed on the National Register of Historic Places in Bronx County, New York. The locations of National Register properties and districts (at least for all showing latitude and longitude coordinates below) may be seen in a map by clicking on "Map of all coordinates". Seven of the properties and districts are further designated National Historic Landmarks.

This National Park Service list is complete through NPS recent listings posted September 11, 2026.

Contents: Counties in New York
Albany (Albany) – Allegany – Bronx – Broome – Cattaraugus – Cayuga – Chautauqua – Chemung – Chenango – Clinton – Columbia – Cortland – Delaware – Dutchess (Poughkeepsie, Rhinebeck) – Erie (Buffalo) – Essex – Franklin – Fulton – Genesee – Greene – Hamilton – Herkimer – Jefferson – Kings – Lewis – Livingston – Madison – Monroe (Rochester) – Montgomery – Nassau – New York (Below 14th Street, 14th to 59th Streets, 59th to 110th Streets, Above 110th Street, Islands) – Niagara (Niagara Falls) – Oneida – Onondaga (Syracuse) – Ontario – Orange – Orleans – Oswego – Otsego – Putnam – Queens – Rensselaer – Richmond – Rockland – St. Lawrence – Saratoga – Schenectady – Schoharie – Schuyler – Seneca – Steuben – Suffolk – Sullivan – Tioga – Tompkins – Ulster – Warren – Washington – Wayne – Westchester (Northern, Southern, New Rochelle, Peekskill, Yonkers) – Wyoming – Yates

== Current listings ==
	Name on the Register	Image	Date listed	Location	City or town	Description
1	242nd Street – Van Cortlandt Park Station (IRT)	242nd Street – Van Cortlandt Park Station (IRT)	March 30, 2005 (#05000226)	Above Broadway at the junction of West 242nd Street; 40°53′20″N 73°53′56″W	Riverdale	Subway station (1 train); Only remaining terminal elevated subway station in Victorian Gothic architectural style. Also has only remaining scrolled station sign in entire system
2	48th Police Precinct Station	48th Police Precinct Station	May 6, 1983 (#83001639)	1925 Bathgate Avenue; 40°50′49″N 73°53′52″W	Tremont	
3	52nd Police Precinct Station House and Stable	52nd Police Precinct Station House and Stable	October 29, 1982 (#82001091)	3016 Webster Avenue; 40°52′09″N 73°52′46″W	Norwood	
4	Bailey Avenue–West 193rd Street Houses		March 16, 2026 (#100012813)	2660 Bailey Avenue; 40°52′13″N 73°54′25″W		
5	Bartow-Pell Mansion and Carriage House	Bartow-Pell Mansion and Carriage House	December 30, 1974 (#74001220)	Pelham Bay Park, Shore Road; 40°52′18″N 73°48′21″W	Pelham Bay Park	
6	Boston Road Plaza		August 26, 2024 (#100010703)	2440 Boston Road; 40°51′44″N 73°51′58″W	Allerton	
7	Boston-Secor Houses		August 26, 2024 (#100010705)	3475, 3550, 3555 Bivona Street, 2175-2185 Reed's Mill Lane; 40°52′57″N 73°49′59″W	Eastchester	
8	Bronx Borough Courthouse	Bronx Borough Courthouse	February 25, 1982 (#82003344)	East 161st Street, 3rd and Brook Avenues; 40°49′22″N 73°54′38″W	Melrose	
9	Bronx Central Annex-U.S. Post Office	Bronx Central Annex-U.S. Post Office	May 6, 1980 (#80002584)	558 Grand Concourse; 40°49′08″N 73°55′37″W	Mott Haven	
10	Bronx County Courthouse	Bronx County Courthouse	September 8, 1983 (#83001636)	851 Grand Concourse; 40°49′34″N 73°55′27″W	Concourse	
11	Casa Amadeo, antigua Casa Hernandez	Casa Amadeo, antigua Casa Hernandez	March 23, 2001 (#01000244)	786 Prospect Avenue; 40°49′09″N 73°54′08″W	Longwood	
12	Casita Rincón Criollo		June 27, 2024 (#100009280)	749-753 Brook Avenue; 40°49′14″N 73°54′43″W	Melrose	
13	Chevra Linas Hazedek Synagogue of Harlem and the Bronx	Chevra Linas Hazedek Synagogue of Harlem and the Bronx	November 19, 2014 (#14000934)	1115 Ward Avenue; 40°49′36″N 73°52′37″W	Soundview	Remaining synagogue from early Jewish settlement of neighborhood
14	Christ Church Complex	Christ Church Complex	September 8, 1983 (#83001637)	5030 Riverdale Avenue; 40°53′56″N 73°54′25″W	Riverdale	
15	Robert Colgate House	Robert Colgate House	September 8, 1983 (#83001638)	5225 Sycamore Avenue; 40°54′07″N 73°54′45″W	Hudson Hill	
16	Concourse Yard Entry Buildings	Concourse Yard Entry Buildings	February 9, 2006 (#06000014)	West 205th Street, between Jerome and Paul Avenues; 40°52′34″N 73°53′21″W	Jerome Park	
17	Concourse Yard Substation	Concourse Yard Substation	February 9, 2006 (#06000013)	3119 Jerome Avenue; 40°52′30″N 73°53′22″W	Jerome Park	
18	Croton Aqueduct (Old)	Croton Aqueduct (Old)	April 27, 1992 (#74001324)	Croton River, Westchester, to Highbridge Park, Manhattan; 41°13′35″N 73°51′19″W	Westchester County; Riverdale, Van Cortlandt Park, Kingsbridge, and University Heights in the Bronx; Washington Heights, Manhattan	Large and complex water supply system for New York City; constructed between 1837 and 1842
19	Crotona Play Center	Crotona Play Center	April 28, 2015 (#15000177)	1700 Fulton Avenue; 40°50′23″N 73°53′53″W	Crotona Park	Only WPA-built swimming pool complex in the Bronx
20	William E. Dodge House	William E. Dodge House	August 28, 1977 (#77000934)	690 West 247th Street; 40°53′42″N 73°54′56″W	Riverdale	
21	Dollar Savings Bank	Dollar Savings Bank	April 27, 2011 (#11000228)	2792 3rd Avenue; 40°48′54″N 73°55′08″W	The Hub	
22	Dollar Savings Bank	Dollar Savings Bank	November 18, 2024 (#100010987)	2516-2530 Grand Concourse; 40°51′47″N 73°53′46″W	Fordham	
23	Joseph Rodman Drake Park and Enslaved People's Burial Ground		February 3, 2025 (#100011418)	Oak Point Avenue, Drake Park South, Longfellow Avenue, and Hunts Point Avenue; 40°48′37″N 73°52′58″W	Hunts Point	
24	East 152nd Street–Courtlandt Avenue Houses		January 2, 2026 (#100012488)	372 East 152nd Street and 370 East 153rd Street; 40°49′06″N 73°55′04″W		
25	East 180th Street–Monterey Avenue Houses		March 16, 2025 (#100012814)	East 180th to 181st Street and Monterey to Lafontaine Avenues; 40°51′02″N 73°53′33″W		
26	Eastchester Houses		February 6, 2025 (#100011441)	Generally, Burke Avenue, Bouck Avenue, Adee Avenue, Yates Avenue; 40°52′04″N 73°51′10″W	Laconia	
27	Edenwald Houses	Edenwald Houses	June 17, 2024 (#100010433)	Generally bounded by Grenada Place, Baychester Avenue, East 225th Street, Laconia Avenue, and Schieffelin Avenue; 40°53′16″N 73°50′41″W	Edenwald	
28	Edgehill Church at Spuyten Duyvil	Edgehill Church at Spuyten Duyvil	October 29, 1982 (#82001089)	2550 Independence Avenue; 40°52′48″N 73°55′13″W	Spuyten Duyvil	
29	Eighth Regiment Armory	Eighth Regiment Armory	December 21, 1982 (#82001090)	29 West Kingsbridge Road; 40°52′07″N 73°53′55″W	Jerome Park	Eighth Regiment Armory is commonly known as Kingsbridge Armory. Romanesque structure with five-acre (2 ha) footprint built in 1910s is believed to be the world's largest armory.
30	Admiral David Glasgow Farragut Gravesite	Admiral David Glasgow Farragut Gravesite	October 16, 2012 (#12001008)	Lot 1429–44, Section 14, Aurora Hill Plot, Woodlawn Cemetery; 40°53′24″N 73°52′27″W	Woodlawn	
31	Fonthill Castle and the Administration Building of the College of Mount St. Vincent	Fonthill Castle and the Administration Building of the College of Mount St. Vincent	July 11, 1980 (#80002585)	West 261st Street and Riverdale Avenue; 40°54′49″N 73°54′34″W	Riverdale	
32	Fort Independence Historic District	Fort Independence Historic District	August 23, 2016 (#16000551)	Cannon Place, Orloff and Sedgwick Avenues, and Giles Place; 40°52′52″N 73°53′50″W	Kingsbridge	Hill where Revolutionary War fort was sited retains unusual street plan designed around topography by Frederick Law Olmsted in 1877
33	Fort Independence Street–Heath Avenue Houses		March 16, 2025 (#100012815)	3340 Bailey Avenue and 3353 Fort Independence Street; 40°52′47″N 73°54′01″W		
34	Fort Schuyler	Fort Schuyler	June 29, 1976 (#76001206)	Throggs Neck at East River and Long Island Sound; 40°48′20″N 73°47′34″W	Throggs Neck	
35	Grace Episcopal Church	Grace Episcopal Church	September 13, 2006 (#06000820)	116 City Island Avenue; 40°50′27″N 73°47′04″W	City Island	
36	Grand Concourse Historic District	Grand Concourse Historic District	August 24, 1987 (#87001388)	730–1675 Grand Concourse; 40°49′52″N 73°55′26″W	Concourse	
37	Hall of Fame Complex	Hall of Fame Complex	September 7, 1979 (#79001567)	Bronx Community College campus 40°51′31″N 73°54′52″W	University Heights	
38	Hertlein and Schlatter Silk Trimmings Factory	Hertlein and Schlatter Silk Trimmings Factory	February 5, 2001 (#00001683)	454–464 East 148th Street; 40°48′51″N 73°54′59″W	Mott Haven	
39	High Pumping Station	High Pumping Station	November 10, 1983 (#83003882)	Jerome Avenue; 40°52′42″N 73°53′12″W	Jerome Park	
40	House at 175 Belden Street	House at 175 Belden Street	June 3, 1982 (#82003345)	175 Belden Street; 40°50′17″N 73°46′57″W	City Island	
41	Hunts Point Rail Station	Hunts Point Rail Station	May 9, 2022 (#100007684)	904–918 Hunts Point Avenue; 40°49′11″N 73°53′24″W	Hunts Point	
42	Jackson Avenue Subway Station (IRT)	Jackson Avenue Subway Station (IRT)	September 17, 2004 (#04001025)	Junction of East 152nd Street and Jackson and Westchester Avenues; 40°49′00″N 73°54′29″W	Melrose	Subway station (2 and 5 trains)
43	Jerome Park Reservoir	Jerome Park Reservoir	September 7, 2000 (#00001014)	Goulden, Reservoir and Sedgwick Avenues; 40°52′40″N 73°53′44″W	Jerome Park	
44	Keeper's House at Williamsbridge Reservoir	Keeper's House at Williamsbridge Reservoir	September 24, 1999 (#99001131)	3400 Reservoir Oval; 40°52′43″N 73°52′34″W	Norwood	
45	Lisanti Chapel	Lisanti Chapel	January 11, 2002 (#01001447)	740 East 215th Street; 40°52′48″N 73°51′48″W	Baychester	
46	Longwood Historic District	Longwood Historic District	September 26, 1983 (#83001640)	Roughly bounded by Beck Street, Longwood, Leggett, and Prospect Avenues; 40°49′00″N 73°54′00″W	Longwood	
47	Lorillard Snuff Mill	Lorillard Snuff Mill	December 22, 1977 (#77000935)	Bronx Botanical Garden; 40°51′36″N 73°52′35″W	Bronx Park	
48	Middletown Plaza		August 26, 2024 (#100010704)	3033 Middletown Road; 40°50′40″N 73°49′44″W	Pelham Bay	
49	E. Robert Moore Houses		September 2, 2025 (#100012184)	674 and 694 East 149th Street, 535 and 525 Jackson Avenue; 40°48′48″N 73°54′36″W		
50	Morris High School Historic District	Morris High School Historic District	September 15, 1983 (#83001641)	Roughly bounded by Boston Road, Jackson and Forrest Avenues, and East 166th and Home Streets; 40°49′38″N 73°54′15″W	Morrisania	
51	Morris Park Station	Morris Park Station	July 6, 2005 (#05000677)	Under Espalanade at Bogart and Colden Avenue and Hone Avenue; 40°51′17″N 73°51′37″W	Morris Park	Subway station (5 train), and former New York, Westchester and Boston Railway station
52	Mott Avenue Control House	Mott Avenue Control House	May 6, 1980 (#80002590)	149th Street and Grand Concourse; 40°49′07″N 73°55′39″W	Mott Haven	Subway control house for 2, 4, and 5 trains
53	Mott Haven Health Center		January 2, 2026 (#100012487)	349 East 140th Street; 40°48′40″N 73°55′25″W	Mott Haven	
54	Mott Haven Historic District	Mott Haven Historic District	March 25, 1980 (#80002586)	An irregular pattern along Alexander Avenue and East 140th Street; 40°48′37″N 73°55′32″W	Mott Haven	
55	New York Botanical Garden	New York Botanical Garden	May 28, 1967 (#67000009)	Southern and Bedford Park Blvds. 40°51′49″N 73°52′34″W	Bronx Park	
56	New York, Westchester and Boston Railroad Administration Building	New York, Westchester and Boston Railroad Administration Building	April 23, 1980 (#80002587)	481 Morris Park Avenue; 40°50′29″N 73°52′23″W	Van Nest	
57	Park Plaza Apartments	Park Plaza Apartments	June 3, 1982 (#82003346)	1005 Jerome Avenue; 40°49′50″N 73°55′30″W	Concourse	
58	Pelham Parkway Station (Dual System IRT)	Pelham Parkway Station (Dual System IRT)	March 30, 2005 (#05000228)	Junction of White Plains Road and Pelham Parkway; 40°51′26″N 73°52′03″W	Pelham Parkway	Subway station (2 and 5 trains)
59	Poe Cottage	Poe Cottage	August 19, 1980 (#80002588)	2640 Grand Concourse; 40°51′55″N 73°53′40″W	Fordham	
60	Port Morris Ferry Bridges	Port Morris Ferry Bridges	February 5, 2014 (#13001150)	106 Locust Avenue; 40°47′58″N 73°54′29″W	Port Morris	
61	Prospect Avenue Subway Station (IRT)	Prospect Avenue Subway Station (IRT)	September 17, 2004 (#04001026)	Junction of Westchester and Lonwood Avenues and Prospect Street; 40°49′11″N 73°54′08″W	Melrose and Longwood	Subway station (2 and 5 trains)
62	Public School 11	Public School 11	September 8, 1983 (#83001642)	1257 Ogden Avenue; 40°50′23″N 73°55′35″W	Highbridge	
63	Public School 15	Public School 15	December 10, 1981 (#81000401)	4010 Dyre Avenue; 40°53′27″N 73°49′52″W	Eastchester	
64	Public School 17	Public School 17	September 27, 1984 (#84002065)	190 Fordham Street; 40°50′49″N 73°47′05″W	City Island	
65	Rainey Memorial Gates	Rainey Memorial Gates	March 16, 1972 (#72000823)	New York Zoological Park; 40°51′18″N 73°52′40″W	Bronx Park	Paul Manship, Sculptor; Charles A Platt, architect
66	Reformed Church of Melrose	Reformed Church of Melrose	May 15, 2017 (#100000994)	746 Elton Avenue; 40°49′14″N 73°54′49″W	The Bronx	
67	C. Rieger's Sons Factory	C. Rieger's Sons Factory	May 27, 2004 (#04000543)	450–452 East 148th Street; 40°48′51″N 73°55′01″W	Mott Haven	
68	Riverdale–Spuyten Duyvil–Kingsbridge Memorial Bell Tower	Riverdale–Spuyten Duyvil–Kingsbridge Memorial Bell Tower	January 3, 2012 (#11000967)	Riverdale Avenue at West 239th Street & Henry Hudson Parkway; 40°53′21″N 73°54′30″W	Riverdale	
69	Riverdale Presbyterian Church Complex	Riverdale Presbyterian Church Complex	October 14, 1982 (#82001092)	4761–4765 Henry Hudson Parkway; 40°53′45″N 73°54′32″W	Riverdale	
70	St. Ann's Church Complex	St. Ann's Church Complex	April 16, 1980 (#80002589)	295 St. Ann's Avenue; 40°48′30″N 73°55′03″W	Mott Haven	
71	St. Anselm's Roman Catholic Church and School	St. Anselm's Roman Catholic Church and School	February 5, 2014 (#13001151)	683 Tinton Avenue; 40°48′58″N 73°54′20″W	Mott Haven	
72	St. James' Episcopal Church and Parish House	St. James' Episcopal Church and Parish House	September 30, 1982 (#82003347)	2500 Jerome Avenue; 40°51′50″N 73°54′00″W	Fordham	
73	St. Peter's Church, Chapel and Cemetery Complex	St. Peter's Church, Chapel and Cemetery Complex	September 26, 1983 (#83001643)	2500 Westchester Avenue; 40°50′17″N 73°50′41″W	Westchester Square	
74	St. Stephen's Methodist Church	St. Stephen's Methodist Church	February 8, 2012 (#12000008)	146 West 228th Street; 40°52′37″N 73°54′33″W	Marble Hill, Manhattan	
75	St. Stephen's Mission Church Complex		July 29, 2021 (#100006758)	4331 Vireo Avenue, 435 and 439 East 238th Street; 40°54′01″N 73°51′48″W	Woodlawn	
76	V. Santini, Inc. Warehouse		October 29, 2020 (#100005700)	2314–2316 Jerome Avenue; 40°51′33″N 73°54′12″W	Fordham	
77	Saxe Embroidery Company Building	Saxe Embroidery Company Building	February 22, 2018 (#100002072)	511–513 East 164th Street; 40°49′33″N 73°54′31″W	Morrisania	1904 factory is only architect-designed textile manufacturing facility in the Bronx; has housed a number of different industrial concerns over the years
78	Simpson Street Subway Station and Substation #18 (IRT)	Simpson Street Subway Station and Substation #18 (IRT)	September 17, 2004 (#04001027)	Junction of Westchester Avenue, between Simpson Street and Southern Boulevard; 40°49′27″N 73°53′37″W	Longwood	Subway station (2 and 5 trains) and Substation #18
79	Henry F. Spaulding Coachman's House	Henry F. Spaulding Coachman's House	November 4, 1982 (#82001093)	4970 Independence Avenue; 40°53′53″N 73°54′41″W	Riverdale	
80	Sunnyslope	Sunnyslope	September 15, 1983 (#83001644)	812 Faile Street; 40°49′02″N 73°53′14″W	Hunts Point	
81	Tremont Baptist Church	Tremont Baptist Church	October 16, 2009 (#09000831)	324 East Tremont Avenue; 40°50′54″N 73°54′08″W	Tremont	
82	United Workers Cooperatives	United Workers Cooperatives	September 11, 1986 (#86002518)	2700–2870 Bronx Park East; 40°51′59″N 73°52′11″W	Bronx Park	
83	US Post Office-Morrisania	US Post Office-Morrisania	November 17, 1988 (#88002458)	442 East 167th Street; 40°49′47″N 73°54′34″W	Morrisania	
84	University Heights Campus (Bronx Community College of The City University of New York)	University Heights Campus (Bronx Community College of The City University of New York)	October 16, 2012 (#12001013)	West 181st Street and University Avenue; 40°51′29″N 73°54′45″W	University Heights	
85	Valentine-Varian House	Valentine-Varian House	March 21, 1978 (#78001841)	3266 Bainbridge Avenue; 40°52′38″N 73°52′47″W	Norwood	
86	Frederick Van Cortlandt House	Frederick Van Cortlandt House	December 24, 1967 (#67000010)	Van Cortlandt Park at 242nd Street; 40°53′40″N 73°53′35″W	Van Cortlandt Park	
87	Washington Bridge	Washington Bridge	September 22, 1983 (#83001645)	Between Amsterdam and Undercliff Avenues; 40°50′42″N 73°55′29″W	Morris Heights	Bridge from Harlem to the Bronx
88	Wave Hill	Wave Hill	September 9, 1983 (#83001646)	675 West 252nd Street; 40°53′55″N 73°54′47″W	Riverdale	
89	Westchester Square Station (Dual System IRT)	Westchester Square Station (Dual System IRT)	March 30, 2005 (#05000227)	Above Westchester Avenue, from Overing Street to Ferris Place; 40°50′23″N 73°50′38″W	Westchester Square	Subway station (6 and <6> trains)
90	Williamsbridge Oval Park	Williamsbridge Oval Park	May 14, 2015 (#15000229)	Reservoir Oval East & West; 40°52′39″N 73°52′39″W	Norwood	WPA-funded park built on former reservoir site in 1937 features a Beaux Arts landscape and modernist recreation center
91	Woodlawn Cemetery	Woodlawn Cemetery	June 23, 2011 (#11000563)	Webster Avenue & East 233rd Street; 40°53′43″N 73°51′49″W	Woodlawn	Cemetery illustrates transition from rural cemetery to 20th-century styles; final resting place of Robert Moses, Elizabeth Cady Stanton and Jay Gould, among others.
92	Woodlawn Station (Dual System IRT)	Woodlawn Station (Dual System IRT)	July 6, 2005 (#05000679)	Junction of Bainbridge Avenue and Jerome Avenue; 40°53′09″N 73°52′45″W	Norwood near Woodlawn	Subway station (4 train); Arts and Crafts-inspired terminal station

== See also ==
  - Statewide: National Register of Historic Places listings in New York
  - Citywide: Manhattan, Queens, Staten Island, Brooklyn
  - List of New York City Designated Landmarks in The Bronx
