= Robert Colgate House =

Historic house in the Bronx, New York

- U.S. National Register of Historic Places
- New York City Landmark
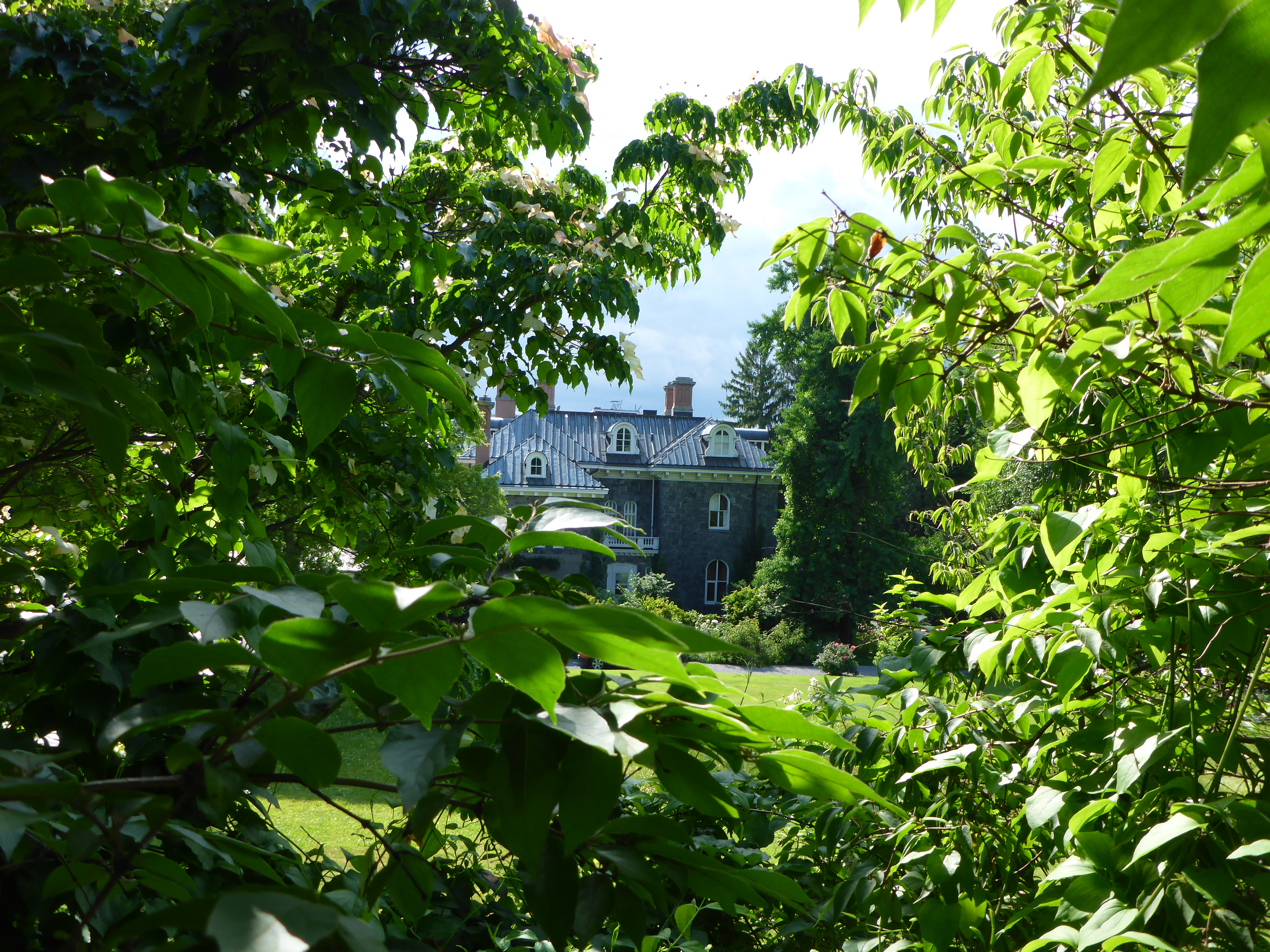
- Seen in June 2013
- Location: 5225 Sycamore Avenue, Bronx, New York
- Coordinates: 40°54′7″N 73°54′45″W
- Area: less than one acre
- Built: 1860
- Architectural style: Italianate
- NRHP reference No.: 83001638
- NYCL No.: 0672

Significant dates
- Added to NRHP: September 8, 1983
- Designated NYCL: October 13, 1970

Robert Colgate House, also known as Stonehurst, is a historic home located in the Hudson Hill section of the Bronx in New York City. It was built about 1860 and is a two-story picturesque Italianate villa built of ashlar Maine granite. It features a low-pitched dormered roof with broad eaves surrounding a flat deck. It was built for Robert Colgate (1812–1885), son of pioneer soap manufacturer William Colgate.

Colgate purchased the land in 1860 from Ann Cromwell; it had previously been owned by William G. Ackerman. The Riverdale Presbyterian Church was organized at a meeting held in Colgate's house in 1863.

It was listed on the National Register of Historic Places in 1983.

== See also ==
- National Register of Historic Places listings in the Bronx
- List of New York City Designated Landmarks in the Bronx
