= Fonthill Castle =

Fonthill Castle may refer to:

- Fonthill Castle and the Administration Building of the College of Mount St. Vincent, in The Bronx, New York, New York
- Fonthill (house), in Doylestown, Pennsylvania
