= Tremont Baptist Church =

Baptist church ch in the Bronx, New York

- U.S. National Register of Historic Places
- New York City Landmark
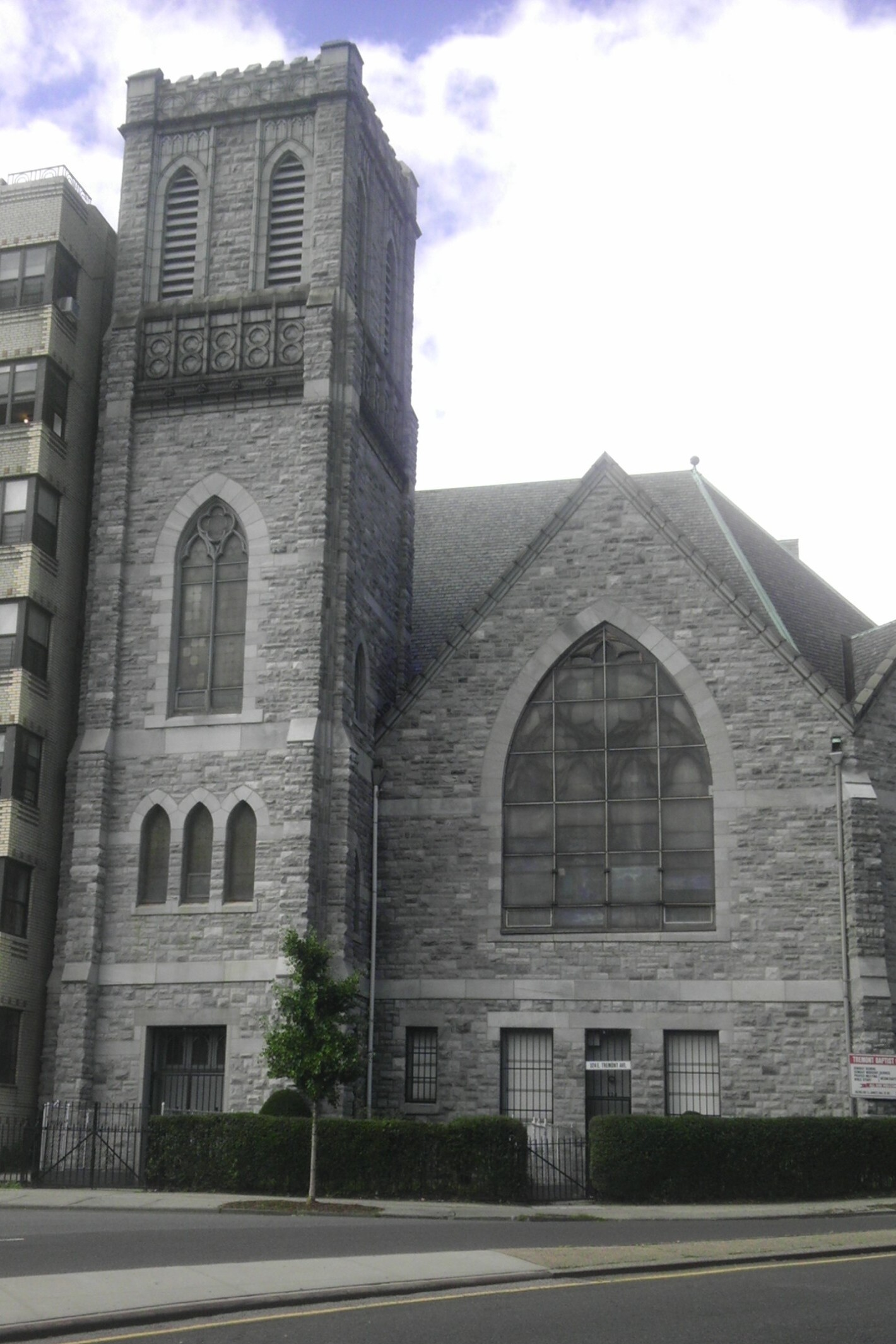
- Looking west at Tremont Baptist Church, 2012

- Location within New York City Location within New York Location within the United States
- Location: 324 East Tremont Avenue, Bronx, New York, U.S.
- Coordinates: 40°50′54″N 73°54′8″W
- Area: less than one acre
- Built: 1904–1912
- Architect: Birkmire, William H.
- Architectural style: Late Gothic Revival
- NRHP reference No.: 09000831
- NYCL No.: 2048

Significant dates
- Added to NRHP: October 16, 2009
- Designated NYCL: February 8, 2000

Tremont Baptist Church is an American historic Baptist church , located at 324 East Tremont Avenue in the Bronx, New York City, New York.

== Description and history ==
The church was built in two phases between 1904 and 1912.

It is a one-story building above a raised basement in the Late Gothic Revival style. It is 50 feet tall with a 75 foot tall offset corner tower. It is faced in gray marble, and features buttressed bays, pointed arch door and window openings, a high-pitched gable roof, and stained-glass windows.

The church building was added to the National Register of Historic Places in 2009.

== See also ==
- List of New York City Designated Landmarks in The Bronx
- National Register of Historic Places in Bronx County, New York
