= Public School 15 =

- U.S. National Register of Historic Places
- New York City Landmark
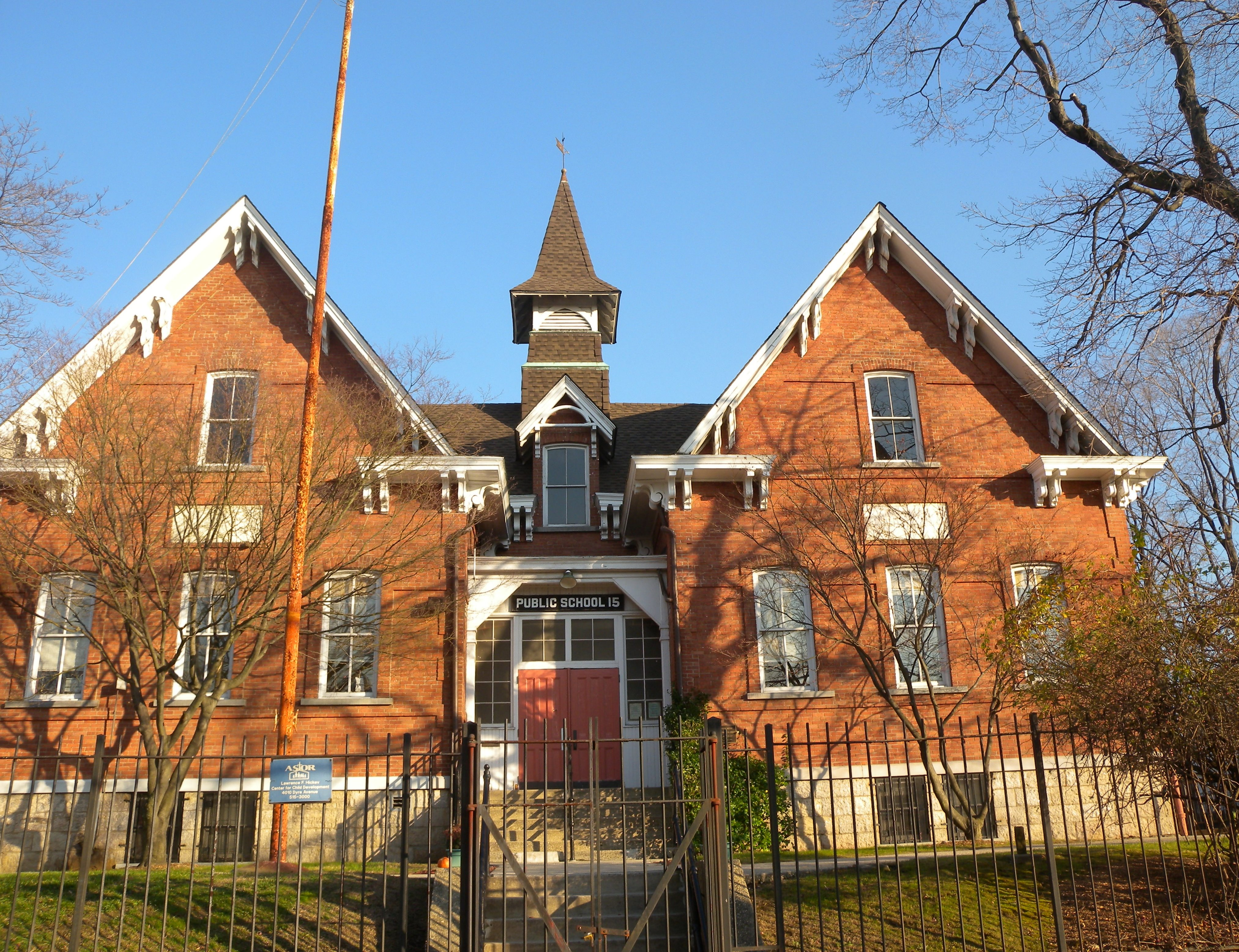
- Public School 15, November 2010

- Location within New York City Location within New York Location within the United States
- Location: 4010 Dyre Avenue, the Bronx, New York
- Coordinates: 40°53′27.4″N 73°49′51″W
- Area: less than one acre
- Built: 1877
- Architect: Cordial, Edward; Williams, Simon
- Architectural style: Gothic
- NRHP reference No.: 81000401
- NYCL No.: 0976

Significant dates
- Added to NRHP: December 10, 1981
- Designated NYCL: January 10, 1978

Public School 15 is a historic school in Eastchester in the Bronx, New York City. It was built in 1877 in the Victorian Gothic style. It is an H-shaped red brick building on a stone foundation. It features a central picturesque bell tower with a steep pyramidal roof topped by a weather vane. It ceased to be used as a school in the late 1970s and serves as a child care center.

It was listed on the National Register of Historic Places in 1981.

== See also ==
- List of New York City Designated Landmarks in the Bronx
- National Register of Historic Places in Bronx County, New York
