= Edgehill Church of Spuyten Duyvil =

Church in the Bronx, New York

- Edgehill Church of Spuyten Duyvil (Riverdale Presbyterian Chapel)
- U.S. National Register of Historic Places
- New York City Landmark
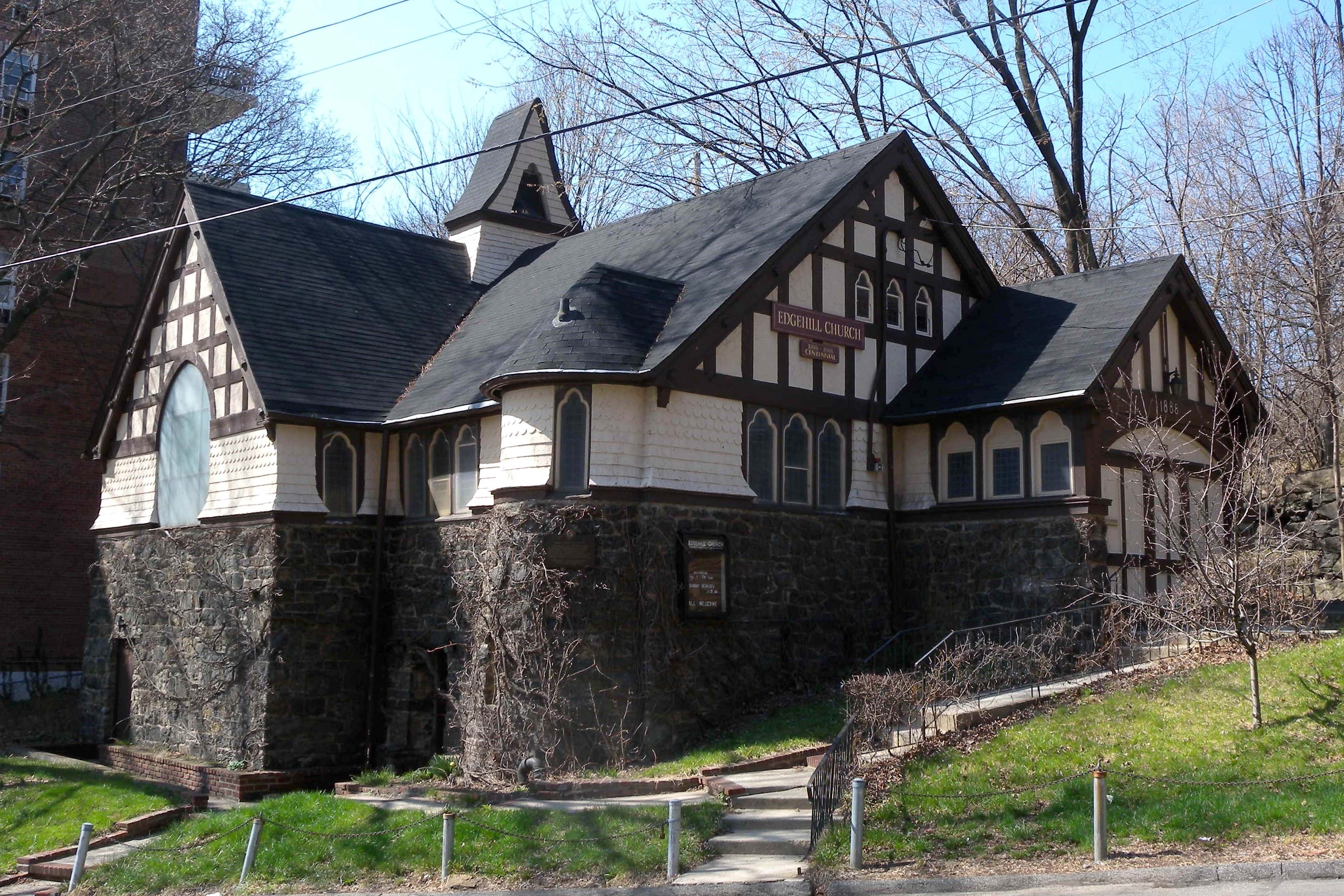
- eastern side (2009)

- Location within New York City Location within New York Location within the United States
- Location: 2570 Independence Ave. Spuyten Duyvil, Bronx, New York City
- Coordinates: 40°52′48″N 73°55′13″W
- Built: 1888-89
- Architect: Francis H. Kimball
- Architectural style: Romanesque Revival, Tudor Revival, Shingle style
- NRHP reference No.: 82001089

Significant dates
- Added to NRHP: October 29, 1982
- Designated NYCL: November 25, 1980

Edgehill Church at Spuyten Duyvil is a former United Church of Christ parish church located at 2570 Independence Avenue in the Spuyten Duyvil neighborhood of The Bronx in New York City. Its congregation was founded in 1869 as the mission chapel affiliated with the Riverdale Presbyterian Church, serving the workers at the nearby Johnson Iron Foundry. The church, described by the AIA Guide to New York City as a "picturesque eclectic sanctuary", was designed by architect Francis Kimball in a mixture of styles – Romanesque Revival, Tudor Revival and Shingle style – and was built from 1888–1889. It features stained glass windows designed by Louis Comfort Tiffany.

By 1977, the church's congregation had fallen dramatically. Plans were announced to close the church and convert it into a community center, the pastoral leadership was assumed by the Rev. Dr. William A. Tieck, a retired Methodist, who led the congregation until his death in 1997.

The church was designated a New York City landmark in 1980 under the name "Riverdale Presbyterian Chapel", and was added to the National Register of Historic Places on 1982.

In 2022, Edgehill Church was turned over to the Kingsbridge Historical Society, the oldest historical society in The Bronx.

== See also ==
- List of New York City Landmarks
- National Register of Historic Places listings in Bronx County, New York
- John Jay McKelvey Sr., Attorney, Founder of Harvard Law Review, Edgehill Church, Founder, Incorporator, Trustee.
