= High Pumping Station =

- U.S. National Register of Historic Places
- New York City Landmark
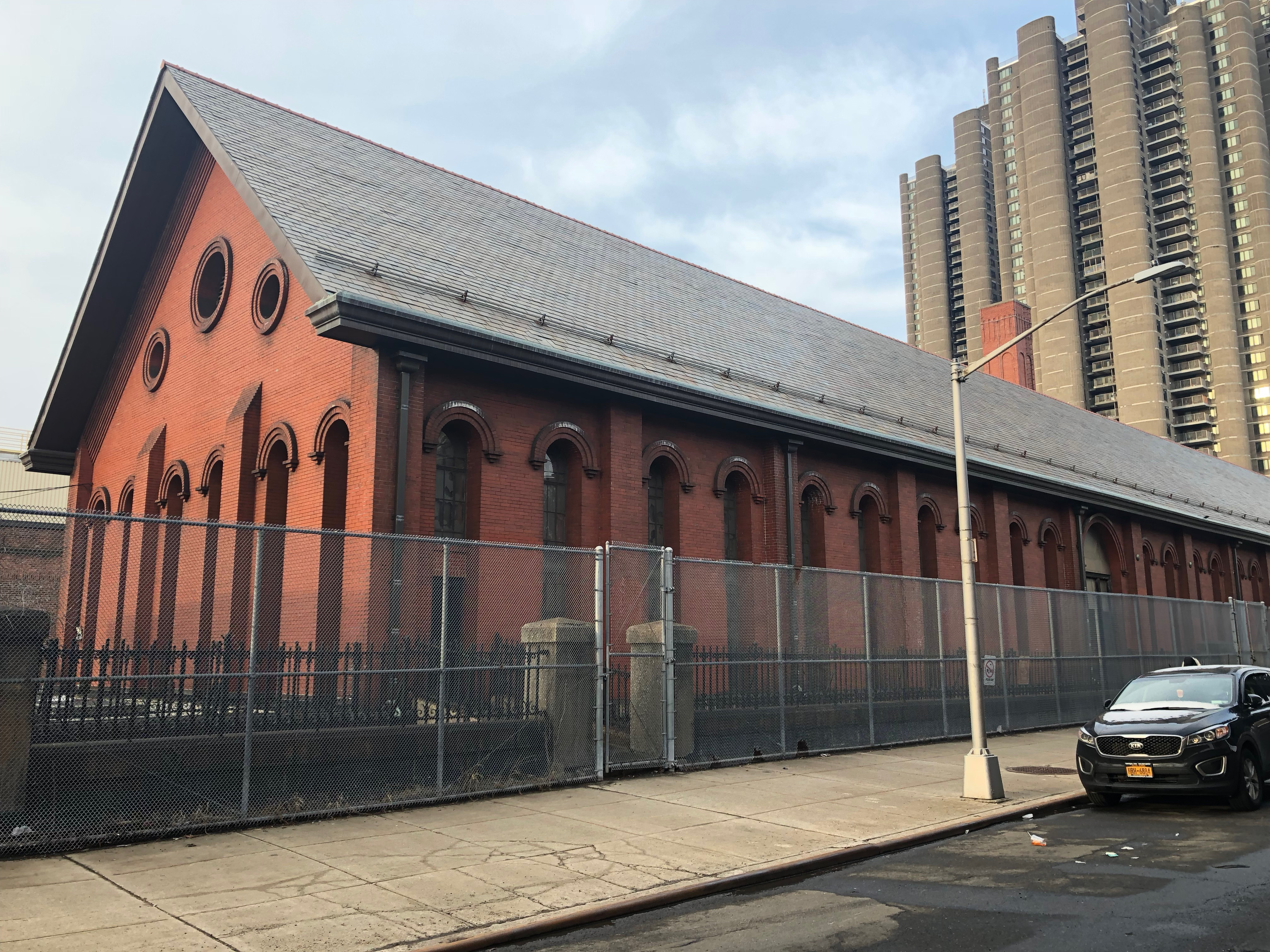
- High Pumping Station. Tracey Towers loom in the background.

- Location within New York City Location within New York Location within the United States
- Location: Jerome Ave., The Bronx
- Coordinates: 40°52′42″N 73°53′12″W
- Area: 2 acres (0.81 ha)
- Built: 1901
- Architect: Birdsall, George W.
- Architectural style: Romanesque
- NRHP reference No.: 83003882
- NYCL No.: 1080

Significant dates
- Added to NRHP: November 10, 1983
- Designated NYCL: July 28, 1981

High Pumping Station is a historic pumping station located in Jerome Park, Bronx, New York City. It was built between 1901 and 1906, and is a rectangular red brick building with a steeply pitched slate covered gable roof. It was built as part of the Jerome Park Reservoir complex.

It was listed on the National Register of Historic Places in 1983.

The station is run by the New York City Department of Environmental Protection.

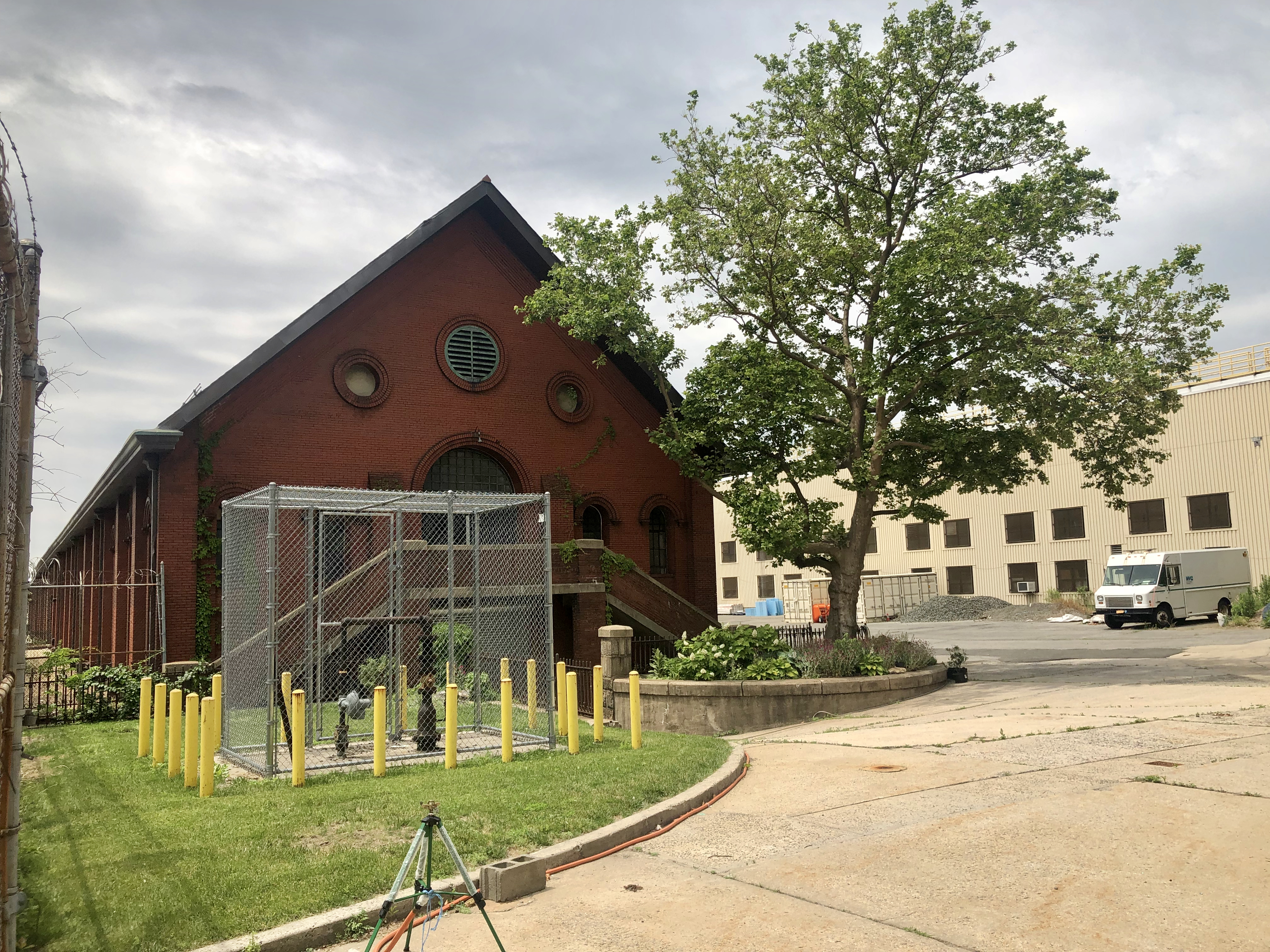
High Pumping Station

== See also ==
- List of New York City Designated Landmarks in The Bronx
- National Register of Historic Places in Bronx County, New York
