= 52nd Police Precinct Station =

- U.S. National Register of Historic Places
- New York City Landmark
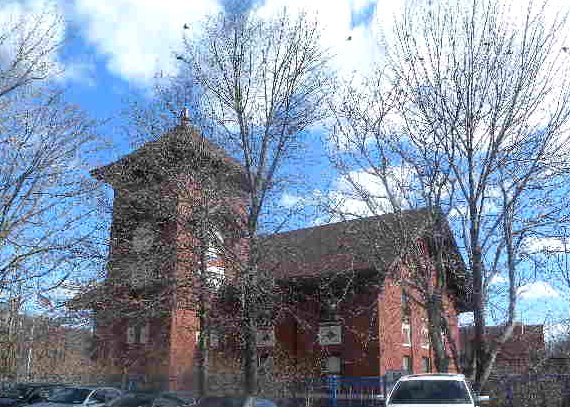
- Interactive map of 52nd Police Precinct Station
- Location: 3016 Webster Avenue, Bronx, New York 10467, USA
- Coordinates: 40°52′9″N 73°52′47″W
- Area: less than one acre
- Built: 1904
- Architect: Stoughton & Stoughton
- Architectural style: Late 19th And 20th Century Revivals, Tuscan Villa
- NRHP reference No.: 82001091
- NYCL No.: 0771

Significant dates
- Added to NRHP: October 29, 1982
- Designated NYCL: June 18, 1974

52nd Police Precinct Station is a historic police station located in the Norwood section of the Bronx, New York City. It was built 1904–1906 and is a three-story, red brick structure approximately 50 feet by 80 feet in size. It is in the style of a Tuscan villa. It features a 21-foot square clock tower with large polychrome terracotta clock faces on three sides. Originally known as the 41st precinct, it was redesignated as the 52nd in the 1929 city-wide precinct renumbering.

The station was built in response to an increasing need for police protection after the area was annexed to New York City in 1898 and the population began to increase.

In 1921, the NYPD estimated the value of the building to be $125,000 (equivalent to $1,700,000 in 2024), and the 90-by-170-foot (27 m × 52 m) lot to be $15,000 (equivalent to $210,000 in 2024).

It was designated a New York City Landmark in 1974 and was listed on the National Register of Historic Places in 1982. The architects were Stoughton & Stoughton of Mount Vernon, New York.

== Gallery ==
52nd Police Precinct Station House and Stable
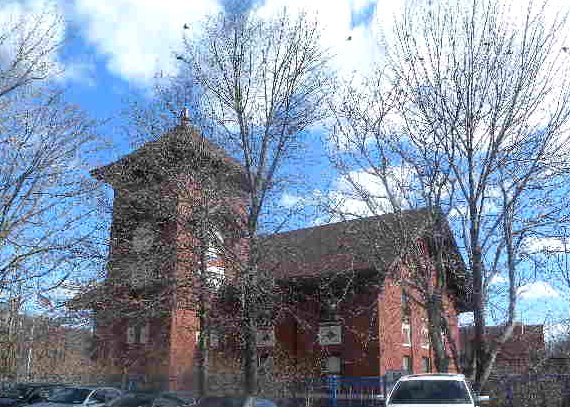
52nd Police Precinct Station House

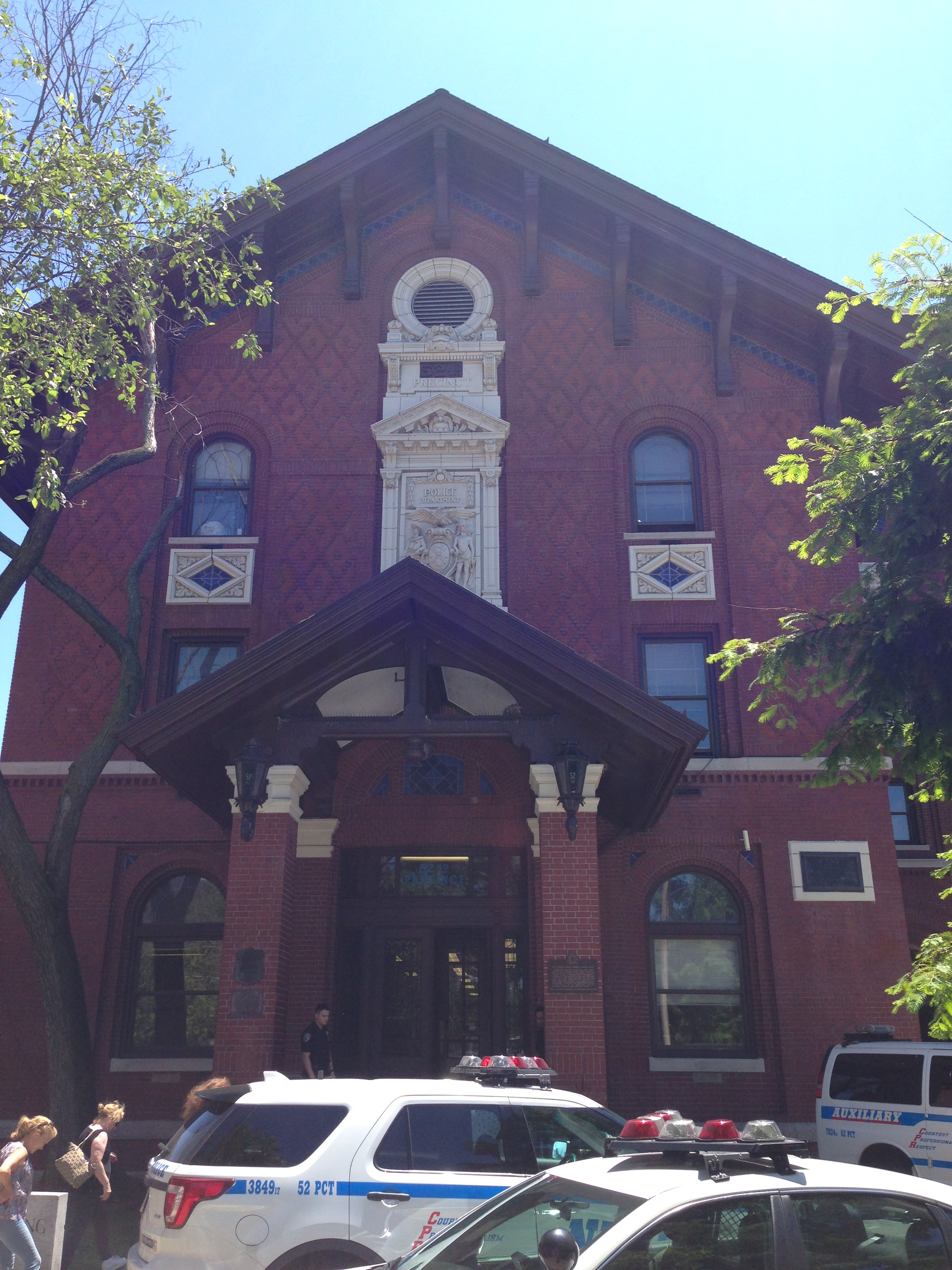
52nd Police Precinct Station House

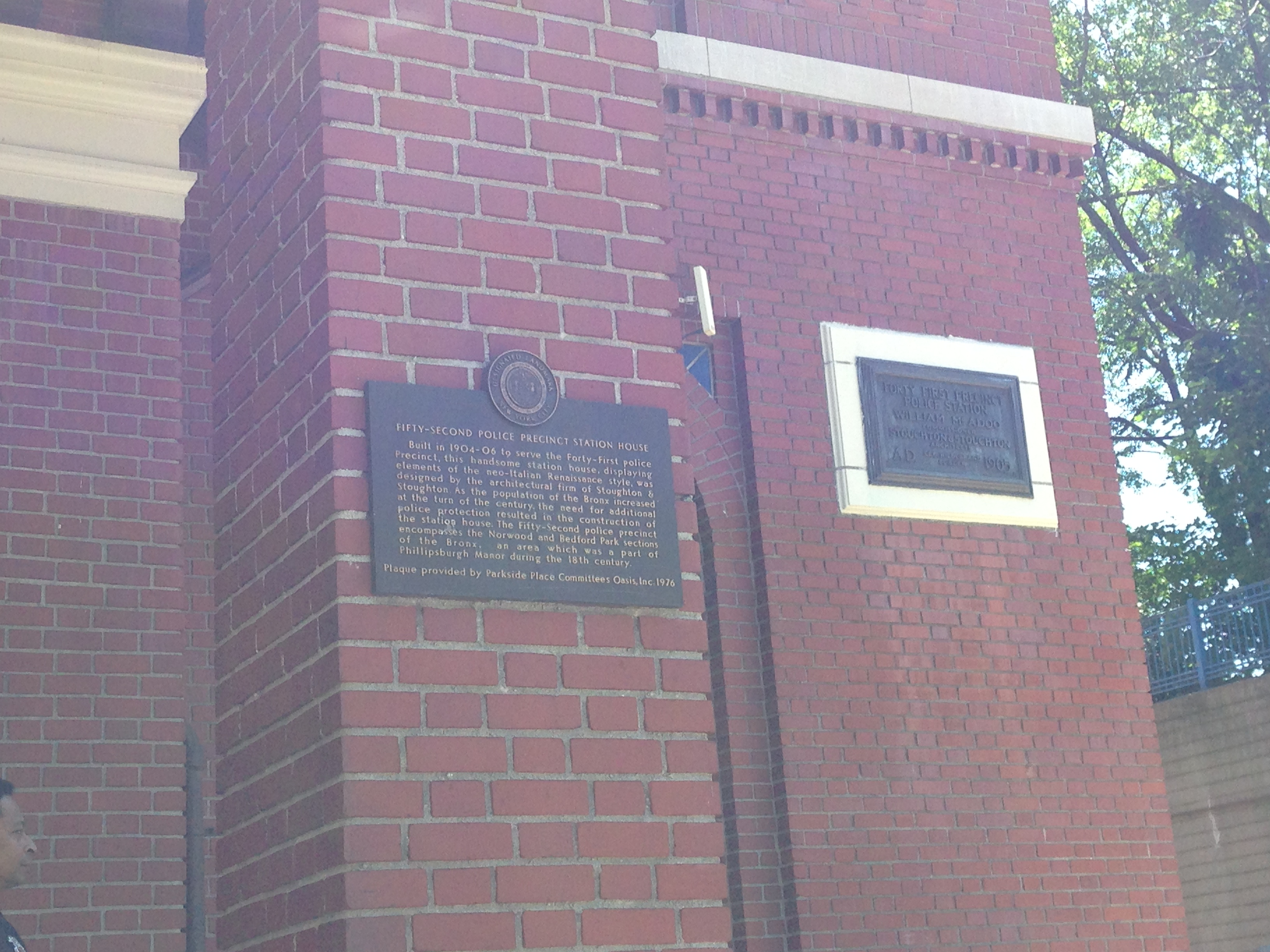
52nd Police Precinct Station House

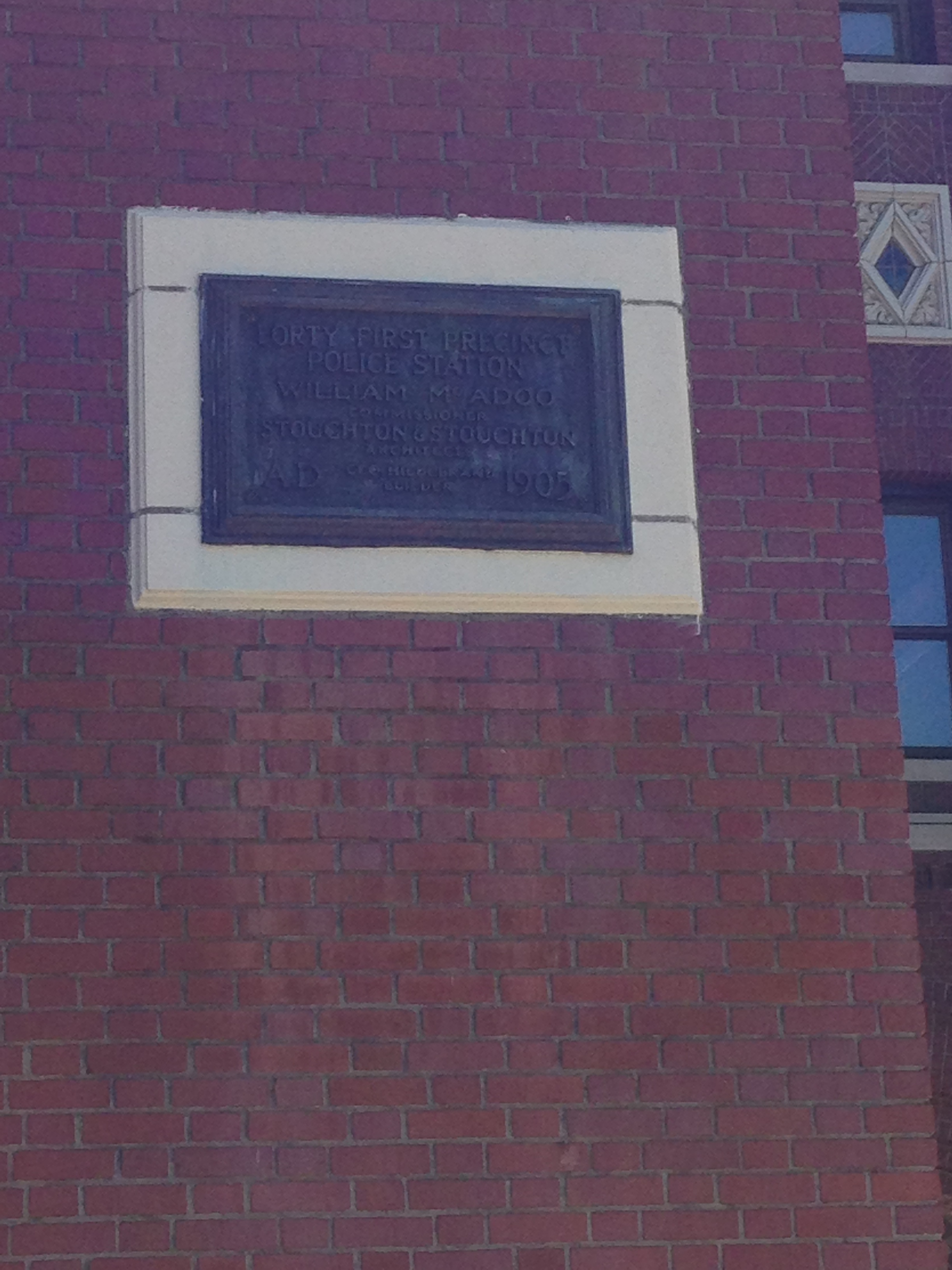
Placard at the 52nd Police Precinct Station

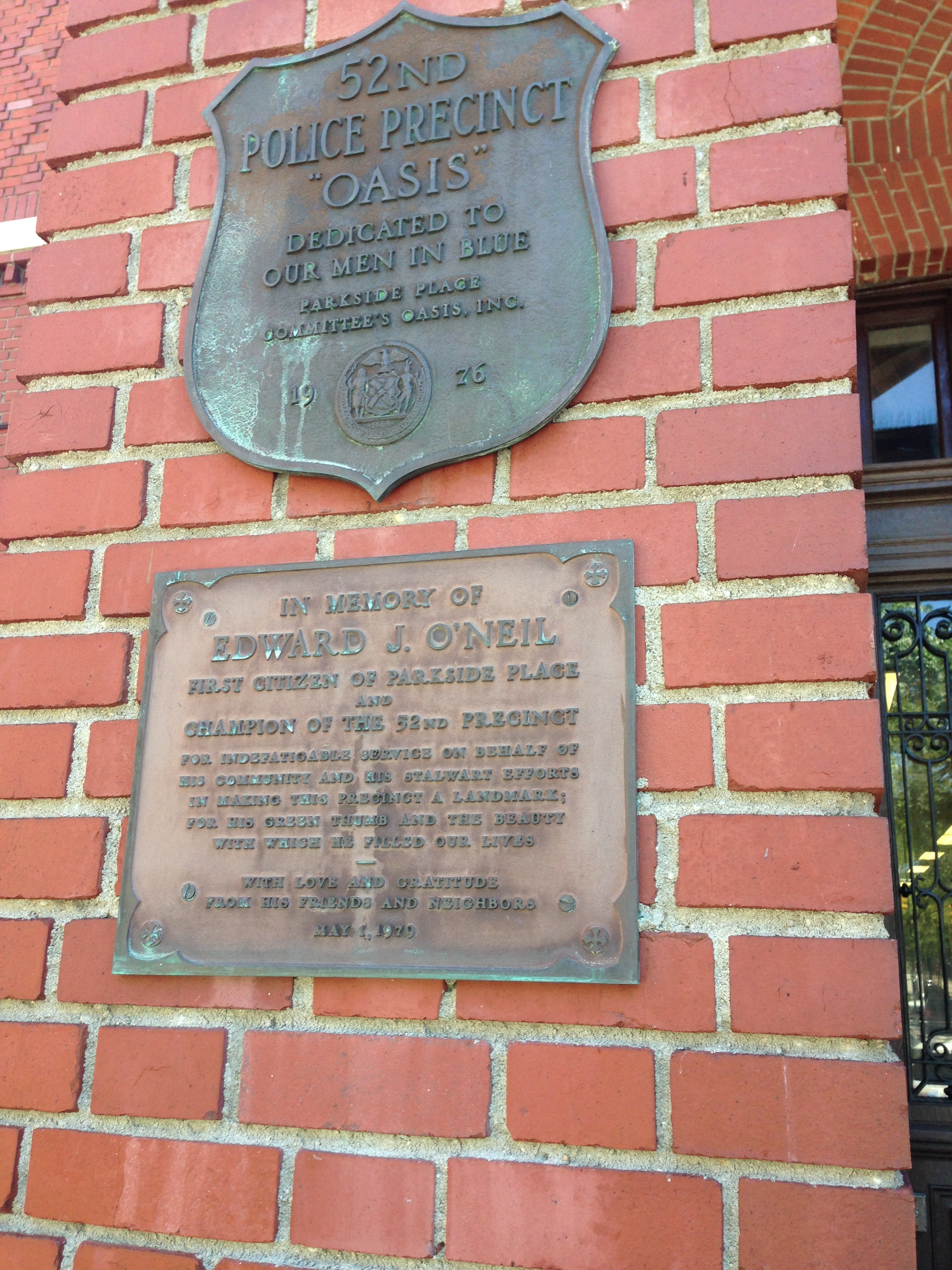
Placard at the Station House

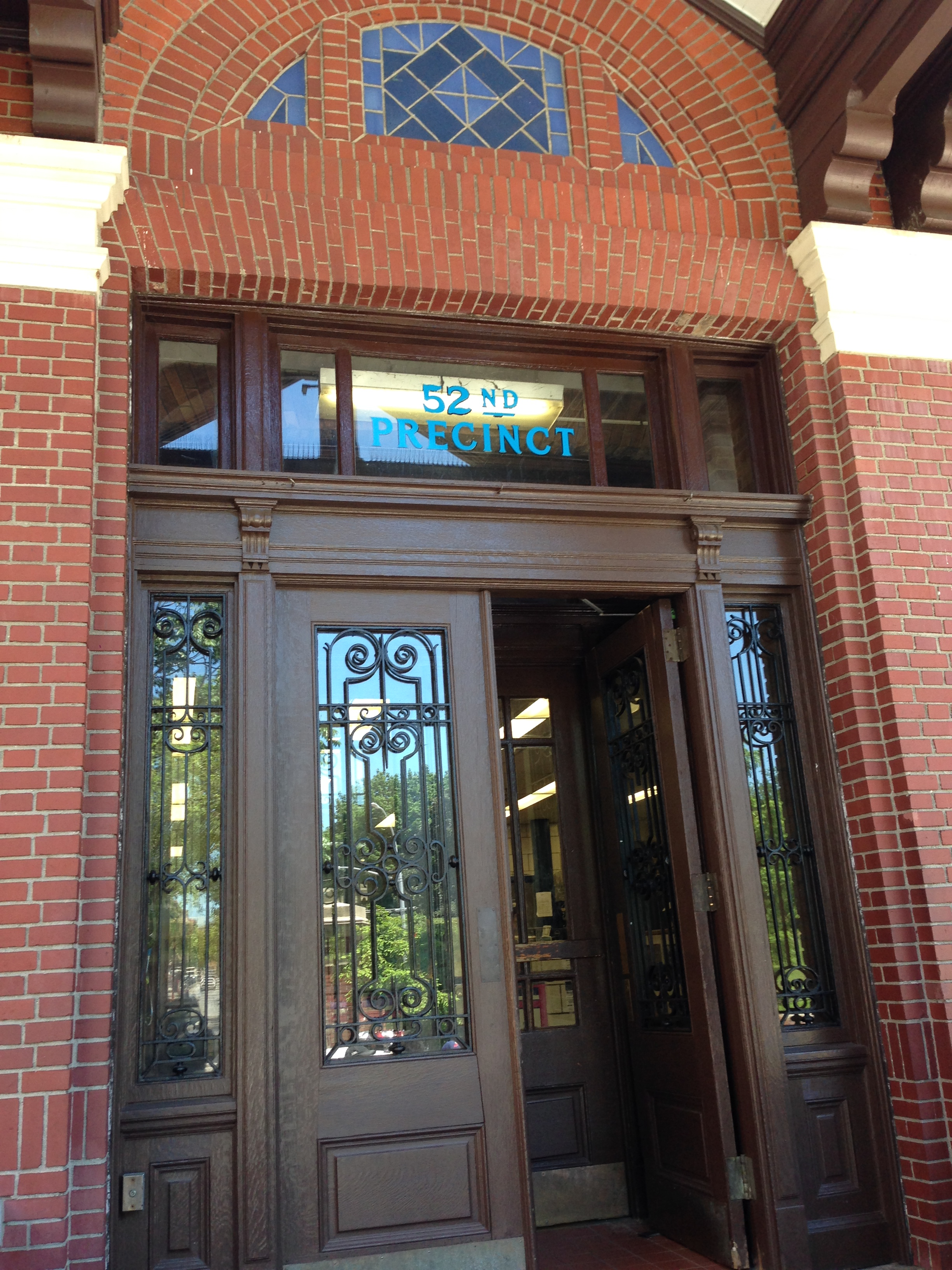
Front entrance to the Station House

== See also ==
- List of New York City Designated Landmarks in the Bronx
- National Register of Historic Places listings in the Bronx
