= Riverdale Presbyterian Church Complex =

Church in the Bronx, New York

- U.S. National Register of Historic Places
- New York City Landmark
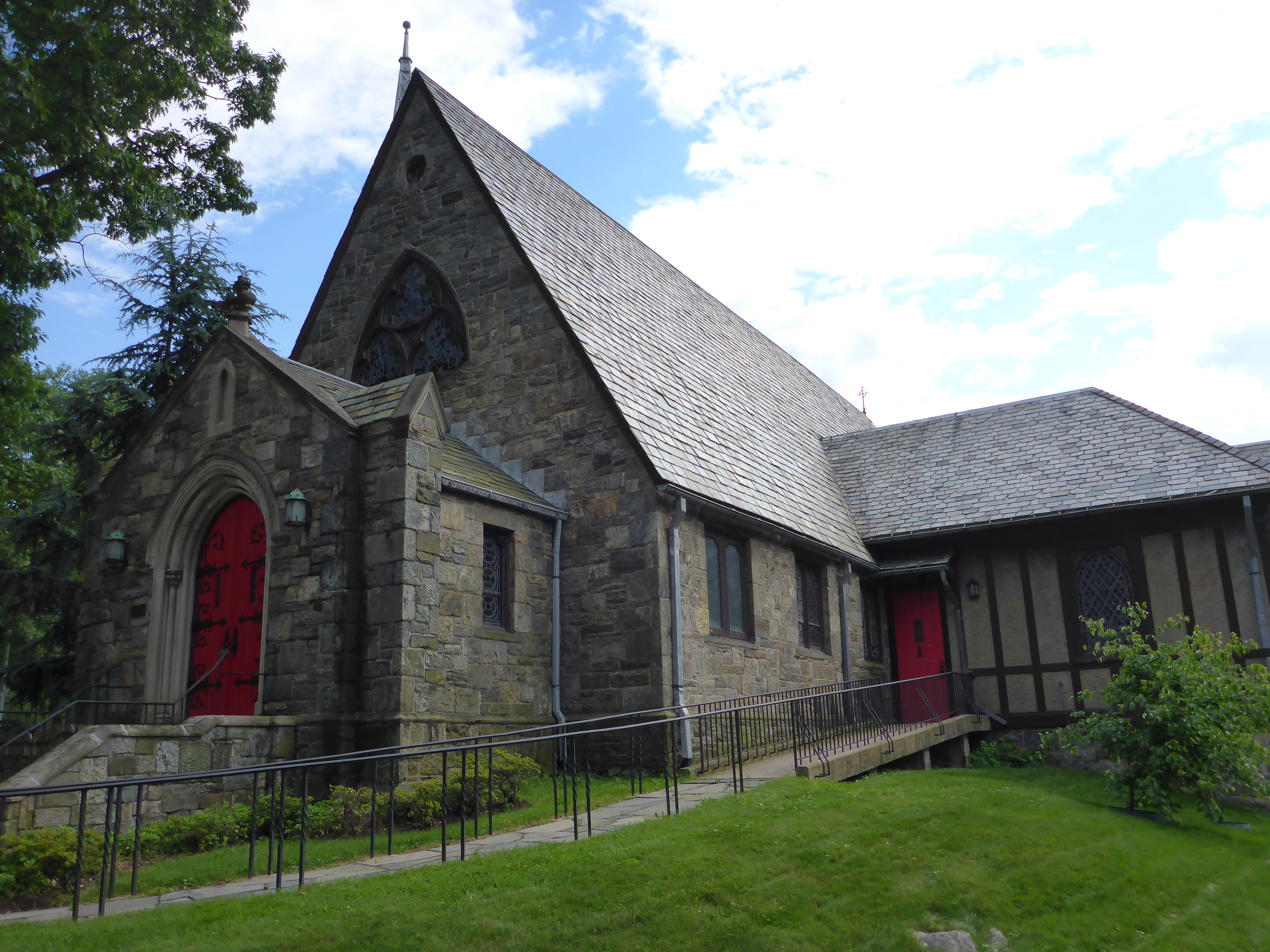
- (June 2013)

- Location within New York City Location within New York Location within the United States
- Location: 4761-4765 Henry Hudson Parkway, The Bronx, New York City
- Coordinates: 40°53′45″N 73°54′32″W
- Built: 1863-64
- Architect: James Renwick Jr. Dwight James Baum
- Architectural style: Late Gothic Revival, Stick
- NRHP reference No.: 82001092

Significant dates
- Added to NRHP: October 14, 1982
- Designated NYCL: April 19, 1966

Riverdale Presbyterian Church is a historic Presbyterian church located at 4761-4765 Henry Hudson Parkway in the Riverdale neighborhood of the Bronx, New York City. It was designed in 1863 by architect James Renwick Jr. The church is a fieldstone building in an English-inspired Late Gothic Revival style. It was substantially enlarged in 1936.

The complex also includes a stone manse, the Duff House, also designed by Renwick, and a Stick Style cottage, called the Duff or Gardener's Cottage, built in 1875. In his original design for the Duff House, Renwick combined a mansard roof with gables and dormers in the Gothic Revival style.

The complex was designated a New York City landmark in 1966, and was listed on the National Register of Historic Places in 1982.

The congregation established the Edgehill Church at Spuyten Duyvil in 1869 as a chapel; it is now an independent church.

== See also ==
- List of New York City Designated Landmarks in The Bronx
- National Register of Historic Places listings in Bronx County, New York
