= William E. Dodge House =

Historic house in the Bronx, New York

- U.S. National Register of Historic Places
- New York City Landmark
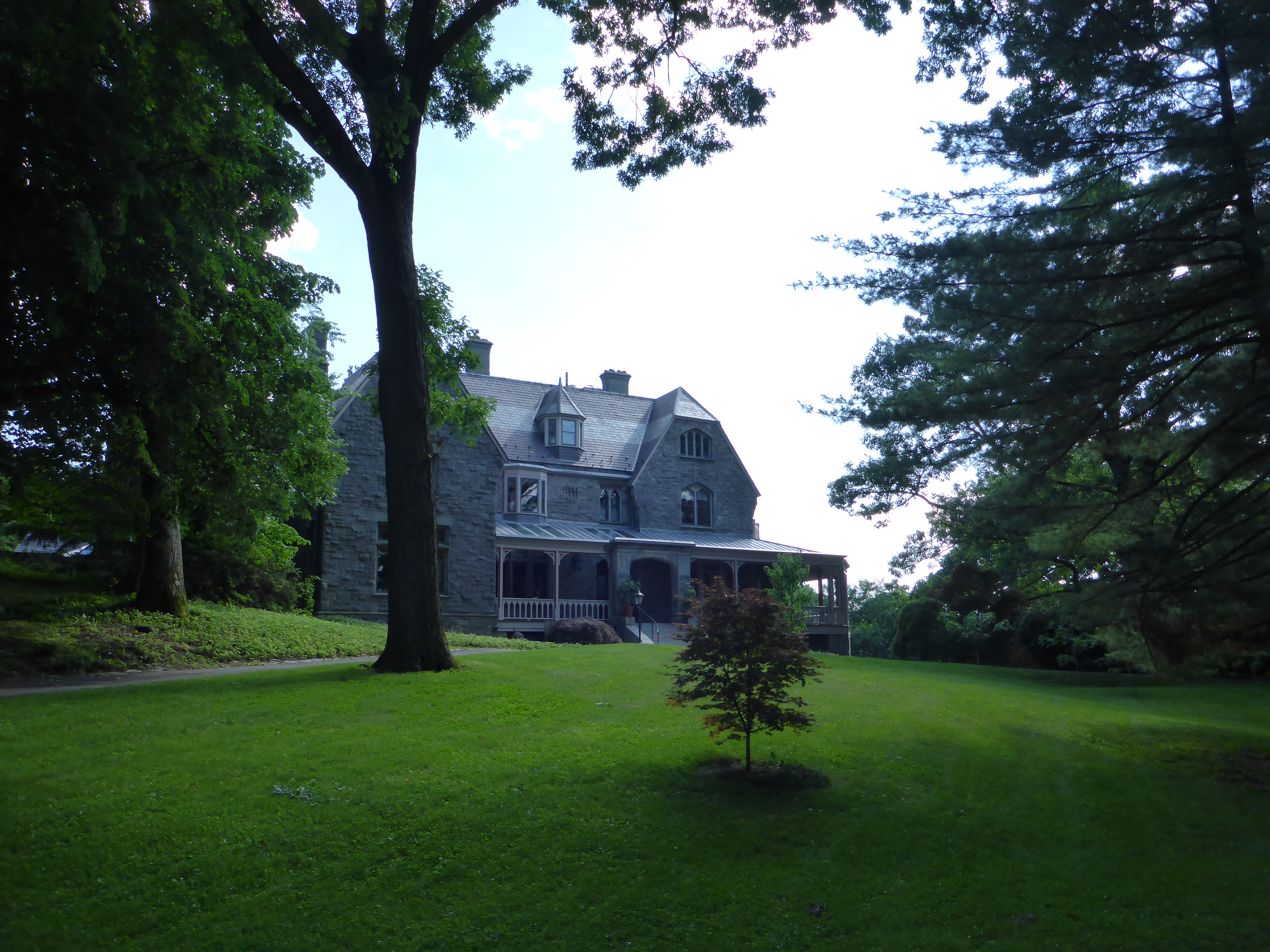
- William E. Dodge House, June 2013

- Location within New York City Location within New York Location within the United States
- Location: 690 W. 247th St., Bronx, New York
- Coordinates: 40.894787°N 73.913162°W
- Area: less than one acre
- Built: 1863
- Architect: Renwick, James
- Architectural style: Gothic, Tudor Gothic
- NRHP reference No.: 77000934
- NYCL No.: 0672

Significant dates
- Added to NRHP: August 28, 1977
- Designated NYCL: October 13, 1970

William E. Dodge House, also known as Greyston Conference Center, is a historic home located in the Hudson Hill section of Riverdale in the Bronx in New York City. It was built in 1863 and designed by architect James Renwick Jr. It is a 2 1/2-story masonry structure in the Gothic Revival style. It was built for copper tycoon William E. Dodge Jr. (1832–1903) as a summer residence and expanded in 1892 as a year-round suburban home. It was formally dedicated on May 27, 1963, as the Greyston Conference Center, of Teachers College, Columbia University.

It was listed on the National Register of Historic Places in 1977.

== See also ==
- List of New York City Designated Landmarks in The Bronx
- National Register of Historic Places in Bronx County, New York
