= Anthony Campagna =

Italian American real estate developer (1884–1969)

- Born: December 31, 1884; Castelmezzano, Basilicata, Italy
- Died: May 8, 1969 (aged 84); New York City, New York, U.S.
- Resting place: Ferncliff Cemetery
- Education: University of Naples
- Occupation: Real estate developer
- Known for: Developer of 960 Fifth Avenue
- Spouse: Marie Paterno
- Children: 2
- Relatives: Charles V. Paterno (brother-in-law)
- Awards: Order of the Crown of Italy

Anthony (born Antonio) Campagna, Count of Castelmezzano (December 31, 1884 – May 8, 1969) was a prominent real estate developer and member of the Board of Education in New York City. Today, he is best known for the destruction of architecturally significant buildings and the subsequent development of new luxury buildings in New York City.

== Early life ==
Campagna was born in Castelmezzano, Italy in 1884. His father was a builder. His brother Armino Campagna (1898–1985), who married his wife's sister Christina Paterno, also moved to New York and worked in real estate with him.

He received his preliminary education in Potenza, later attended the University of Rome and graduated, with honors, from the law school at the University of Naples in 1906.

== Career ==
After graduating from law school, he moved to Chicago to work with on an Italian language newspaper. During a visit to New York City. he met with several builders inspiring him to change his profession and move to New York.

=== Real estate ===
In 1909, he moved to New York to work for the Paterno Brothers construction firm. Campagna later formed the company Campagna Construction Company, and was responsible for building several of the most prominent luxury apartments in the City following World War I, including 960 Fifth Avenue, 35 Park Avenue and 530 Park Avenue. He also developed 173-175 Riverside Drive which occupied the entire blockfront between 89th Street and 90th Street on the Upper West Side.

In 1927, he purchased 962 Fifth Avenue for $3 million (equivalent to $55,076,000 in 2025). The building, which was the residence of the late Senator William A. Clark and cost $7 million to build, was sold by Clark's widow and daughter, Huguette Clark, who moved to 907 Fifth Avenue. Campagana had the mansion torn down just 19 years after it was built in 1911. Campagna hired Warren & Wetmore and architect Rosario Candela to design the new building, along with Dorothy Draper, the prominent interior decorator. The building was completed in 1928 and the original apartments were priced from $130,000 to $325,000. More than 75 percent of the apartments were sold before the frame of the building was enclosed. The largest initial stockholder in the building was Dr. Preston Pope Satterwhite who reportedly paid $450,000 for his 20-room apartment, which was considered the most expensive cooperative sale ever paid at the time.

In 1935, as the executive head of Rialto Times Square Inc., he was responsible for tearing down the old Rialto Theatre, developed by Paramount Pictures and located at 42nd Street and Seventh Avenue. After Campagna demolished the theatre, he rebuilt it on a smaller scale and dedicated the rest of the building to shops and office space.

=== Philanthropy ===
In addition, he was the founder of the Casa Italiana at Columbia University, which was originally opened as an outreach of the Italian government of Benito Mussolini. In 1926-27, he hired William M. Kendall of McKim, Mead & White to design the building in the Renaissance style, modeled after a 15th-century Roman palazzo, which was built by his firm.

He traveled back to Italy and helped restore Virgil's tomb in Naples and a Roman tower in Minturno.

=== Honors ===
In 1929, he was conferred the order of Grand Officer of the Crown of Italy by Dr. Emanuele Grazzi, Consul General of Italy.

In 1930, he was bestowed with the title Count of Castelmezzano by King Victor Emmanuel III of Italy. Reportedly, he did not use the title, stating: "Builder is title enough."

=== Political career ===
In 1943, Campagna was appointed by New York City Mayor Fiorello LaGuardia to replace Dr. Bonaschi and serve as a Bronx member of the New York City Board of Education. He served as chairman on the Committee of Building and Sites in the 1940s, and directed a $100 million program to construct schools. He retired from the Board in 1949.

== Personal life ==
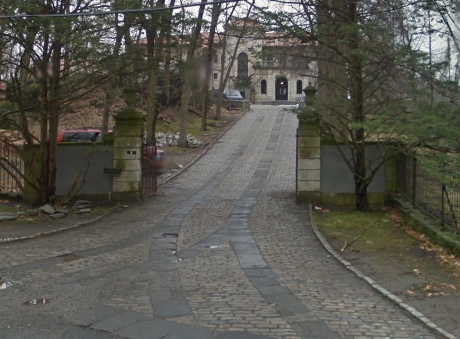
The driveway to the Anthony Campagna Estate

Campagna was married to Marie Paterno (1885–1967). She was the daughter of Giovanni Paterno and Carolina Trivigno Paterno and the sister of Joseph and Charles V. Paterno. Marie was also from Castelmezzano and was the daughter of his former employer at Paterno Brothers. Together, they were the parents of:

- Joseph Anthony Campagna, who married Irene Harriet Dunkak, daughter of Henry Dunkak, in 1937.
- John J. Campagna, who married Irene Winslow, the daughter of Dr. Paul Vergil Winslow, in 1937.

Campagna died in his sleep at the age of 84 on May 8, 1969, at his apartment in Delmonico's Hotel in New York City. He was interred at Ferncliff Cemetery and Mausoleum in Hartsdale, New York.

=== Residence ===
Campagna and his wife lived in the Riverdale section of the Bronx, where Campagna purchased land from Percy Rivington Pyne and built the now landmark palatial residence at 640 West 249th Street, across the street from Wave Hill, the "oldest Riverdale mansion" and the former residence of Arturo Toscanini, Mark Twain, Theodore Roosevelt, and George Walbridge Perkins. The home, modeled after an Italian villa, was built in 1929 to 1930 and was designed by architect Dwight James Baum and landscape architect Ferruccio Vitale and his partner, Alfred Geiffert, Jr., who won the 1934 gold medal in landscape architecture from the Architectural League of New York for the property. As of 2011, the building was owned by Yeshiva of Telshe Alumni.

=== Descendants ===
Through his son John, he was the grandfather of David Winslow Campagna (b. 1939), who married Jered A. McAllister in 1963.
