= Christ Church (Bronx) =

Episcopal church in the Bronx, New York

- Christ Church Complex
- U.S. National Register of Historic Places
- New York City Landmark
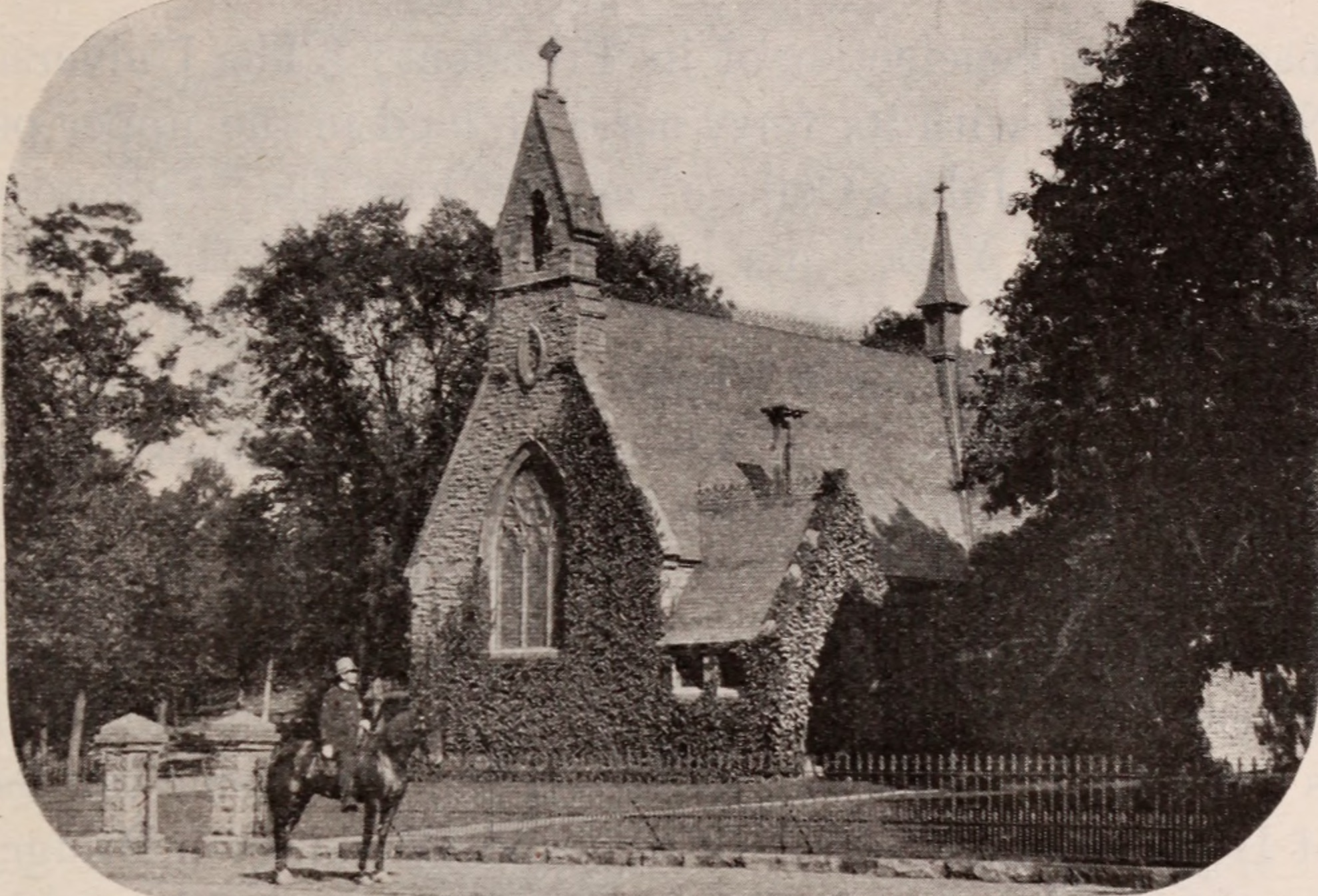
- Christ Church in the 1890s

- Location within New York City Location within New York Location within the United States
- Location: 5040 Henry Hudson Parkway East, Bronx, New York
- Coordinates: 40°53′57″N 73°54′24″W
- Area: 1.2 acres (0.49 ha)
- Built: 1866
- Architects: Richard M. Upjohn of Upjohn & Co.
- Architectural style: High Victorian Gothic
- Website: christchurchriverdale.org
- NRHP reference No.: 83001637

Significant dates
- Added to NRHP: September 08, 1983
- Designated NYCL: January 11, 1967

Christ Church Riverdale is a historic Episcopal parish church and related structures at 5040 Henry Hudson Parkway East in Riverdale, Bronx, New York City.

The church was founded in 1866 and its building, made from brick and local stone with a simple pierced-wall belfry; the church building was built in 1866 to designs by architect Richard M. Upjohn. It was added to the National Register of Historic Places in 1983. The building underwent exterior restoration in 1991 and 1992, and it was designated as a New York City landmark.

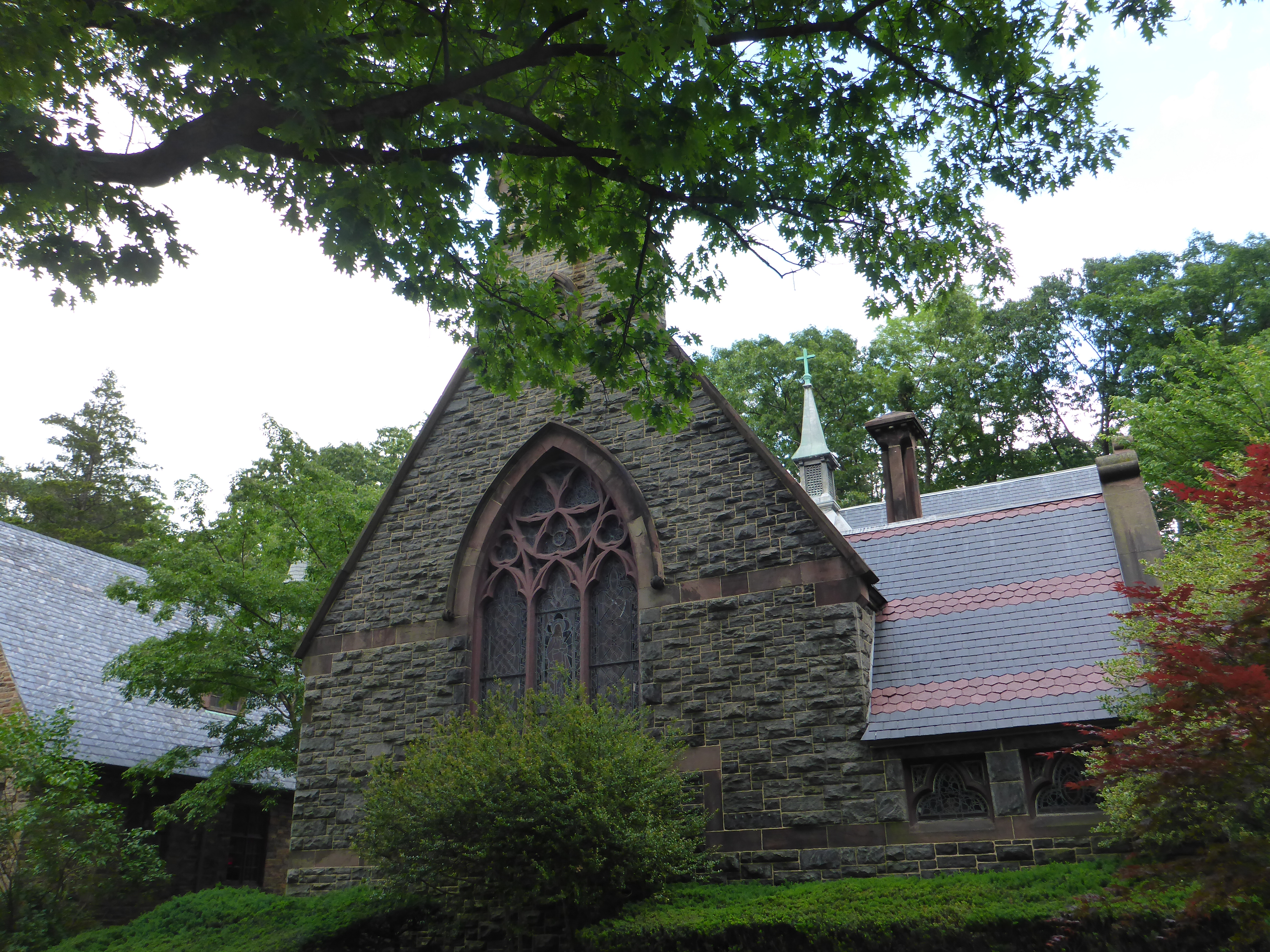
The church in 2013

Rev. Gustav Cartensen was Rector until 1919. He was the first to permit attendance of black children from a nearby "Negro orphan asylum". He was then invited to take the pulpit at Holyrood Episcopal Church. His "liberal" positions garnered "widespread publicity," according to The New York Times.

== Funeral of Lou Gehrig ==
In June 1941 the church was the site of the funeral of former New York Yankee baseball player Lou Gehrig, whose home was nearby.
