= Fonthill Castle and the Administration Building of the College of Mount St. Vincent =

- U.S. National Register of Historic Places
- New York City Landmark
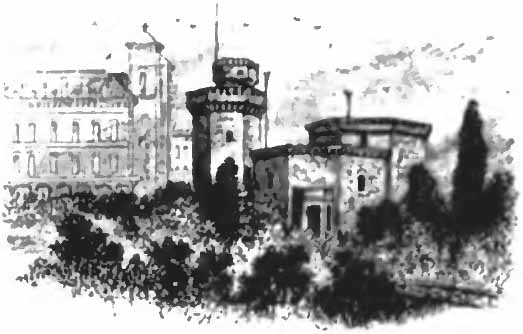
- Fonthill Castle, c. 1900

- Location within New York City Location within New York Location within the United States
- Location: W. 261st St. and Riverdale Ave., New York, New York
- Coordinates: 40°54′49″N 73°54′34″W
- Area: 11 acres (4.5 ha)
- Built: Fonthill: 1852; Administration bldg.: 1859
- Architect: Fonthill: Thomas L. Smith; Admin.: Engelbert, Henry; Wenz, E.
- Architectural style: Fonthill: Gothic Revival; Admin.: Early Romanesque revival
- NRHP reference No.: 80002585
- NYCL No.: 0133

Significant dates
- Added to NRHP: July 11, 1980
- Designated NYCL: March 15, 1966

Fonthill Castle and the Administration Building of the College of Mount St. Vincent are two historic buildings located at the College of Mount Saint Vincent in The Bronx, New York, New York.

== Fonthill Castle ==
Fonthill Castle was built in 1852 as the country estate of Shakespearean actor Edwin Forrest and his wife, the actress Catherine Norton Sinclair. According to Lawrence Barrett, the plans were formed by Mrs. Forrest and approved by her husband. Steven E. Smith noted that in laying the cornerstone, Forrest set into it a few coins and a volume of Shakespeare. The castle was located on the slopes above the Hudson River as the Hudson River Railroad planned to lay its tracks along the river. The name Fonthill was derived from William Beckford's Gothic Fonthill Abbey in England.

Forrest later sold the property to the Sisters of Charity of New York who relocated the Academy of Mount Saint Vincent from McGowan's Pass when the City of New York was developing Central Park. The castle has served as a convent, chapel, museum, chaplain's residence, and the college library. It later came to house the admissions office of the College of Mount Saint Vincent.

Fonthill is a Gothic Revival style building consisting of a cluster of six octagonal towers at varying heights, built of hammered grey stone. Five of the towers radiate from a three-story central tower. A sketch of Fonthill's octagons among the papers of Alexander Jackson Davis suggests that he had some part in its design, although it has also been attributed to Thomas C. Smith. In 1942, the castle became the Elizabeth Seton Library and, in 1969, the college admissions office.

== Administration Building ==
The Administration Building was built between 1857 and 1859 in the Early Romanesque revival style. The initial structure of the administration building was designed built by Henry Engelbert, an architect active in NYC from 1852–1879. The building was expanded in 1865, 1883, 1906–1908, and in 1951. The original building is a five-story red brick building on a fieldstone base. It features a six-story square tower topped by a copper lantern and spire. The tower is flanked by five story gabled sections. At the base of the tower, a double stairway rises from a porte cochere to the level of the veranda, leading to the entrance.

In 1910 the Academy of Mount St. Vincent became the College of Mount Saint Vincent. The original academy building now serves as the Administration building of the college, and the additions house related administrative and academic functions. The 1951 wing was added to the northern end of the complex and serves as the Convent of Mount St. Vincent.

They were listed on the National Register of Historic Places in 1980.

== See also ==
- List of New York City Designated Landmarks in The Bronx
- National Register of Historic Places in Bronx County, New York
