= Hudson Hill, Bronx =

Neighborhood in New York City

Hudson Hill
- Neighborhood of the Bronx
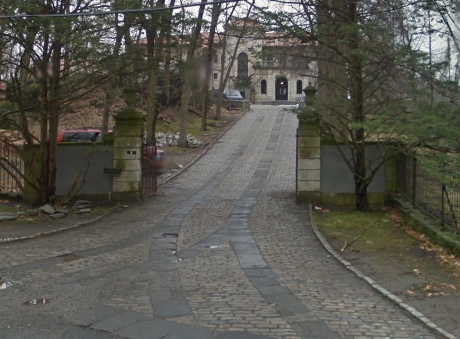
- The former Anthony Campagna mansion on West 249th Street, now part of Yeshiva of Telshe Alumni
- Interactive map of Hudson Hill
- Coordinates: 40.897°N 73.912°W
- Country: United States
- State: New York
- City: New York City
- Borough: The Bronx
- Community District: Bronx 8

Hudson Hill, also known as Riverdale Estates, is within the Riverdale neighborhood of the Bronx in New York City, bordered by the Henry Hudson Parkway on the east, the Hudson River on the west, West 246th Street on the south and West 254th Street on the north.

== History ==
Hudson Hill rests on a natural slope beside the Hudson River, with successive streets west of the Henry Hudson Parkway rising parallel to one-another as they continue east of the water. Early suggestions for the area's name included "Hudson Hillside Estates" and "Hillside Estates". Realtor Robert E. Hill was the first to formally distinguish Riverdale's "Estate Area", a designation which led to higher property values.

Hudson Hill mansions include Greyston (1864), Alderbrook (1880), Stonehurst (1861), and Oaklawn (1863). Such a rich history led to a unanimous vote by the New York City Landmarks Preservation Commission to create the Riverdale Historic District, bound roughly by 252d and 254th Streets and Palisade and Independence Avenues. The October 1990 vote noted that many features commonly associated with the American romantic suburb of the mid-19th century are present in the area and throughout Hudson Hill, including a picturesque site, landscaping and architecture; ready access to the city; and a layout adapted to the topography.

Hudson Hill is the location of the Wave Hill botanical gardens and historical center. Its Wave Hill House was home for a time to Mark Twain, among others.

Across the street from Wave Hill lies an old estate (the former Anthony Campagna mansion at 640 West 249th Street) that some believe to have been featured in the motion picture The Godfather. Today, it is a dormitory for the Yeshiva of Telshe Alumni.

Joseph P. Kennedy Sr. settled his family in a stately twenty-room Georgian-style mansion at 5040 Independence Avenue from 1927 to 1929. Across the street from the home lies the retirement estate of former New York City Mayor Fiorello H. La Guardia.

== Gallery ==
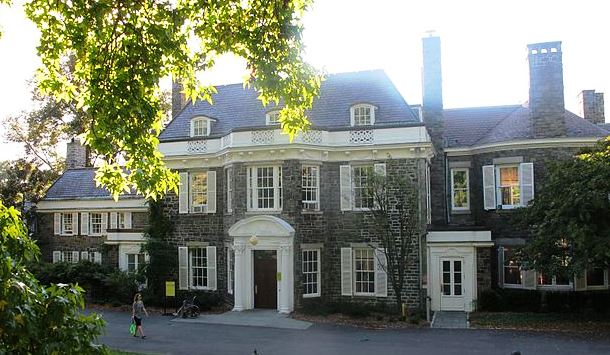
Wave Hill House

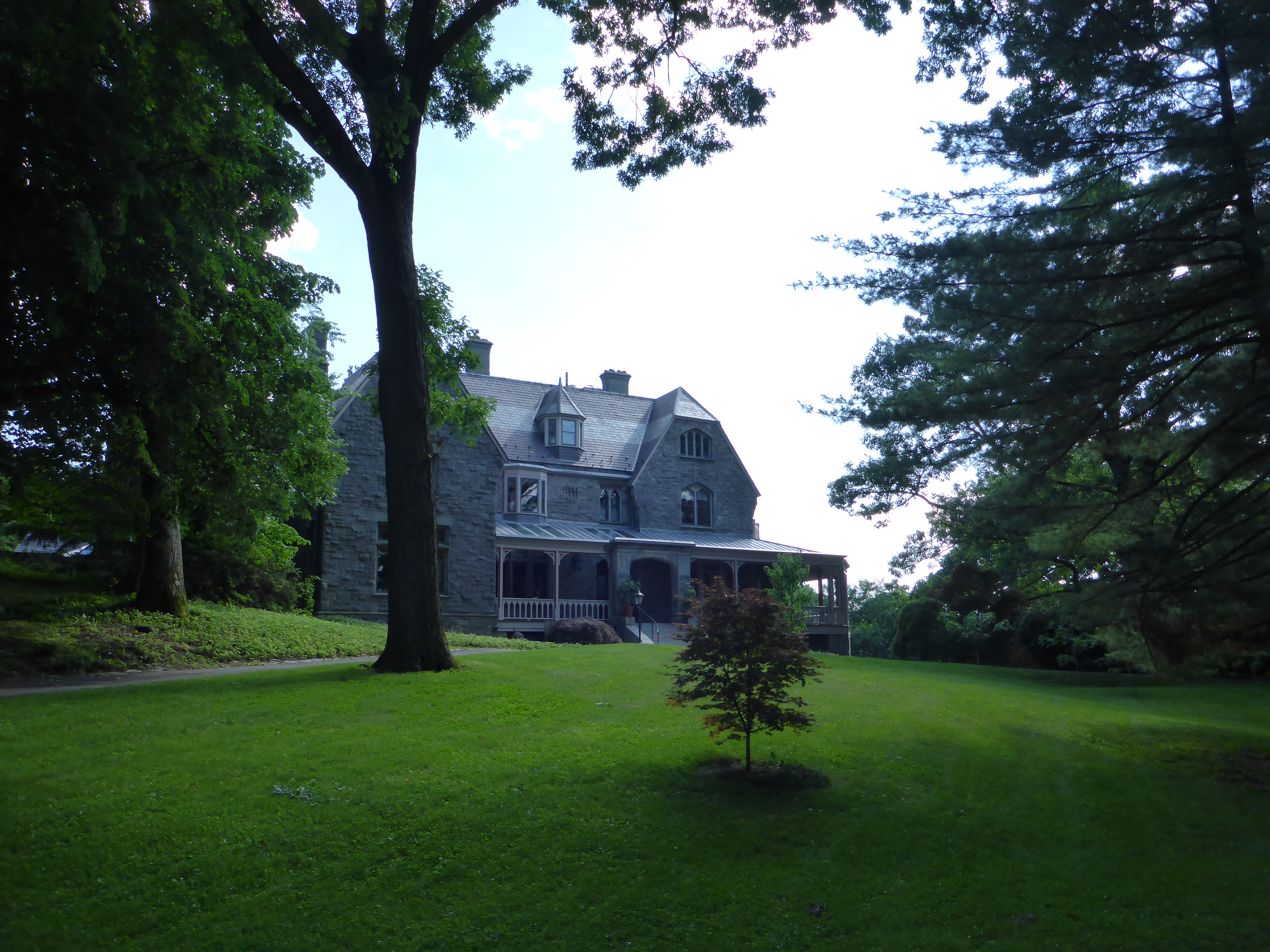
William Dodge House (Greyston)

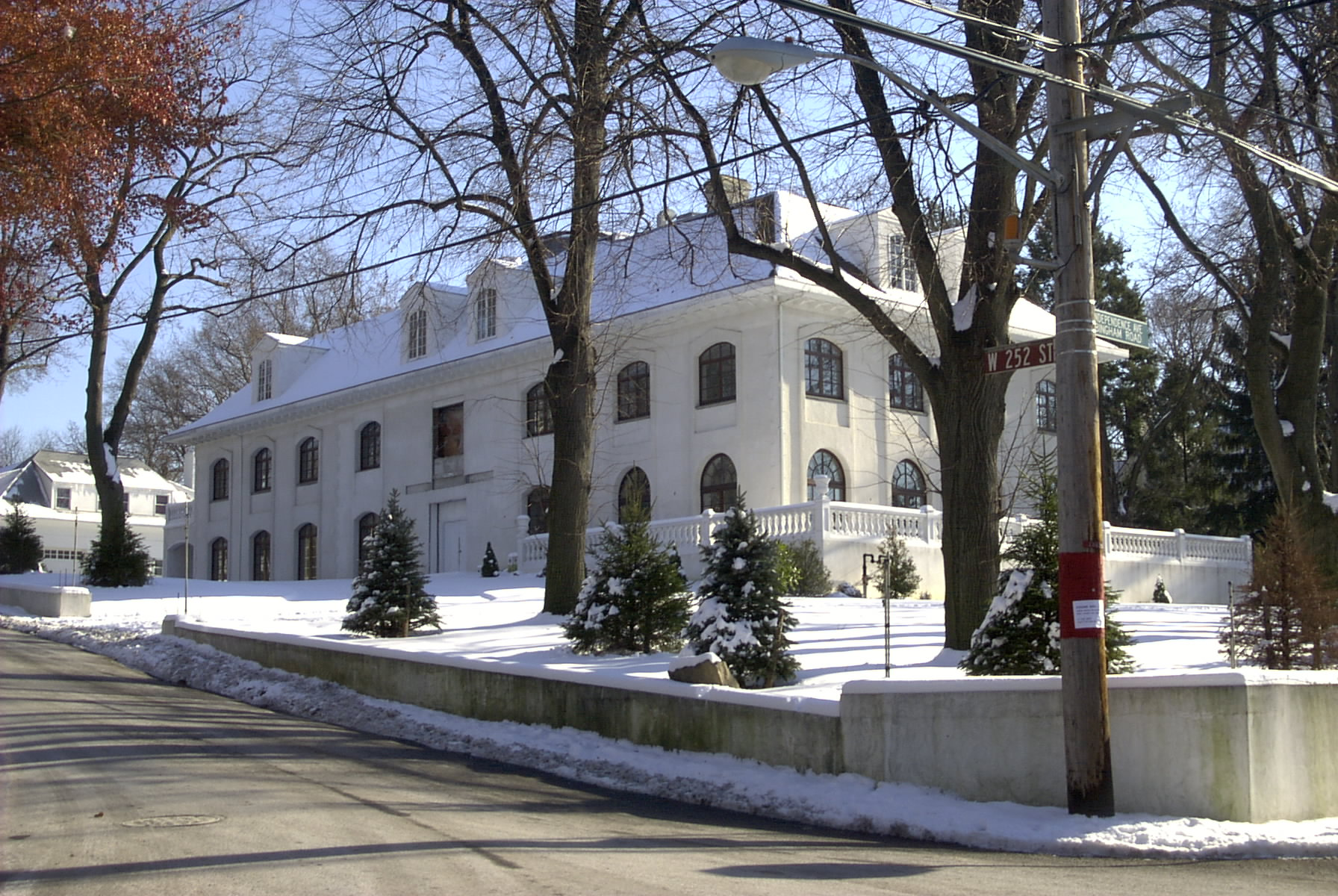
5040 Independence Ave., a childhood home of John F. Kennedy (1927–1929)
