= Kingsbridge Heights Community Center =

Settlement house in the Bronx, New York

Coordinates: 40°52′39.5″N 73°54′2.5″W

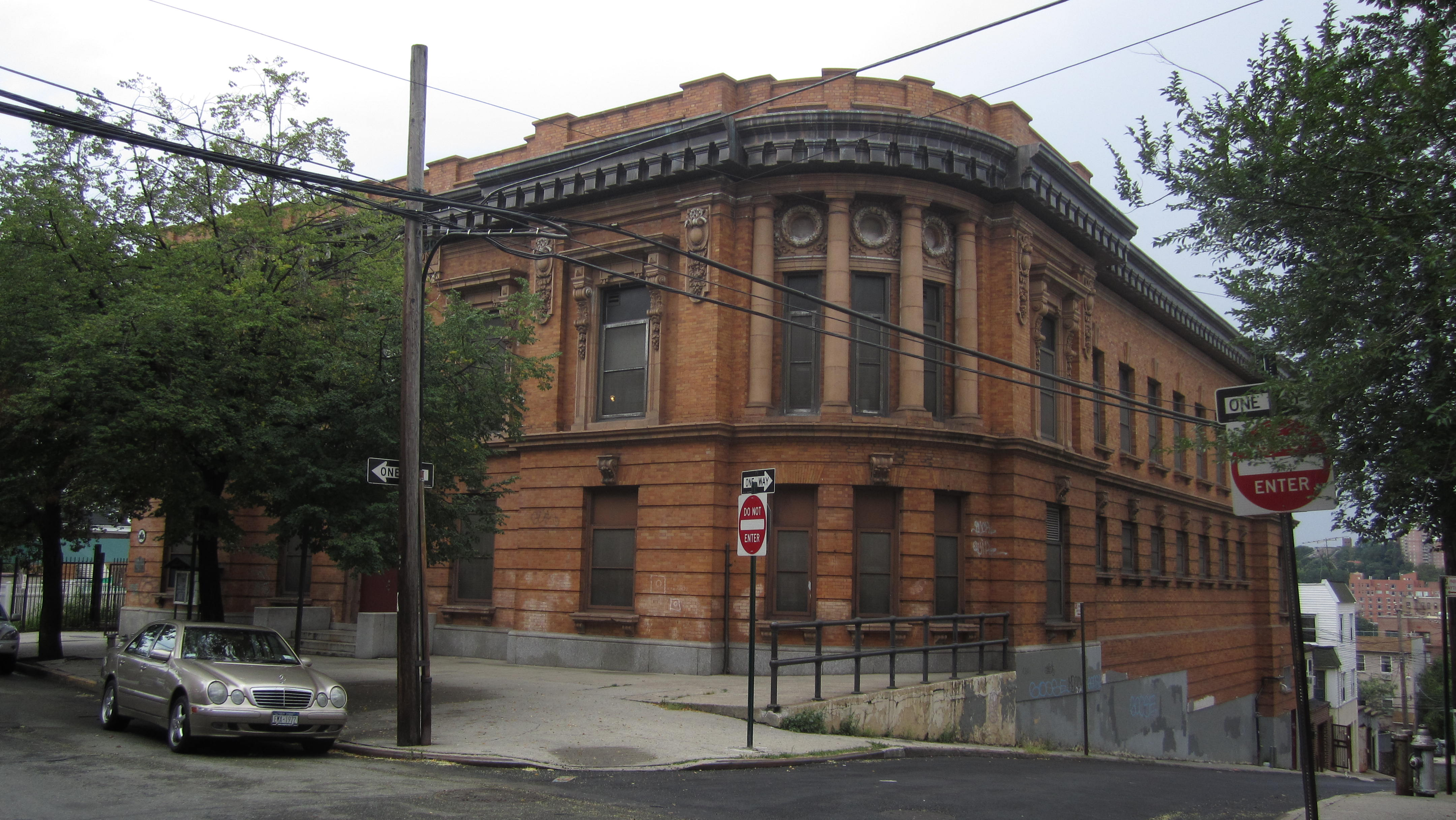
- Year Founded: 1974
- Number of Programs: 13
- Participants served: 4500+ annually
- Purpose: Endow individuals to effect change and improve the quality of their own lives, their families, and their community
- Headquarters: 3101 Kingsbridge Terrace, Bronx, NY
- Website: Official Website

Kingsbridge Heights Community Center (KHCC) is a settlement house founded in 1974 by community activists Janet Athanasidy, Patricia Burns, and Mary McLoughlin, serving the Kingsbridge Heights neighborhood and the Bronx. KHCC offers programs and services in multiple sites for more than 4,500 people annually. Guided by the settlement house model of community development and involvement, KHCC is a member of United Neighborhood Houses of New York City. KHCC’s mission is to “empower Bronx residents from cradle to career to advance education and well-being for a vibrant community. ”

KHCC serves low- and moderate-income residents, providing a variety of programs for all age groups. Programs include early childhood education, college preparation, school-age after school and teen evening programs; counseling services to families, adults and senior citizens; and respite services for developmentally-disabled youth and adults. Some of these programs serve the entire borough of the Bronx, including the Child Sexual Abuse Treatment and Prevention, and College Directions Program.

The Center’s main office is located in the former 50th Precinct Police Station House, (originally the 40th Precinct Police Station House), 3101 Kingsbridge Terrace, Bronx, built by architects Arthur J. Hogan and Vincent J. Slattery in 1902. The building was designated a New York City landmark in 1986.

== History ==
The former 50th Precinct Police Station House is an example of Beaux-Arts classicism, an architectural style typical for public architecture at the turn-of-the-century that became the emblem of the City Beautiful Movement. Its style, scale, materials of construction, direct relation to the street, and ornament contribute to the monumental character, which distinguishes the building from the surrounding structures.

Upon hearing in 1972 that the 50th Precinct was moving out of its building, Mary MacLoughlin began a three-year writing campaign to convince City Hall to give the building to the community to realize her vision of a community center modeled after the New York settlement houses, providing educational and cultural activities for all community residents. Through the support of then-Assemblyman Oliver Koppell, Bronx Borough President Robert Abrams, community residents Patricia Burns and Janet Athanasidy, as well as other community activists, the building was secured on Dec. 27, 1974.

The center opened during the spring of 1975 with a teen program and a Head Start Program and a budget of $500,000 to continue renovating the facility. In 1979, with funding from the New York City Capital Budget and the Federal Community Development Budget, the community center embarked on a major rehabilitative program which was completed in 1981. During the 1980s, the agency added services to prevent and treat child abuse and neglect, adult education, and expanded youth programs. In 1991 it opened College Directions, one of the first community-based college access programs in the city, and in 1997 added Early Head Start services. The center was led by the executive director Charles Shayne between 1985 and 2010 who built the Center into one of the leading service agencies in the Bronx, adding new programs, new buildings, and new supporters, as well as founding and coordinating the Bronx Cluster of Settlement Houses with eight other agencies. Upon his retirement, Giselle Melendez-Susca was promoted as the new Executive Director.

Today, KHCC provides thousands of Bronx residents with services ranging from prenatal care to senior services and is an active member of United Neighborhood Houses of New York City and United Neighborhood Centers of America. In August 2013, KHCC was awarded a $1.9 million grant by the City of New York for the construction of a new building to expand its facilities due to growing demand for early childhood, abuse and special needs programs. The new facility will allow 200 additional families to get services, and will accommodate both autistic children and young adults.

On July 27, 2013, Supreme Court Justice Sonia Sotomayor joined the children from the KHCC in a workshop hosted by the Bronx Children's Museum and GrowNYC.org. as part of the museum's Dream Big program.

== Services ==
Services provided by Kingsbridge Heights Community Center include the following programs:

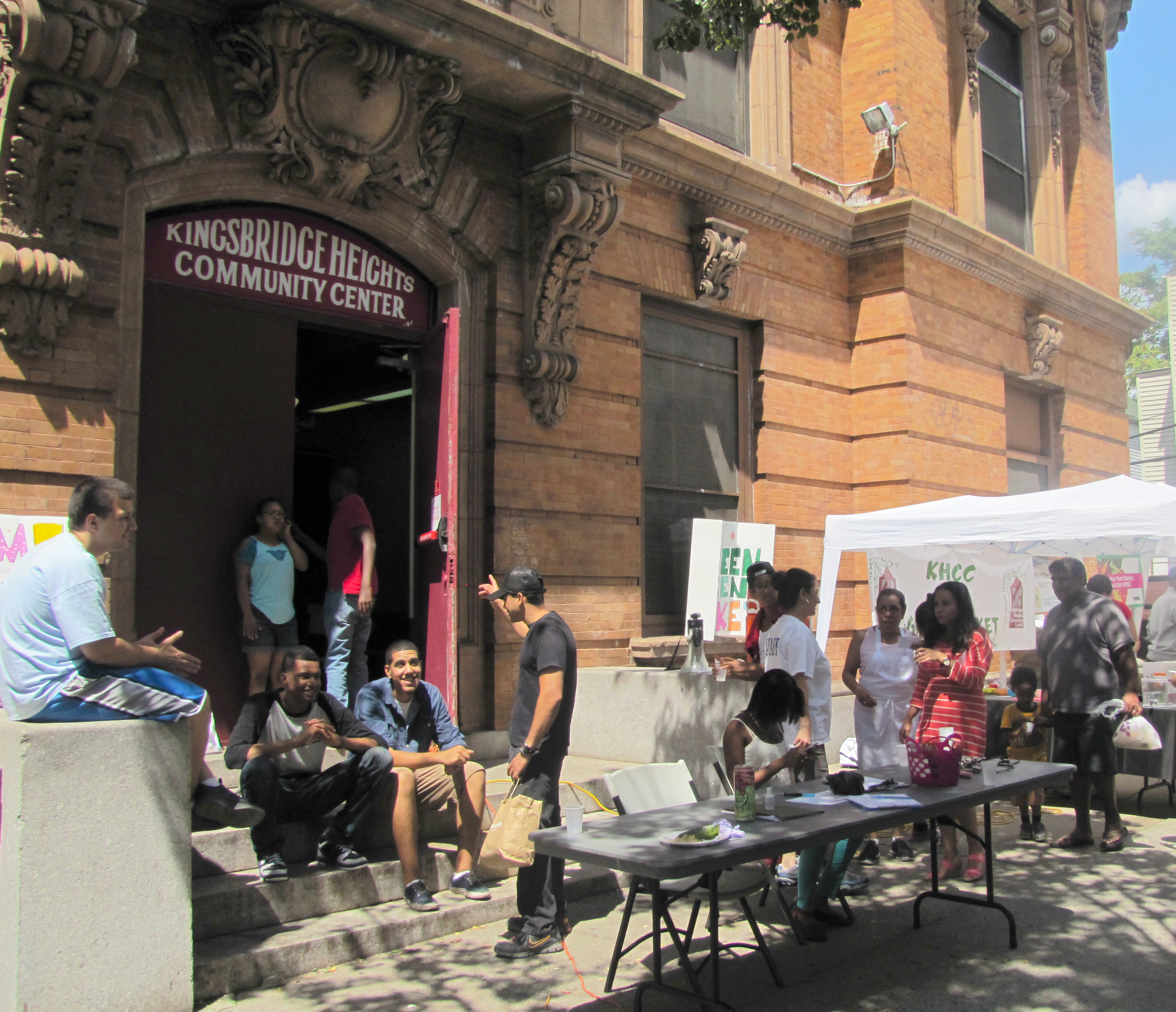
A Teen Green Market in front of the center

Head Start is designed to provide support to families of preschoolers to enhance the child’s development through building of educational skills, social emotional development and school readiness goals.

The center also offers the Early Head Start program serving families and children from pregnancy through the three years of age. Parents and children can participate in the three program options offered: Combination Program Option, Family Child Care Option or the Pregnancy Option. The Head Start and Early Head Start programs served 114 and 163 families respectively in 2012.

Teen Center is open to youth between the ages of 11 and 21. The Tween Program offers activities tailored to the age group of youth in grades 6 to 8. A farmer’s market run completely by teens from the community is also organized by the center to promote a healthy lifestyle and reduce obesity as a part of the New York City Departments of Health & Mental Hygiene and Transportation Play Street initiative, which offers a wide range of health and arts activities for Bronx families.

College Directions works to increase the number of Bronx youth who are well-informed about the benefits of a college education and to support them as they move through the application process and into college. The majority of its participants are from low-income households and many are first-generation college students. The program assists college applicants every step of the way, from searching to scholarships to writing the application essay. The program helps students explore career options, prepare for the SAT, and offers one-on-one guidance.

Special Needs Program provides environment and structured opportunities for learning, growth, and socializing with peers for children and adults with developmental or intellectual disability, autism, or down syndrome.

The Special Needs After School Program offers young people between 5 and 21 years of age homework help, tutoring, adaptive physical education and other services. Saturday and Sunday programs serve people up to age 25 through participation in recreational trips to community venues.

Child Sexual Abuse Treatment and Prevention Program provides free treatment to children in the Bronx, ages 3 to 21. Services include therapy, workshops and trainings, and advocacy. The center also offers individual therapy and group therapy to adult survivors of child sexual abuse and other types of trauma. In 2013, KHCC produced LISTEN TO ME: stories of child sexual abuse survivors and those who help them in collaboration with Ping Chong + Company as part of its Secret Survivors National Initiative. In the 40 minute production therapists from KHCC share their own stories, as well as give voice to the experiences of child survivors who have gone through KHCC’s child sexual abuse prevention and treatment program.

ESL and Citizenship courses: the center offers English as a second language classes and workshops focusing on citizenship, immigrant rights and financial literacy. In addition, the center offers free tax filing for families in need.
