= Yeshiva of Telshe Alumni =

School in New York City, United States

Coordinates: 40°53′48″N 73°54′40″W

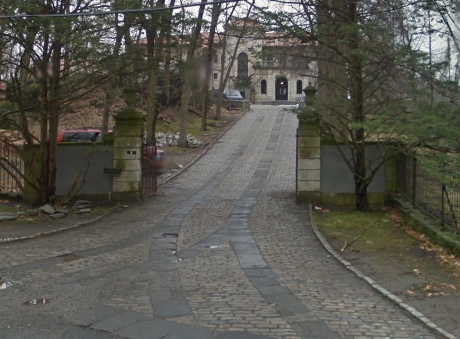
- The driveway to Yeshiva of Telshe Alumni in Hudson Hill
- Hudson Hill; Riverdale, The Bronx, New York; United States

Information
- Denomination: Orthodox Judaism
- Established: c. 1980
- Founders: Rabbi Avrohom Ausband; Rabbi Yaakov Reisman; Rabbi Yosef Chaim Libersohn
- Rosh yeshiva: Rabbi Eliyahu Ausband
- Enrollment: Approxiamtely 200
- Website: yeshivatelshealumni.com

Yeshiva of Telshe Alumni (or Telshe Riverdale) is a Yeshiva located in the Hudson Hill section of Riverdale, in The Bronx, New York. It was founded in the early 1980s by Rabbi Avrohom Ausband, (a grandson of Rabbi Avraham Yitzchak Bloch), Rabbi Yaakov Reisman The Yeshiva, headed by Rabbi Ausband until his death in 2024, has an enrollment of approximately two hundred.

== Learning style ==
The method of Talmudic study at the Yeshiva is based on the Rabbi Boruch Ber Lebowitz style of the Brisker method, which is known for its hair-splitting "chilukim" (conceptual Talmudic distinctions) that are often hard to grasp unless one dwells on them for many hours. This style of learning can potentially greatly limit the number of blatt in the Talmud that will be studied during each semester. The Rosh Yeshiva, referred to as Rebbi by his students, delivered a daily Gemara Shiur, with a follow-up Shiur, called huddle by the students, after evening services.

== Magidei shiur ==
- Rabbi Fromowitz - 9th Grade Maggid Shiur.
- Rabbi Pinchos Kraus - 10th Grade Maggid Shiur.
- Rabbi Yeruchom Ausband, (Rabbi Avrohom Ausband's son) - 11th Grade Maggid Shiur.
- Rabbi Moshe Chaim Frey - 12th Grade Maggid Shiur.
- Rabbi Yudel Fischer - 1st Year Bais Medrash Maggid Shiur.
- Rabbi Eliyahu Ausband (The Rosh Yeshiva) - 2nd Year and up Maggid Shiur
