= Henry F. Spaulding Coachman's House =

Historic house in the Bronx, New York

- U.S. National Register of Historic Places
- New York City Landmark
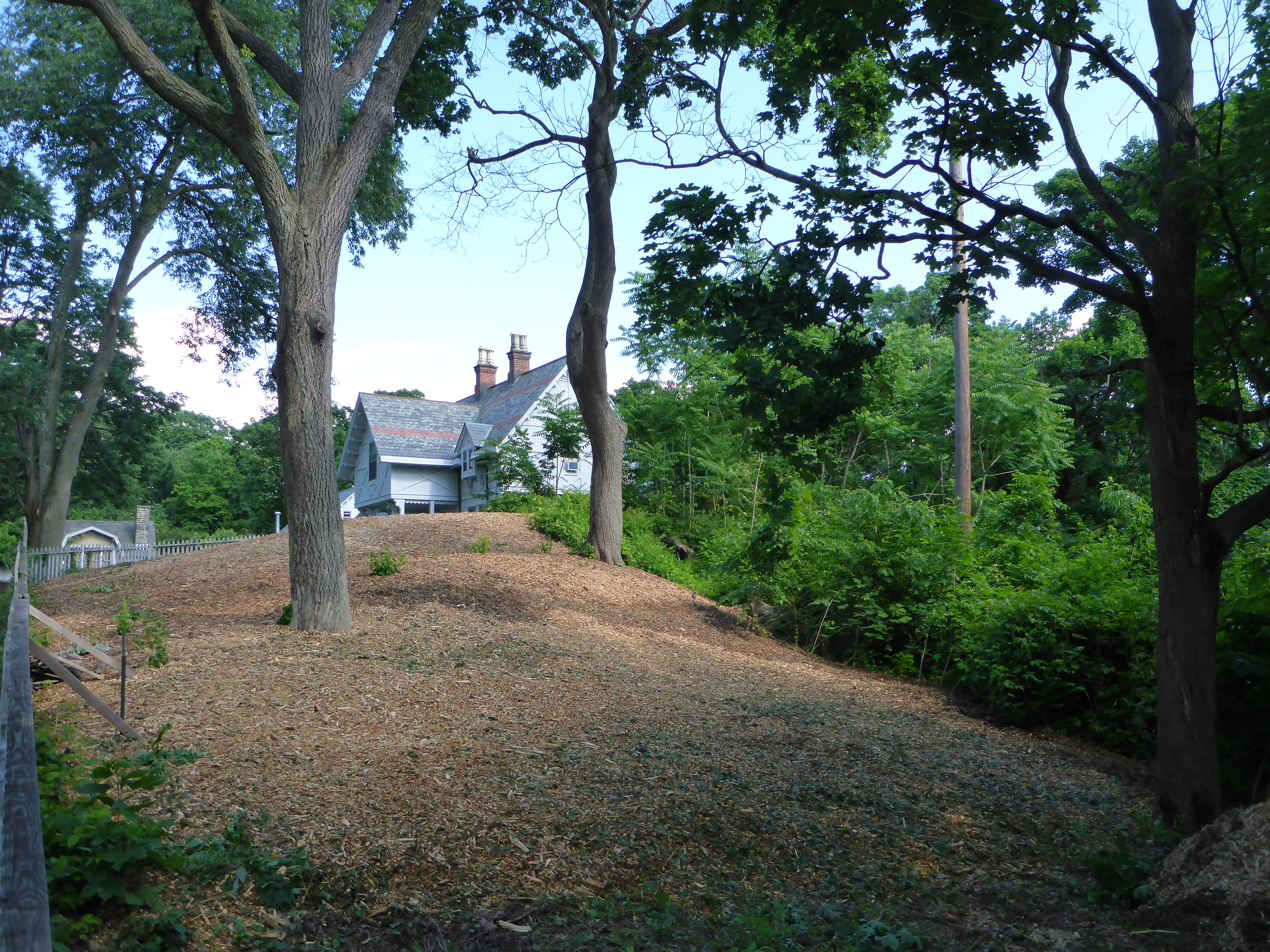
- Henry F. Spaulding Coachman's House, June 2013
- Location: 4970 Independence Ave., New York, New York
- Coordinates: 40°53′53″N 73°54′41″W
- Area: less than one acre
- Built: 1880
- Architect: Clinton, Charles W.
- Architectural style: Stick/Eastlake
- NRHP reference No.: 82001093
- NYCL No.: 1083

Significant dates
- Added to NRHP: November 4, 1982
- Designated NYCL: July 28, 1981

Henry F. Spaulding Coachman's House is a historic home at 4970 Independence Avenue in Riverdale, Bronx, New York City. It was built about 1880 and is representative of the Stick-Eastlake style. The main section is a 2 1/2-story cottage dwelling with board and batten siding. It features jigsaw ornament, twin chimneys, and a polychromed slate roof.

The house, originally located in Wave Hill across the street, was moved to its present location in 1909. It was listed on the National Register of Historic Places in 1982.
