= Lists of New York City landmarks =

These are lists of New York City landmarks designated by the New York City Landmarks Preservation Commission:

- List of New York City Designated Landmarks in Manhattan:
  - List of New York City Designated Landmarks in Manhattan below 14th Street
  - List of New York City Designated Landmarks in Manhattan from 14th to 59th Streets
  - List of New York City Designated Landmarks in Manhattan from 59th to 110th Streets
  - List of New York City Designated Landmarks in Manhattan above 110th Street
  - List of New York City Designated Landmarks in Manhattan on smaller islands
- List of New York City Designated Landmarks in Brooklyn
- List of New York City Designated Landmarks in Queens
- List of New York City Designated Landmarks in the Bronx
- List of New York City Designated Landmarks in Staten Island
- New York City scenic landmarks, split across several boroughs

== See also ==
- List of National Historic Landmarks in New York City
- National Register of Historic Places listings in Manhattan
  - National Register of Historic Places listings in Manhattan below 14th Street
  - National Register of Historic Places listings in Manhattan from 14th to 59th Streets
  - National Register of Historic Places listings in Manhattan from 59th to 110th Streets
  - National Register of Historic Places listings in Manhattan above 110th Street
  - National Register of Historic Places listings in Manhattan on islands
- National Register of Historic Places listings in the Bronx
- National Register of Historic Places listings in Brooklyn
- National Register of Historic Places listings in Queens, New York
- National Register of Historic Places listings in Staten Island
