= 175 Belden Street =

Historic house in the Bronx, New York

- House at 175 Belden Street
- U.S. National Register of Historic Places
- New York City Landmark
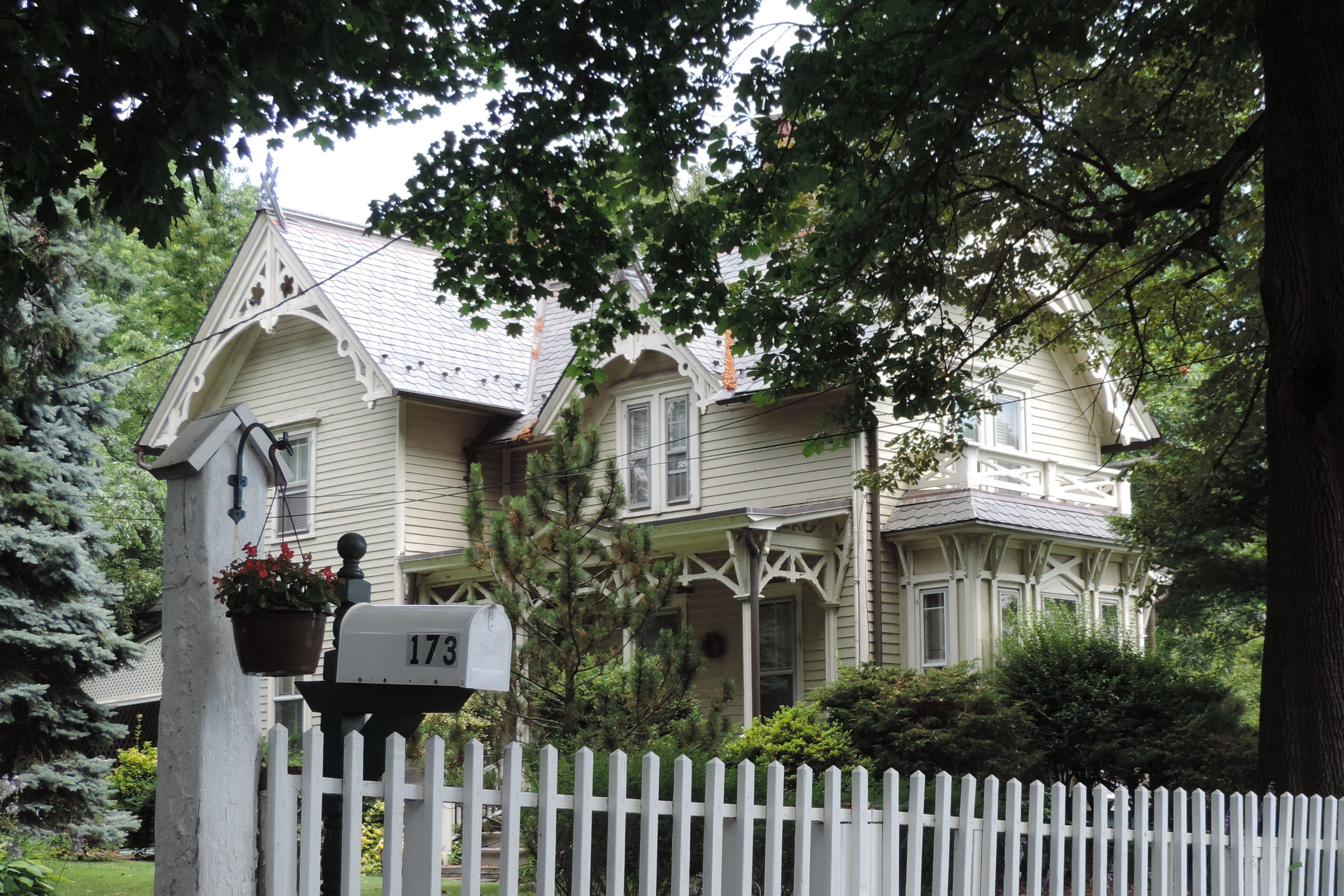

- Location within New York City Location within New York Location within the United States
- Location: 175 Belden St., Bronx, New York
- Coordinates: 40°50′17″N 73°46′57″W
- Area: less than one acre
- Built: 1880
- Architectural style: Cottage
- NRHP reference No.: 82003345
- NYCL No.: 1082

Significant dates
- Added to NRHP: June 3, 1982
- Designated NYCL: July 28, 1981

The house at 175 Belden Street is a historic home located on City Island in the Bronx in New York City. It was built about 1880 and is a simple, small picturesque cottage with an asymmetrical cruciform plan.

It was listed as a New York City Designated Landmark in 1981 and on the National Register of Historic Places in 1982.
