= Cothren =

Cothren is a surname. Notable people with the surname include:

- Marion Cothren (1880–1949), American activist, lawyer, and children's author
- Montgomery Morrison Cothren (1819–1888), American legislator and jurist
- Paige Cothren (1935–2016), American football player
