= Gould Memorial Library =

Building in the Bronx, New York

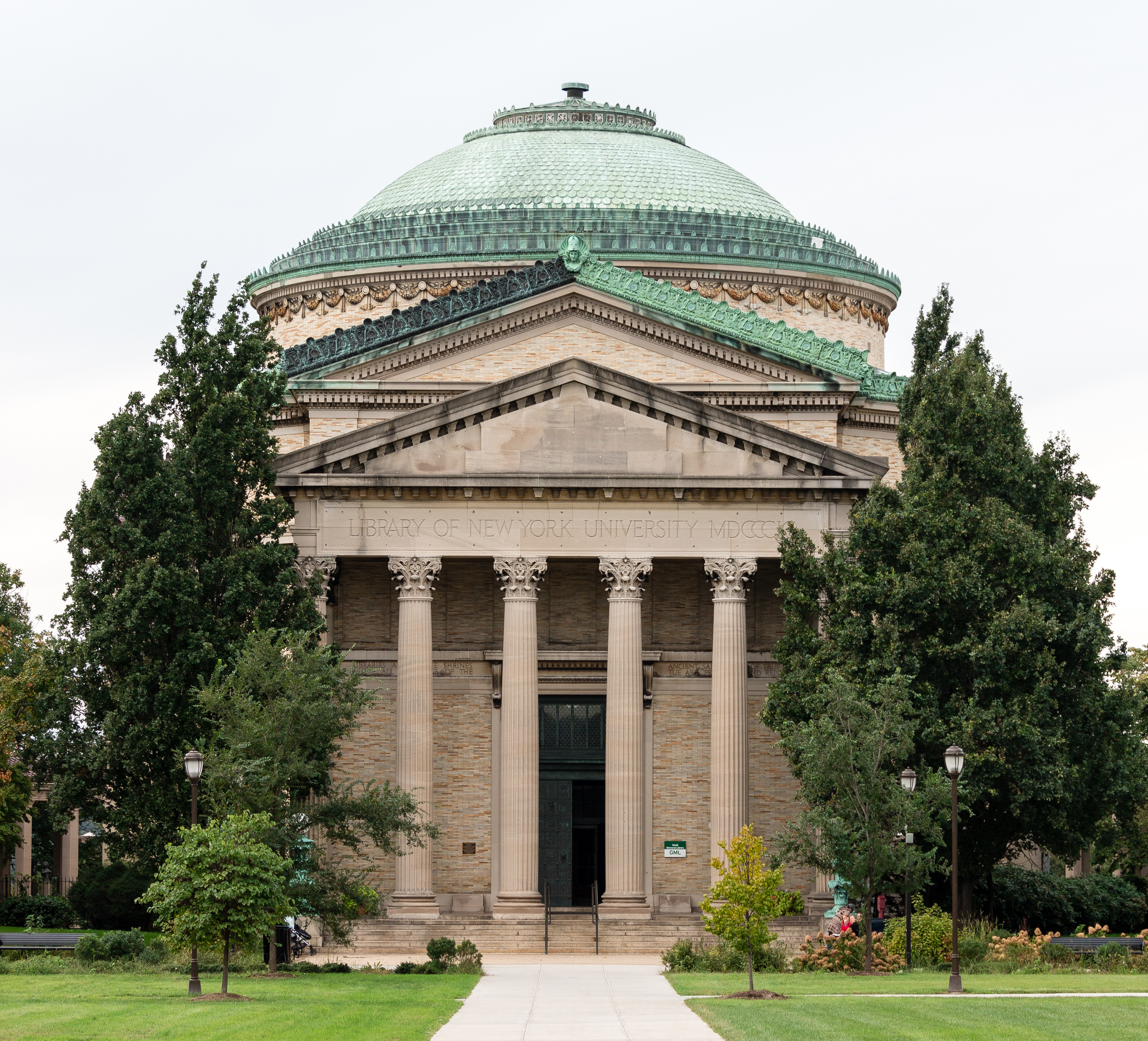

General information
- Type: Event space, former library
- Architectural style: Neoclassical
- Location: 1930 Sedgwick Avenue, The Bronx, New York City, United States
- Coordinates: 40°51′31.5″N 73°54′50.3″W
- Current tenants: Bronx Community College
- Named for: Jay Gould
- Groundbreaking: October 19, 1895
- Completed: 1900
- Closed: 1973 (as library)
- Client: New York University
- Owner: City University of New York

Technical details
- Structural system: Steel superstructure
- Material: Brick and limestone facade

Design and construction
- Architect: Stanford White

Other information
- Public transit: Subway: 4 train at Burnside Avenue; Metro-North: Hudson Line at University Heights

Website
- www.bcc.cuny.edu/about-bcc/history-architecture/gould-memorial-library/

U.S. National Register of Historic Places
- Designated: September 7, 1979
- Reference no.: 79001567
- Designated entity: Hall of Fame Complex

U.S. National Historic Landmark District – Contributing property
- Designated: October 16, 2012
- Reference no.: 12001013
- Designated entity: Bronx Community College Complex

New York City Landmark
- Designated: February 15, 1966
- Reference no.: 0112
- Designated entity: Facade

New York City Landmark
- Designated: August 11, 1981
- Reference no.: 1087
- Designated entity: Interior

The Gould Memorial Library (GML; also nicknamed Gould) is a building on the campus of Bronx Community College (BCC), an institution of the City University of New York (CUNY), in University Heights, Bronx, New York City, United States. The building was designed by Stanford White of the firm McKim, Mead & White. Constructed between 1895 and 1900 as the central library of New York University's (NYU) Bronx campus, it was part of the New York University Libraries system. The library is named after railroad magnate Jay Gould, whose daughter Helen Miller Shepard funded the project in his memory. Gould is no longer used as a library, instead serving primarily as an event space. Gould's facade and interior are New York City designated landmarks, and it is also listed on the National Register of Historic Places.

Gould is arranged in the shape of a Greek cross and is surrounded by the Hall of Fame for Great Americans to its west. The library's main entrance is on the east side, where there is a portico with a Corinthian-style colonnade. The copper dome contains an ornamental frieze as well as an oculus at its center. Inside the entrance vestibule, a barrel-vaulted stair hall leads up to offices and a circular reading room. The ornately designed reading room contains two colonnades flanking two balcony levels; multiple Tiffany glass windows; a balustrade with sixteen statues; and a coffered ceiling. Originally, the reading room was surrounded by three levels of stacks and 18 seminar rooms. Under the library was a 600-seat auditorium.

New York University's Bronx campus was developed in the 1890s. Construction on the library started in 1895 after Shepard anonymously donated $200,000. During much of the 20th century, NYU used the library for commencement ceremonies and other events. The university installed numerous busts of artists inside the library during the 1920s and 1930s. NYU built additional campus libraries in the 1950s due to a lack of space at Gould, and the auditorium was rebuilt after an arson attack in 1969. After NYU sold its Bronx campus to CUNY in 1973, the Gould Library was converted into an event space, and the library fell into disrepair. The auditorium was restored in 2000, and the library was further refurbished in the early 21st century.

== Site ==
The Gould Memorial Library is on a high plateau in the University Heights neighborhood of the Bronx in New York City. The plateau is 170 ft (52 m) above sea level and overlooks the Harlem River immediately to the west. When Gould was built, the plateau had views of the Palisades to the west, Spuyten Duyvil to the north, Long Island to the east, and the South Bronx to the south. The modern site overlooks the Major Deegan Expressway, the Metro-North Railroad's Hudson Line, and the Harlem River to the west. Gould was originally part of New York University's (NYU) campus. Since 1973, Gould has been part of Bronx Community College (BCC), operated by the City University of New York (CUNY). The library occupies a land lot whose official address is 1930 Sedgwick Avenue.

The library is flanked by the Hall of Languages to the south and the Hall of Philosophy to the north. The three buildings are placed at the top of the plateau. The building is about 30 ft (9.1 m) above Sedgwick Avenue, which runs directly to the west. The Hall of Fame for Great Americans runs to the west of the Gould Memorial Library, Hall of Languages, and Hall of Philosophy. The Hall of Fame, composed of a 630 ft-long (190 m) stone colonnade as well as a brick walkway, contains bronze portrait busts of prominent Americans. The Hall of Fame was designed to conceal the Gould Memorial Library's foundation. The portion of the colonnade next to the library is circular in plan. West of the Hall of Fame is a fountain facing Sedgwick Avenue. To the east, a promenade cuts across BCC's quad. The promenade originally extended to Ohio Field, but a student center was built between the library and Ohio Field in 1953.

== Architecture ==
The Gould Memorial Library was designed by Stanford White of McKim, Mead & White and was built between 1895 and 1898 as part of the New York University Libraries system. It was the centerpiece of NYU's Bronx campus. Since 1973, it has been part of the BCC campus. Gould no longer serves as the campus library; it has been superseded by the Bronx Community College Library, which opened in 2012.

=== Form and facade ===
The library is shaped like a Greek cross; this layout was also used for the Low Memorial Library, designed by White's colleague Charles Follen McKim. It measures four bays wide on each elevation. The corners of the building contain notches. To the north, west, and south are wings with pediments, each of which measures one bay deep and four bays across. The eastern elevation, facing the rest of the BCC campus, contains a portico with Corinthian columns. Each of the six columns in the portico is made of Indiana sandstone.

The library, as well as the adjacent buildings, are clad with buff brick and limestone trim. Pink granite and soft-red copper were also used in the building's construction. The main entrance to the library is underneath the portico to the east. It contains bronze entrance doors, which were designed in 1921 and sculpted by White's son, Lawrence Grant White. The doors, consisting of eight relief panels, were designed by six sculptors who had worked with Stanford White. (Note: Andrew O'Connor, Philip Martiny, Herbert Adams, Adolph Weinman, Ulysses Ricci, and Janet Scudder designed the doors.) The remaining three elevations are made of Roman red brick, framed with pilasters made of limestone. The brick walls contain windows. Each of the windows is flanked by molded jambs and topped by entablatures. Above the building is a Composite-style cornice with antefixes.

The top of the library contains a circular drum, above which is a saucer dome with an oculus at its center. There is also a composite frieze on the dome, decorated with garlands and pendants. The dome is covered with copper tiles. The lower section of the dome is divided into several stepped tiers. Surrounding the oculus are decorations such as antefixes. Several authors have likened the arrangement of the building, with its dome and porticoes, to the University of Virginia's Rotunda.

=== Interior ===
==== Vestibule and stairs ====
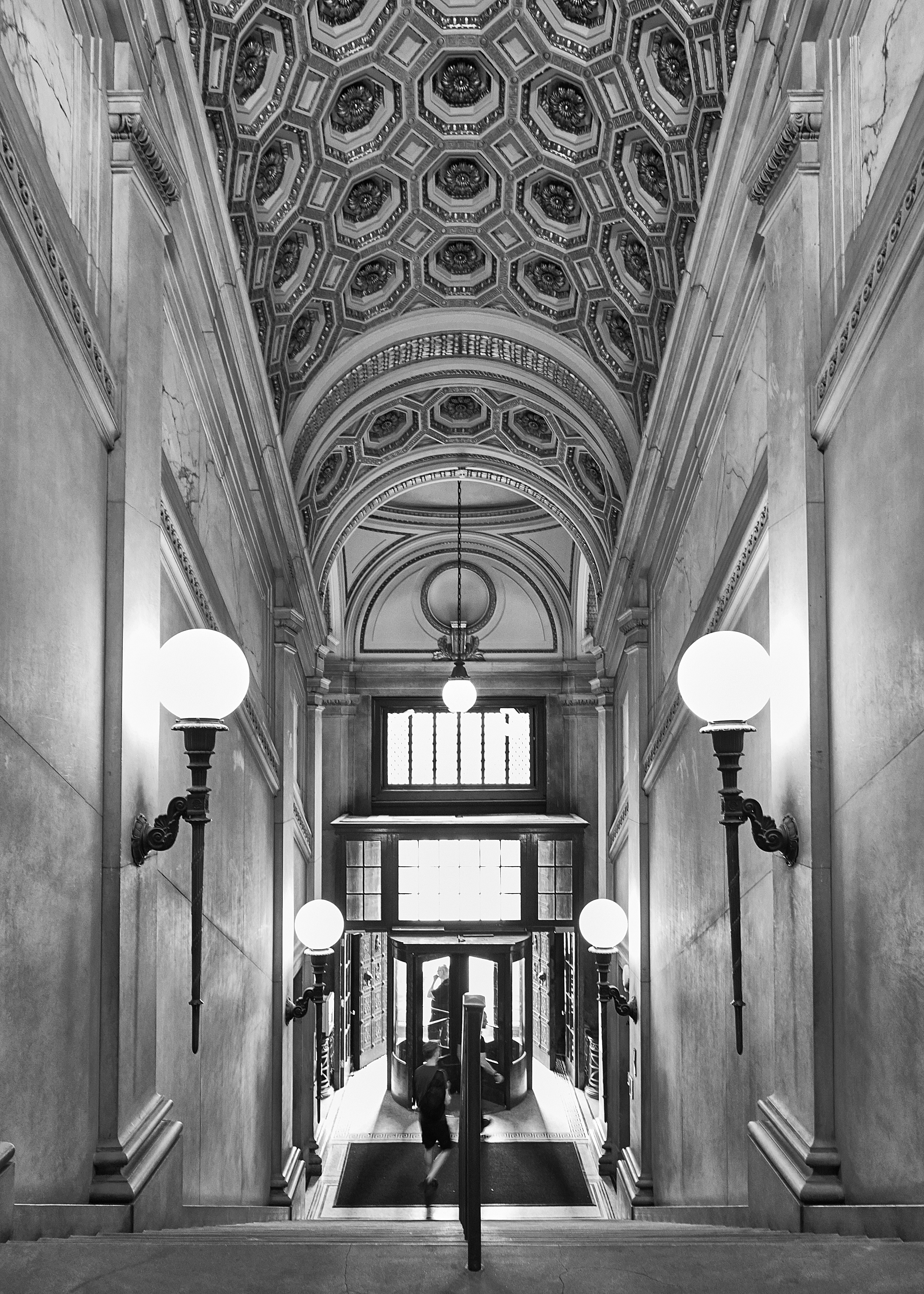
View down the main staircase, looking from the reading room toward the entrance vestibule

Just inside the doors is a vestibule with bronze lamps on either side. The vestibule is decorated with stained-glass windows; a mosaic floor with red, yellow, white and black tiles; and a domed ceiling. There is a revolving door just inside the vestibule, which leads to a landing with a mosaic floor and wooden office doors. The side walls contain barrel-vaulted staircases descending to the basement. One of these staircases led to the auditorium. This stairway contained six marble panels with the inscription "The fear of the Lord is the beginning of Wisdom" in Hebrew, Greek, Latin, French, English, and German.

A main staircase with 24 Tennessee marble steps ascends from the lower landing to the reading room. The main staircase is placed inside a stair hall with a barrel-vaulted, coffered ceiling. The design of the main staircase was inspired by a sketch that White had created in his youth. Inspiration was also derived from the Golden Staircase in the Doge's Palace and the Scala Regia in the Apostolic Palace. The staircase was designed to resemble an ascent toward knowledge, as the domed reading room could not be seen until a visitor reached the top of the staircase. Each of the steps is 12 ft (3.7 m) wide. The walls of the stair hall are clad with Portland stone to about two-thirds of the stair hall's height. A frieze with a scroll pattern, as well as pale-yellow panels of marble, runs atop the Portland-stone section of the wall. Each wall contains two stone pilasters, one near the bottom of the staircase and one near the top. There are bronze torchères attached to both sets of pilasters, above which are glass orbs providing illumination to the stairway. The top of each wall contains an entablature, above which rises the ceiling.

The top of the stair hall contains an upper landing with a domed ceiling, similar in design to the lower landing. A green roundel of Tiffany glass is placed within the middle of the dome, and a glass lighting orb is suspended from this roundel. The walls of the upper landing are similar to those in the stair hall: Portland stone on the lower two-thirds of the wall and pale-yellow marble panels above. Directly in front of the stair hall is a doorway with an eared frame and a triangular pediment, which leads directly into the reading room. In addition, each side wall contains doorways to NYU's former administrative offices. The librarian's room is to the left while the chancellor's room is to the right. Above all these doorways are lunette openings with niches, each of which is large enough to fit a bust.

==== Reading room ====
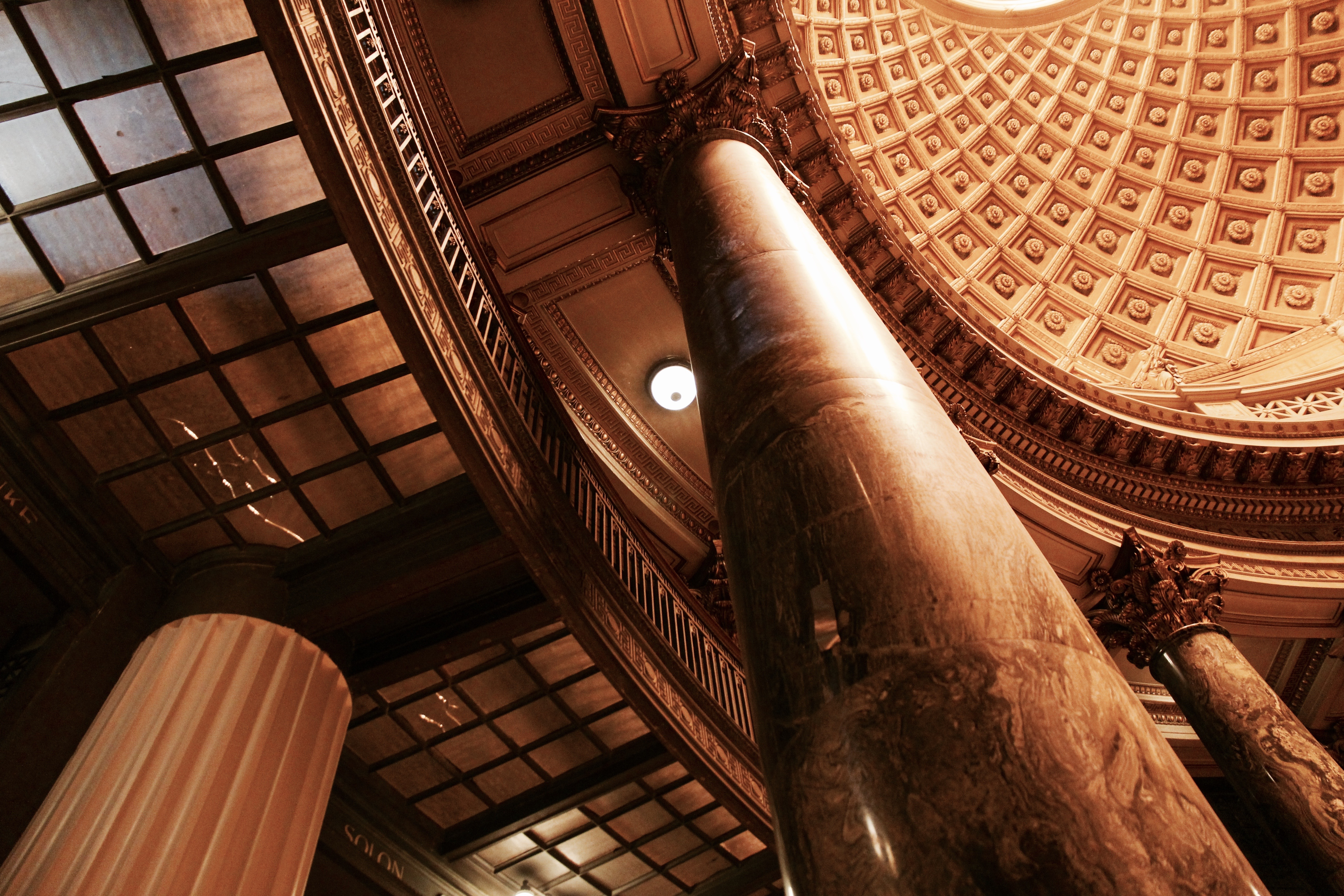
View of the upper balcony (left) and dome (right)

The circular reading room was designed as the centerpiece of the library and was surrounded by three levels of stacks. The outer wall of the reading room contains a colonnade of 16 triple-height engaged and fluted Corinthian columns. It is aligned with an inner colonnade of freestanding green Connemara marble columns. The colonnades flank a passageway with a floor of white, black, and yellow marble tiles; the passageway measures about 5 ft (1.5 m) wide. A skylight in the middle of the ground floor, measuring 15 ft (4.6 m) across, illuminates the former auditorium in the basement. There are three balconies immediately above the passageway. The second-level balcony has an iron frame and a glass floor. The third-level balcony was decorated more ornately. Above the colonnades is a fourth-level balcony and the dome.

===== First to third levels =====
On the reading room's north, west, and south walls were alcoves with stacks, as well as doorways leading to seminar rooms and staircases. Each of the alcoves contained three tiers of stacks, each measuring 7.5 ft (2.3 m) tall. The alcoves were all divided vertically into three bays. On the first level, the outer bays of each alcove contained bookcases, while the central bay contained a swinging bookcase that doubled as a doorway. The names of academics and other intellectual figures are inscribed onto the walls of the reading room, above and below the bookcases. The second and third levels contained iron bookcases, gilded doors, and inscriptions similar to those on the first level. Above the stacks on the third level are red, green, and blue Tiffany glass panels.

The reading room's entrance was flanked by card catalog desks. The loan desk was in the second alcove, counting clockwise from the main entrance (on the patron's left when they entered). The loan desk contained an inscription of a Latin phrase. (Note: The phrase, "Multoque satius est paucis te autoribus tradere quam per multos errare", roughly translates to "It is much better to give yourself over to a few authors than to wander about over many".) White designed furniture for the reading room, which is no longer extant. The furniture was designed for a practical purpose; for example, the legs of the chairs and tables had rubber tips to prevent screeching. The center of the room contained a circular table surrounded by twenty-four seats. Radiating from the center were eight long and eight short tables; the short tables seated four people, and the long tables seated eight people. This gave the reading room a seating capacity of 120.

The Connemara-marble inner colonnade surrounds the central section of the reading room, which is 54 ft 3 in (16.54 m) across. Each of the columns has a diameter of 3 ft 5 in (1.04 m). Between each set of columns were glazed cases for large books or portfolios. The columns were constructed in six sections and are placed atop white Vermont-marble pedestals. The tops of the columns have metal Corinthian capitals, painted by the Tiffany Glass and Decorating Co. in a gold color. These columns support an entablature and a balcony. The entablature contains a frieze with an inscription in all capital letters, (Note: The inscription is divided into the following 16 sections: And Chiefly; Thou Spirit; That Dost; Prefer Before; All Temples; The Upright; Heart and; Pure Instruct; Me For; Thou Knowest; What In; Me Is; Dark Illumine; What Is; Low Raise; And Support) which is derived from book 1 of John Milton's poem Paradise Lost. There is an architrave with Greek frets beneath the inscription, as well as a cornice with brackets above.

===== Fourth level and dome =====
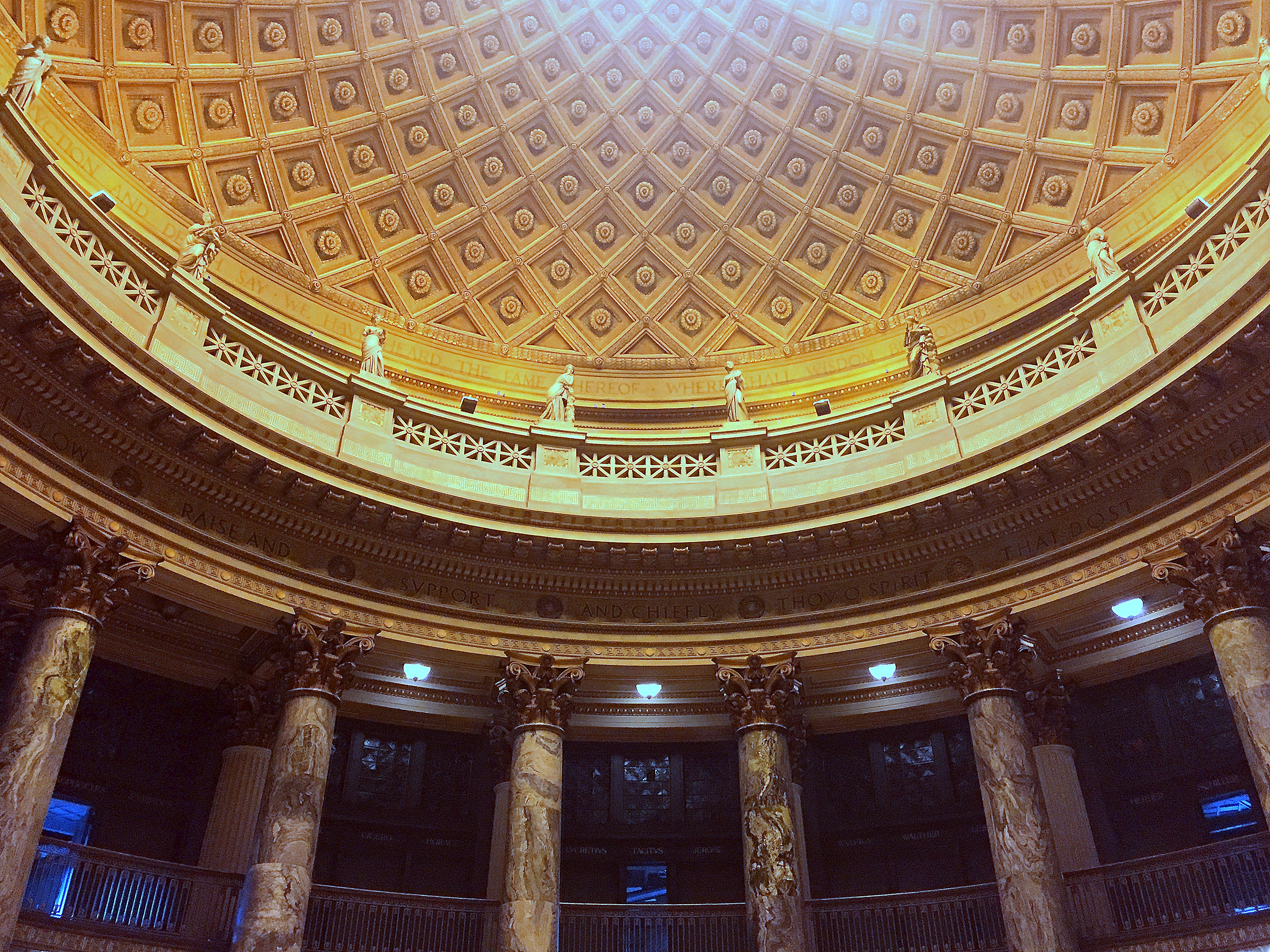
View of the columns and ceiling

The balcony on the fourth level, above the colonnades, contains a plaster balustrade with openwork motifs, interrupted by 16 plaster pedestals with Tiffany glass mosaics. Atop these pedestals are plaster statues of female figures. The statues may represent four Greek figures related to learning: Polyhymnia (muse of sacred poetry), Calliope (muse of epic poetry), Mnemosyne (goddess of memory), and Urania (muse of astronomy). There are bookcases on the outer walls of the balcony, within the dome's drum. Another inscription in all capital letters, from the Book of Job, is placed above the drum and just beneath the dome. (Note: The inscription is "But Where Shall Wisdom Be Found and Where Is the Place of Understanding Man Knoweth Not the Place Thereof Neither Is It Found in the Land of the Living the Depth Saith It Is Not in Me and the Sea Saith It Is Not With Me Destruction and Death Say We Have Heard the Fame Thereof".)

The dome is made of plaster and is divided into coffers, each with a rosette at its center. The coffers become progressively smaller near the highest point of the dome, above the middle of the room. The center of the dome originally contained a Tiffany-glass skylight, which has since been sealed. The skylight measured 23 ft (7.0 m) across. The top of the dome is either 70 ft (21 m) or 73 ft (22 m) above the main floor of the reading room.

==== Other spaces ====
Adjacent to the reading room were 18 seminar rooms, each of which was connected to a set of stacks. Each seminar room measured 18 by 14 ft (5.5 by 4.3 m) and contained two tables, which accommodated a total of four people. There were six seminar rooms on each of the first through third levels. The seminar rooms for the history and philosophy departments were on the first level. The language departments occupied the rooms on the second level. The seminar rooms for the various mathematics, sciences, engineering, and arts departments were on the third level. The library's holdings included a collection of 8,000 German-language books from an anonymous donor, as well as 3,000 Italian volumes from former NYU philosophy professor Vincenzo Botta.

NYU's administrative offices, just outside the upper landing of the main stairway, contained fireplaces and wood-paneled walls. The librarian's office contained white mahogany. The chancellor's room had an oiled maple floor, as well as San Domingo mahogany wainscoting. Above those were two cataloguing rooms on the second floor and the periodical and newspaper reading rooms on the third floor.

Under the reading room was a 600-seat auditorium, originally the Gould Library's chapel. When the library opened, the New-York Tribune said the auditorium could fit 400 people and a theatre organ on the stage. The seats were arranged in an amphitheater layout, surrounding a stage. In addition, there were 18 professors' offices around the stage. Science professors occupied eight offices directly behind the stage; history and philosophy professors occupied five offices on one side; and mathematics professors occupied five offices on the other side. The auditorium was designed so it could be converted into stacks if necessary. After the auditorium was damaged by arson in 1969, Marcel Breuer redesigned it in a brutalist style. Also in the basement were large fans, which generated warm air in winter and cool air in summer. The air was circulated throughout the building via flues on each story.

== History ==
What is now New York University (Note: NYU, a private college, was known as the University of the City of New York until 1896. It is not to be confused with the City University of New York, the city's public college system.) was founded in 1831; its original campus faced Washington Square Park in Manhattan. NYU was a small college with less than a hundred students for its first half-century. NYU's vice chancellor Henry MacCracken began looking for alternate sites in November 1890. The formerly residential area surrounding Washington Square Park had evolved into a commercial neighborhood by the late 19th century, and MacCracken believed the growth of commerce would stymie undergraduate education. MacCracken acquired the estate of H. W. T. Mali, on a bluff in the Bronx along the Harlem River, in May 1891. He became NYU's chancellor the next month, in large part due to his acquisition of the Mali estate. The original purchase covered 22 acres (8.9 ha) and was subsequently expanded several times.

=== Development ===
==== Planning ====
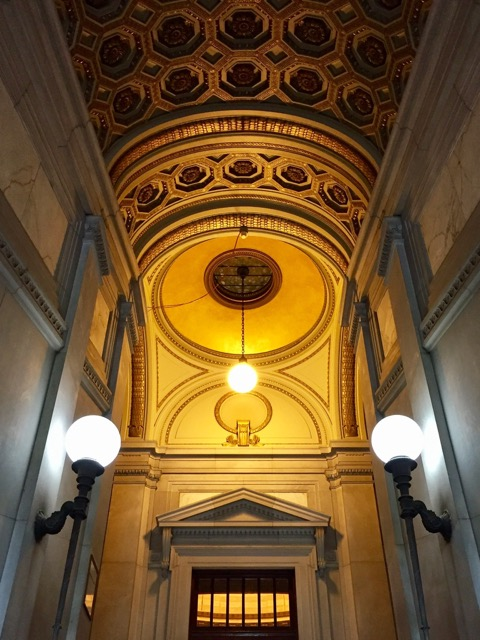
View up the main staircase, looking from the entrance vestibule toward the reading room

In January 1892, MacCracken wrote a letter to White, asking the architect if he would be interested in designing NYU's Bronx campus. White's involvement was largely based on the fact that his father, Richard Grant White, had attended NYU. White originally planned to relocate NYU's original building "stone by stone" to the Bronx. The relocated building would contain a museum, library, and chapel; the Mali mansion would contain classrooms. In addition, two new structures were to have been constructed. This plan was deemed infeasible, as it would cost about the same as five new buildings, so NYU instead asked White to design a completely new campus. The campus was to contain science, language, and philosophy halls; a library; a chapel; and dormitories, all arranged around a quadrangle. Around the same time, MacCracken began raising money for the new campus. One of the donors to the new campus was railroad magnate Jay Gould, who was willing to fund the new campus but died at the end of 1892.

White was formally hired to design NYU's new Bronx campus in November 1893, at the same time his partner Charles Follen McKim was hired to design the rival Columbia University campus in Morningside Heights, Manhattan. The banker Jacob Schiff had proposed that the two colleges merge, so he could give a large endowment to the combined colleges. Officials from both colleges ultimately rejected this proposal. By February 1894, White had outlined a plan for two classroom buildings flanking a domed central building. All structures would be made of yellow brick and limestone. The next month, the university sold its original building to fund the construction of the new Bronx campus. NYU's main campus at Washington Square continued to operate.

==== Funding and construction ====
Norcross Brothers began constructing the campus that April, and White was finalizing his plans for the library by the end of 1894. The first building on the new campus was the Hall of Languages, as that was the only structure for which funds had been procured. In May 1895, NYU received a $250,000 gift for the construction of the central building, which was to contain the library, museum, commencement hall, and administrative offices. The library would have capacity for a million books, while the commencement hall was to fit 1,000 students. The only stipulation of the gift was that the donor remain anonymous. The donor was Jay Gould's daughter Helen Miller Shepard, whose name was mentioned in the New-York Tribune in relation with a separate $20,000 gift for NYU's dormitories. Shepard was not publicly revealed as the donor until several years later, in December 1898. The library donation was part of $1.39 million in capital gifts that Shepard gave to NYU throughout her lifetime.

As the central building of the new NYU campus, the library had the largest budget; the remaining buildings had simpler designs due to a lack of funds. The library's budget was influenced by the design, whereas the opposite was typically true. After Shepard's donation, NYU's library committee wished to host an architectural design competition for the library, inviting White, Richard Morris Hunt, Henry Janeway Hardenbergh, and George B. Post. Hunt, Hardenbergh, and Post all declined to participate. MacCracken initially did not seem to like the plans for the domed reading room and asked White to create alternate plans, a request to which White took offense. Hunt, who was hired to mediate the resulting dispute, sided with White. In mid-1895, MacCracken wrote a letter to White, requesting that the library be recessed behind the Hall of Languages. A groundbreaking ceremony for the library occurred on October 19, 1895, upon the dedication of the Hall of Languages.

MacCracken continued to modify the design after the groundbreaking. In September 1896, he wrote that it was "rather bewildering" that $500,000 had already been spent on the library, even though it had not been fitted out. MacCracken also requested that the library be fitted out with green Connemara marble columns, rather than the "sham" marble columns in White's original plans. White's partner McKim had secured only two Connemara marble columns for Columbia's Low Library due to the small amount of Connemara marble available. After acquiring 16 columns for the Gould Library, White boasted that McKim had been unable to secure the same material for Columbia's library. The first event hosted at the library was a conference for the American Philological Association, which convened at Gould in July 1899. By the end of the year, the Gould Library was nearly complete; its construction had been delayed due to difficulties in securing the Connemara marble columns.

=== NYU use ===
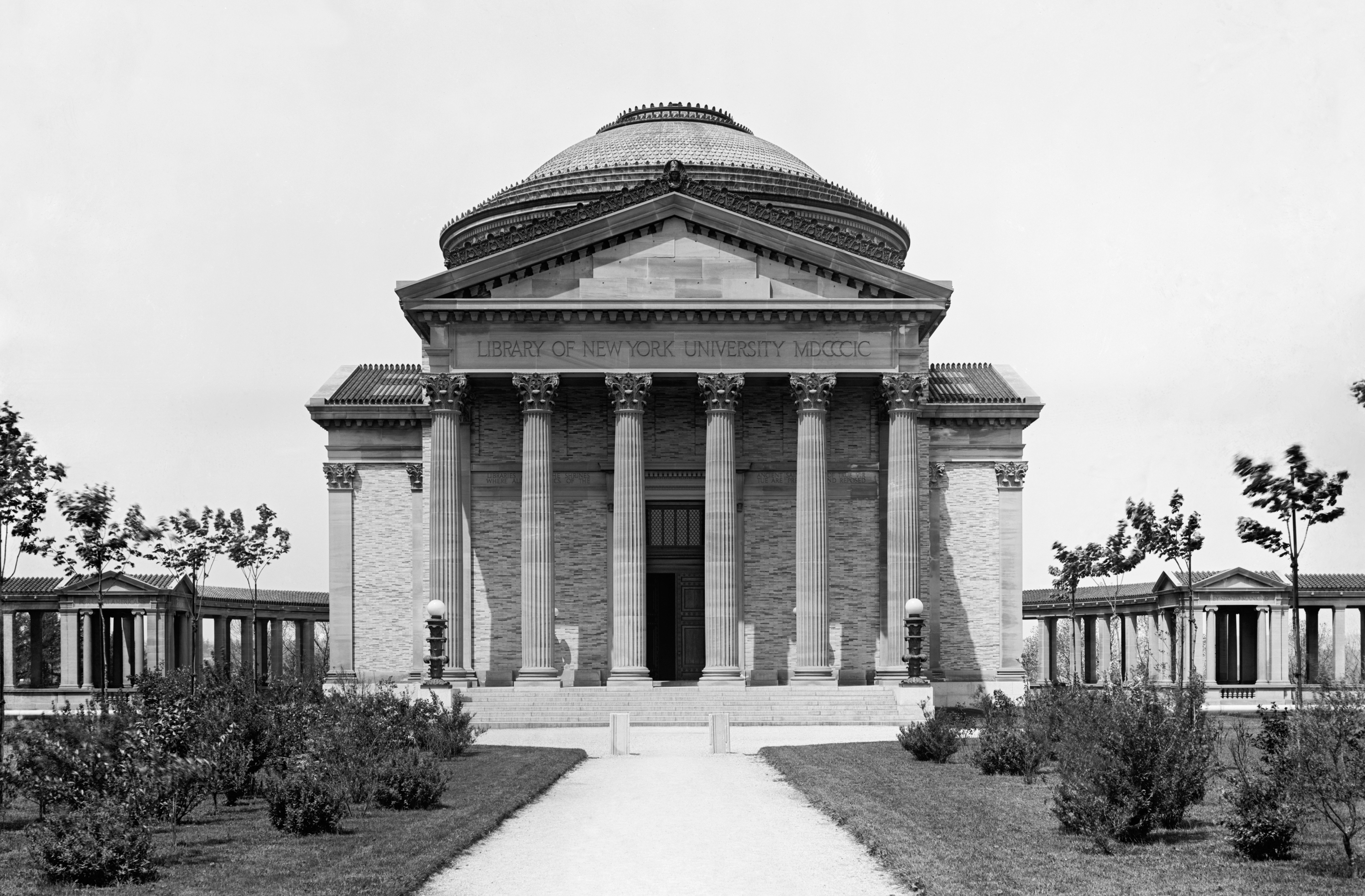
The Gould Memorial Library shortly after it was completed in 1900

The library was completed in 1900. According to a New-York Tribune article from that December, all work had been finished except for the installation of some furniture. Within a month, the Tribune said of the library: "Hardly a week passes without major additions to it." A stained-glass window depicting justice, goodness, and power was also installed at Gould in early 1901. By the end of the year, Gould had 61,000 volumes, of which 5,000 had been added during the past year. The adjacent Hall of Fame was dedicated in May 1901, a year after Shepard had donated $100,000 for the hall. NYU started using the library's auditorium for commencement ceremonies in 1903. During the early 20th century, the library hosted free concerts, public-speaking contests, and Easter services.

NYU approved plans for the Hall of American Artists at the Gould Library in the late 1910s. Sixteen busts of artists, painters, and sculptors were approved for the library's reading room. The first busts, commemorating American artists Carroll Beckwith, George Inness, and Clinton Ogilvie, were installed at the Gould Library in August 1921. That December, NYU officials dedicated a new set of front doors for the library, which had been manufactured in memory of Stanford White. Other busts at Gould included those of William Merritt Chase (1923); Augustus Saint-Gaudens (1925); James Abbott McNeill Whistler and Samuel Morse (1928); Francis Davis Millet, Elihu Vedder, Charles Webster Hawthorne, and Charles Grafly (1934); and Charles Henry Niehaus (1938). A bust of NYU chancellor Elmer Ellsworth Brown was installed in the chancellors' office in 1932, following his retirement.

The library's auditorium continued to host commencement ceremonies for students who were graduating with baccalaureate degrees. Starting with the 1943 ceremony, overflow seating was placed outside the library due to the growing number of guests at the annual ceremonies. During the late 1940s and early 1950s, the Gould Library also hosted pie-throwing contests to raise money for various student organizations. The library was also used for exhibits in the mid-20th century, such as a display of printing mediums and a showcase of old maps of the Bronx. The James Arthur Museum of Clocks and Watches, which opened in the basement in 1950, operated for at least a decade. NYU built additional libraries in the 1950s, since the Gould Library could no longer accommodate all of NYU's collections.

By the early 1960s, NYU's Bronx campus had 5,000 students, just over 10 percent of the university's total enrollment. Though the Bronx campus was the more prestigious of NYU's two campuses, its facilities were in dire need of upgrades. NYU announced a $75 million capital expansion plan for its campuses in 1961, including $1 million for a renovation and expansion of the Gould Library. The university started fundraising in 1964 and had obtained most of the necessary funds within three years. The New York City Landmarks Preservation Commission (LPC) designated the exterior of the Gould Library as a city landmark in March 1966. The NYU campus was the site of several student protests in the late 1960s. Amid this unrest, Gould's auditorium was severely damaged by arson in April 1969, though the main library was not damaged. At the time, Gould had 300,000 books. Marcel Breuer redesigned the auditorium in a brutalist style; the original ornamentation was removed and a wall was constructed in front of the balcony.

=== CUNY use ===
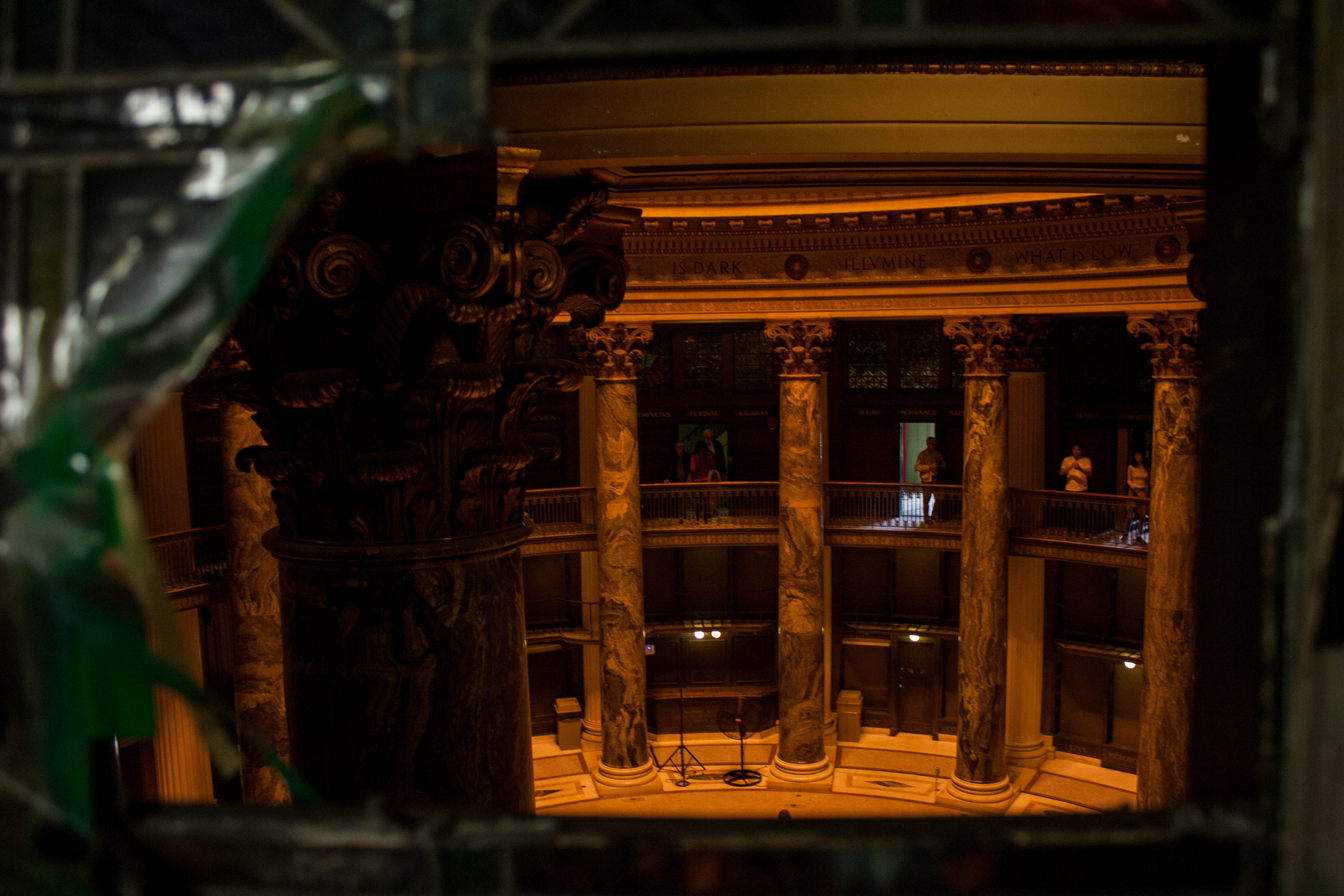
The rotunda as viewed through a broken Tiffany-glass window

The number of students at the Bronx campus decreased by 40 percent from 1968 to 1973, creating a large financial deficit for NYU. The New York state government recommended in February 1972 that NYU sell its Bronx campus, and governor Nelson Rockefeller authorized the sale three months later. New York City's public university system, the City University of New York (CUNY), acquired the campus in early 1973 for $62 million, moving Bronx Community College there. BCC moved onto the campus that September. BCC did not use the building as a library, since the stacks were arranged inefficiently, although BCC still used the auditorium for assemblies. The reading room was only used occasionally for parties and other events. The Gould Library was added to the National Register of Historic Places in 1979, as part of the Hall of Fame Complex, and the LPC designated the library's interior as a New York City landmark in 1981.

The Gould Library fell into disrepair during the late 20th century. The library's upkeep was funded through grants from politicians, as well as payments from filmmakers who used the library as a filming location. One issue was that, since the library building had few emergency exits, it had a very low seating capacity. In 1996, BCC hired the firm of Platt Byard Dovell to restore the auditorium, and it hired William A. Hall Partnership to design a rehabilitation of the roof. The basement auditorium was restored to its original appearance in 2000 after Bronx borough president Fernando Ferrer allocated funding for the project. Ferrer also provided funding for a new sound and lighting system for the library. The J. Paul Getty Trust granted $228,000 for the restoration of the Gould Library and other buildings on the BCC campus in 2004. By then, dirt had accumulated throughout the library; the bookshelves were dangling from the walls; and the skylight atop the reading room was covered by a sheet. Additionally, the steel superstructure of the library had corroded because the steel beams were not galvanized. Conservators used the funds to research the library's history, examine the building's condition, and create a preservation plan.

In 2012, the National Park Service designated the BCC campus, including the Gould Memorial Library, as a National Historic Landmark. BCC was the first community college in the United States to be designated as such. By 2015, a group called Save Gould Memorial Library was advocating for the building to be restored and reused. A spokesperson for Bronx Community College said, "It matters to CUNY, but we've got to keep heat going for students." The city had provided $4 million for the restoration of the library building, and the Extell Development Company provided additional funds for the digitization of the library's original blueprints. Save Gould Memorial Library estimated that the renovation would cost $50 million. One of the largest issues was the deteriorated condition of the drum, as the entire dome could collapse if the drum were not repaired. BCC began restoring the library in the early 2020s. Gould's dome and oculus were restored at a cost of $18.3 million, and an exit stair was added for $2 million; both projects were completed in May 2023.

== Impact ==
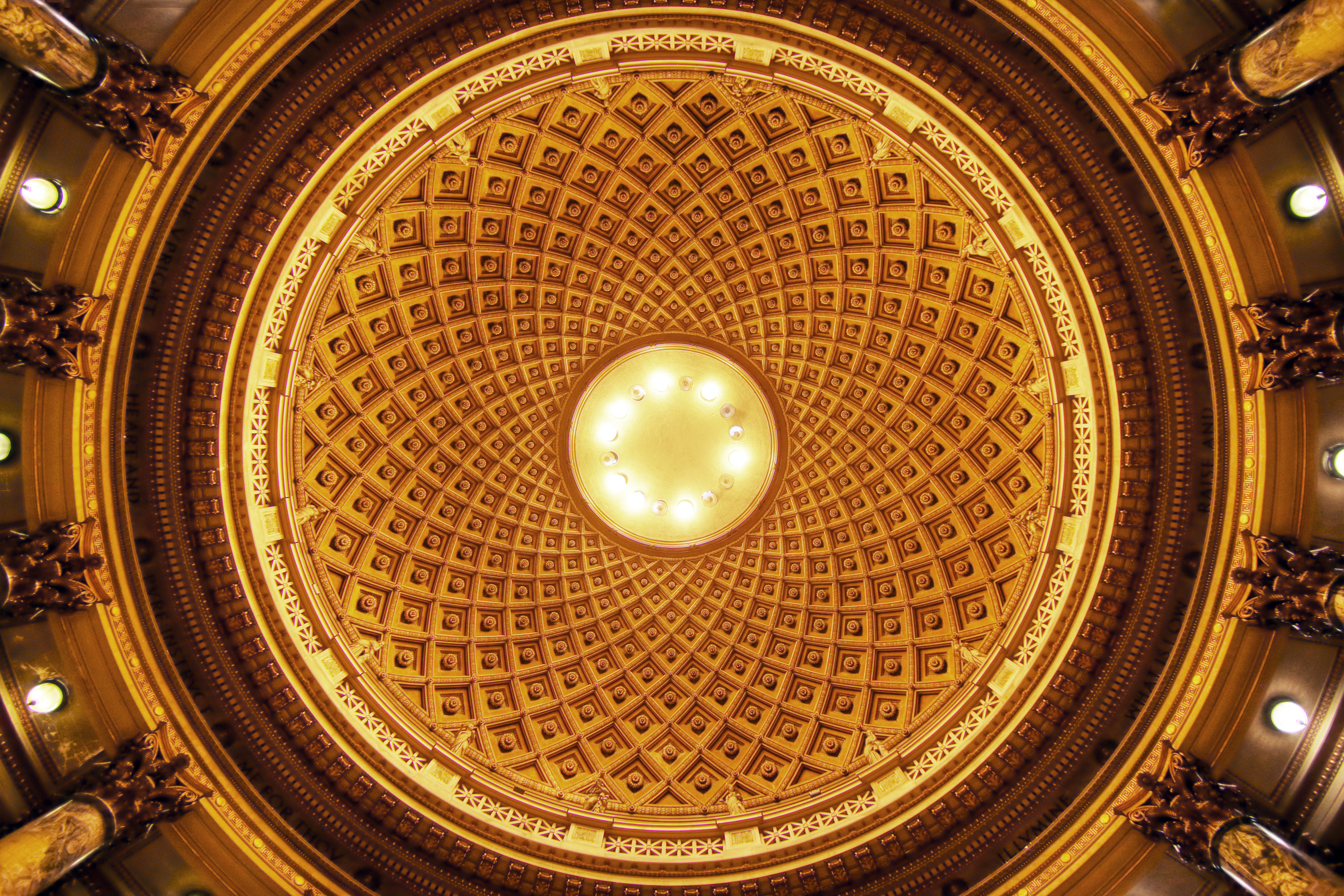
View of dome

According to a 1921 article in The New York Times, the reading room had been "declared by some critics to have no superiors outside of St. Paul's in Rome". Paul Goldberger described the library in 1984 as a "kind of pantheon, surrounded by the long, curving colonnade of one of the most remarkable places in New York". Three decades later, Christopher Gray of the Times described Gould as "full of brilliant flashes of excitement, like lightning bolts in a grand thunderstorm", in contrast with McKim's design for the Low Library. Columbia University architectural professor Andrew Dolkart said in 2005: "The interior is among the most dramatic and most magnificent in America."

A model of NYU's University Heights campus, including the Gould Memorial Library, was displayed at the Louisiana Purchase Exposition in St. Louis in 1904. The library was separately featured in an exhibition presented by the Bronx Museum of the Arts in 1986.

The Gould Memorial Library, along with other buildings on the BCC campus, has frequently been used as a filming location. The library has been shown in films such as Sophie's Choice (1982), The Thomas Crown Affair (1999), and A Beautiful Mind (2001). Additionally, the United States Postal Service issued postage stamps depicting notable works by American architects in 1981. The Gould Library was depicted on the stamp representing Stanford White's work.

== See also ==
- List of New York City Designated Landmarks in the Bronx
- National Register of Historic Places listings in the Bronx
