= Julia Warner Snow =

American botanist (1863–1927)

- Born: August 30, 1863; LaSalle, Illinois
- Died: October 24, 1927 (aged 64); Boston, Massachusetts
- Education: Ph. D.
- Alma mater: Cornell University; University of Zurich
- Occupation: Botanist

Julia Warner Snow (August 30, 1863 – October 24, 1927) was an American botanist and was known in the scientific community for her work as a systematic phycologist.

== Biography ==
Snow was born in LaSalle, Illinois, the third child of Norman G. Snow and Charlotte D. (née Warner). At the age of sixteen she left LaSalle to enter Hungerford Collegiate Institute, Adams, New York. After graduating in 1880, she returned home to live with her parents, then in 1884 matriculated to Cornell University in Ithaca, New York. While an undergraduate, she joined the Kappa Alpha Theta fraternity. When the Sigma Xi honor society was formed at Cornell in 1886, Snow joined along with fellow Theta Anna Botsford Comstock. She graduated with a Bachelor of Science degree in 1888.

Returning to Cornell for graduate studies, Snow was awarded a M.S. degree in 1889 with a thesis titled Sphaerella Fragariae: A Fungus Disease of the Strawberry Plant. She spent a year teaching botany in Eau Claire, Wisconsin at the Hardy Preparatory School, then for a year at Coates College for Women in Terre Haute, Indiana. Julia Snow became one of the first recipients of an Association of College Alumnae fellowship, and used it to study at Zürich in Europe during 1891–92. A WEA fellowship the following year allowed her to complete her Ph.D. program. She graduated with a thesis titled Conductive Tissue of the Monocotyledonous Plants.

During the period 1894–96, she taught science at the American College for Girls in Constantinople. She studied research training at the University of Göttingen and completed some post-graduate studies at the University of Basel. By 1898 she had returned to the U.S. with a fellowship at the University of Michigan, where she taught botany until 1900. In 1901 she was named head of the Biology Department at Rockford College. During the summers of 1898–1901 she worked with the U.S. Fish Commission to perform a biological survey of Lake Erie. She joined the staff of Smith College in 1901 as an assistant in the biology department. Dr. Snow was promoted to instructor in 1902, and became the first at the college to teach courses in bacteriology. In 1906 she was named associate professor. She spent the remainder of her life at Northampton, Massachusetts.

Snow was noted for her international travels. During the 1890s she journeyed alone from Constantinople to Russia. She spent considerable time in China and India, pursuing her interests in regional art and architecture, and circling the world twice. Her scientific research was focused on plant conductive tissues and fresh water algae, with several papers published during 1899–1912. The green algae Chlamydomonas snowiae is named after her, as is the bacterial Genus Snowella. Her older brother, Benjamin Warner Snow, was professor of physics at the University of Wisconsin.

== Bibliography ==
The standard author abbreviation J.Snow is used to indicate this person as the author when citing a botanical name.

- Snow, Julia W. (1888). "The Biology and History of Pinus Rigida, Mill". Dissertation. Cornell University.
- Snow, Julia W. (1893). "Conductive Tissue of the Monocotyledonous Plants". Dissertation.
- Snow, Julia W. (1889). Sphaerella Fragariae: A Fungus Disease of the Strawberry Plant (Ph.D. thesis). Cornell University.
- Snow, Julia W. (1899). "Pseudo-Pleurococcus, Nov. gen". Annals of Botany. 13 (50): 189–195. doi:10.1093/oxfordjournals.aob.a088729.
- Snow, Julia W. (1899). "Ulvella Americana". Botanical Gazette. 27 (4): 309–314. doi:10.1086/327829. S2CID 224841419.
- Snow, Julia W. (1902). "The plankton algae of Lake Erie, with special reference to the Chlorophyceae". Bulletin of the United States Fish Commission: 371–394.
- Snow, Julia W. (1911). "Two epiphytic algae". Botanical Gazette. 51 (5): 360–368. doi:10.1086/330525.
- Snow, Julia W. (1912). "Two epiphytic algae: a correction". Botanical Gazette. 53 (4): 347. doi:10.1086/330810.
