= Matilda Auchincloss Brownell =

American Impressionist painter and portraitist

- Born: October 19, 1871; New York City, New York
- Died: September 15, 1966 (aged 94); New York City, New York
- Education: Art Students League of New York, Shinnecock Hills Summer School of Art, Académie Colarossi
- Known for: Painting

Matilda Auchincloss Brownell (October 19, 1871 – September 15, 1966) was an American Impressionist painter and portraitist.

== Early life and education ==
Born into an upper class, well-connected family in New York City, Matilda Auchincloss Brownell was the daughter of New York City Bar Association Secretary Silas B. Brownell (1830-1918) and Sarah Stoddard Sheffield (1845-1922). Her paternal lineage traces back to Colonial settlers who came to New England in 1638. In 1894 Brownell attended the Shinnecock Hills Summer School of Art, where she was a student of William Merritt Chase. During this same time period she also studied at the Art Students League of New York with Chase and formed a lasting friendship with Mary Cassatt, as evidenced in several letters written in the 1890s. Brownell then traveled to Paris to continue her studies at the Académie Colarossi and was a student of Frederick William MacMonnies. During her time abroad, Matilda visited many countries, including Italy and England, in the tradition of the Grand Tour. In Paris, Brownell met a fellow student and gifted sculptor named Janet Scudder. The two would become close friends, with Brownell's father Silas eventually helping to secure the struggling Scudder her first major commission to design the seal for the New York City Bar Association. In 1898 Brownell and Scudder returned to Paris together, living in an 18th-century house on Boulevard Raspail and once again attending Académie Colarossi, where the pair would draw from life in the evenings.

== Exhibitions and Museum Collections ==
After her return to America, Miss Brownell (who never married) would go on to exhibit at the National Academy of Design in New York, The Panama–Pacific International Exposition of 1915, the Corcoran Gallery of Art in Washington D.C., The Society of Independent Artists, the Art Institute of Chicago, and the Pennsylvania Academy of the Fine Arts, among other New York City galleries and a London exhibition in 1921, where critics praised her "clever still-life paintings." At the Panama-Pacific International Exposition, the celebrated American painter Mary Foote exhibited a "quiet, restful portrait of Miss Matilda Brownell." Barnard College purchased Brownell's portrait of Dean Gildersleeve in 1920 after the painting was exhibited at Knoedler Galleries in New York City. The Brooklyn Museum acquired a still life by Brownell in 1930, and the Metropolitan Museum of Art acquired her "Spring, Luxembourg Garden" (1902) in 1966.
