= Bronx Community College Library =

Library in the Bronx, New York

Coordinates: 40.85901°N 73.91255°W

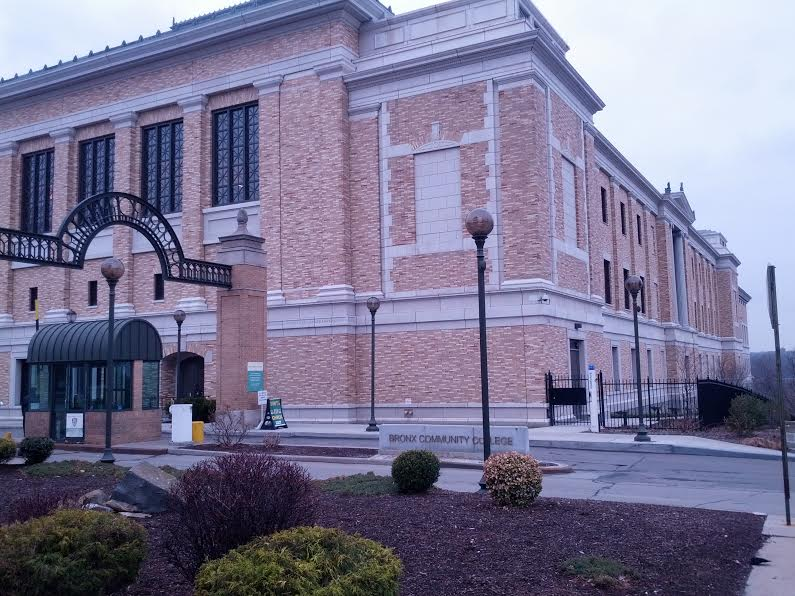
- Hall of Fame Terrence view of BCC library
- Location: 2155 University Avenue; Bronx, New York 10453; United States
- Established: 1973

Other information
- Director: Michael Miller
- Website: http://bcc-libweb.bcc.cuny.edu/

The Bronx Community College Library is located on the campus of Bronx Community College (BCC) and is a part of the City University of New York system. The library is at the North Hall and opened in 2012.

== Description ==
There are three floors in this building, with the ground floor having 15 classrooms. The library uses the second and third floors of the building. On the second floor, computers are available in the information common area. There are 25 group study rooms. and one classroom for library instruction. Appropriate assistance can be found facilitated by library employees within three desk areas: Reference, Circulation and New Media. On the third floor, there is the law collection classroom and the main stacks of circulation books. The North Hall has a distinction of being a green building, with LEED Silver certification.

== History ==
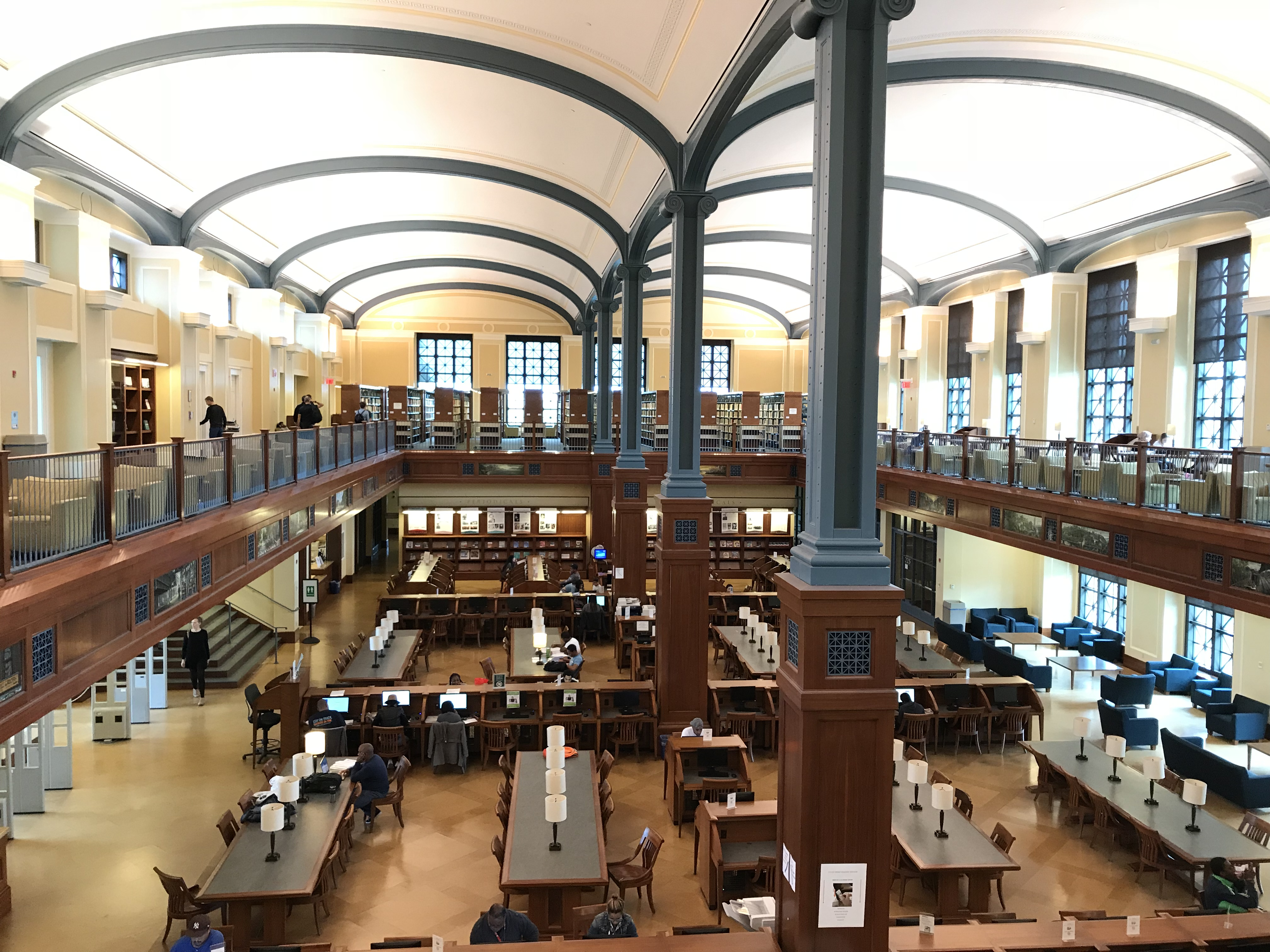
interior of the library

The North Hall is the second building on BCC's campus to be known as the library location. It had an official ribbon cutting ceremony on September 21, 2012.

The Gould Memorial Library is from New York University's previous occupation on this campus. It has a rotunda dome, and is currently used as an event space.

When Bronx Community College began operations on this campus around 1973, Meister Hall was used as the main library facility. With the collection and needs expanding, Sage Hall was used eventually to house the Gerald S. Lieblich Learning Resource Center that acted as a support for the main library and other departments' needs. This is mentioned in a printed handbook history written by Professor Annette Peretz.
