= Bronx Community College =

Public college in the Bronx, New York City, US

- Type: Public community college
- Established: 1957; 69 years ago
- Parent institution: CUNY
- President: Thomas A. Isekenegbe
- Students: 10,919 (2016)
- Other students: Community College
- Location: University Heights, Bronx, New York City, New York, United States
- Campus: 45 acres (18 ha)
- Colors: Black, green, and gold
- Nickname: Broncos
- Sporting affiliations: NJCAA – CUNYAC
- Website: bcc.cuny.edu
- University Heights Campus (formerly New York University)
- U.S. National Register of Historic Places
- U.S. National Historic Landmark
- New York City Landmark
- Location within New York City Location within New York Location within the United States
- Coordinates: 40°51′29″N 73°54′45″W
- Architect: Stanford White; Marcel Breuer
- Architectural style: Classical Revival (White); Brutalist (Breuer)
- NRHP reference No.: 12001013

Significant dates
- Designated NHL: October 16, 2012
- Designated NYCL: Gould Memorial Library; Hall of Fame for Great Americans; Hall of Languages & Cornelius Baker Hall of Philosophy: February 15, 1966; Begrisch Hall: January 8, 2002

The Bronx Community College of the City University of New York (BCC) is a public community college in the Bronx, New York City. It is part of the City University of New York system.

== History ==
The college was established in 1957 through the efforts of civic-minded groups who felt that there was a growing need for more higher education facilities in the Bronx. Classes began at Hunter College, and later at the former site of the Bronx High School of Science.

In 1973, the Dormitory Authority of the State of New York acquired the University Heights campus from New York University (NYU), which had sold the campus under threat of imminent bankruptcy. Beginning that fall, the BCC moved its operations to the 55 acres (22 ha) site overlooking the Harlem River.

In 2012, the North Hall and Library opened. The building is designed to resemble many of the historic structures on campus, and one end of the building is located next to an entrance of the Hall of Fame for Great Americans.

== Academics ==
The college is home to the Center for Sustainable Energy, which was founded in 2003 as an educational resource for students pursuing careers in alternative energy.

Bronx Community College offers a wide array of workforce community development and personal enrichment courses and programs through Continuing & Professional Studies. CPS also delivers customized training for local employers. CPS works closely with unions, city, state and federal agencies and accepts vouchers and other forms of financial aid for individual students.

Since 1987, the college is also the local administrator of the SUNY Bronx Educational Opportunity Center. The SUNY Bronx EOC provides tuition free academic and vocational programs to New Yorkers who qualify and it is funded by the University Center for Academic and Workforce Development (UCAWD), part of the State University of New York.

== Campus ==
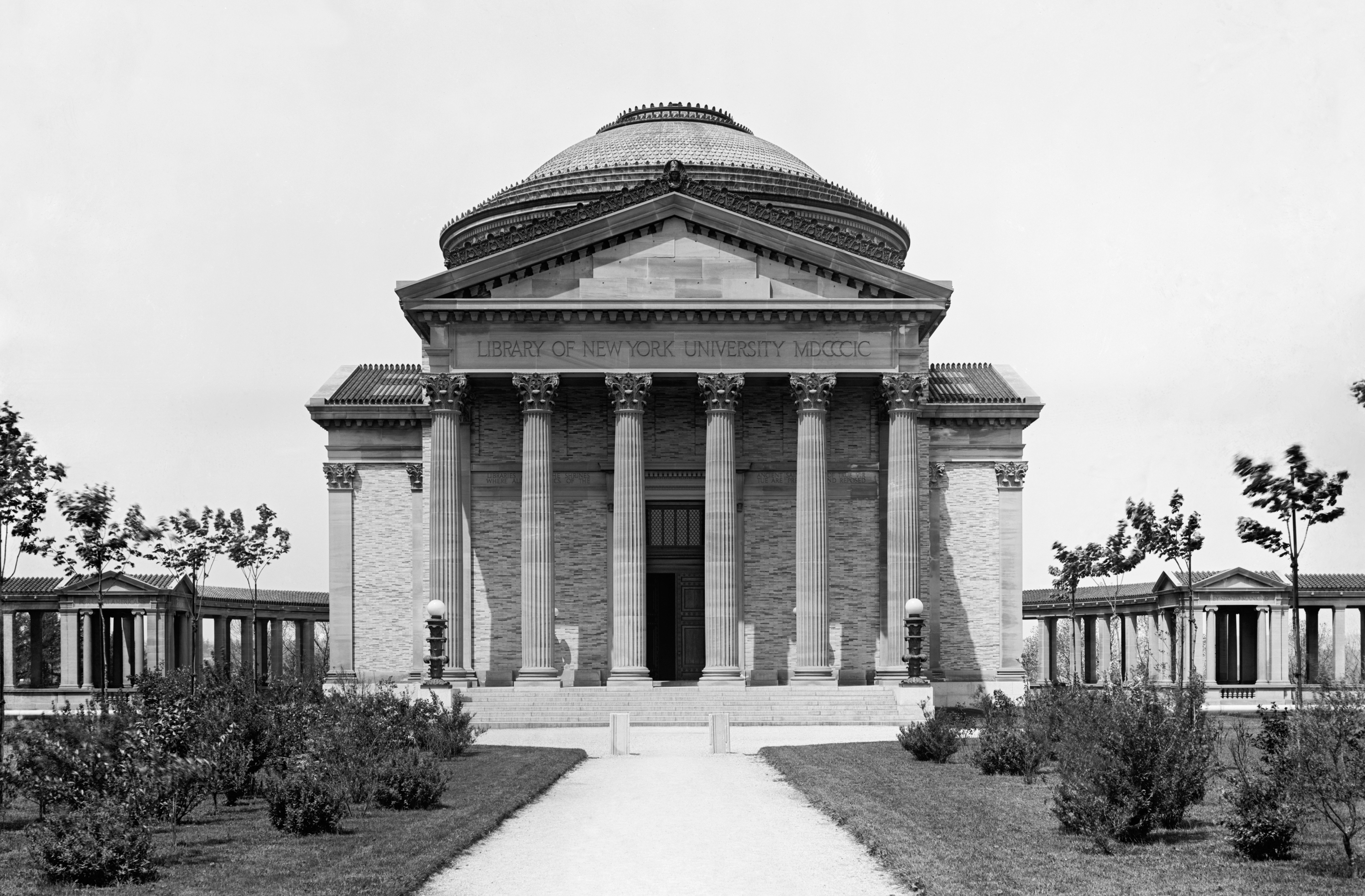
Gould Memorial Library of Bronx Community College, designed by architect Stanford White, shown in 1904 when the campus was part of New York University; the Hall of Fame for Great Americans arcade is visible on either side of the library

The BCC campus originally housed New York University's undergraduate college and engineering school – which was absorbed by Polytechnic Institute of Brooklyn in 1973 but is once again part of NYU – and was created at a time when a number of prominent local universities had made the move to upper Manhattan and the Bronx in order to build bigger campuses, including Columbia University, and the City College of New York.

The campus consists of a mix of Classical revival buildings designed by architect Stanford White in 1892–1901 – including the Hall of Languages, the Cornelius Baker Hall of Philosophy and the Gould Memorial Library – and Brutalist concrete buildings by Marcel Breuer, including Begrisch Hall (1956–61) and the Colston Residence Hall and Cafeteria (1964). Other buildings – such as South Hall, formerly the Gustav H. Schwab House (1857); Butler Hall, formerly William Henry W. T. Mall House (c. 1859); and MacCracken Hall, originally the Loring Andrews House (c. 1880) – are repurposed mansions which predate the campus. The original landscaping for the campus was by Vaux & Co. The complex of Stanford White buildings, judged one of the finest concentrations of Beaux Arts architecture in the US, was designated a National Historic Landmark in 2012.

On the BCC campus is the Hall of Fame for Great Americans, founded in 1900 by Henry Mitchell MacCracken, Chancellor of NYU from 1891 to 1910. It was the first such hall of fame in the United States. The Hall, which is listed on the National Register of Historic Places, was also designed by Stanford White, and was established to honor prominent Americans who have had a significant impact on the country's history. It includes bronze busts of Alexander Graham Bell, Eli Whitney, and George Westinghouse along with many others. The Hall has not had any new inductees since 1976.

== Public transit access ==
The closest subway stations to Bronx Community College are Burnside Avenue and 183rd Street, which are both served by the 4 train. The primary bus serving the college is the Bx3.

== Athletics ==
Bronx Community College teams participate as a member of the National Junior College Athletic Association (NJCAA). The Broncos are a member of the community college section of the City University of New York Athletic Conference (CUNYAC). Men's sports include baseball, basketball, cross country, soccer and track & field; while women's sports include basketball, cross country, track & field and volleyball.

== In popular culture ==
The college has been used as the set for scenes in many movies:

- In 2001, parts of the film A Beautiful Mind that depicted MIT were instead filmed in the BCC, due to the film's low budget. The dome at BCC was also used in the filming of The Good Shepherd.
- The interior of the Gould Memorial Library was featured as a public library in the 1969 film Goodbye, Columbus.
- The Meister Hall building at BCC by architect Marcel Breuer was featured as a Russian Embassy in the 2008 film Burn After Reading by the Coen brothers.
- Other films that used the campus for filming have included The Thomas Crown Affair, The Siege, Mona Lisa Smile, Kinsey, and Riding in Cars With Boys.

== Notable alumni ==
- David Berkowitz (b 1953), also known as the Son of Sam and .44 Caliber Killer, is an American serial killer
- Richard Carmona (b 1949), is an American physician, nurse, police officer, public health administrator, and politician. He was a vice admiral in the Public Health Service Commissioned Corps and served as the seventeenth Surgeon General of the United States.
- Joel Martinez (b 1983), professionally known as The Kid Mero, is a Dominican-American writer, comedian, TV personality, voice actor, YouTube personality, music blogger and Twitter personality.
- Annabel Palma, is an American politician who served in the New York City Council from the 18th district from 2004 to 2017.
- Big Bank Hank, (1956–2014), is an American rapper a member of The Sugarhill Gang.

== Gallery ==
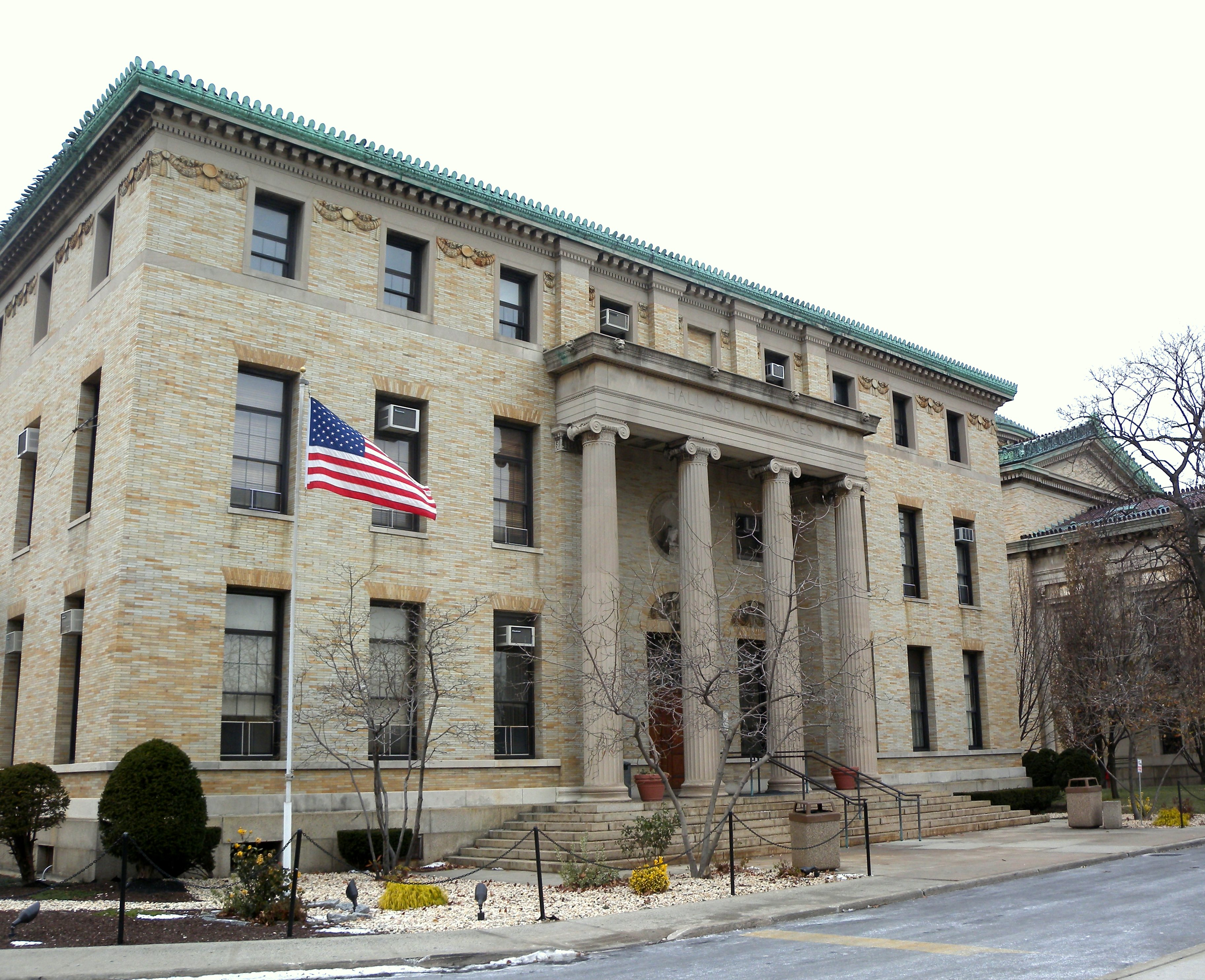
The Stanford White-designed Hall of Languages

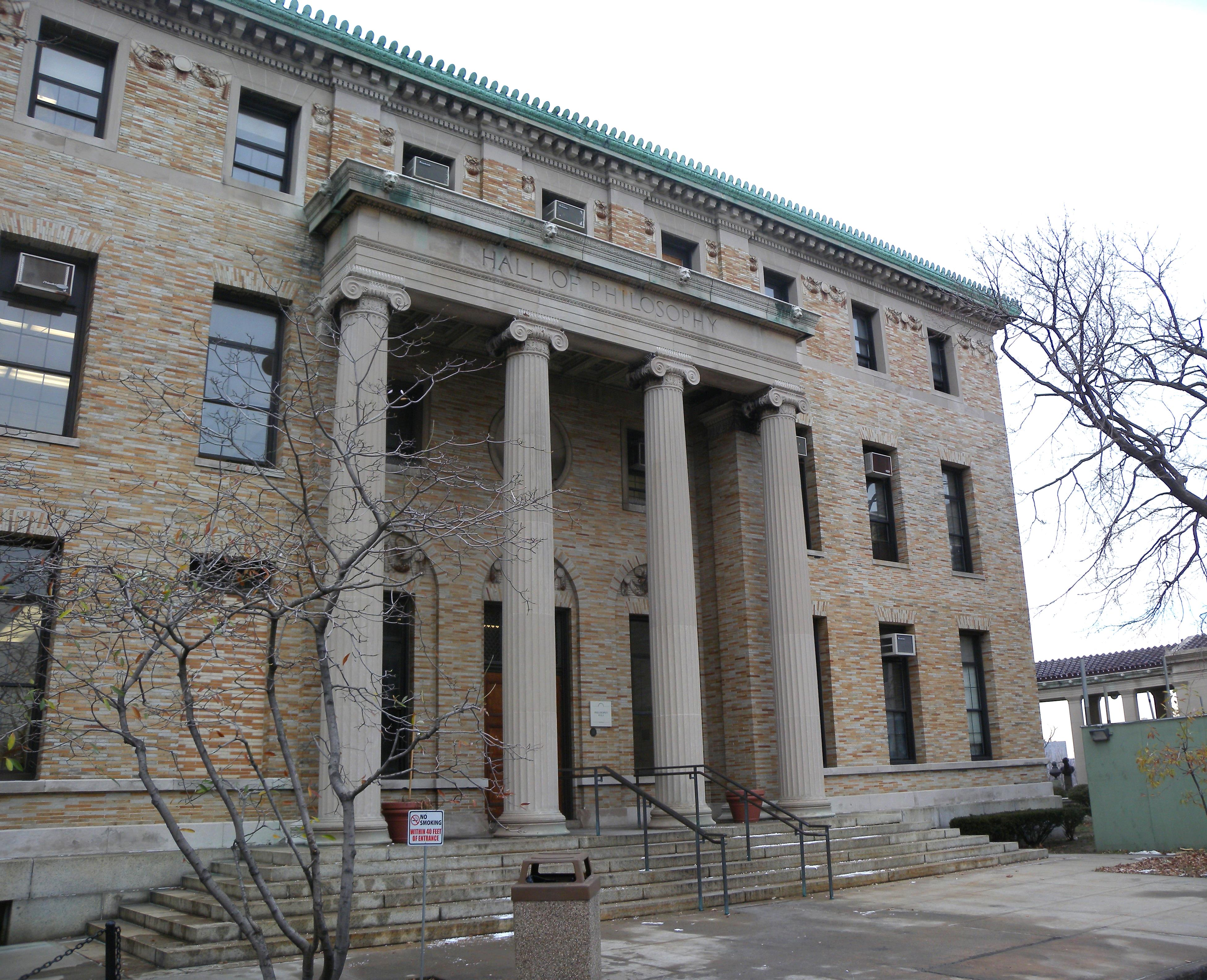
The Hall of Philosophy, also designed by Stanford White

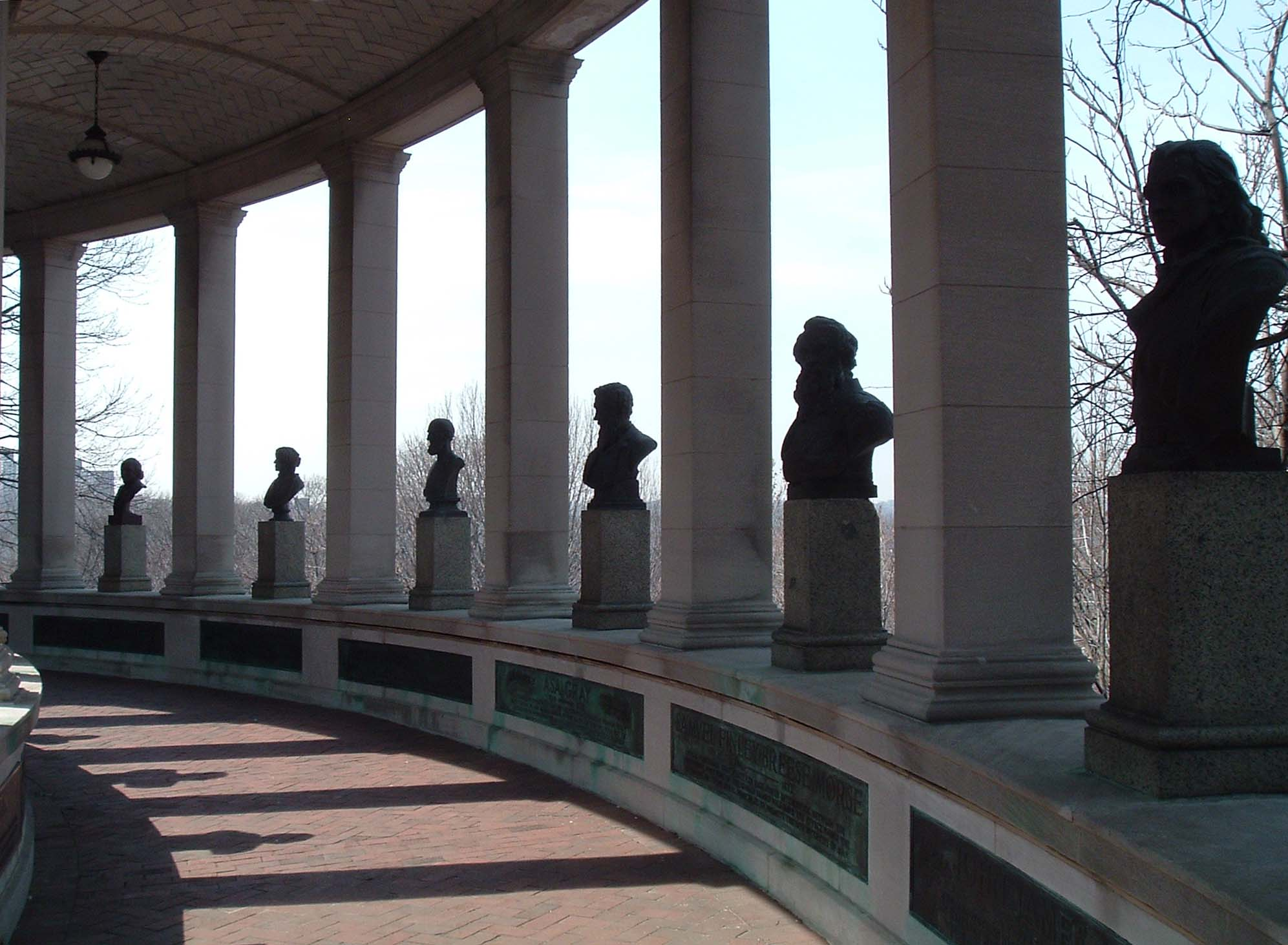
The Hall of Fame for Great Americans is located on the BCC campus

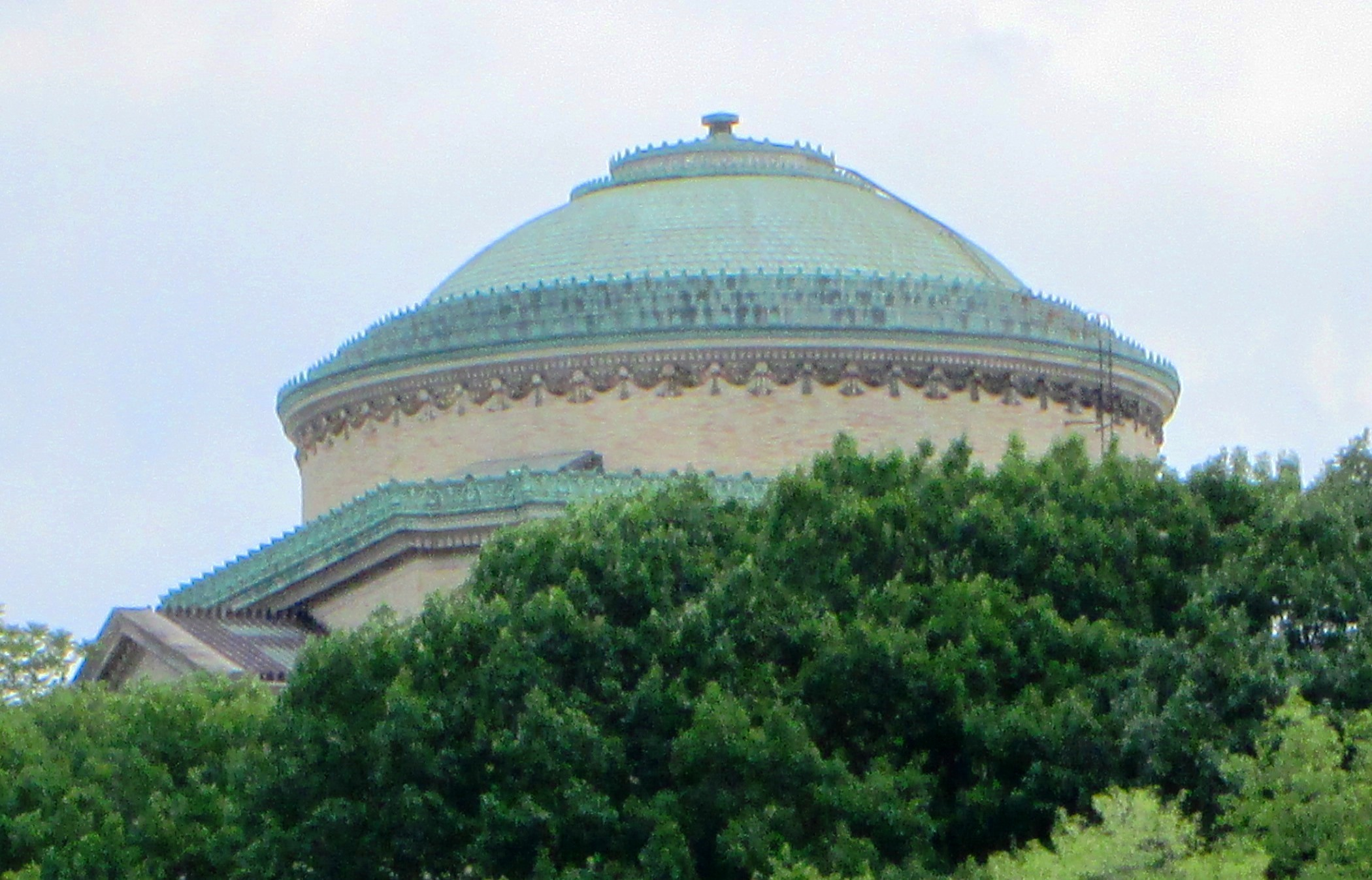
The dome of the Gould Memorial Library can be seen above the trees from many locations in Upper Manhattan

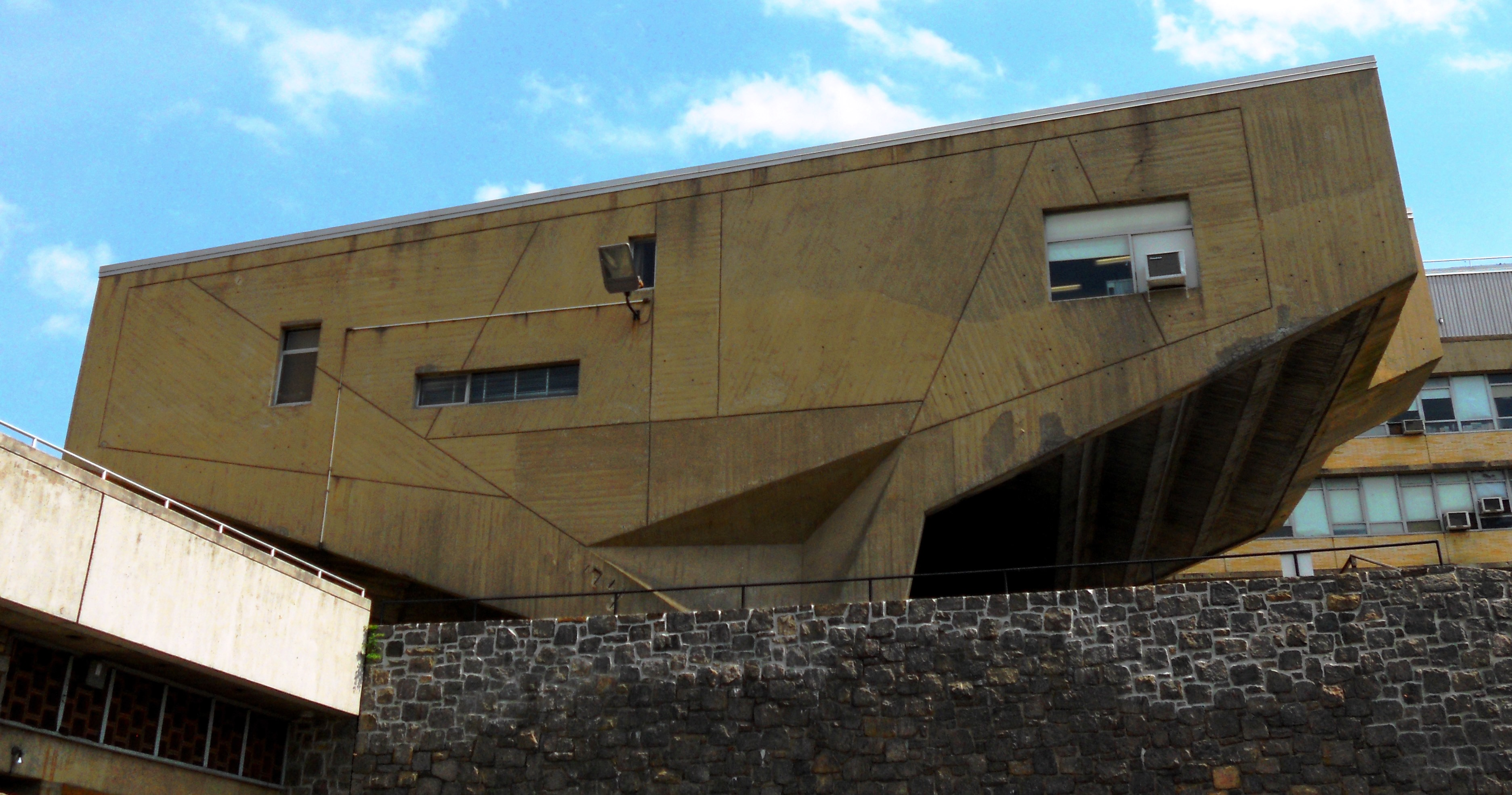
The western elevation of Marcel Breuer's Begrisch Hall

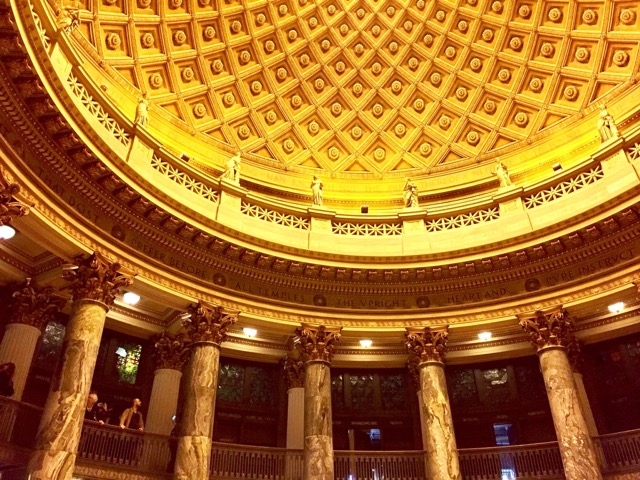
Inside the Gould Memorial Library

== See also ==
- List of New York City Designated Landmarks in the Bronx
- National Register of Historic Places listings in the Bronx
- Bronx Community College Library
