= Janet Scudder =

American sculptor (1869–1940)

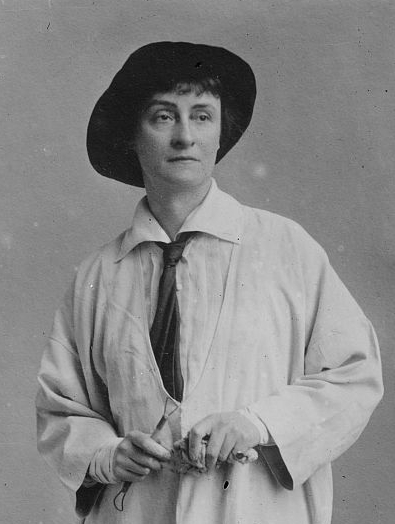
- Born: October 27, 1869; Terre Haute, Indiana, US
- Died: June 9, 1940 (aged 70); Rockport, Massachusetts, US
- Education: Rose Polytechnic Institute of Technology, Cincinnati Art Academy, Académie Colarossi
- Known for: Sculpture

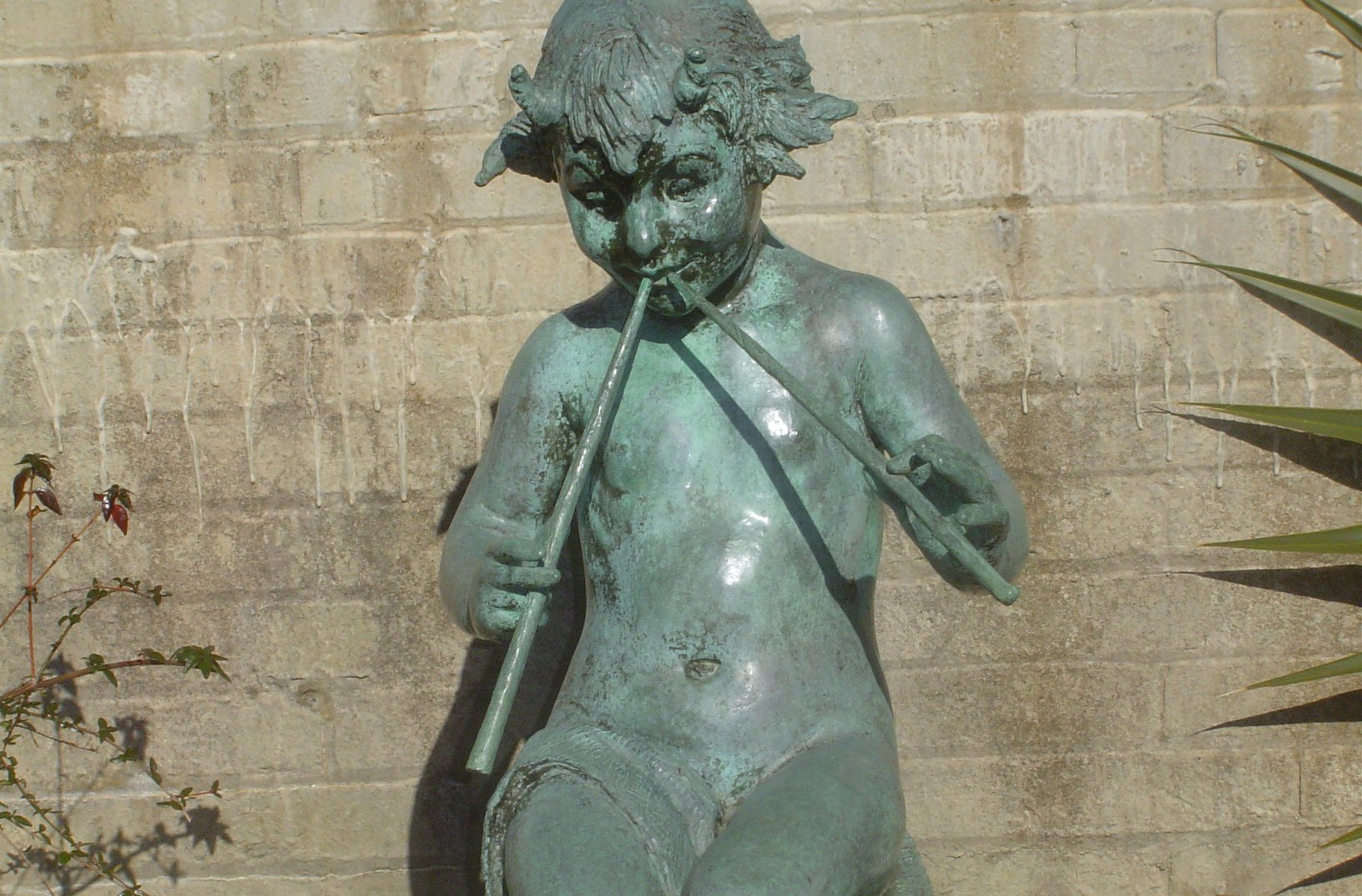
Brookgreen Gardens - sculpture garden: Seated Faun by Janet Scudder, 1924. Signed on left of base

Janet (October 27, 1869 – June 9, 1940), born Netta Deweze Frazee Scudder, was an American sculptor and painter from Terre Haute, Indiana, who is best known for her memorial sculptures, bas-relief portraiture, and portrait medallions, as well as her garden sculptures and fountains. Her first major commission was the design for the seal of the New York Bar Association around 1896. Scudder's Frog Fountain (1901) led to the series of sculptures and fountains for which she is best known. Later commissions included a Congressional Gold Medal honoring Domício da Gama (Brazil's ambassador to the United States) and a commemorative medal for Indiana's centennial in 1916. Scudder also displayed her work at numerous national and international exhibitions in the United States and in Europe from the late 1890s to the late 1930s. Scudder's autobiography, Modeling My Life, was published in 1925.

Scudder received art training at the Art Academy of Cincinnati in 1887–89 and 1890–91 and the Art Institute of Chicago in 1891–92. In addition, she worked as an assistant to Lorado Taft during preparations for the World's Columbian Exposition in Chicago, in 1892–93, and with Frederick W. MacMonnies in Paris, France in 1894–96, while continuing her art studies at the Académie Vitti and the Académie Colarossi. Scudder was a member of New York State Woman Suffrage Association, the art committee of the National American Woman Suffrage Association, and in 1920, was elected an associate of the National Academy of Design. Scudder was named a Chevalier of the French Legion of Honor in 1925 for her relief work as a Red Cross volunteer in France during World War I.

Scudder was the recipient of several awards and prizes for her artwork, including a Bronze Medal, World's Columbian Exposition, 1893; a Bronze Medal, Louisiana Purchase Exposition, 1904; a Silver Medal, Panama–Pacific International Exposition, 1915; and a Silver Medal, International Exposition, 1937, among others. Her work is represented in the collections of the Musée d'Orsay in the Musée d'Art Moderne de la Ville de Paris in France, and in the United States at the Library of Congress, the Metropolitan Museum of Art, the Art Institute of Chicago, the Peabody Institute, Brookgreen Gardens, the Huntington Library, Art Gallery and Botanical Gardens, the Indianapolis Museum of Art; the Indiana State Museum, the Indiana Historical Society, the Swope Art Museum, and the Richmond Art Museum.

== Early life and education ==
Netta Deweze Frazee Scudder was born on October 27, 1869, in Terre Haute, Indiana, to Mary (Sparks) and William Hollingshead Scudder. "Nettie" as she was called by her family was the fifth of seven children and had a childhood marred by tragedy. Her father was a confectioner who was active in community affairs. Her mother died at the age of thirty-eight, when "Nettie" Scudder was five years old. Four of Scudder's siblings died before they reached adulthood. Scudder's father, a blind grandmother, and Hannah Hussey (the family maid, cook, and housekeeper) raised the surviving children. Her father later married a woman whom Scudder disliked.

Scudder enjoyed drawing as a child and took Saturday art classes at Rose Polytechnic Institute of Technology (present-day Rose-Hulman Institute of Technology) under the direction of Professor William Ames. After graduating from Terre Haute High School in 1887, she enrolled at the Cincinnati Art Academy, despite the family's fragile financial resources, and soon changed her name to Janet Scudder. At Cincinnati she studied sculpture with Italian-born sculptor Louis Rebisso, as well as decorative design, woodcarving, and painting.

In 1888–89, Scudder returned home to Terre Haute, where the family's hardships continued after the death of one of her brothers, the failure of her father's business, and his death in 1888. To help with household expenses, twenty-year-old Scudder taught woodcarving at a local school, Coates College for Women. Scudder's oldest brother, who was living in Chicago, paid for her return to Cincinnati in 1890 so that she could complete her studies at the academy. In 1891, Scudder moved to Chicago to live with her brother and his family while she attended classes at the Art Institute of Chicago under the direction of John Vanderpoel and Frederick Freer. Scudder also took classes with French-trained sculptor Lorado Taft at the Art Institute during 1893–94. While living in Paris, in the mid-1890s, she took classes at the Académie Vitti and studied drawing with painter Luc-Olivier Merson at the Académie Colarossi.

== Career ==
=== Early years as a sculptor ===
After her move to Chicago in 1891, Scudder intended to earn a living as a wood carver and was briefly employed in a furniture factory that produced architectural decorations. She left the job because the union did not permit women members. In 1892–93, Scudder found work with the sculptor Lorado Taft as one of his assistants, earning US$5 a day for her work on monumental sculptures for the upcoming World's Columbian Exposition in Chicago. (Scudder was one of a group of women sculptors and assistants working for Taft who were nicknamed the White Rabbits. Scudder was also commissioned to create a figure of Justice for the exposition's Illinois Building and modeled the Nymph of Wabash sculpture for the Indiana Building at the fair. For her work at the exposition, Scudder won a bronze medal, as well as US$1,000 from the citizens of Terre Haute, who expected to display her Nymph sculpture at the city's library.

After seeing Frederick W. MacMonnies's fountain "the Barge of State" at the World's Fair, Scudder decided to go to Paris in 1894, hoping to study with him. Scudder traveled to France with Zulime Taft (Lorado Taft's sister) and persuaded MacMonnies to hire her. At the age of twenty-five, Scudder became the first woman he employed at his atelier. Scudder assisted MacMonnies on projects such as his Shakespeare for the Library of Congress in Washington, D.C., in addition to studying at the Académie Vitti and at the Académie Colarossi. Scudder abruptly left MacMonnies's Paris studio in 1896, after a colleague gave her the inaccurate impression that he disapproved of her work. She returned to the United States and tried unsuccessfully to find work as a sculptor in Augustus Saint-Gaudens's studio in New York City.

=== First major commission ===
Through her friendship with fellow art student Matilda Auchincloss Brownell, whom she met during her trip home from France, and Brownell's father, Silas B. Brownell, the secretary of the New York Bar Association from 1878 to 1916, Scudder secured her first major commission in 1894. The US$750 she received to design a seal for the New York Bar Association provided her with the funds move to a better location in the city. The project also led to opportunities for steady work making plaques, portrait medallions, architectural ornamentation, and funerary urns, as well as sculpting. Scudder was especially adept at bas-relief portraiture, which became a specialty.

=== Return to Europe ===
In 1898 Scudder returned to Paris for more training, resuming drawing classes at Académie Colorossi. Accompanied by Brownell and Brownell's maid, the three women spent several years living in a home in Paris's Montparnasse neighborhood. Scudder and Brownell also spent the winter of 1899–1900 in Italy, where Scudder found fresh inspiration in Florence's ornamental fountain statuary and Italian Renaissance sculpture, especially Donatello's sculptures in the Bargello museum and the cherubic figures of Verrocchio in the Palazzo Vecchio.

=== Frog Fountain ===
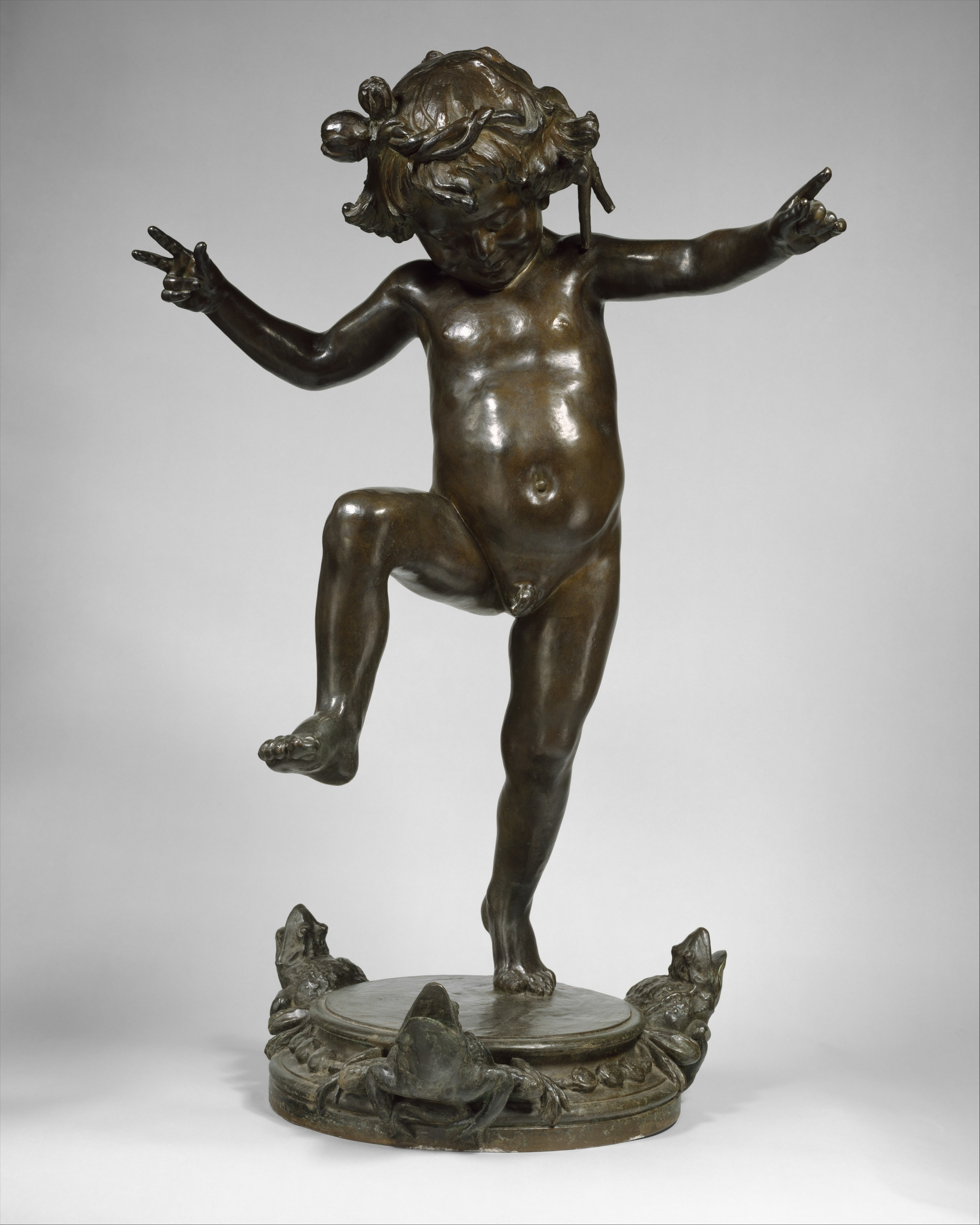
Frog Fountain. Bronze, 1901. In the collection of the Metropolitan Museum of Art

After her visit to Italy, Scudder returned to Paris in 1900 and began making amusing sculptures and fountains featuring lively children, which she called her "water babies." Beginning with Frog Fountain (1901), a figure of a young boy looking down upon frogs, Scudder launched her career as a prolific and successful maker of ornamental garden fountains and sculptures. Scudder brought Frog Fountain to New York City, where architect Stanford White bought a bronzed cast of it for his estate on Long Island.

Frog Fountain was her first work in a series of ornamental garden sculptures. Scudder produced five versions of this fountain, with the last one made for the Metropolitan Museum of Art in New York City. One of the other bronze versions of Frog Fountain made for a garden in the eastern United States was presented to the Woman's Department Club of Indianapolis, Indiana, in 1928. When the group's clubhouse was sold in 1964, the sculpture was donated to the Indianapolis Museum of Art. Two other bronze versions are on the grounds of private residences in Stonington, Connecticut, and Bar Harbor, Maine, but the original plaster of Frog Fountain has been destroyed.

Numerous smaller versions of the sculpture (6 inches (15 cm), (12.25 inches (31.1 cm), and (18.5 inches (47 cm) tall) were cast in bronze and intended for parlor or fountain pieces. In 1905 Stanford White commissioned a marble version of Frog Fountain with cattails for the James L. Breese estate home in Southampton, New York, Now called Whitefield Estate (Condominiums) but the marble Frog Baby fountain sculpture's location is unclear.

=== Other notable works ===
Scudder contributed a decorative figure representing Music to the 1900 Paris Exposition, and created other versions of garden fountains, most notably Tortoise Fountain (1908) and Young Diana, the latter of which earned an honorable mention at the Salon (Paris) of 1911. Stanford White, who became a personal friend of hers, regularly ordered sculptures from Scudder until his death in 1906. She created at least thirty fountains as commissions for the homes of wealthy Americans. These included Piping Pan (1911) for John D. Rockefeller, Shell Fountain (1913) for Edith Rockefeller McCormick, and other works for Henry Huntington.

In addition to commissions for sculptures and decorative fountains, Scudder designed a Congressional Gold Medal dated March 4, 1915, to honor Domício da Gama (Brazil's ambassador to the United States) for his services as a mediator between the United States and the leaders of opposing forces in Mexico. Scudder also received a commission from the Indiana Historical Commission to design a commemorative medal for Indiana's centennial in 1916 (the one hundredth anniversary of its admittance as the nineteenth state in the Union).

=== Exhibitions ===
During the early twentieth century, the height of her career, Scudder's works were exhibited in numerous public museums and at private galleries. Her first solo art show was held in 1913 at Theodore B. Starr galleries in New York City. In addition, Scudder's work was exhibited at several major national and international expositions during her lifetime: the World's Columbian Exposition (Chicago), 1893; Salon (Paris), 1899–1901, 1905, 1908, 1910–14, 1922, 1926, 1932, 1939; the Exposition Universelle (Paris), 1900; Pan-American Exposition (Buffalo, New York), 1901; Louisiana Purchase Exposition (St. Louis, Missouri), 1904; American Pavilion, International Exposition (Rome, Italy), 1911; and the Panama-Pacific International Exhibition (San Francisco, California), 1915. She also exhibited at the Hoosier Salon in Indiana in 1926, 1927, 1933, and 1934; the International Exposition (Paris), 1937; and at the 1939 New York World's Fair. Her work was also part of the sculpture event in the art competition at the 1928 Summer Olympics.

== Other interests ==
Scudder was a feminist and women's suffrage advocate who frequently marched in parades and demonstrations involved with women's issues. She became involved in women's suffrage movement in New York in 1915 and was a member of New York State Woman Suffrage Association. She was also a member of the art committee of the National American Women Suffrage Association. Scudder opposed separate exhibitions for male and female artists and disliked the separate sex and gender references used to describe artists. A New York Times feature article about Scudder in 1912 described her as a woman who "disdains her gender" and quoted her critical comments about women artists who were not serious about the profession. Scudder was more positive in her assessment of women's progress, arguing that women were as capable as men. She believed that women artists were strong enough to handle the physical demands of the work.

During World War I, Scudder was active in relief work in France as well as the United States. She offered her home at Ville d'Avray to the French government, who used it as a hospital. Scudder served as a Red Cross volunteer while renting an apartment in Paris, but returned to New York City before end of the war. She also continued to produce garden statuary during the war years. After an armistice was declared in 1918, Scudder divided her time between her studios in New York and in France.

Scudder was named a Chevalier (knight) of the French Legion of Honor in 1925 for her wartime service to France. Her sculpture, Victory, also known as Feminine Victory or Femina Victrix, which symbolized women's contributions during World War I, served as a model for a proposed National Suffrage Monument in Washington, D.C. In addition, it won a US$300 prize at the Hoosier Salon exhibition in her home state of Indiana in 1926 for Outstanding Piece of Sculpture.

== Personal life ==
A frequent traveler between New York and France, Scudder maintained art studios in New York City and in Paris, but preferred to live in Paris where her social circle grew to include Gertrude Stein, Alice B. Toklas, Mildred Aldrich, and Eva Mudocci. After American sculptor Malvina Hoffman arrived in Paris around 1910, she worked for a time as Scudder's studio assistant.

In 1913 Scudder purchased a home at Ville d'Avray on the outskirts of Paris and for several years made it her primary residence. Author Marion Cothren was Scudder's partner in Paris and New York during the final years of her life.

== Later years ==
By the 1920s, Scudder's sculptural forms became more "reserved," "rigid," and "stylized," in contrast to the "active, dynamic composition" of her earlier and best-known work. Despite this major change in her style, and her most productive years had passed, Scudder continued to sculpt and exhibit her work in the United States and in Europe. In her later years, but she also pursued painting, color theory, and for a brief time, architecture. Her autobiography, Modeling My Life, was published in 1925.

Scudder spent most of the last decade of her life in Paris, where she painted and continued to sculpt. In 1939, she returned to New York to reside with her companion, author Marion Benedict Cothren.

== Death and legacy ==
Scudder died of pneumonia on June 9, 1940, at the age of seventy, while vacationing in Rockport, Massachusetts.

In 1912, a feature article in the New York Times described Scudder as "one of the foremost woman sculptors of America." She is one of the first Americans to focus on bronze ornamental garden fountains. In addition to sculptures, Scudder also produced portrait medallions, architectural ornamentation, and funerary urns and painted in oil.

Scudder's art has been displayed at numerous national and international exhibitions from 1893 to 1937, as well as at public museums in the United States. These include the National Academy of Design, New York City; the Pennsylvania Academy of Fine Arts, Philadelphia; the Cincinnati Art Museum; Richmond Art Museum, Richmond, Indiana; Art Institute of Chicago; John Herron Art Institute and Indianapolis Museum of Art, Indianapolis; Dallas Art Association; National Museum of Women in the Arts, Washington, D.C., Minneapolis Institute of Art; San Diego Museum of Art. She also exhibited her work at shows for the Architectural League of New York, the National Sculpture Society, the National Association of Women Painters and Sculptors, the Hoosier Salon, and at private galleries.

== Honors and awards ==
- 1893, Bronze Medal, World's Columbian Exposition
- 1898, Honorable Mention, Sun Dial Competition
- 1904, Bronze Medal, Louisiana Purchase Exposition
- 1911, Honorable Mention, Paris Salon
- 1915, Silver Medal, Panama–Pacific International Exposition
- 1920, elected an associate of the National Academy of Design.
- 1925, named a Chevalier of the French Legion of Honor for her relief work during World War I
- 1937, Silver Medal, International Exposition, Paris
- Scudder is the first woman to have her work purchased by the Musée du Luxembourg.
- A portrait of Scudder in the National Academy of Design collection was painted by Margaret Bucknell Pecorini.

== Selected works ==
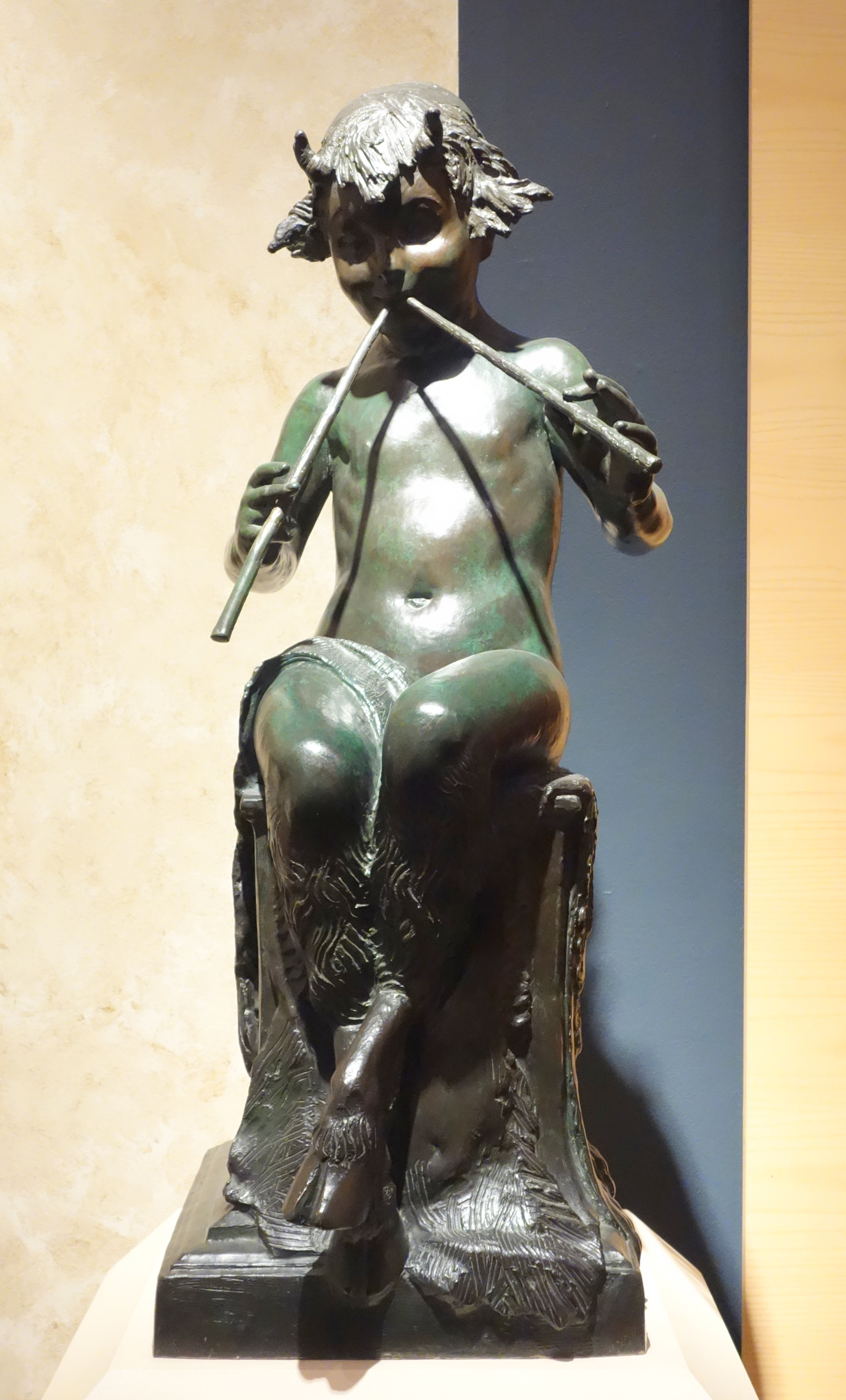
Seated Faun, 1924

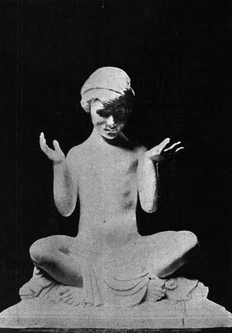
Bird Bath, 1921

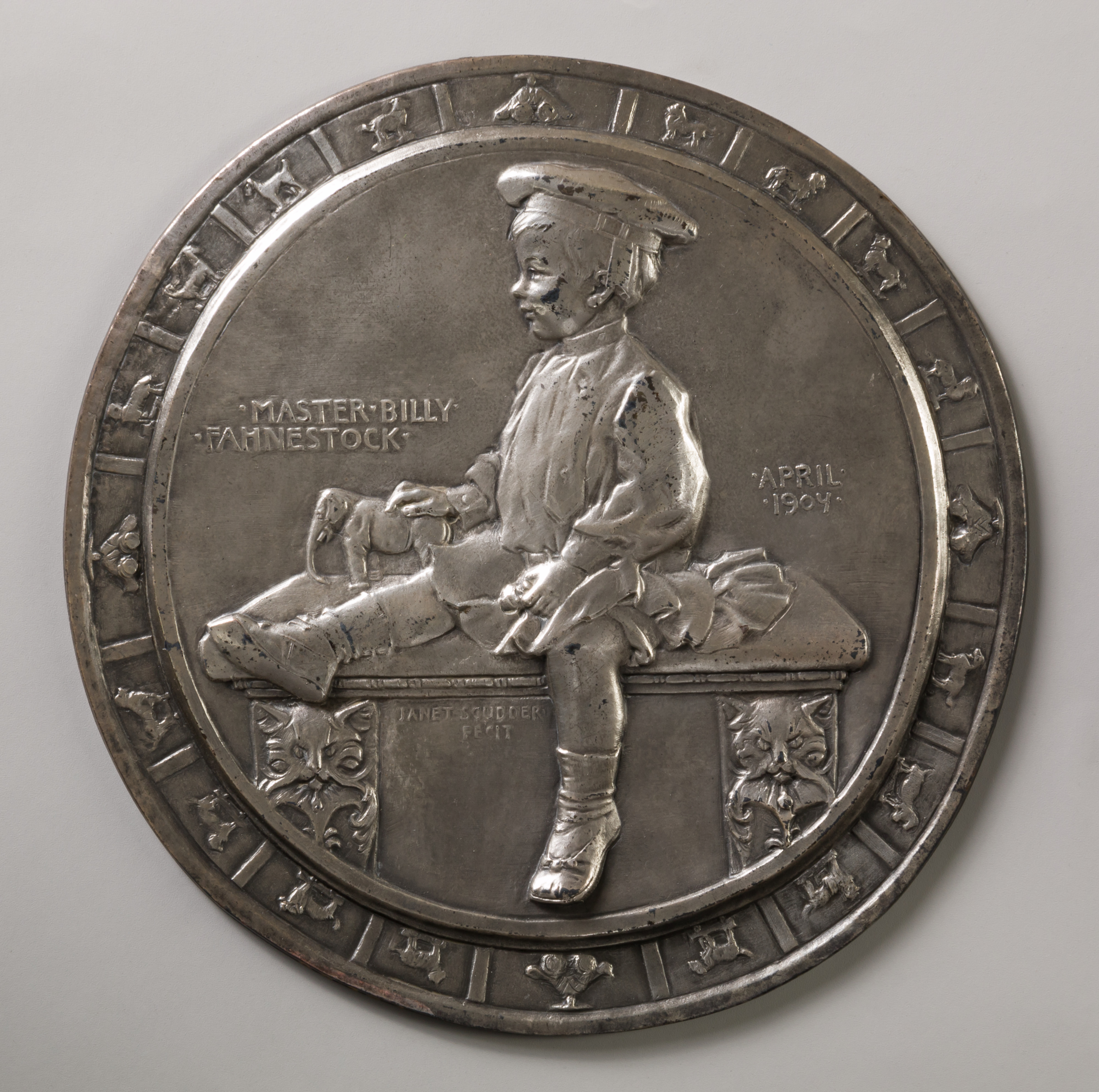
Portrait medallion: Master Billy Fahnestock

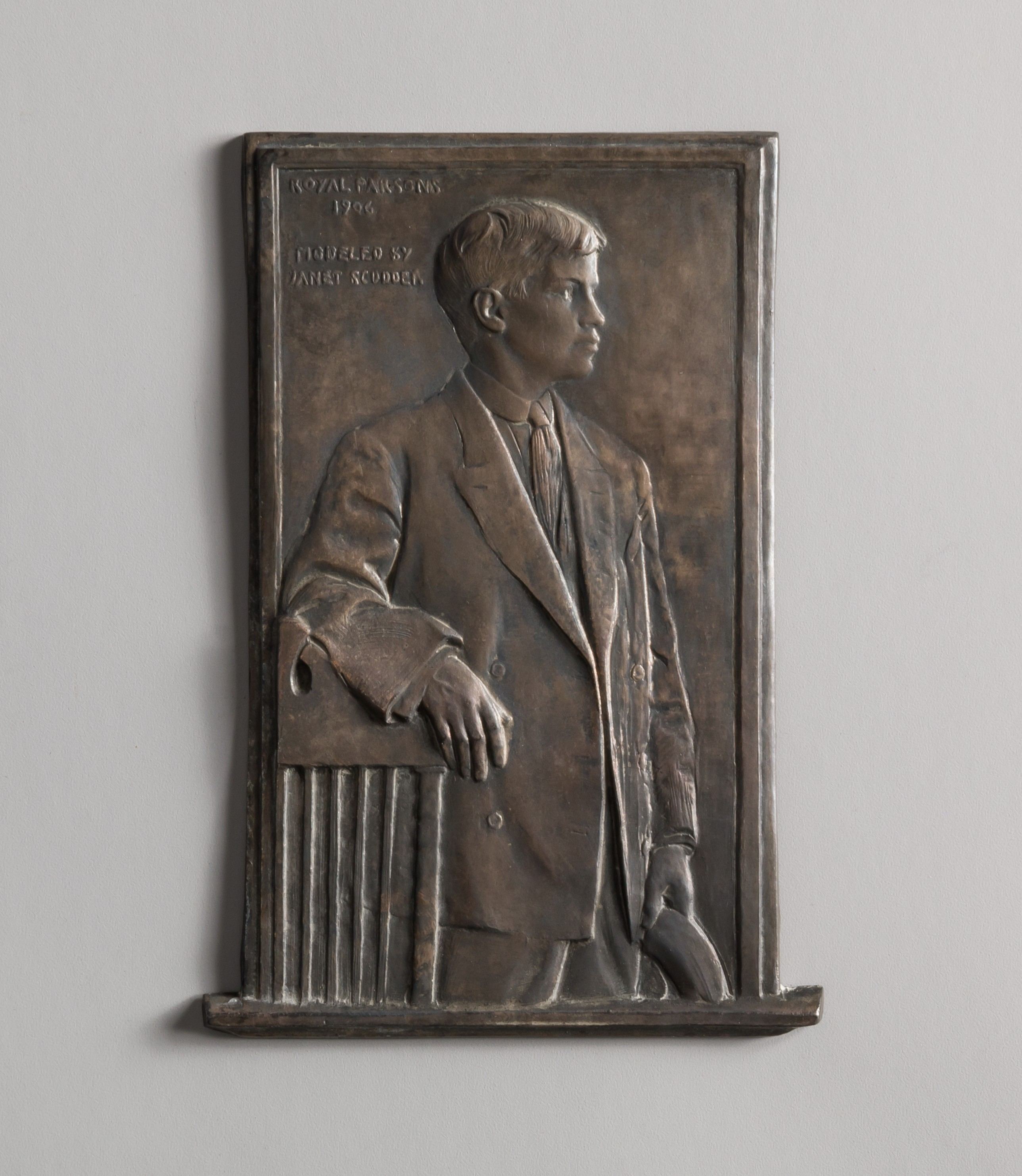
Bas-relief portrait: Royal Parsons

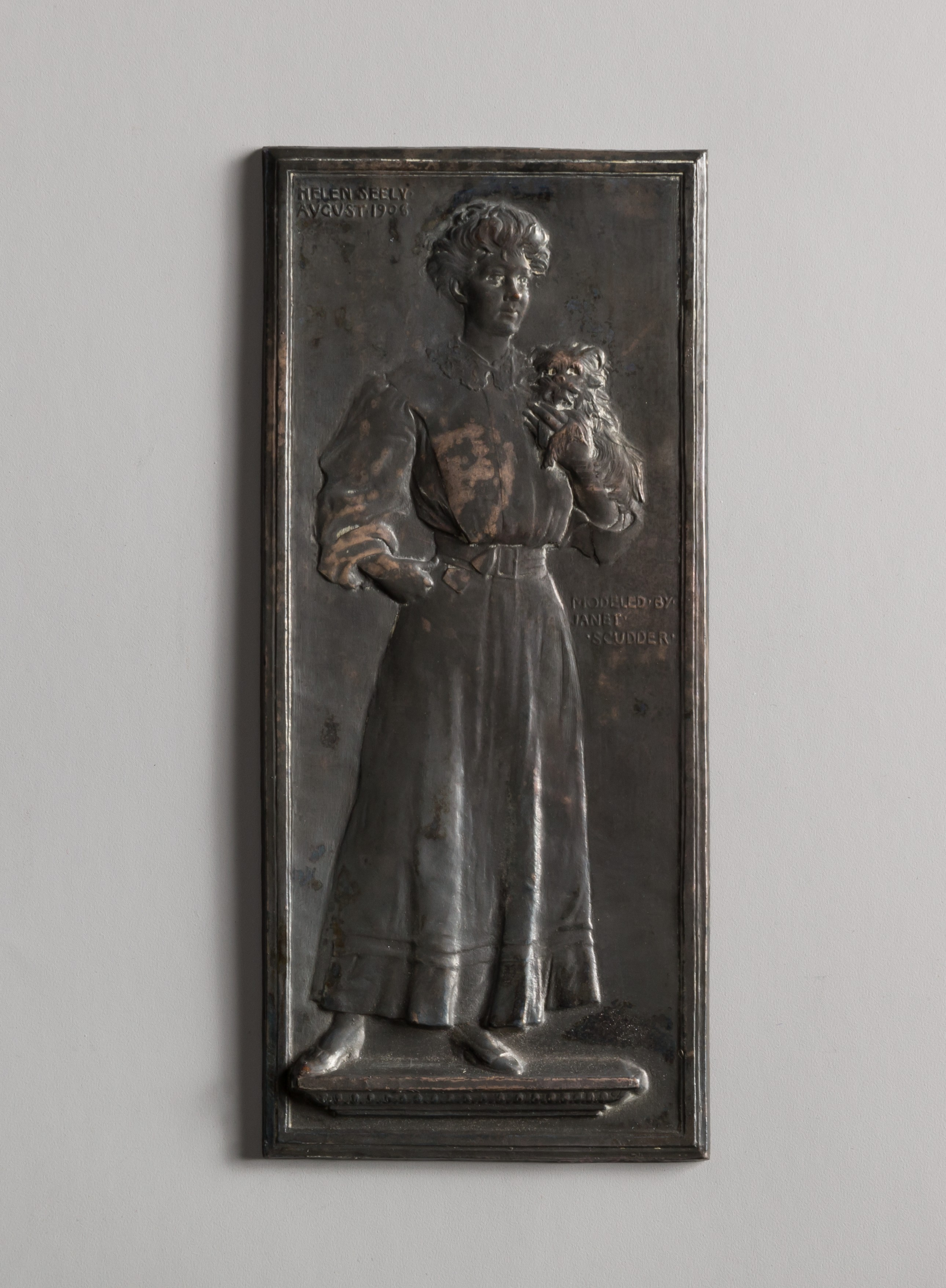
Bas-relief portrait: Helen Seely

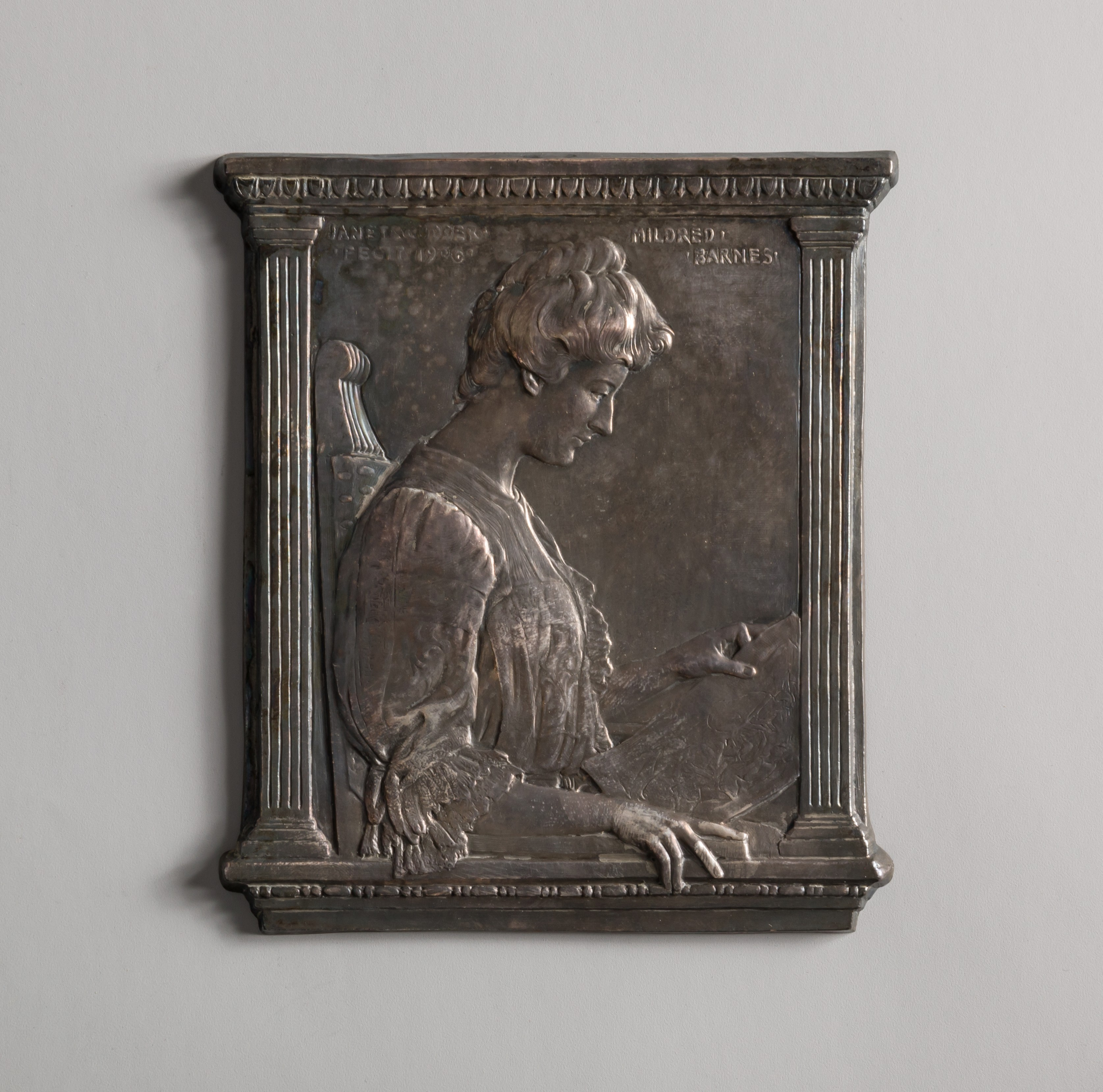
Bas-relief: Mildred Barnes

=== Publications ===
Modeling My Life (1925), an autobiography

== Public art collections ==
Scudder's work is represented in the collections of the Library of Congress, Washington, D.C.; the Metropolitan Museum of Art, New York; the Art Institute of Chicago, the Peabody Institute, Baltimore, Maryland; Brookgreen Gardens, Murrells Inlet, South Carolina; the Huntington Library, Art Gallery and Botanical Gardens, San Marino, California; the Indianapolis Museum of Art; the Indiana State Museum and the Indiana Historical Society, Indianapolis; Swope Art Museum, Terre Haute, Indiana; the Richmond Art Museum, Richmond, Indiana; the Musée d'Art Moderne de la Ville de Paris (transferred from Musée du Luxembourg), Paris; and the Musée d'Orsay, Paris.
