= Marion Cothren =

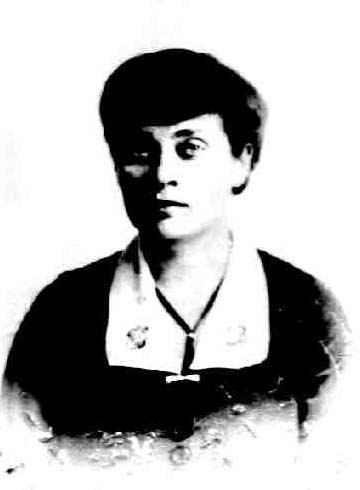
- Marion Benedict Cothren, 1918
- Born: Marion Benedict; 1880; Brooklyn, New York
- Died: 1949 (aged 68–69)
- Education: Vassar College, Columbia University
- Occupations: Writer, Attorney, Suffragist
- Spouse: Frank Howard Cothren (m. 1904–1914) his death

Marion Benedict Cothren (1880–1949) was an American suffrage and peace activist, lawyer, and children's author.

== Early life and education ==
Marion Benedict was born and raised in Brooklyn, New York by her parents William Marsh Benedict (a lawyer) and Grace Dillingham Benedict (a Vassar alumna). Marion was a 1900 graduate of Vassar College and pursued teacher training at Columbia University (MA 1901). She was admitted to the New York bar in 1909.

== Career ==
Marion Cothren went to Europe during World War I to work with the International Red Cross at Toul, France, an experience she credited with confirming her pacifism: "When I finally left France I took with me not only the pacifist's theoretical hatred of war, but a hatred born of an overwhelming sympathy for those who warred."

Marion B. Cothren was a member of the College Equal Suffrage League, the New York chapter of the Women's Trade Union League, and Heterodoxy, a feminist debating club based in Greenwich Village, among other clubwork. She was on the National Advisory Council of the National Woman's Party, one of the honorary chairs of the Woman's Peace Party when it was founded in 1915, and was one of the thirty American women to attend the International Congress of Women at the Hague that same year. Cothren was also a vocal supporter of Margaret Sanger, and served as president of the New York Women's Publishing Company, the publisher of Birth Control Review, from 1918 to 1923.

Marion Cothren's writings for children included Cher Ami: The Story of a Carrier Pigeon (1934), The Adventures of Dudley and Guilderoy (1941), Pigeon Heroes: Birds of War and Messengers of Peace (1944), Buried Treasure: The Story of America's Coal (1945),This is the Moon (1946), and Pictures of France by her Children (published posthumously, 1950). She also wrote The ABC of Voting, A Handbook of Government and Politics for the Women of New York State (1918) to instruct new female voters.

== Personal life ==
Marion Benedict married lawyer Frank Howard Cothren in 1904. They had one daughter, Frances (later Mrs. J. Roy Fuller). Marion Cothren was widowed in 1914 when her husband, who had been ill, overdosed on morphine. During the 1930s, she lived with sculptor Janet Scudder in Paris. She moved back to the US in 1940.

She died in 1949, age 69, accidentally falling from a cliff in Maine.
