= Coates College for Women =

College in Terre Haute, United States

Coordinates: 39°26′56.9″N 87°24′42.6″W

Coates College for Women was a liberal arts women's college in Terre Haute, Indiana. It opened in 1885 and closed in 1897.

== Founding ==
St. Mary-of-the-Woods College, founded in 1840, was originally the only women's college in the Terre Haute area. However, during an industrial boom of the 1860s and 1870s, several new colleges, mostly targeted at male students, opened in Terre Haute, including Indiana State Normal School in 1865 and the Rose Polytechnic Institute in 1874.

Recognizing that women were also in need of higher education, and also wanting to put a particular emphasis on the teaching of Christianity, Jane B. Coates of Greencastle purchased 13 acres in the Strawberry Hill section of Terre Haute and founded the Coates College for Women in 1885. The college opened that October to three students, with Rev. Dr. Laurence G. Hay of Indianapolis serving as president.

== Academics and culture ==
Coates aimed to be the "Wellesley of the Midwest" and modeled its curriculum after those of Wellesley and Vassar College. Eventually, three separate Bachelor's degree programs were offered. The college quickly gained a reputation for attracting excellent students, and many Coates graduates began to pursue graduate education at some of the most esteemed universities in the United States, including the University of Chicago.

Although Coates was nondenominational by design, the college's bylaws required at least two-thirds of the trustees to be Presbyterian. It also required that the Bible be used as "the chief textbook" in classes. All commencements were held at local Presbyterian churches. A "religious census" of Presbyterian colleges in 1897 noted that of the eleven students enrolled, seven were Presbyterian, two were Methodist, one was Baptist, and one was affiliated with the Disciples of Christ.

According to the College Calendar, the cost for the 1896–97 school year was $300. This included board, tuition, fuel, light and gymnasium privileges. Music classes were extra.

== Growth and decline ==
Enrollment grew quickly and had surpassed 100 students by 1889, even though the college had only three faculty members at its start. With its rapid growth, the need for more land was recognized. Jane Coates financed more purchasing and construction and also brought in more instructors, including noted sculptor Janet Scudder.

After the death of Jane Coates in 1891, however, the college's main source of funding became no longer available. Like many other colleges, Coates was severely impacted by the Panic of 1893. The founder's will became legally disputed by her heirs, making it even more difficult for the college to receive any funding. Enrollment also declined dramatically in the college's final years. As a result, Coates College closed after the conclusion of the 1896 - 1897 academic year.

== See also ==
- List of current and historical women's universities and colleges in the United States
