= Hayim Greenberg =

Philosopher of Judaism (1889–1953)

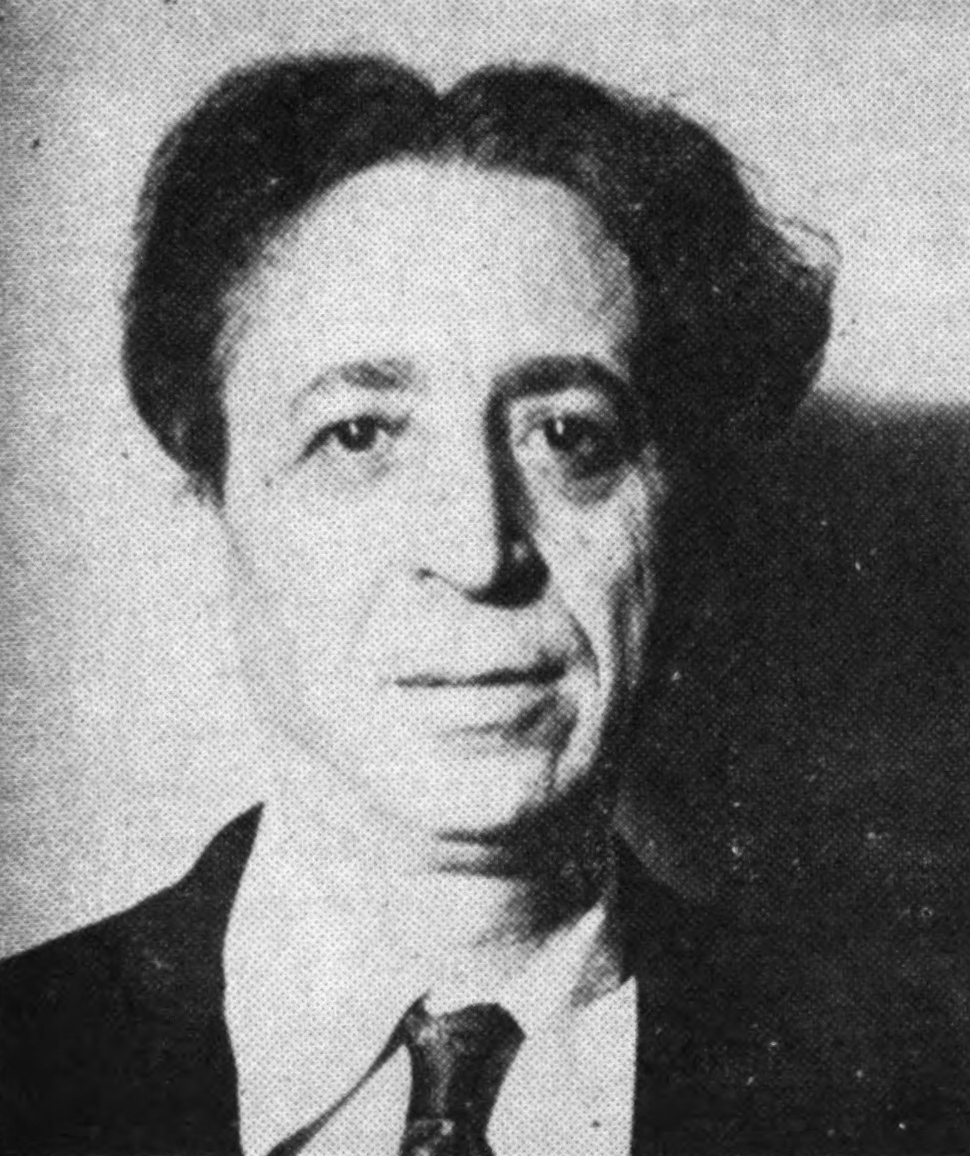
Hayim Greenberg

Hayim Greenberg (Hebrew: חַיִּים גרינברג 1889, Todirești, Beletsky Uyezd, Bessarabia – 1953, New York City) was a Jewish-American thinker and Labor Zionist thinker. He was the head of Poalei Zion and he was the editor along with Marie Syrkin of the important American Zionist journal Jewish Frontier. Its writers included David Ben-Gurion, Moshe Shertok, Sholom Asch and Maurice Samuel. He edited a literary journal, Kadima, in Kiev in 1920 with Koigen and Fischel Schneerson.

There are centers named after him in Argentina, United States, and Israel. Greenberg was one of the founders of Kinneret Day School, currently based in Riverdale, NY.

== Essays and Ideology ==
He created the ideological vision of the 1950s and 60's vision, where all American Jews of all creeds could unite behind the Zionist cause.

His seminal, still used today, is entitled "Patriotism and Plural Loyalties" wherein Greenberg discusses the accusation of dual loyalty directed at American Zionists. This essay has been compare to the recent multi-cultural work of K. Anthony Appiah in Insider/Outsider: American Jews and Multiculturalism.

He recast Zionism in an American idiom, Labor Zionists in the 1920s and 1930s drew upon America's own pioneering past, comparing the halutzim—the Labor movement's pioneers in Palestine—to the Pilgrim settlers of New England, to the cowboys of the Wild West, and even to Horatio Alger. American Jews viewed Palestine as the new Jewish frontier. Steeped in American mythology, they romanticized the settling of the ancient Jewish homeland as a celebration of “independence, adventure, industry, physical strength, youthful optimism, surety of purpose and expansion.”

Zionism is more than the expression of a positive attitude to Israel; it is also more than Aliyah. Zionist ideology represents an all-encompassing approach to the problems of the Jewish People. Zionism derives from Judaism and can not be separated from it. It finds its fullest expression in the individual for whom it represents the culmination of a sound Jewish education.

Without such education, Zionism may be a doctrine, a convincing theory, a program, a plan, an undertaking of desperate urgency, an appeal to sentiment, a noble humanitarian enterprise, but not a profound creative experience.... [Jewish education] is not necessarily limited to formal schooling or to a systematic course of studies. It may be, and often is, obtained through a variety of informal channels.

Becoming a Zionist means more than the acquisition of a body of knowledge of Jewish history, of Hebrew, of developments in Israel. Becoming a Zionist means adopting an action-oriented ideology a way of perceiving the Jewish people and its problems, A change from a non-Zionist to a Zionist position involves a change in perception, values and valences, and action. Such total change is generally achieved by a person's acceptance of a group with the appropriate ideology as his source of reference.

In 1942 when news of the Holocaust reached America, he was involved in bringing the news to the public.

When 180 chaverim of Habonim gathered for the national convention at the Hechalutz farm in Cream Ridge, New Jersey. On the opening night, Hayim Greenberg pointed to the loss of moral values and principles, the loss of the sense that "values are valuable," as perhaps the basic cause of the deep crisis of our civilization. Continuing his prior rejection of European socialism, he said, In the post-war world there must be no separation between freedom and equality such as brought about the rise of the totalitarian states. The soldier who has a tragic function to perform is a passing phenomenon. The permanent elements of civilization are the constructive ones—the workers, the farmers, the builders.

== Events ==
When population transfer was proposed in 1935–6 by Golda Myerson, Moshe Shertok and Ya'akov Riftin, Hayim Greenberg delivered a very short address at the 20th Zionist Congress. He said that the transfer of Arabs was not feasible. They will not voluntarily leave and we cannot force them. On the other hand, if they remained they would listen to the agitation of their Arab leaders. Greenberg did not have a solution to this dilemma.

He was in favor of keeping Yiddish alive, he wrote literature in Yiddish, and sought to institute a chair in Yiddish at Hebrew University. He was also involved in attempting to save Yiddish poets.

Haim Greenberg to Ben-Zion Dinaburg (Dinur), 25 October 1950, The Hebrew University Archives, file 22730, 1951.

In 1943 he was visited in New York by representatives of the Assyrian nation, one of the small ethnic minorities without rights in modern Iraq, who asked: "It appears you Jews are about to get yourselves a state," the visitor said. "Can you spare a corner of it for an old neighbor?"

He was instrumental in gaining the support of several Latin American countries for the establishment of the State of Israel.

== Response to Gandhi ==
When Gandhi encouraged Jews in Nazi Germany to take a course of non-violence, there were many Jewish responses, most notably Martin Buber, but also Greenberg.

He argued that just as Gandhi fought for civil rights and to change the Indian caste system by law, so too the Jews in Europe should not accept legal discrimination.

"We Jews strive to redeem ourselves from our state of "untouchability". We seek bread, work, freedom and human dignity... Zionism is not only a movement for the hungry and persecuted. It draws to itself increasing numbers of courageous Jews even in those countries which are free from brutal anti-Semitism and where Jews are not stigmatized as "unclean"."

On the charge of colonization in Palestine, he responded: "In recent history, Zionism is the first instance of colonization free from imperialist ambition or the desire to rule any part of the population."

You have to fight the "Do that which is in your power to end the venomous anti-Jewish propaganda amid the millions of Mohammedans in India."

== Literary works ==
- The Inner Eye 1953 New York, Jewish Frontier Association (1953- Library of Congress control number 54021458)

== Literature ==
- Hayim Greenberg anthology (Marie Syrkin; 1968)
  - Greenberg, Hayim, 1889–1953. Anthology. Selected and with an introd. by Marie Syrkin. Detroit, Wayne State University Press, 1968. 342 p. 21 cm. Library of Congress Control Number 68013147
    - See review by Arthur Hertzberg in Commentary, Vol. 48, No. 3, September 1969 Hertzberg, Arthur
- Hayim Greenberg, "Sabbatai Zevi- The Messiah as Apostate," in Voices from the Yiddish, ed. Irving Howe and Eliezer Greenberg, pp. 148–160
- Carole Kessner's The "Other" New York Intellectuals offers a wider view of this Jewish intellectual scene from the 1920s through the 1950s.
- Eli Lederhendler “Hayim Greenberg,” in John A. Garraty and Mark C. Carnes (eds.), American National Biography, (New York: Oxford University Press, 1999), vol. 9: 516–518
- Rafael Medoff "Retribution Is Not Enough": The 1943 Campaign by Jewish Students to Raise American Public Awareness of the Nazi Genocide Holocaust and Genocide Studies, 1997 11(2):171-189;
- "A Tale of Two Critics", Stephen J. Whitfield; American Jewish History, Vol. 86, 1998
- Raider, Mark A. (ed.), The Essential Hayim Greenberg : Essays and Addresses on Jewish Culture, Socialism, and Zionism. Tuscaloosa : The University of Alabama Press, 2016.
