= Syrkin =

Syrkin (Russian: Сыркин) is a surname. In Slavic countries it is reserved for males, while its feminine counterpart is Syrkina. Notable people with the surname include:

- Daniel Syrkin (born 1971), Israeli cinema and TV director and screenwriter
- Marie Syrkin (1899–1989), American author, schoolteacher and university professor, daughter of Nachman
- Nachman Syrkin (1868–1924), Russian-born political theorist
