= Maurice Samuel =

American novelist

- Born: Maurice Samuel; February 8, 1895; Măcin, Tulcea County, Romania
- Died: May 4, 1972 (aged 77); Manhattan, New York City, U.S.
- Education: Victoria University
- Occupation: Novelist
- Spouses: Marie Syrkin (m. 1917, annulled): Gertrude Kahn (div. 1961); Edith Brodsky (1962–1972)
- Children: 2
- Writing career
- Genres: Literary fiction non-fiction

Maurice Samuel (February 8, 1895 – May 4, 1972) was a Romanian-born British and American novelist, translator and lecturer of Jewish heritage. He was a prominent Jewish Humanist and Zionist intellectual. His best-known and most commercially successful work was The World of Sholom Aleichem (1943), and for which he was awarded the Anisfield-Wolf Book Award. The non-fiction book deals with Jewish life in Russia in the nineteenth century.

In 1956, he was awarded the 1955 Stephen Wise Award of the American Jewish Congress for his “significant contributions over three decades” to Jewish education and culture."

In 1964, Robert Alter wrote of his profile in Commentary: "For more than three decades, Maurice Samuel has been a kind of one-man educational movement in American Jewish life. Anyone with even a passing interest in the East European Jewish milieu, Yiddish and Hebrew literature, Zionism, the future of American Jewry, the nature of anti-Semitism, the role of Judaism in the West, is likely to have read at least one of Samuel’s books."

In 1967, he was awarded the B’nai B’rith Jewish Heritage Award, a literary prize given annually to a writer who “makes a positive contribution to contemporary literature by his authentic interpretation of Jewish life and values."

Samuel received the Itzik Manger Prize for Yiddish literature posthumously in 1972.

== Early life ==
Born in Măcin, Tulcea County, Romania, to Isaac Samuel and Fanny Acker, Samuel moved to Paris with his family at the age of five and one year later, the family relocated to Manchester in England, living in an immigrant district. He studied at the Victoria University on a 3-year scholarship but did not graduate. He attended classes in chemistry with Chaim Weizmann (with whom he became friends), physics with Ernest Rutherford and a mathematics class with Horace Lamb but found he had neither talent nor interest in the subjects. Flinders Petrie lectured on Egyptology and Samuel recalls that James Frazer (who wrote "The Golden Bough") would occasionally visit the university to give lectures on anthropology. He also took courses in French and English literature as well as courses related to civil service requirements.

He emigrated to the United States in 1914, settling in New York City's Lower East Side. During his adolescence he had scant interest in his Jewish heritage and instead became engrossed in non-Jewish literature and socialism. His interest in his native Yiddish was renewed when he was drafted into an infantry regiment on the Lower East Side, where he was required to translate commandments to fellow Jewish soldiers with a limited level of English. Afterwards, he served with the American Expeditionary Forces in Bordeaux in France during the First World War. In 1919 he worked as an interpreter at the Versailles Peace Conference. He also assisted the Reparations Commission in Berlin and Vienna, and served with the Morgenthau Commission investigating pogroms in Poland. He stayed in Europe until 1921, also taking Hebrew lessons in France from a Palestinian Jew.

His parents spoke Yiddish at home and he developed strong attachments to the Jewish people and the Yiddish language at early age. This later became the motivation for many of the books he wrote as an adult.

== Writing career ==
A Jewish intellectual and writer, Samuel was known for his role as a polemicist and campaigner against anti-Semitism. Most of his work concerns itself with Judaism or the Jew's role in history and modern society. Samuel was a vocal Zionist and a champion of Yiddish culture. Several of Samuel's works explore Zionist ideals and celebrate Yiddish literature. Six of Samuel's books examine anti-Semitism as rooted in Western traditions of competition and aggression — contrasting sharply with Judaism's emphasis on non-violence and cooperation.

After returning to the United States in 1920, he began writing for Der Tog, a Yiddish-language newspaper in New York City.

Samuel's early fiction, though not explicitly focused on Jewish themes, already hinted at his later interests through its portrayal of war's impact on individuals and the struggles of immigrant life in America. His first novel, The Outsider (1921), centers on demobilized soldiers in postwar Paris. Two years later, Whatever Gods (1923) follows Arthur Winner, a second-generation Austrian-American who rejects his family's shoe business in pursuit of independence. After working in Ohio, Arthur ultimately returns home, having learned that meaningful change comes not from standing apart but from engaging with society, achieving success, and using one's position to improve both self and community.

In 1924, he published You Gentiles, a non-fiction account which seeks to explore the core distinctions between Jews and Gentiles, examining how these differences relate to the phenomenon of anti-Semitism and considering whether a resolution to the tensions they produce is possible. Samuel won praise from J. Donald Adams in The New York Times: "The most striking quality of Mr. Samuel's book is its exceptional frankness." Adams added that the book "is soundly reasoned and much that is provocative of thought".

In 1927, he published I, the Jew. The non-fiction account tracks his intellectual journey from youthful certainty, through periods of doubt and rejection, toward a renewed and more expansive conviction. Raised in England and deeply attached to its culture, he long believed himself fully English, despite having been born in Romania. He later recognised that he could not share the inherited social past that defined English identity, prompting what he described as a revolt against “this tyrannous past.” His reflections led him to question scientific, religious, and political claims before arriving at the view that peace requires balancing loyalty to one's own group with respect for others. Central to this evolution was his growing affirmation of his Jewish identity. A committed Zionist, Samuel regarded the movement as “in the forefront of fine human achievements” and hoped that a Jewish homeland—shaped by a tradition that had endured without reliance on war—might model a more ethical form of collective life.

In August 1939, he sailed to Europe on special assignment for the New York Post.

In 1944, he was awarded the Anisfield-Wolf Book Award, administered by The Saturday Review of Literature for his non-fiction work, The World of Sholom Aleichem (1943), which deals with Jewish life in Russia in the nineteenth century. The citation accompanying the award described it as "a clear portrayal of a distinctive group of individuals sometimes irrational, often whimsical, occasionally irritating, but always alive and genuinely human." It was also his most commercially successful work, reprinted every two or three years.

In the same year, he published Harvest in the Desert, a chronicle of progress in Mandate Palestine, where the Jewish population had risen to 600,000. Samuel describes a collective nation‑building effort driven largely by ordinary workers rather than philanthropists. He highlights the purchase of land through the Jewish National Fund and the extensive labour involved in draining swamps, irrigating fields, constructing roads and housing, and establishing agricultural communes that challenged stereotypes about Jewish manual and collective labour. Urban growth accompanied this development, with new industries, schools, hospitals, and the expansion of the Histadrut labour federation. He also argues that, despite these achievements, the Jewish population remained constrained by British policy. Drawing on contemporary critiques, he accuses the British administration of inconsistency and inaction during periods of unrest, and points to opposition from the Grand Mufti and local elites who feared social and economic change.

Writing in the June 1947 issue of Commentary, Meyer Levin argued that the literary careers of himself, Samuel Ludwig Lewisohn, Daniel Fuchs, and Irving Fineman had been constrained by limited reader and publishing‑industry interest in works that engaged with Jewish or Zionist themes. However, Irving Howe underscores Maurice Samuel's literary significance by emphasizing his unique position between two cultural spheres: the American literary establishment and the Yiddish intellectual tradition. Rather than belonging fully to either, Samuel operated within the liminal space that connected them. Howe commends him as “the rare kind of literary man who established connections between two orders of sensibility and thereby modified each of them a little.”

In 1948, Samuel wrote Prince of the Ghetto, about I. L. Peretz, a Polish Jewish writer and playwright writing in Yiddish. Samuel's presentation of Peretz includes retellings of his major stories, noting that their cultural depth resists straightforward translation but offers readers a vivid portrait of the vanished, Torah‑centred Jewish communities of eastern Europe. Peretz's tales draw on folklore, moral reflection, and imaginative fantasy, depicting a world where the boundaries between earthly and spiritual realms are fluid. Although deeply devoted to his people, Peretz was aware of the tensions between his Jewish heritage and his European intellectual formation, a conflict Samuel argues was eased through Peretz's admiration for Hasidism. In his Commentary review, Leslie Fiedler wrote that "On the whole, he [Samuel] has skillfully disentangled the living Peretz from the 19th-century corpse of the same name: the optimistic believer in material progress, science, and rationalism, the popularizing lecturer, the despiser of ritual." In 1948, Samuel and S. Y. Agnon were awarded the annual Louis Lamed Fund prizes, which recognized the two best Jewish books published in English in the United States. Samuel received the award for The Prince of the Ghetto.

He also assisted Chaim Weizmann, President of Israel, to write his autobiography, Trial and Error (1949). In 1950, he published The Gentleman and the Jew. Within this autobiographical account of his intellectual formation, Samuel reflects on Jewish history, ethical traditions, and the significance of the Hebrew Bible, while also addressing the complexities of Jewish nationalism in relation to Zionism and the modern State of Israel. He frames these discussions through a broader interpretive scheme that contrasts what he sees as distinct Hebrew and non‑Hebrew value systems, using this distinction to organise his reading of Jewish historical experience.David Daiches reviewed the book in the December 1950 issue of Commentary, praising it as "fascinating and provocative." Daiches concluded "it must suffice to recommend the book most warmly to Jews and Christians alike as a brilliant and searching analysis of some of the values of civilization."

In 1963, he published the memoir Little Did I Know: Recollections and Reflections. The collection of essays explore Jewish identity, arguing that despite its challenges, Jewish life carries profound value and meaning. The book was praised by Maurice Edelman in The New York Times as a "sane, witty and challenging book [that] offers a bracing therapy."

In 1968, Samuel published Light on Israel, about the post-Six-Day War nation. He wrote of his ambitions for Israel as an important "culture producing unit" and that her military victory "focused the world's attention on her nonmilitary achievements, without which her victory would have been impossible." Chaim Potok praised the book in The New York Times: "It is a fine book, written with the grace and wit and controlled passion we have come to expect from Maurice Samuel, and filled with keen and subtle insights."

In 1971, he published In Praise of Yiddish. Lucy Dawidowicz reviewed the non-fiction book in the December 1971 issue of Commentary.

He also wrote more conventional fiction, such as The Web of Lucifer, which takes place during the Borgias' rule of Renaissance Italy, and the fantasy science-fiction novel The Devil that Failed. Samuel also wrote the nonfiction King Mob under the pseudonym "Frank K. Notch". He and his work received acclaim within the Jewish community during his lifetime. He received the Itzik Manger Prize for Yiddish literature posthumously in 1972. He was also a well known radio personality appearing in discussions on the NBC summer program "Eternal Light: The Words We Live By" from 1953 to 1971 alongside Mark van Doren where the two discussed the literary and cultural impact of the Bible.

== Zionist activism ==
Between 1922 and 1928, he was a paid official of the Zionist Organization of America, travelling extensively, visiting major Jewish communities across the United States, and became a sought‑after speaker on Zionism and a wide range of Jewish cultural and historical topics. He later served as a special correspondent to the Jewish Telegraphic Agency during visits to Mandate Palestine, reporting on the 1929 Palestine riots.

He was a strong proponent of Cultural Zionism: "If our national existence is to be different from the national existence of the Goyim (and otherwise we are Goyim), Zionism must be holy and spiritual, must be a cult, not merely an organization, but a faith, a mighty inward pulse, must be identified with the Bible. At present it is an imitation (and result) of the wave of nationalism which came in Europe in the Nineteenth Century."

On 26 January 1931, The New York Times reported on his address to the Reform Free Synagogue congregation at Carnegie Hall. Samuel highlighted a struggle taking place in Mandate Palestine "between the progressive Jewish force in the country, known as Zionism, and the British Government allied with the Arab landowner and usurer." He expanded: "The only hope that there is of building up the country, for Arabs and Jews alike, consists in building up a modern social economy - in introducing modern relations between labor and capital; in raising a standard of living so that a decent home market is created. There cannot exist in one country two racial standards of living and of social relationships, or two political systems separated by a gulf of centuries."

In February 1934, a Jewish Telegraphic Agency noticed reported that Samuel, recently returned from Mandate Palestine, would speak at the Jewish Club on West 73rd Street about the settlement and economic integration of German Jewish refugees in the Jewish National Home.

In May 1934, at a United Jewish Appeal event held at Temple Israel of the City of New York, Samuel predicted that as many as 400,000 Jews, including 100,000 from Germany, would immigrate to Mandate Palestine over the following decade. Addressing an audience of more than 300 people, he argued that large‑scale settlement in the Jewish National Home constituted a direct response to Nazi persecution. Samuel noted that Palestine had absorbed over 38,000 Jewish immigrants in 1933—more than any other country—and described this development as offering both practical relief for refugees and broader psychological reassurance for Jewish communities worldwide.

In December 1950, Samuel served as one of the conveners of the second National Assembly for Labor Israel in New York City, a major gathering of American Jewish leaders focused on the theme of “The Jews of Israel and of America – Two Years Experience in Attitudes and Relationships.” Samuel was joined by fellow conveners, Prof. Horace M. Kallen, Dr. Mordecai Kaplan, Max Lerner, Rabbi James G. Heller and Dr. Hayim Greenberg.

== Personal life ==
Samuel was married three times. On August 31, 1917, he married 18 year old Marie Syrkin just prior to serving in the United States Army during World War I, however her father, Nahum Syrkin disapproved of Samuel's prospects and quickly arranged to have the marriage annulled. He did allow the couple to remain engaged and they maintained a relationship via correspondence. It eventually cooled and Marie finally broke it off while she was enrolled at Cornell University in February 1919.

His second marriage to Getrude Kahn produced two children and ended in divorce in 1961. In 1962, he married Edith Brodsky, who survived him. The couple lived at 515 West End Avenue on the Upper West Side in Manhattan.

Samuel died at Mount Sinai Beth Israel in New York City in 1972 at the age of 77, after a long illness. His funeral service was held at Riverside Memorial Chapel, a Jewish funeral home on the Upper West Side.

== List of works ==
=== Fiction ===
- The Outsider (1921)
- Whatever Gods (1923)
- Beyond Woman (1934)
- Web of Lucifer (1947)
- The Devil that Failed (1952)
- The Second Crucifixion (1960)

=== Non-fiction ===
- You Gentiles (1924)
- I, the Jew (1927)
- What Happened in Palestine: The Events of August, 1929: Their Background and Significance
- King Mob: A Study of the Present-Day Mind (1931)
- On the Rim of the Wilderness: The Conflict in Palestine (1931)
- Jews on Approval (1932)
- The Great Hatred (1940)
- The World of Sholom Aleichem (1943)
- Harvest in the Desert (1944)
- Haggadah of Passover (1947) (translation)
- Prince of the Ghetto (1948)
- The Gentleman and the Jew (1950)
- Level Sunlight (1953)
- The Professor And The Fossil (1956)
- Certain People of the Book (1955)
- Little Did I Know: Recollections and Reflections (1963)
- Blood Accusation: the Strange History of the Beiliss Case (1966)
- Light on Israel (1968)
- In Praise of Yiddish (1971)
- In the Beginning, Love: Dialogues on the Bible (collaboration) (1975)
