= The Jews Should Keep Quiet =

2019 non-fiction book by Rafael Medoff

The Jews Should Keep Quiet: Franklin D. Roosevelt, Rabbi Stephen S. Wise, and the Holocaust
- First edition
- Author: Rafael Medoff
- Genre: Non-fiction
- Publisher: Jewish Publication Society
- Publication date: 2019

The Jews Should Keep Quiet: Franklin D. Roosevelt, Rabbi Stephen S. Wise, and the Holocaust is a 2019 book by Rafael Medoff examining the complex relationship between Franklin D. Roosevelt and the Jews.

== See also ==
- FDR and the Jews
- Report to the Secretary on the Acquiescence of This Government in the Murder of the Jews
- War Refugee Board
