= Stephen J. Whitfield =

American historian

Stephen J. Whitfield (born 1942) is the Max Richter Professor Emeritus of American Civilization at Brandeis University, where he has taught since receiving his doctorate there in 1972 until 2016. His main interests include 20-century American political and cultural history and American Jewish history.

Stephen Whitfield has also served as a visiting professor at the Hebrew University of Jerusalem, the Catholic University of Louvain, Belgium, the University of Paris IV (The Sorbonne) and LMU Munich.

Since 1976 Whitfield was associated with the Southern Jewish Historical Society and he published a series of essays on the history of the Jews of Southern United States.

He earned the following degrees: Brandeis University, Ph.D. (1972), Yale University, M.A., Tulane University, B.A.

== Personal life ==
Whitfield is the son of Jewish immigrants, a German-born father and Romanian-born mother, who escaped Europe in 1938, before the Holocaust. The parents married in 1940. Stephen was born in 1942 and his only sibling (Ronald) was born in 1945. The family belonged to the Reform synagogue.

== Books ==
- 2020: Learning on the Left: Political Profiles of Brandeis University
- 2003: Fiddling with Sholem Aleichem: A History of Fiddler on the Roof
- 1999, 2001: In Search of American Jewish Culture
- 1991, 1996: The Culture of the Cold War''
- 1988, 1991: Death in the Delta; The Story of Emmett Till
- 1988, 1996: American Space, Jewish Time
- 1984: Voices of Jacob, Hands of Esau: Jews in American Life and Thought
- 1984: New World Crossword Dictionary
- 1984: A Critical American: The Politics of Dwight Macdonald
- 1980: Into the Dark: Hannah Arendt and Totalitarianism
- 1974: Scott Nearing: Apostle of American Radicalism (Whitfield's 1972 Ph.D. thesis)
