= You Gentiles =

1924 book by Maurice Samuel

- Author: Maurice Samuel
- Language: English
- Genre: Religion, political science
- Publisher: Harcourt, Brace & Co.
- Publication date: 1924
- Publication place: United States
- Media type: Print
- Text: You Gentiles at Wikisource

You Gentiles is a 1924 book written by Romanian-born British and American-Jewish author Maurice Samuel.

== Reviews ==
- "Jew and Gentile; A Review by J. DONALD ADAMS YOU GENTILES. By Maurice Samuel. 221 pp. New York: Harcourt, Brace & Co". The New York Times. July 7, 1924.
- Neumann, Emanuel (September 5, 1924). "You Gentiles: My Reaction to Maurice Samuel's Latest Book". National Library of Israel. The American Jewish World.
- Carl A. Williams (March 1925). "Review of: You Gentiles. By Maurice Samuel". Social Forces. Vol. 3, no. 3. pp. 558–559. doi:10.2307/3005035.
- David Norman Smith (1996). "The Social Construction of Enemies: Jews and the Representation of Evil". Sociological Theory. Vol. 14, no. 3. pp. 203–240. doi:10.2307/3045387.
