= Charles Reznikoff =

American poet (1894–1976)

- Born: August 31, 1894; Brooklyn, New York, U.S.
- Died: January 22, 1976 (aged 81); New York, U.S.
- Spouse: Marie Syrkin (m. 1930)
- Writing career
- Notable works: Testimony: The United States (1885–1915), Recitative
- Notable awards: Morton Dauwen Zabel Prize
- Movement: Objectivist poets

Charles Reznikoff (August 31, 1894 – January 22, 1976) was an American poet best known for his long work, Testimony: The United States (1885–1915), Recitative (1934–1979). The term Objectivist was coined for him. The multi-volume Testimony was based on court records and explored the experiences of immigrants, black people and the urban and rural poor in the United States in the late nineteenth and early twentieth centuries. He followed this with Holocaust (1975), based on court testimony about Nazi death camps during World War II.

In 1930, Reznikoff married Marie Syrkin, a prominent Zionist and friend and biographer of Golda Meir. Although they did not live together at all times during the marriage, it lasted until Reznikoff's death.

When Louis Zukofsky was asked by Harriet Monroe to provide an introduction to what became known as the Objectivist issue of Poetry magazine, he contributed his essay "Sincerity and Objectification: With Special Reference to the Work of Charles Reznikoff". This established the name of the loose-knit group of second-generation modernist poets and the two characteristics of their poetry: sincerity and objectification.

== Early years ==
Charles Reznikoff was born in 1894 in Brownsville, a largely Jewish neighborhood in the New York City borough of Brooklyn, the son of immigrants Sarah Yetta (Wolvovsky) Reznikoff and Nathan Reznikoff, who fled the Russian Empire and its pogroms. His Hebrew name was Ezekial, after his maternal grandfather. His father established a family business manufacturing hats, and Reznikoff briefly worked there as a salesman in his 20s. Entering Boys High School young, he was 15 years old when he graduated and had already started writing poetry. He spent a year studying journalism in graduate school at the Missouri School of Journalism, where Reznikoff realized he was interested in writing more than reporting news. He entered the New York University School of Law in 1912 and after graduating in 1915 was admitted to the bar in 1916. He practiced law during the period 1916–1918. In 1918, as the United States had entered the Great War, he entered officer training school; however, he did not see active service before the end of the war.

Reznikoff worked for a time for his family's business as a hat salesman. He worked for a legal publishing house, where he wrote summaries of court records for legal reference books. This experience was to prove integral to his later writing.

From his teens, Reznikoff had been writing poetry, much of it influenced by the Imagists. He published his own work, using a second-hand press for which he set the type himself. Throughout his writing life, Reznikoff was always concerned to ensure that his work was published, even at his own expense. This appears to have been inspired by a family story of his grandfather, an unpublished Hebrew poet, whose manuscripts were destroyed after his death, for fear of their falling into Russian hands.

== Objectivist poet ==
A year after the Objectivist issue of Poetry was published in 1931, Reznikoff, Zukofsky and George Oppen set up "To Publishers" and later the Objectivist Press, essentially to publish their own work. Reznikoff had had some success with his 1930 novel By the Waters of Manhattan, and the new press published three titles by him, two that gathered together previously self-published work and the third a first installment of a long work called Testimony.

== Court poetry ==
In early drafts, Testimony was a prose retelling of stories that Reznikoff had discovered while working on court records. Reznikoff found these accounts to give him insight into the story of America between 1885 and 1915, both in its diversity and its violence. Tellingly, he chose to omit the judgements, focusing on the twists and turns of the stories.

Over the following forty years, Reznikoff worked on refashioning these stories into an extended found poem, which finally ran to some 500 pages over two volumes. He tried to express the stories in as near as possible the words of the participants. As a result, his poetry was almost entirely stripped of metaphor and of authorial personality and emotion. In this sense, Testimony can be read as the great monument of Objectivist poetry.

The poetic mode which Reznikof developed in writing this work was invaluable to his work on Holocaust. It was based on testimony in court cases related to the Nazi concentration camps and death camps. He also adopted this style for his poetry that reworked stories from the Torah or Old Testament.

== Late recognition ==
Reznikoff lived and wrote in relative obscurity for most of his life, with his work being either self-published or issued by small independent presses. In the 1960s, at the behest of friend and fellow poet George Oppen, and Oppen's sister June Oppen Degnan, New Directions published two books of his poetry: By the Waters of Manhattan (1962, New Directions/San Francisco Review NDP121), which had an Introduction by C. P. Snow; and Testimony: The United States 1885–1890 (1965, New Directions/San Francisco Review NDP200). But, despite acclaim from fellow poets such as Hayden Carruth, May Swenson, and Denise Levertov, critical reaction was generally negative. Reznikoff had to return to self-publishing to see his work in print.

In 1971, he was awarded the Morton Dauwen Zabel Prize of $2,500 by The National Institute of Arts and Letters. Around this time, he found a new publisher, Black Sparrow Press. They published By the Well of Living and Seeing: New and Selected Poems, 1918–1973 in 1974.

Reznikoff died in New York on January 22, 1976, aged 81. At the time of his death, he was correcting proofs of the first volume of the Black Sparrow Collected Poems. In the years immediately following his death, Black Sparrow reprinted all his major poetry and prose works. In addition, it published for the first time his completed novel The Manner "Music" (1977), found among his papers.

== Representation in other media ==
In 2013, the band Joan of Arc and performance group Every House Has a Door created Testimonium Songs, an album based on Reznikoff's Testimony.

The song "Texas Reznikoff" by the singer-songwriter Mitski, from her album Bury Me at Makeout Creek (2014), refers to Reznikoff's work. In a 2016 interview, Mitski cited Reznikoff as an influence on her music, and praised his poetic precision and ability to "create a striking image in people's brains".

Reznikoff is mentioned in Yannick Haenel's novel Tiens ferme ta couronne (2017), published in English as Hold Fast the Crown. One of the novel's chapters is named after him.

== Works ==
- Rhythms (De Vinne Press, 1918).
- Uriel Accosta: A Play & A Fourth Group of Verse (Cooper Press, 1921).
- Nine Plays (Charles Reznikoff, 1927).
- Five Groups of Verse (Charles Reznikoff, 1927) [incorporates four previous volumes of verse].
- By the Waters of Manhattan: An Annual [prose and verse] (Charles Reznikoff, 1929).
- By the Waters of Manhattan [novel] (Charles Boni, 1930; Rpt. Markus Wiener Publ., 1986; Black Sparrow Press, 2009).
- Testimony [prose] (The Objectivist Press, 1934).
- Jerusalem the Golden (The Objectivist Press, 1934).
- In Memoriam: 1933 (The Objectivist Press, 1934).
- Separate Way (The Objectivist Press, 1936).
- Going To and Fro and Walking Up and Down (Futuro Press, 1941).
- The Lionhearted: A Story about the Jews in Medieval England [novel] (Jewish Publication Society, 1944).
- Inscriptions: 1944–1956 (Charles Reznikoff, 1959).
- By the Waters of Manhattan: Selected Verse (New Directions/San Francisco Review, 1962).
- Family Chronicle: An Odyssey from Russia to America [novel, autobiography] (Charles Reznikoff, 1963; Rpt. Markus Wiener Publ., 1988).
- Testimony: The United States 1885–1890 (New Directions, 1965).
- Testimony: The United States 1891–1900 (Charles Reznikoff, 1968).
- By the Well of Living and Seeing and the Fifth Book of the Maccabees (Charles Reznikoff, 1969).
- By the Well of Living and Seeing: New & Selected Poems 1918–1973 (Black Sparrow Press, 1974).
- The Complete Poems of Charles Reznikoff, 1918–1975, 2 vols., ed. Seamus Cooney (Black Sparrow Press, 1976–77; Rpt. single volume 1989).
- The Manner "Music" [novel] (Black Sparrow Press, 1977).
- Holocaust (Black Sparrow Press, 1977; Rpt. with additional editorial materials, Five Leaves Publ., 2010).
- Testimony: The United States (1885–1915) Recitative, 2 vols. (Black Sparrow Press, 1978–79; Rpt. single volume with 1934 Testimony, Black Sparrow Press, 2015).
- Selected Letters 1917–1976, ed. Milton Hindus (Black Sparrow Press, 1997).
