= Kinneret Day School =

Jewish day school in Riverdale, NY

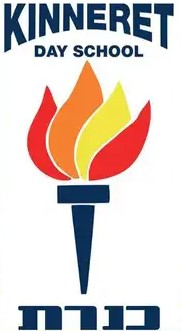

Location
- 2600 Netherland Avenue; Riverdale, NY 10463
- 40°52′46″N 73°54′52″W

Information
- Type: Private, Day
- Religious affiliation: Jewish
- Established: 1947
- Principal: Asher Abramovitz
- Assistant Principal: Allyson Israel
- Head of school: Ilana Mann
- Grades: Pre-K through 8th
- Enrollment: 200
- Campus type: Urban
- Team name: Lakers
- Annual tuition: $14,500 - $18,000
- Website: www.kinneretdayschool.org

Kinneret Day School is a coeducational, private Jewish day school located in the Riverdale section of the New York City borough of the Bronx. The school is non-denominational. Kinneret Day School is known for being affordable, inclusive, and academically rigorous.

== History ==
Kinneret Day School was founded in 1947 by Jewish leaders including Chaim Greenberg and future Israeli Prime Minister Golda Meir. Kinneret was founded as a secular, inclusive community day school. The school derives its name from the Sea of Galilee (Hebrew: יָם כִּנֶּרֶת), also called the Kinneret.

The school was originally established in Brooklyn, NY, and later moved to the Grand Concourse area of the Bronx, and eventually to Riverdale in the Bronx. Today, Kinneret is situated in the lower levels of the Century Tower, a large apartment complex in Riverdale. The school's principal, Asher Abramovitz, has worked there for over 50 years.

The school's enrollment is approximately 200 students from pre-K through eighth grade.

== Curriculum ==
Kinneret's educational curriculum includes secular and Judaic studies with an emphasis on the Hebrew language.

The school sponsors boys and girls soccer teams which compete in the Yeshiva Middle School Sports Association (YMSSA) league. Home games are played at the House of Sports in Ardsley, NY. Additional school programs include a school choir and Shakespeare Society.

Kinneret Day School consistently achieves high student acceptance rates to NYC specialized high schools including Bronx Science and Stuyvesant High School.
