= Southern Jewish History =

- Discipline: history
- Language: English
- Edited by: Mark K. Bauman

Publication details
- History: 1998–present
- Publisher: Southern Jewish Historical Society (United States)
- Frequency: annually

Standard abbreviations
- ISO 4: South. Jew. Hist.

Indexing
- ISSN: 1521-4206
- OCLC no.: 39752401

Links
- Journal homepage

Southern Jewish History is an annual peer-reviewed academic journal of Jewish and Southern history. It is published by the Southern Jewish Historical Society and was established in 1998. Its editor in chief is Mark K. Bauman. Its managing editor is Bryan Edward Stone.
