= Riverdale, Bronx =

Neighborhood in New York City

Riverdale
- Neighborhood of the Bronx
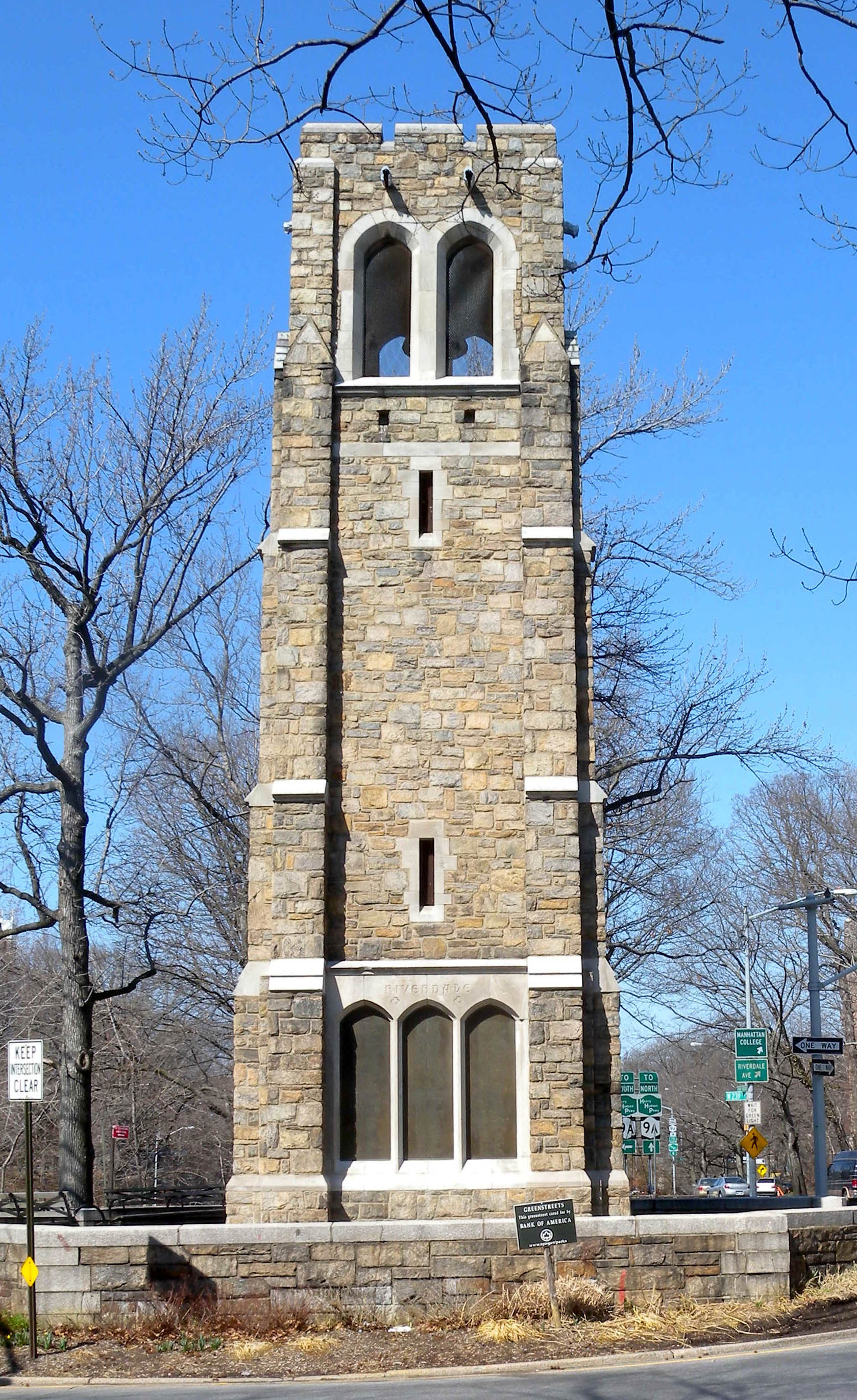
- Bell Tower Park in Riverdale
- Location in New York City. The indicated area on the map includes the Spuyten Duyvil Neighborhood.
- Coordinates: 40.894°N 73.913°W
- Country: United States
- State: New York
- City: New York City
- Borough: The Bronx
- Community District: Bronx 8
- Founded: 1852
- Named for: The numerous brooks, streams and meadows in the hilly region.

Area
  - Total: 2.714 sq mi (7.03 km^{2})

Population (2010)
  - Total: 47,850
  - Density: 17,630/sq mi (6,807/km^{2})
- Demonym: Riverdalian

Economics Includes Fieldston
  - Median income (2019): $64,360
- ZIP Codes: 10463, 10471
- Area code: 718, 347, 929, and 917

Riverdale is a residential neighborhood in the northwestern portion of the New York City borough of the Bronx. Riverdale, which had a population of 47,850 as of the 2000 United States census, contains the city's northernmost point at the University of Mount Saint Vincent. Riverdale's boundaries are disputed, but it is commonly agreed to be bordered by Yonkers to the north, Van Cortlandt Park and Broadway to the east, the Kingsbridge neighborhood to the southeast, either the Harlem River or the Spuyten Duyvil neighborhood to the south (Although Spuyten Duyvil is sometimes considered to be the southernmost section of Riverdale), and the Hudson River to the west. Riverdale Avenue is the primary north–south thoroughfare through Riverdale.

The neighborhood is part of Bronx Community District 8, and its ZIP Codes include 10463 and 10471. The area is patrolled by the 50th Precinct of the New York City Police Department.

== History ==
Legend states that in 1664, Anthony Van Corlaer (later determined to be a fictional character) died while attempting to swim across the Harlem River from nearby Spuyten Duyvil. In the legend, a witness to Van Corlaer's death stated that "the devil" in the shape of a giant fish swam up and proceeded to "seize the sturdy Anthony by the leg and drag him beneath the waves." This fictional account may be a reference to the earliest recorded shark attack in the New World. In the late 17th century, Frederick Philipse, the lord of Philipse Manor in Westchester County, received permission to construct a bridge across Spuyten Duyvil Creek and charge tolls. "King's Bridge", located roughly south of and parallel to where West 230th Street lies today, opened in 1693.

Early in its residential development, Riverdale was a 19th-century estate district where many of Manhattan's moguls built their country estates; for example, in northern Riverdale, what is now Fieldston was part of the estate of Major Joseph Delafield, who purchased 250 acres (100 ha) in 1829, and named it after his family's estate in England. At the turn of the century, the new popularity of railroad commutes enabled wealthy businessmen to make Riverdale their year-round residence. Fieldston, owned by a private association, is a particularly intact example of a turn-of-the-century upper-class suburb. The Hudson Hill neighborhood retains many historic mansions. Riverdale's elite private schools and historic churches also reflect this past. Development of the neighborhood began in the latter half of the 19th century once the New York Central and Hudson River Railroad came through. The tracks originally crossed Spuyten Duyvil Creek and into Manhattan on the west side, but Cornelius Vanderbilt wanted to consolidate his railroad operations into one terminal. He had tracks laid along the north side of the Harlem River so that trains coming south from Albany could join with the Harlem and New Haven lines and come into Manhattan down the Park Avenue main line, along modern-day Park Avenue, into his new Grand Central Depot. This is the route still used by the Metro-North Railroad's Hudson Line.

The Delafield family laid out lots in Fieldston in 1909 – the year after the IRT Broadway–Seventh Avenue Line (present-day 1 train) was extended to Van Cortlandt Park–242nd Street, intending to develop the land, which at first was called "Delafield Woods". Rather than use a grid plan, civil engineer Albert E. Wheeler, following the suggestions made by Frederick Law Olmsted and James R. Croes in 1876, designed a street plan which followed the contours of the land and preserved as much of the wooded areas as possible. The first house was begun in 1910 and finished in 1911; by the beginning of the 21st century, Fieldston, a privately owned community, was one of the wealthiest neighborhoods in New York City. Leland Weintraub, the commissioner who moved for the district's creation, noted that "most of the features commonly associated with the American romantic suburb of the mid-19th century", including "a picturesque site, landscaping and architecture; connection to the city by accessible transportation and a layout adapted to the topography" are present in the area.

In 1928, Genevieve Ludlow Griscom, who was a member of a small religious group called the Outer Court of the Order of the Living Christ, built a 15,000-square-foot (1,400 m^{2}) mansion at 360 West 253rd Street – also addressed as 5200 Longview Place – for the express purpose of housing Jesus Christ when the Second Coming occurred. After being derelict for a number of years under successive owners, the mansion was bought in 1987 by entrepreneur Jerry Galuten, who renovated it into an even more opulent 17 room home. After being on- and off-the market for eight years, with an asking price as high as $15 million, the house sold in January 2017 for $6.25 million.

As the 20th century progressed, upscale apartment buildings and smaller houses were added to the neighborhood. To this day, Riverdale continues to maintain its character as an affluent enclave in the city of New York. The rich history of Riverdale has led to the creation of the Riverdale Historic District.

In May 2009, the FBI ran a sting operation to prevent a bombing plot in which two Riverdale synagogues were the suggested targets. This followed a Molotov cocktail attack in 2000 on a different Riverdale synagogue and the 1989 firebombing of the Riverdale Press.

On July 26, 2010, the National Weather Service confirmed that an EF1 tornado had hit Riverdale the day before. There were no fatalities, but seven people were injured.

On December 1, 2013, a train derailment near Spuyten Duyvil station resulted in four deaths and over 70 injuries, of which 11 were critical.

== Geography ==
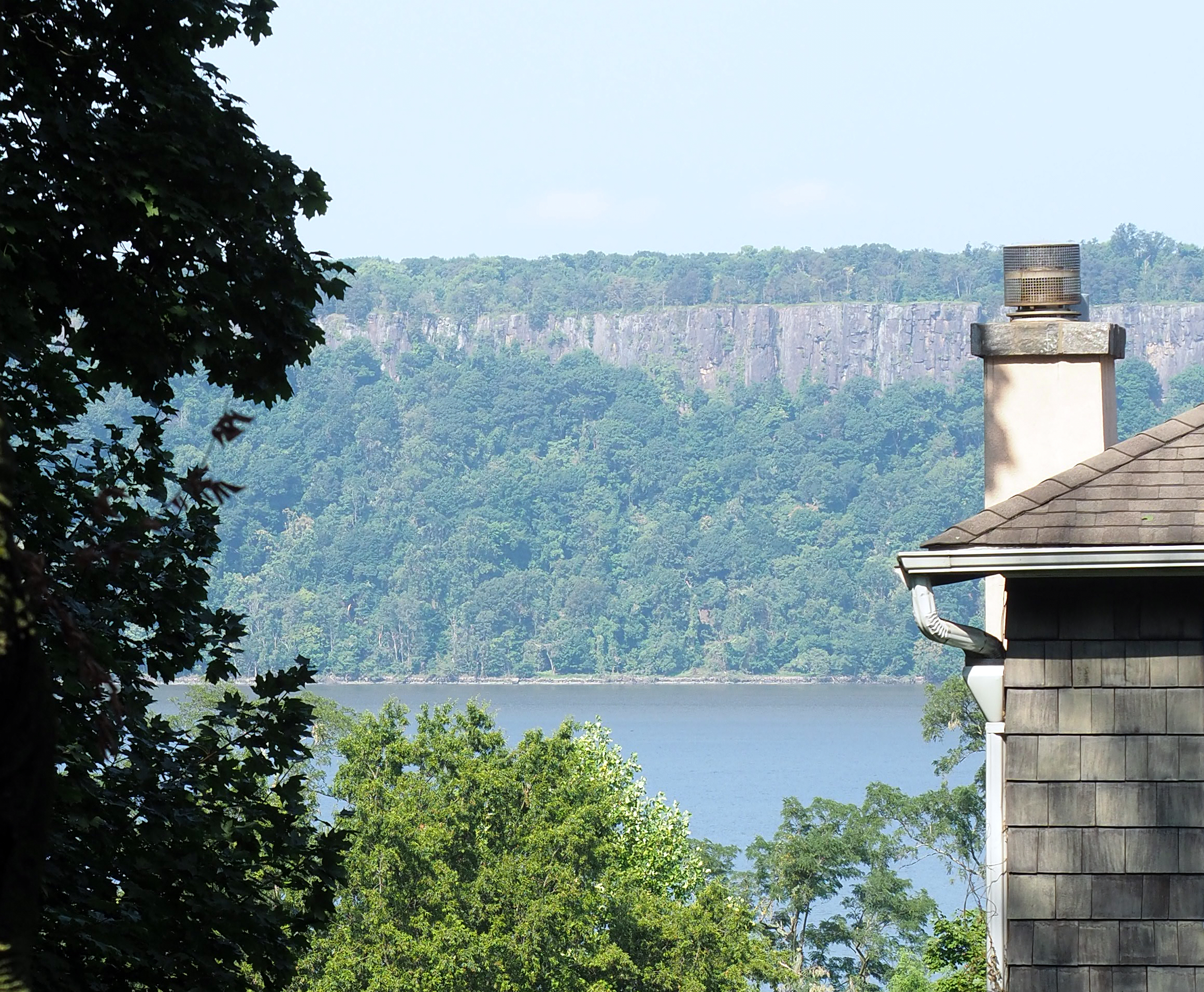
Palisades (New Jersey), looking west across the Hudson River from Sigma Place, Riverdale

Riverdale covers about 3 square miles (7.8 km^{2}) in area. It has one of the highest elevations in New York City, affording it views of the Empire State Building, George Washington Bridge, Hudson River and New Jersey Palisades. It is also noted for the numerous parks and expanses of greenery and original forest that complement its hilly landscape. The neighborhood is bordered on the north by the city of Yonkers in Westchester County, and on the west by the Hudson River, but its eastern and southern boundaries are frequently disputed. The AIA Guide to New York City gives Broadway as the eastern boundary, and the Harlem River as the southern. There are several long-debated subsections of Riverdale:

- Central Riverdale (the "downtown" area of Riverdale – from Manhattan College Parkway to West 232nd Street and from the Henry Hudson Parkway to Riverdale Avenue and Waldo Avenue)
- Fieldston (Riverdale south of West 250th Street, east of the Henry Hudson Parkway, north of Manhattan College Parkway, and west of Tibbett Avenue)
- Hudson Hill (Riverdale above West 246th Street and west of Henry Hudson Parkway)
- North Riverdale (Riverdale above West 254th Street and west of Fieldston Road)
- Mosholu (Riverdale East of Fieldston Road and above West 254th Street, includes Spencer Ave, Huxley Rd, Post Rd, and Broadway)
- Spuyten Duyvil / South Riverdale (the southernmost section of Riverdale, below West 232nd Street or West 239th Street by some definitions. Also included is the business, commercial and shopping district located at West 231st Street and Broadway)
- Villanova Heights (a sub-division bounded by Fieldston Road on the east, 250th Street on the south, and the Henry Hudson Parkway on the west and north)

The leafy, scenic enclave of Fieldston was designated a historic district by the New York City Landmarks Preservation Commission in 2006. There is also a 15-acre Riverdale Historic District (6.1 ha) in the northwest of the neighborhood, designated in 1990.

== Demographics ==
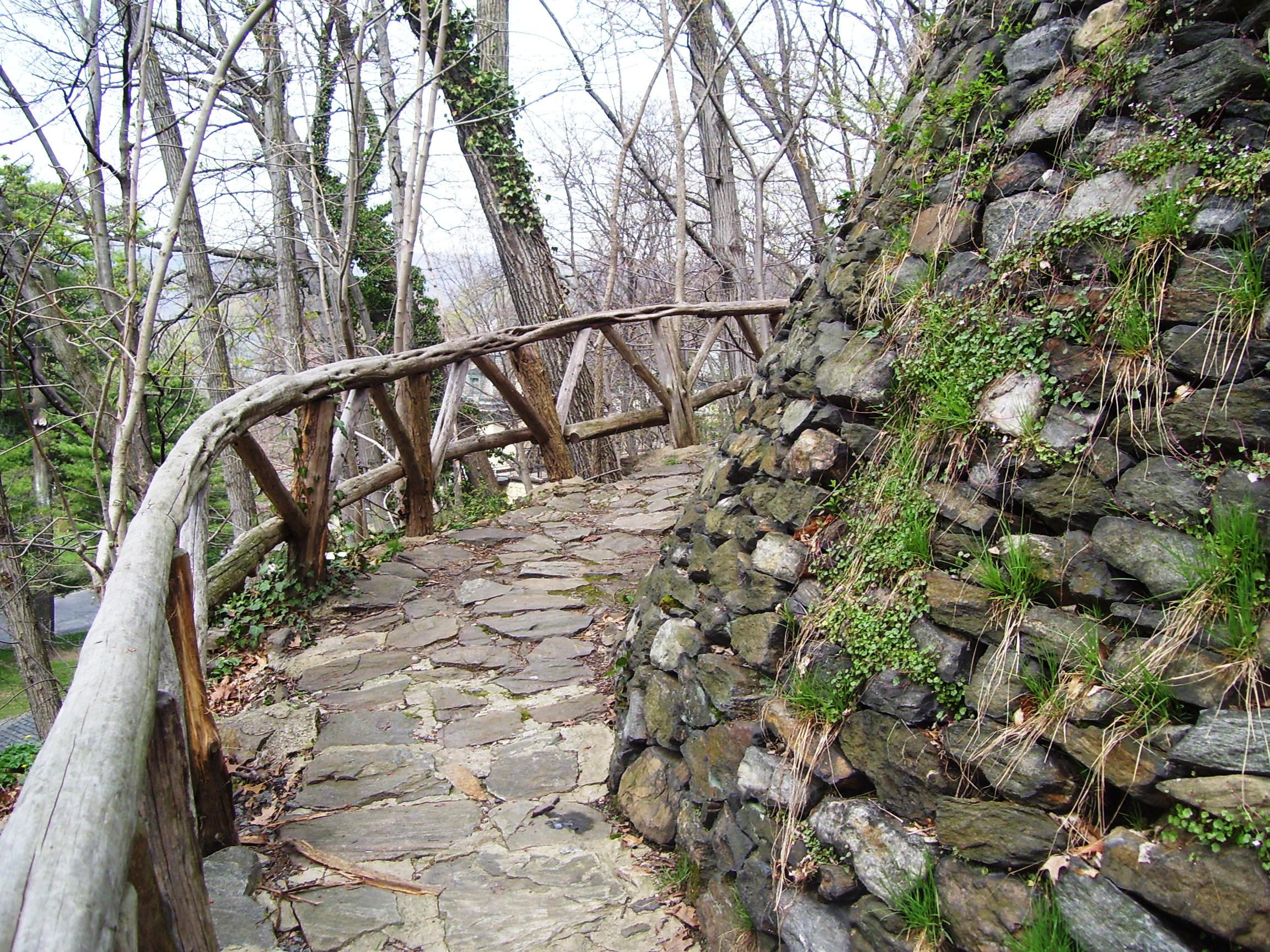
A pathway in Wave Hill

Based on data from the 2010 United States census, the population of Riverdale was 27,860, a change of −153 (−0.5%) from the 28,013 counted in 2000. Covering an area of 1,139.68 acres (461.21 ha), the neighborhood had a population density of 24.4 inhabitants per acre (15,600/sq mi; 6,000/km^{2}).

The racial makeup of the neighborhood was 67.5% (18,794) White, 7.7% (2,136) African American, 0.1% (26) Native American, 5.3% (1,468) Asian, 0% (4) Pacific Islander, 0.3% (91) from other races, and 1.6% (446) from two or more races. Hispanic or Latino of any race were 17.6% (4,895) of the population. The neighborhood has a substantial Jewish presence. In 2003, a majority of the Jewish population in the Bronx lived in Riverdale.

The entirety of Community District 8, which comprises Riverdale, Fieldston, and Kingsbridge, had 102,927 inhabitants as of NYC Health's 2018 Community Health Profile, with an average life expectancy of 80.9 years. This is about the same as the median life expectancy of 81.2 for all New York City neighborhoods. Most inhabitants are youth and middle-aged adults: 20% are between the ages of between 0–17, 28% between 25 and 44, and 25% between 45 and 64. The ratio of college-aged and elderly residents was lower, at 9% and 18% respectively.

As of 2017, the median household income in Community District 8 was $53,986. In 2018, an estimated 15% of Riverdale residents lived in poverty, compared to 25% in all of the Bronx and 20% in all of New York City. One in eleven residents (9%) were unemployed, compared to 13% in the Bronx and 9% in New York City. Rent burden, or the percentage of residents who have difficulty paying their rent, is 52% in Riverdale, compared to the boroughwide and citywide rates of 58% and 51% respectively. Based on this calculation, as of 2018, Riverdale is considered high-income relative to the rest of the city and not gentrifying.

== Housing ==
Riverdale is home to the modernist landmark Saul Victor house, designed by Ferdinand Gottlieb in 1967. Other famous mansions in the Hudson Hill neighborhood include: Greyston (1864), Alderbrook (1880), Stonehurst (1861) and Oaklawn (1863). Since 2005, Central Riverdale has experienced a building boom with the addition of many mid- and high-rise condominium buildings. With a median residence value of $579,196 as of 2013, Riverdale is one of the most expensive neighborhoods in New York City and is considered one of the most sought-after residential neighborhoods.

Before the wider development of Riverdale, housing consisted of large, architecturally distinguished mansions built in the early 20th century, mostly in Georgian- and Tudor-revival styles, which recall scenes of "rural Connecticut" rather than the city. These are mostly concentrated in the Fieldston section of Riverdale, known as the estate area. In addition, more affordable pre-war buildings and smaller houses are scattered throughout Riverdale. The 1950s saw the construction of many low-rise (six-story) brick buildings. By the early to mid-1960s, a number of larger brick towers (10–20 stories) started popping up. Many of these full-service buildings featuring doormen were designed by architect Philip Birnbaum, who designed more than 300 buildings in the city, including Skyview, the Windsors and the Whitehall in Riverdale.

In 1974, a large, fortress-like residential compound and school was established in North Riverdale by the Permanent Mission of the USSR to the United Nations (now the Permanent Mission of the Russian Federation to the UN) to house diplomats and their families. The 20-story building was constructed from the top down, with the upper floors built first.

By the 1980s, most of the apartment buildings that were owned by single landlords and rented, were converted into cooperatives. Unlike most of the Bronx, Riverdale is mostly owner-occupied housing. Spuyten Duyvil has the greatest concentration of high rises in Riverdale with the Century, 555 Kappock, and Winston Churchill next to one another. Since 2005, Central Riverdale has experienced a building boom with the addition of many mid- and high-rise condominium buildings that contrast with the older brick style.

=== Arbor ===
In August 2008, Columbia University purchased an almost-completed apartment building near Henry Hudson Parkway for use as faculty housing. This building would go on to be named the Arbor. The Arbor is located at 3260 Henry Hudson Parkway, at the corner of West 235th Street. It houses Columbia students who take classes at the CUIMC, Morningside, or Manhattanville campuses. Students sign one-year leases for apartments that have between one and three bedrooms.

The Arbor Shuttle operates between Morningside, CUIMC, and the Arbor, using cutaway vans. It is billed as the main means of transport between the Arbor and Morningside, but it only operates on weekdays on an hourly schedule. The shuttle formerly also served the 231st Street station, but has since been cut back to only serve the Arbor.

=== Gallery ===
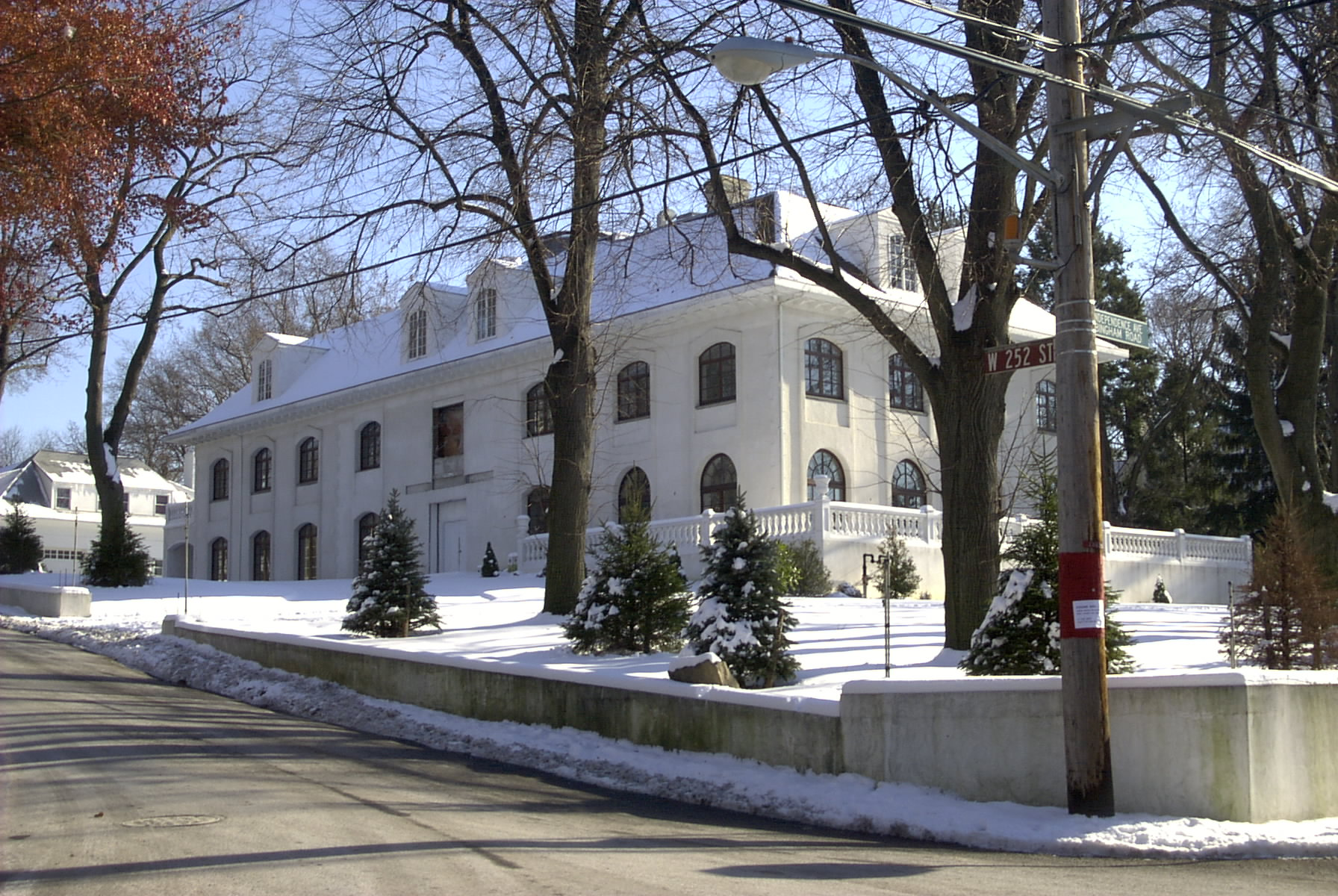
JFK house at 5040 Independence Avenue

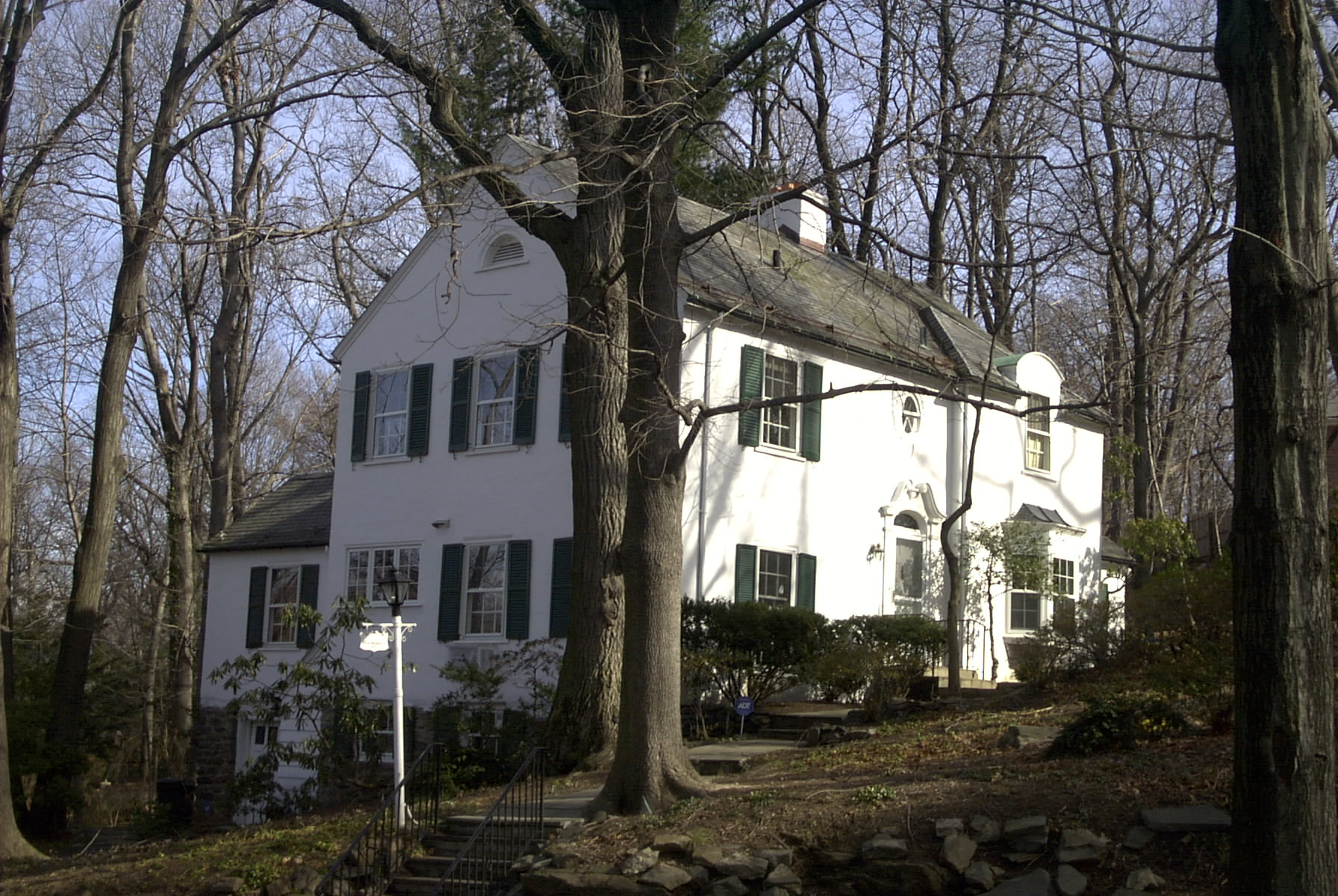
Lou Gehrig's house

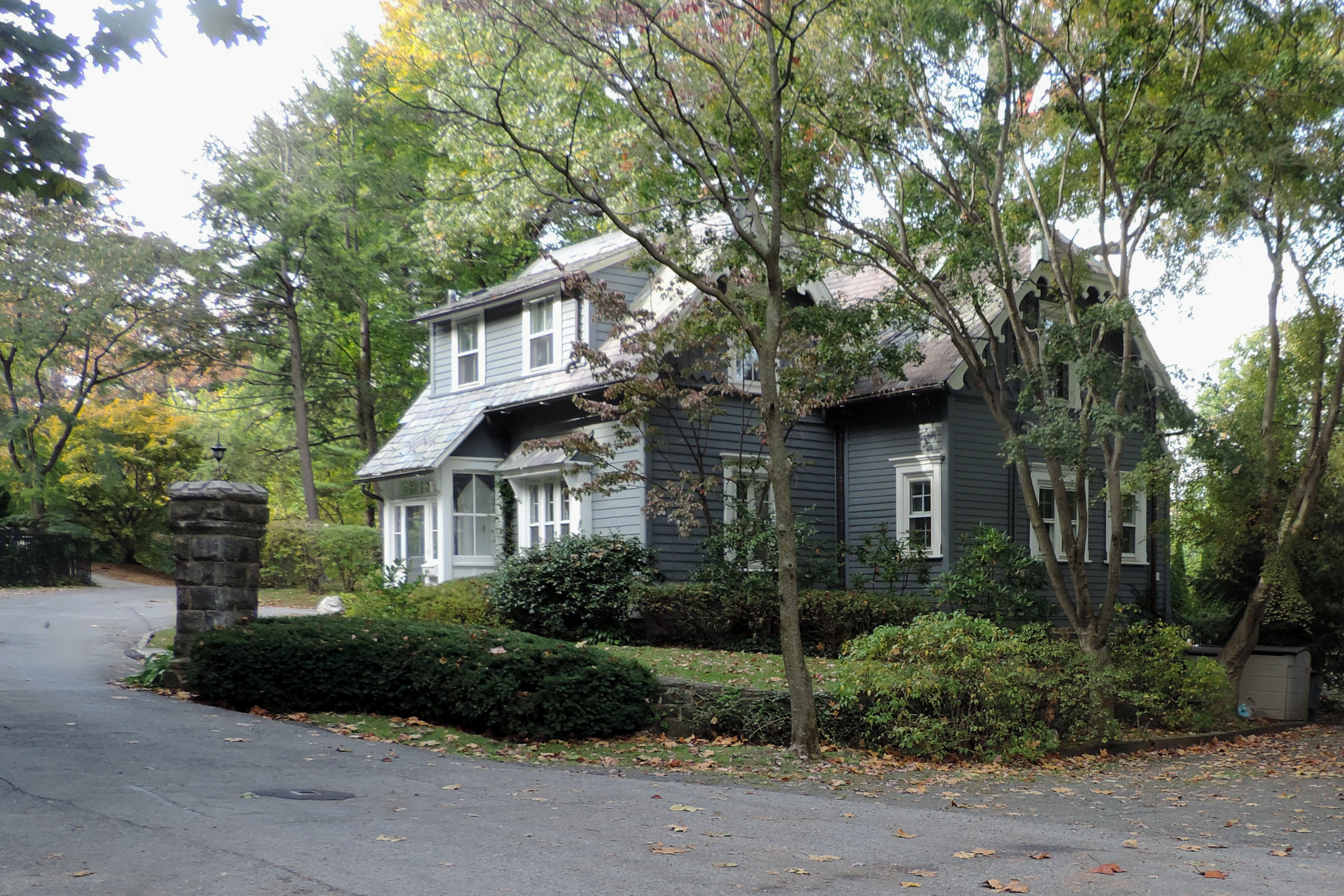
A house on Independence Avenue

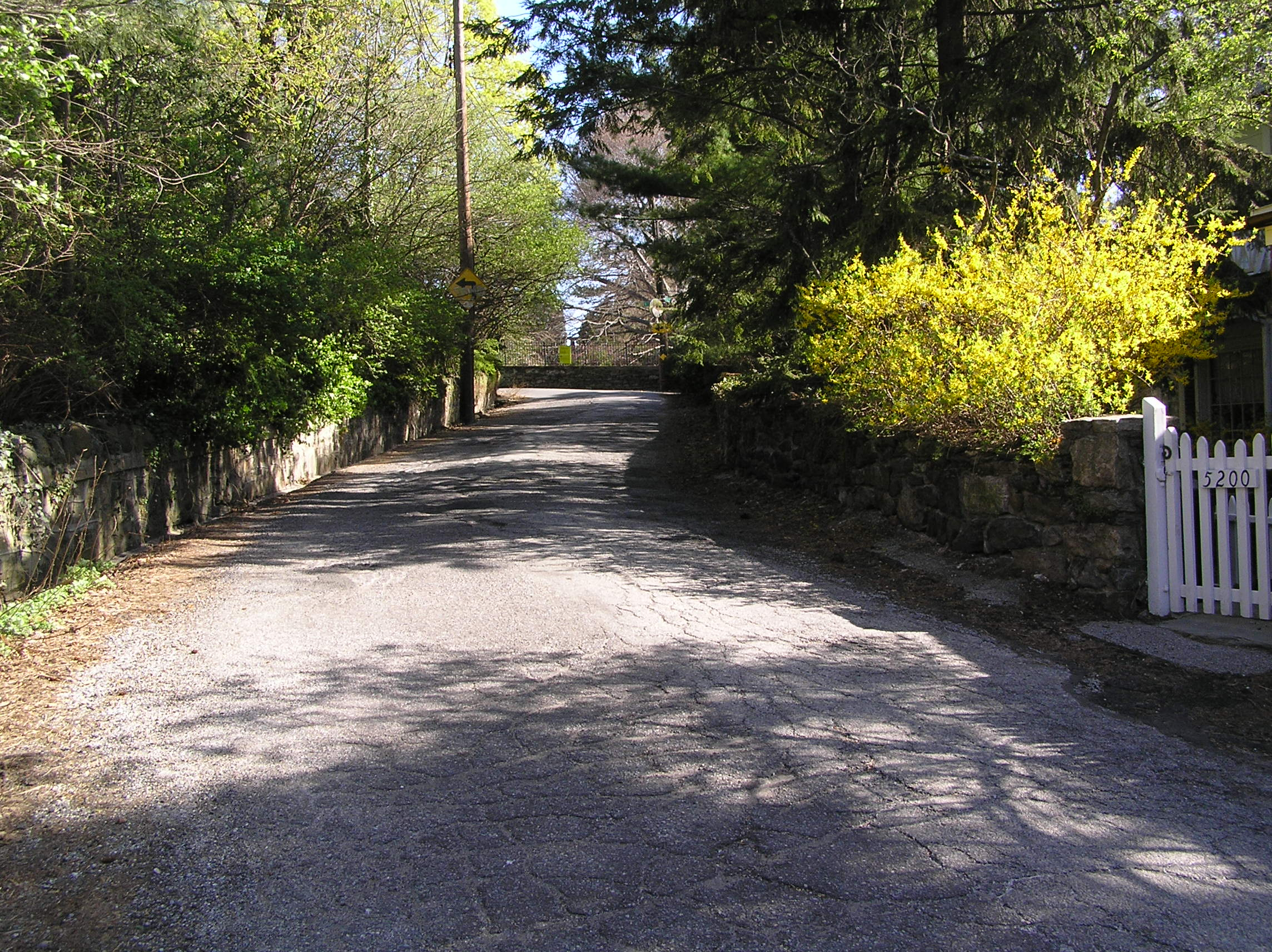
Palisade Avenue

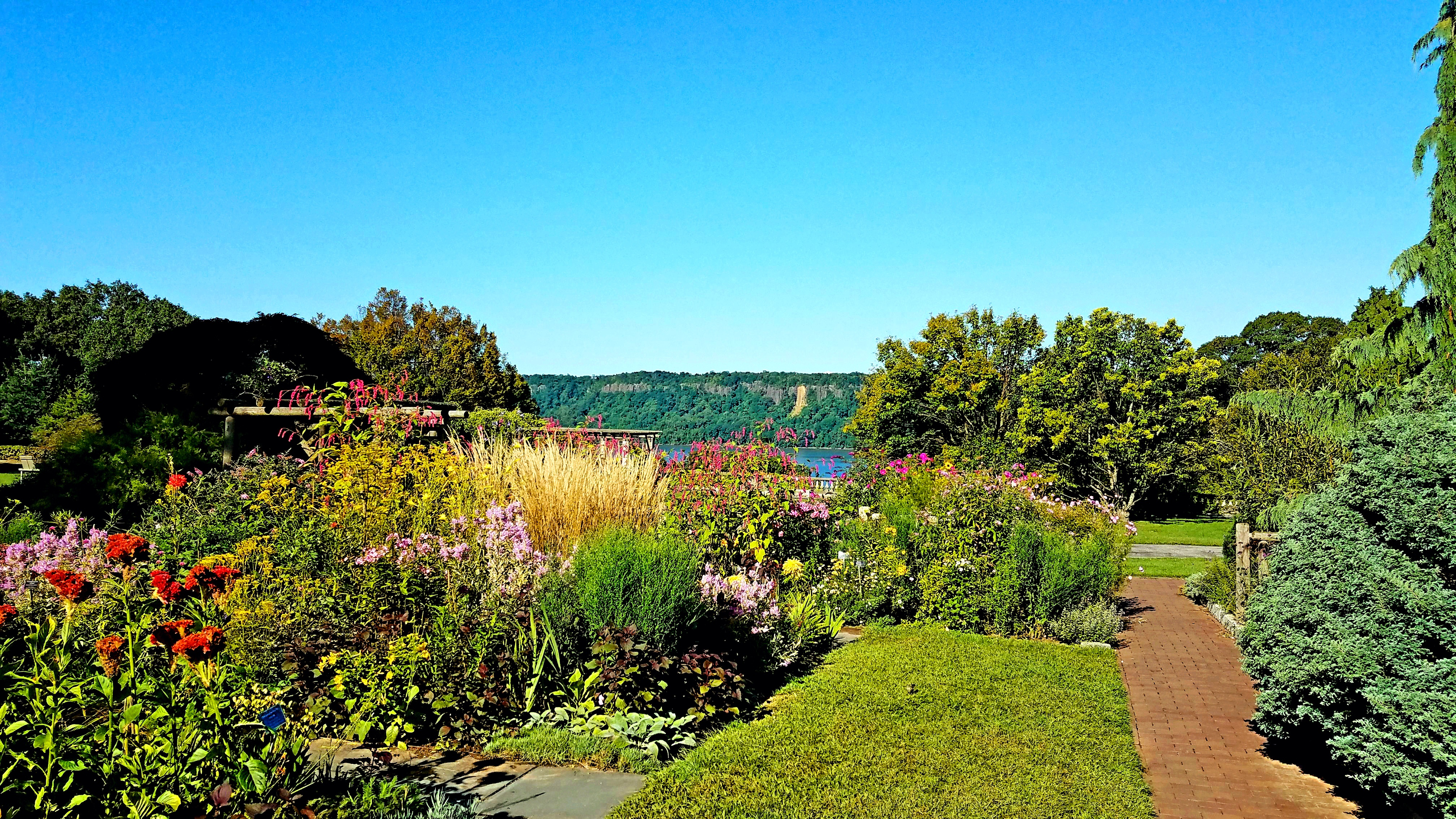
Flower Garden at Wave Hill

== Media ==
A Pulitzer-Prize-winning weekly newspaper, the Riverdale Press brings news of interest to residents of the neighborhood.

== Political representation ==
Riverdale is located within New York's 15th congressional district, which is represented by Democrat Ritchie Torres. Riverdale is part of 34th district of the New York State Senate, represented by a Democrat, and the 81st Assembly district, represented by Democrat Jeffrey Dinowitz. In the New York City Council, Riverdale is part of District 11, represented by Democrat Eric Dinowitz.

== Police and crime ==
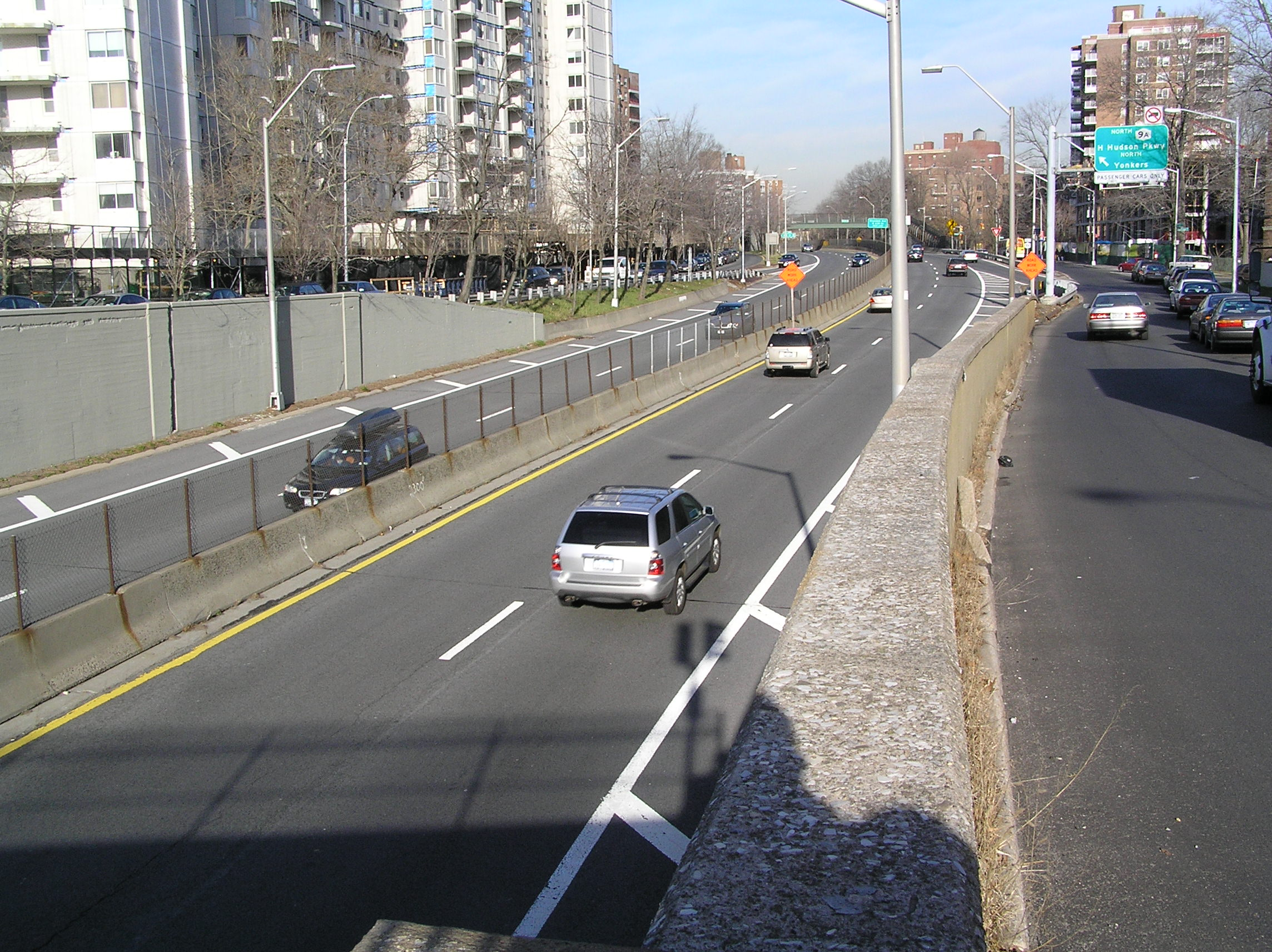
Northbound Henry Hudson Parkway

Riverdale is patrolled by the 50th Precinct of the NYPD, located at 3450 Kingsbridge Avenue. The 50th Precinct ranked 13th safest out of 69 patrol areas for per-capita crime in 2010. As of 2018, with a non-fatal assault rate of 40 per 100,000 people, Riverdale's rate of violent crimes per capita is less than that of the city as a whole. The incarceration rate of 225 per 100,000 people is lower than that of the city as a whole. Riverdale is known for having some of the lowest crime rates in New York City.

The 50th Precinct has a lower crime rate than in the 1990s, with crimes across all categories having decreased by 69.9% between 1990 and 2022. The precinct reported three murders, 22 rapes, 185 robberies, 213 felony assaults, 126 burglaries, 695 grand larcenies, and 288 grand larcenies auto in 2022.

== Fire safety ==
Riverdale contains a New York City Fire Department (FDNY) fire station, Engine Co. 52/Ladder Co. 52, at 4550 Henry Hudson Parkway East. Engine Co. 52/Ladder Co. 52 is the only firehouse in Riverdale and the northernmost fire station operated by the FDNY.

== Health ==
As of 2018, preterm births are slightly more common in Riverdale than in other places citywide, though births to teenage mothers are less common. In Riverdale, there were 89 preterm births per 1,000 live births (compared to 87 per 1,000 citywide), and 13.1 births to teenage mothers per 1,000 live births (compared to 19.3 per 1,000 citywide). Riverdale has a relatively average population of residents who are uninsured. In 2018, this population of uninsured residents was estimated to be 16%, higher than the citywide rate of 12%.

The concentration of fine particulate matter, the deadliest type of air pollutant, in Riverdale is 0.0075 milligrams per cubic metre (7.5×10^{−9} oz/ft^{3}), more than the city average. Ten percent of Riverdale residents are smokers, which is lower than the city average of 14% of residents being smokers. In Riverdale, 24% of residents are obese, 12% are diabetic, and 28% have high blood pressure—compared to the citywide averages of 24%, 11%, and 28% respectively. In addition, 21% of children are obese, compared to the citywide average of 20%.

Eighty-six percent of residents eat some fruits and vegetables every day, which is less than the city's average of 87%. In 2018, 83% of residents described their health as "good", "very good", or "excellent", higher than the city's average of 78%. For every supermarket in Riverdale, there are 10 bodegas.

The nearest hospitals are James J. Peters VA Medical Center in Kingsbridge Heights, North Central Bronx Hospital and Montefiore Medical Center in Norwood.

== Post offices and ZIP Codes ==
Riverdale is located within two ZIP Codes. The area north of Manhattan College Parkway and 239th Street is in 10471, while the area south of these two streets is in 10463. While 10471 is entirely in Riverdale, 10463 also covers the adjacent neighborhoods of Kingsbridge, Bronx, and Marble Hill, Manhattan. The United States Postal Service operates three post offices nearby:

- Riverdale Station – 5951 Riverdale Avenue
- Fieldston Station – 444 West 238th Street
- Spuyten Duyvil Station – 562 Kappock Street

== Education ==
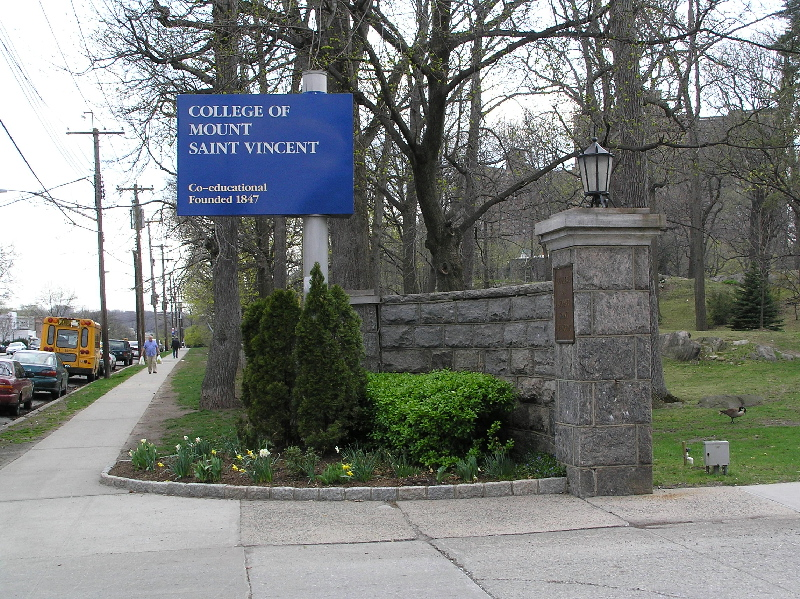
University of Mount Saint Vincent

Riverdale generally has a similar rate of college-educated residents to the rest of the city as of 2018. While 45% of residents age 25 and older have a college education or higher, 18% have less than a high school education and 37% are high school graduates or have some college education. By contrast, 26% of Bronx residents and 43% of city residents have a college education or higher. The percentage of Riverdale students excelling in math rose from 21% in 2000 to 48% in 2011, and reading achievement increased from 28% to 33% during the same time period.

Riverdale's rate of elementary school student absenteeism is about the same as the rest of New York City. In Riverdale, 20% of elementary school students missed twenty or more days per school year, higher than the citywide average of 20%. Additionally, 78% of high school students in Riverdale graduate on time, higher than the citywide average of 75%.

=== Schools ===
==== Public schools ====
The public schools are a part of the New York City Department of Education. The public elementary schools are the Spuyten Duyvil School (P.S. 24) and the Robert J. Christen School (P.S. 81). There is one zoned public middle and high school in Riverdale: M.S./H.S 141, the Riverdale Kingsbridge Academy. Nearby public high schools that serve the community include the Bronx High School of Science, a specialized high school; John F. Kennedy High School Campus, consisting of four separate high schools; and the IN-Tech Academy MS/HS 368, which also contains a middle school.

==== Private schools ====
Riverdale is home to three top-tier private schools: Horace Mann, Riverdale Country, and Fieldston, all members of the Ivy Preparatory School League; and two Roman Catholic colleges: The University of Mount Saint Vincent and Manhattan University.

An increase in the Jewish population of the neighborhood in the late twentieth century led to Riverdale now being home to top-ranked Jewish day schools including the SAR Academy (an elementary school), the SAR High School, and Kinneret Day School (pre-K through 8th). Yeshivas include the Yeshiva of Telshe Alumni, Yeshiva Ohavei Torah, Yeshivat Chovevei Torah and Yeshivat Maharat. Catholic elementary schools in the area are Visitation School, and St. Margaret of Cortona School, where President John F. Kennedy received his Confirmation.

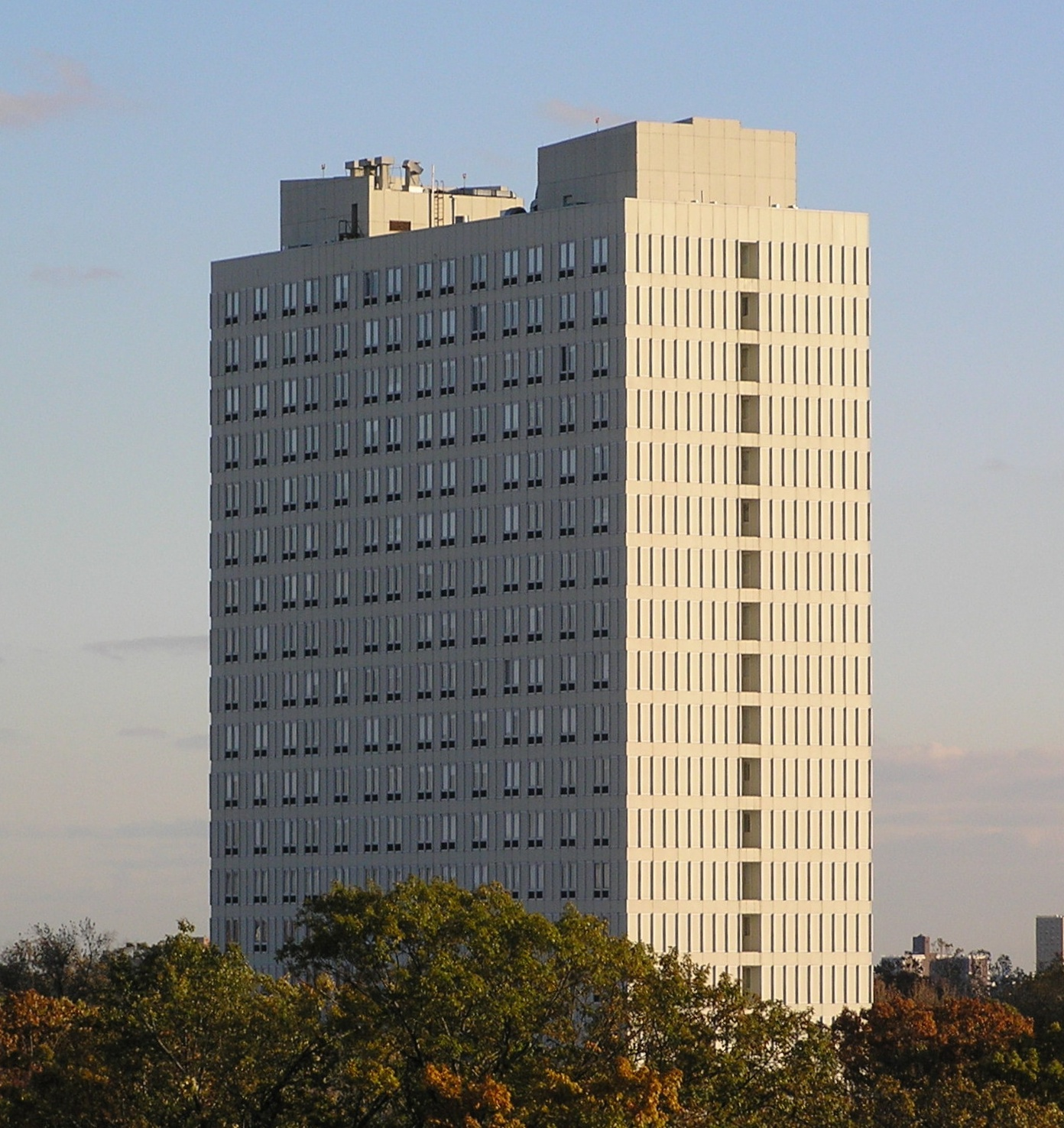
Russian Mission Residency

The area also has several preschools including BedRock Preschool, Kinneret Day School's Nursery and Pre-K programs, the Riverdale Temple Nursery School, Spuyten Duyvil Preschool, SAR Academy (Early Learning Center), Riverdale Nursery School and Family Center, the Riverdale Presbyterian Church Nursery School, and Riverdale Montessori School.

The Russian Mission School in New York is located in Riverdale, on the grounds of the Russian Mission Residency.

=== Libraries ===
The New York Public Library (NYPL) operates three branches near Riverdale.

- The Van Cortlandt branch is located at 3882 Cannon Place. The two-story, 5,800-square-foot (540 m^{2}) branch opened in 2019, replacing a smaller one-story branch a few blocks away, which opened in 1969 and consisted of a single room.
- The Riverdale branch is located at 5540 Mosholu Avenue. The branch opened in 1967, replacing a smaller library, and is located in a one-story L-shaped brick building surrounded by a garden.
- The Spuyten Duyvil branch is located at 650 West 235th Street. The one-story branch opened in 1971 and was designed by Giorgio Cavaglieri.

== Transportation ==
=== Public transportation ===
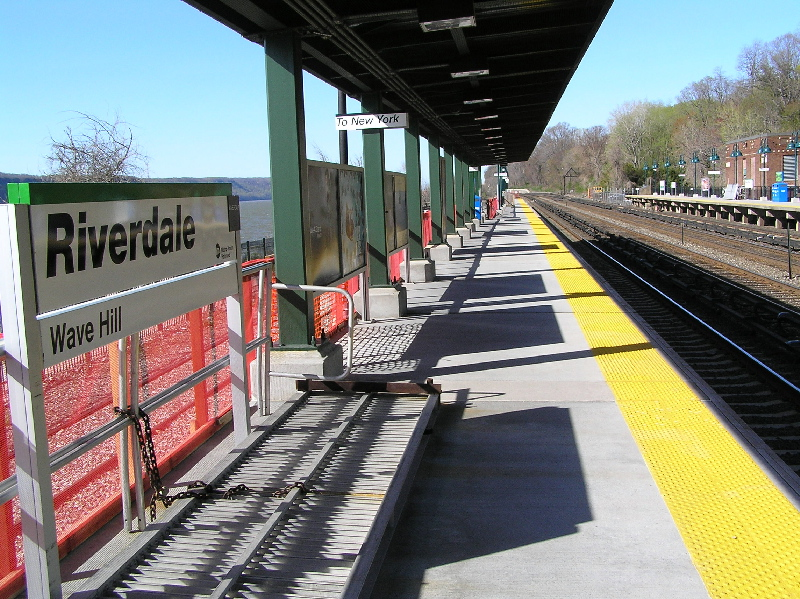
The Riverdale station of the Metro-North Railroad

The following MTA Regional Bus Operations bus routes serve Riverdale:

- Bx1: to Third Avenue–138th Street station (via Grand Concourse)
- Bx7: to 168th Street station, Manhattan (via Riverdale Avenue, and Broadway)
- Bx9: to West Farms Square–East Tremont Avenue station (via Broadway)
- Bx10: to Norwood–205th Street station (via Riverdale Avenue, Henry Hudson Parkway, and Johnson Avenue)
- Bx20: to Inwood–207th Street station, Manhattan (via Henry Hudson Parkway, and Johnson Avenue)
- BxM1: express to Midtown Manhattan (via East Side)
- BxM2: express to Penn Station (via West Side)
- BxM3: express to Midtown Manhattan (via Major Deegan Expressway/East Side)
- BxM18: express to Lower Manhattan

Columbia Transportation's Arbor Shuttle terminates at West 235th Street and Henry Hudson Pkwy. The Queens Riverdale Commuter Route terminates at West 238th Street and Riverdale Avenue.

Riverdale is served by the 1 train of the New York City Subway, at Van Cortlandt Park–242nd Street Station.

Riverdale is also served by the following Bee-Line Bus System routes, which run to Westchester County:

- Bee-Line 1: to Tarrytown, Valhalla, White Plains, or Yonkers
- Bee-Line 1X: express to Westchester Community College and Westchester Medical Center
- Bee-Line 2: to South Westchester Executive Park or Yonkers
- Bee-Line 3 Limited: to Purchase
- Bee-Line 8: to Tuckahoe station

Metro-North commuter railroad service is available at two stations, both on the Hudson Line: the Spuyten Duyvil station at Edsall Avenue and the Riverdale station between West 254th and 255th Streets. Hudson Rail Link connects the Metro-North stations to the surrounding area, with Routes A, B, C, and D serving Riverdale station, and Routes J, K, L, and M serving Spuyten Duyvil station.

=== Road ===
By car, Riverdale is commonly reached by the Henry Hudson Parkway (NY 9A) via the Henry Hudson Bridge, and by Broadway (US 9) via the Broadway Bridge.

== Religious communities ==
The neighborhood contains 16,000 Jewish adults and 4,000 Jewish children in 10,000 households. Notable synagogues include:

- Hebrew Institute of Riverdale
- Riverdale Jewish Center
- Riverdale Temple

== Points of interest ==
=== Parks ===
- Bell Tower Park next to the Henry Hudson Parkway has the Riverdale Monument, a stone war memorial built in 1930. The Bell Tower was designed by architect Dwight James Baum. The plaque that sits on the Bell Tower lists the names of individuals from Riverdale and neighboring areas who served in World War I.
- Brust Park, on 1.8 acres (0.73 ha) fronting Manhattan College Parkway and Greystone Avenue, is maintained by Stewards of Brust Park and its volunteers from the community and Manhattan University's Green Club.
- Gaelic Park, located at West 240th Street, has been owned by Manhattan University since 1991, and is the home field of many of its sports teams, including lacrosse, soccer and softball, as well as the school's intramural sports. Gaelic Park also is headquarters of the New York GAA, where Gaelic football and hurling are played in the New York metropolitan area. Gaelic Park is the home field for Rugby New York in Major League Rugby.
- Riverdale Waterfront Promenade is a tiny sliver of land along the Hudson River immediately adjacent to the Riverdale Metro-North train station. Inaugurated in 2005 by mayor Michael Bloomberg, the park was created to improve riverside access to local residents. Access to the park is only through the station, crossing the railroad tracks on an elevated walkway. It provides the only local public access to unobstructed views of the Hudson River. Access to the river has been blocked for over 150 years, first by railroads, later by the Major Deegan Expressway. In 2023, plans were announced to expand the Harlem River Greenway north from Manhattan into the Bronx.
- Seton Park, between 232nd and 235th Street on the west side of Henry Hudson Parkway, formerly the site of Seton Hospital, which was demolished in 1955. The park includes a large green space, tennis courts, two baseball fields, a skate park, and playgrounds.
- Wave Hill, a combination botanical garden and outdoor art gallery, is located in the so-called Hudson Hill. Covering 20 acres (8.1 ha) overlooking the Hudson River, the property was developed in the 1840s by William Lewis Morris. The property was used by Theodore Roosevelt and Mark Twain, and later owned by George Walbridge Perkins. The city parks department describes it as "one of New York City's most beautiful parks".

=== Houses of worship ===
- Chabad of Riverdale
- Christ Church Riverdale
- Church of the Visitation
- Congregation Tehillah
- Adath Israel of Riverdale
- Edgehill Church at Spuyten Duyvil
- Hebrew Institute of Riverdale
- Riverdale Jewish Center
- Riverdale Presbyterian Church
- Riverdale Temple
- St. Gabriel's Roman Catholic Church
- Saint Margaret of Cortona Church
- St Peter's Greek Orthodox Church
- Young Israel of Riverdale
- Young Israel Ohab Tzedek
- Kehilah of Riverdale

=== Community organizations ===
- Bronx Community Board 8 is a group of community members working under the mandate of the City Charter to monitor the delivery of city services, establish budget priorities, and influence land-use decisions.
- Riverdale Hatzalah Volunteer Ambulance Corp. is supported by community donations, and offers fast, reliable medical treatment and transport free of charge.
- Riverdale YM-YWHA is a community center for youth, adult and senior activities.
- Riverdale Children's Theater is a local theater company that has performed many pilot productions of musicals. This 501 c-3 theater arts program was founded in 2010 and offers a myriad of theater programs.

=== Museums ===
- Derfner Judaica Museum maintains a collection of approximately 1,400 objects used in traditional Jewish ceremonies and rituals, as well as Jewish art.
- Wave Hill, the former residence of Mark Twain among others, is a botanical garden featuring two preserved historic mansions. It has exhibit spaces with a rotating series of art exhibitions, and performance spaces with a noted series of concerts.

== Notable people ==
- Sean Altman (born 1961), musician, songwriter, and founder of Rockapella
- Baron Ambrosia, real name Justin Fornal, film director
- William Henry Appleton (1814–1899), publisher, lived at Wave Hill
- Hannelore Baron (1926–1987), artist known for the highly personal, book-sized, abstract collages and box constructions that she began exhibiting in the late 1960s.
- Béla Bartók (1881–1945), composer
- Bernard Bernstein (1928–2021), metalsmith and teacher
- Mario Biaggi (1917–2015), decorated policeman and US Congressman
- Rudolf Bing (1902–1997), former General Manager of the Metropolitan Opera
- Jonathan Brewster Bingham (1914–1986), member of the House of Representatives
- June Bingham Birge (1919–2007), author and playwright
- Ron Blomberg (born 1948), first designated hitter in baseball history
- Ted Brown (1924–2005), radio personality
- Alexander Calder (1898–1976), sculptor, lived in Spuyten Duyvil
- Alexander Stirling Calder (1870–1945), sculptor, father of Alexander Calder
- Chris Chambliss (born 1948), former first baseman and hitting coach
- Ronni Chasen (1946–2010), Hollywood publicist, murder victim
- R. Inslee Clark Jr. (1935–1999), educator and administrator who was a key player in the transition of the Ivy League into co-education in the 1960s.
- Seth Farber (born 1967), rabbi and historian
- Fernando Ferrer (born 1950), former Bronx Borough President
- Ella Fitzgerald (1917–1996), jazz singer
- Sidney Frey (1920–1968), Audio Fidelity Records, producer of the first stereo record
- Fred W. Friendly (1915–1998), former president of CBS News
- Julia Garner (born 1994), actress
- Lou Gehrig (1903–1941), New York Yankees baseball player
- Jordan Gelber (born 1975), actor
- Mark Goodman (born 1952), one of the five original MTV VJs
- Blu Greenberg (born 1936), writer specializing in Modern Orthodox Judaism and women's issues
- Irving Greenberg (born 1933), Modern Orthodox rabbi, Jewish-American scholar and author
- Nat Holman (1896–1995), Hall of Fame basketball player and CCNY coach
- Charles Evans Hughes, III (1915–1985), architect
- H. Stuart Hughes (1916–1999), professor and activist
- Richard Joel (born 1950), President of Yeshiva University
- Leatrice Joy (1893–1985), actress
- Eric Kandel (born 1929), Columbia University neuroscientist, Nobel laureate
- Ida Keeling (born 1915), runner, World Record holder for 100 meter women ages 96–100
- Eunice Kennedy (1921–2009), founder of the Special Olympics
- Joan Bennett Kennedy (born 1936), spouse of Senator Ted Kennedy
- John F. Kennedy (1917–1963), U.S. president, lived at 5040 Independence Avenue as a child
- Joseph P. Kennedy Sr. (1888–1969), patriarch of the Kennedy Family, US Ambassador to the UK, SEC Chairman
- Robert F. Kennedy (1925–1968), U.S. Senator, Attorney General and Presidential candidate
- Kathleen Kennedy Cavendish (1920–1948), Marchionness of Hartington, member of the Kennedy Family
- Bernard Kerik (born 1955), former New York City Police Commissioner
- Shabbos Kestenbaum (born 1999), antisemitism activist
- Theodore W. Kheel (1914–2010), labor lawyer
- G. Oliver Koppell (born 1940), former New York State Attorney General, former member of the New York City Council
- Fiorello H. La Guardia (1882–1947), Mayor of New York City during the 1930s and 1940s
- John L. Lahey (born 1946), president of Quinnipiac University
- Christopher Lehmann-Haupt (1934–2018), journalist, critic, and novelist
- Timothy "Speed" Levitch (born 1970), tour guide and voice actor
- Jack Lew (born 1955), United States Secretary of the Treasury
- Chris Lighty (1968–2012), music industry executive and hip-hop artist manager
- Sal Maglie (1917–1992), pitcher, played for the Brooklyn Dodgers, New York Giants, and New York Yankees
- Willie Mays (1931–2024), baseball star
- Sister Margaret McEntee (born 1935), Catholic nun and inspiration for Doubt: A Parable
- Tim Morehouse (born 1978), Olympic fencer
- Tracy Morgan (born 1968), comedian and actor
- Elie Nadelman (1882–1946), Polish/American sculptor
- Hugh Panero (born 1956), CEO of XM Satellite Radio from June 1998 to August 2007.
- George Walbridge Perkins (1862–1920), first president of the Palisades Interstate Park Commission
- Marjorie Perloff (1931–2024), poetry scholar and critic, known for her study of avant-garde poetry
- Jennifer Raab, president of Hunter College
- Ed Rendell (born 1944), Governor of Pennsylvania
- Alfonso Ribeiro (born 1971), actor, television director, dancer and show host
- Theodore Roosevelt Sr. (1831–1878), banker and father of the U.S. President
- Jonathan Rosenblatt (born 1956), former rabbi of the Riverdale Jewish Center
- Herschel Schacter (1917–2013), Orthodox rabbi who was chairman of the Conference of Presidents of Major American Jewish Organizations
- Jacob J. Schacter (born 1950), rabbi
- James H. Scheuer (1920–2005), member of the House of Representatives
- Ben Schwartz (born 1981), comedic actor
- David Shapiro (born 1947), poet and literary critic
- Carly Simon (born 1943), singer/songwriter
- Joanna Simon (1936–2022), mezzo-soprano
- Lucy Simon (born 1940), composer
- Richard L. Simon (1899–1960), co-founder of Simon & Schuster
- Morton Sobell (1917–2018), engineer who was a Soviet spy during and after World War II
- Regina Spektor (born 1980), singer-songwriter
- Eliot Spitzer (born 1959), former Governor and Attorney General of New York, born in Riverdale, attended Horace Mann
- U Thant (1909–1974), former United Nations Secretary-General
- Kool Keith Thornton (born 1964), hip-hop artist and founding member of the Ultramagnetic MCs
- Arturo Toscanini (1867–1957), conductor
- Rosalyn Tureck (1913–2003), pianist and harpsichordist known for the music of Johann Sebastian Bach
- Mark Twain (1835–1910), author
- Steven Tyler (born 1948), lead singer of rock band Aerosmith
- Neil deGrasse Tyson (born 1958), astrophysicist and television host
- Rebecca Walker (born 1969), writer
- Alexander S. Webb (1835–1911), Union Army general, recipient of Medal of Honor
- Avi Weiss (born 1944), activist Open Orthodox rabbi
- Tommy Wonder (1914–1993), dancer, actor, choreographer, and artist manager.
- Mitsuko Alexandra Yabe (born 1991), music editor
- Rosalyn Sussman Yalow (1921–2011), Nobel laureate

== In popular culture ==
Riverdale has often been cited in literature, film and television. Exteriors of many of Riverdale's locations have been used in both television and movie production.

Literature

- In On the Road, Horace Mann School–educated Jack Kerouac writes about getting off at a subway stop in Riverdale: "Filled with dreams of what I'd do in Chicago, in Denver, and then finally in San Fran, I took the Seventh Avenue Subway to the end of the line at 242nd Street, and there took a trolley into Yonkers; in downtown Yonkers I transferred to an outgoing trolley and went to the city limits on the east bank of the Hudson River."

Films

- In the film Once Upon a Time in America, the central character learns that the bodies of his three friends have been relocated to a mausoleum in Riverdale.
- In the 2013 remake of the film The Secret Life of Walter Mitty, Windsor South, an apartment building along the Henry Hudson Parkway, is shown.
- A few scenes in Law & Order: Special Victims Unit have been filmed in Riverdale.

Television

- On television's Mad Men, Joan Holloway reveals that she and her husband are considering relocating to Riverdale, explaining, "It's close to Columbia Presbyterian. Plus, Greg wants a yard".
