= Southern Jewish Historical Society =

The Southern Jewish Historical Society is an organization dedicated to documenting and interpreting the history of Jews in the American South. It was established in 1976 by Saul Viener. It hosts an annual academic conference, publishes the journal Southern Jewish History, offers grants for projects related to southern Jewish history, and awards regular prizes for work in the sub-field.
