= Marie Syrkin =

American writer (1899–1989)

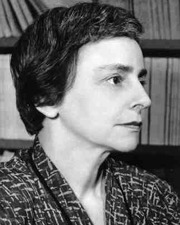
- Born: March 23, 1899; Bern, Switzerland
- Died: February 2, 1989 (aged 89); Santa Monica, California, US
- Spouse(s): Maurice Samuel (m. 1917, annulled) Aaron Bodansky (m. 1919; div. 1924) Charles Reznikoff (m. 1930; died 1976)

Signature
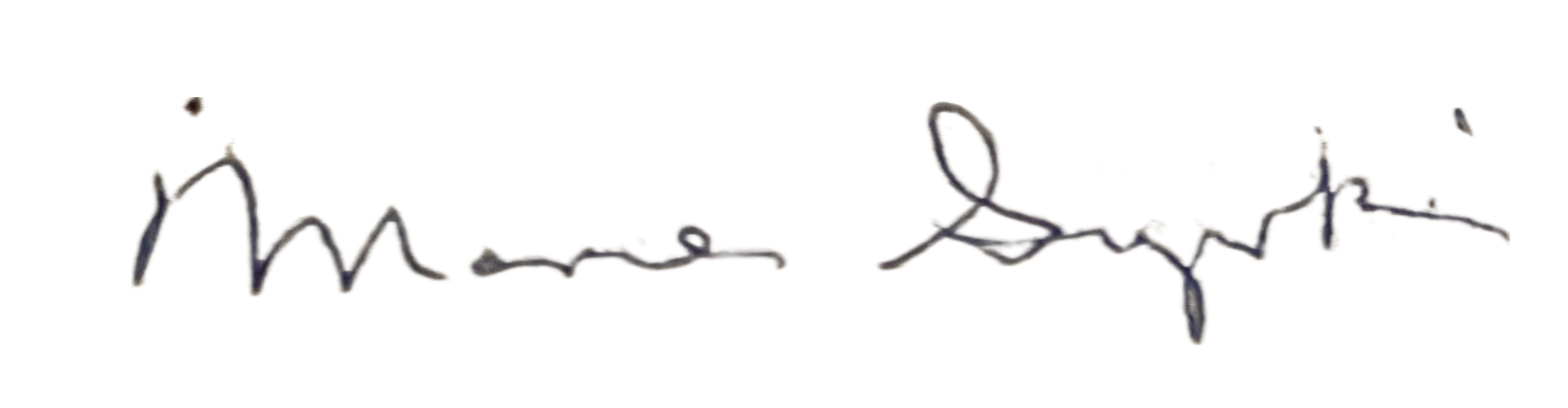

Marie Syrkin (March 23, 1899 – February 2, 1989) was an American writer, translator, educator, and Zionist activist.

== Biography ==
Born in Bern, Switzerland, she was the daughter of the Socialist Zionist theoretician Nachman Syrkin and his wife Bassya Syrkin (née Osnos), a feminist socialist Zionist. After stays in Germany and France, and the city of Vilna, in the Russian Empire (today, Vilnius, Lithuania), the family immigrated to the United States in 1908, settling in New York City, where Marie attended public school. Her mother died of tuberculosis, at the age of 36 at the Montefiore Hospital in the Bronx, on December 19 1914.

Marie, then aged 16, spent the summer of 1915 on her own at the Atlantic Hotel in Belmar New Jersey, on the boardwalk near the beach, a well known gathering place for Jewish intelligentsia that was owned by friends of her father whom he felt would look after her. There she recalled meeting such luminaries as Sholom Aleichem, Sholom Asch, Chaim Zhitlowsky and Pinchas Rutenberg as well as her future husband Maurice Samuel. Two years later on August 31, 1917, Marie and Maurice secretly eloped, marrying at city hall in Manhattan. When they informed her father the following weekend he was furious. Though Nahum Syrkin and Maurice Samuel shared many of the same political views, the elder Syrkin thought Marie was too intelligent and beautiful for Samuel who had little means, poor prospects and had already enlisted to go off to war. He filed for and received an annulment, claiming (falsely) that Marie was not yet of age. He did permit them to be engaged and the couple maintained a long distance relationship via mail after Samuel enlisted in the US Army, which gradually cooled until Syrkin broke it off on Feb 4, 1919.

In July 1918 she began studies at Cornell University, completing a bachelor's degree and going on to a master's, in English literature. During her time at Cornell she met Aaron Bodansky, a biochemist; the couple married in 1919, and had two sons. Their first child, Benya, who was born in 1921, died of whooping cough in late 1923, when Marie was pregnant with their second child, David, who was born in March 1924. (David Bodansky, 1924–2012, later became a physicist and chaired the Physics Department at the University of Washington in 1976-1984.) Around that time Syrkin and her husband separated and then divorced. In 1925 she moved to New York City with her infant son David, and became an English teacher at the Textile High School in Manhattan, a job she held for over two decades.

In 1930, Syrkin married the poet Charles Reznikoff, whom she had first met in 1927. Sometimes living in different cities, they remained married until his death, in 1976. In the summer of 1987 Syrkin visited Naropa Institute in Boulder, to take part in a week long conference on the Objectist Movement in American poetry of which her husband was an important member, Syrkin then in her late 80's was a lively participant, often disagreeing with Allen Ginsberg on the subject of her husband's poetry.

She visited Palestine for the first time in 1933. In this period she also began to publish English translations of Yiddish poetry. In 1934, she was a co-founder and joined the editorial staff of the New York-based Labor Zionist journal Jewish Frontier. From this time on she regularly published articles on Jewish cultural and political life, and current issues, in the Jewish Frontier and other publications, including the New York Times and the Jerusalem Post. From 1937 to 1942 she reported on the Nazi persecution of European Jewry, and advocated for the opening of Jewish immigration to British Mandate Palestine, and for the liberalization of the quota system that governed American immigration policy.

Syrkin's first book, Your School, Your Children, published in 1944, was an influential study of the American school system, in which she argued that schools should actively foster democratic values.

After the war, in 1947, she interviewed Jewish Holocaust survivors in displaced persons camps in Germany, on behalf of B'nai B'rith's Hillel program, to recruit candidates for scholarships to American universities. She traveled to Palestine around that time as well, and conducted interviews of Holocaust survivors there; these interviews became the basis of her book Blessed Is the Match (1947), which told the story of the Warsaw Ghetto Uprising and other acts of Jewish resistance against the Nazis.

She became the editor-in-chief of Jewish Frontier in 1948, and continued to lead the journal for 25 years.

In 1950 Syrkin was appointed associate professor of English literature at Brandeis University, two years after it was founded; she continued teaching there until 1966, when she retired as professor emerita. Among the courses she taught at Brandeis were courses on the literature of the Holocaust (possibly the earliest such university course), and American Jewish fiction.

Syrkin was a long time friend of Golda Meir and was the first to write a biography of her. In 1955 she edited and partially wrote Arnold Toynbee and the Jews: A Symposium, a collection of articles that first appeared in Jewish Frontier, taking issue with Arnold J. Toynbee's antisemitic characterization of Jews representing a fossilized culture. It also featuring authors such as theologian Reinhold Niebuhr, biblical archeologist William F. Albright, diplomat Abba Eban, Mordecai Kaplan and Horace Kallen.

== Works ==
Books

- Your School, Your Children: A Teacher Looks at What's Wrong with Our Schools. New York: L. B. Fischer, 1944
- Blessed is the Match: The Story of Jewish Resistance. New York: Knopf, 1947. Reprinted, Philadelphia: Jewish Publication Society, 1976. ISBN 9780827600867
- Way of Valor: A Biography of Golda Myerson. New York: Sharon Books, 1955
- Nachman Syrkin, Socialist Zionist: A Biographical Memoir / Selected Essays. New York: Herzl Press, 1961
- Golda Meir: Woman with a Cause. New York: Putnam, 1963. Revised edition published as: Golda Meir: Israel's Leader, 1969
- Gleanings: A Diary in Verse. Santa Barbara, CA: Rhythms Press, 1979
- The State of the Jews [collection of previously published essays]. Washington, DC: New Republic Books, 1980. ISBN 9780915220601

== Awards ==
- 1981: Solomon Bublick Award, Hebrew University of Jerusalem
