= Governor Janszoon =

Governor Janszoon may refer to:

- Jan Janszoon (born 1570s), Governor of Salé (ceremonial) from 1623 to 1627
- Willem Janszoon (1570s–1630), Governor of Banda from 1623 to 1627
