= Polacca =

Type of ship used in the 17th–19th centuries

A polacca (or polacre) is a type of seventeenth- to nineteenth-century sailing vessel.

== Structure ==
Sail plan for a polacre.

The name is the feminine of "Polish" in the Italian language. The polacca was frequently seen in the Mediterranean. It had two or three single-pole masts, the three-masted vessels often with a lateen hoisted on the foremast (which was slanted forward to accommodate the large lateen yard) and a gaff or lateen on the mizzen mast. The mainmast was square-rigged after the European style.

== History ==
Special polaccas were used by Murat Reis, whose ships had lateen sails in front and fore-and-aft rig behind.

Some polacca pictures show what appears to be a ship-rigged vessel (sometimes with a lateen on the mizzen) with a galley-like hull and single-pole masts. Thus, the term "polacca" seems to refer primarily to the masting and possibly the hull type as opposed to the type of rig used for the sails. Two-masted polaccas were referred to as brig-polaccas with square sails on both masts. Three-masted polaccas were called ship-polaccas or polacca-settees.

Captain Jack Aubrey in HMS Sophie captures a French polacre laden with corn and general merchandise in Patrick O'Brian's first Aubrey-Maturin novel, Master and Commander (1969).

=== Mughal Empire ===
"Great Mogul" emperor's fleet of Polacca ships were harboured at seaports like Calicut and Pulicat, it was a fleet that controlled Cape Comorin.

== Gallery ==
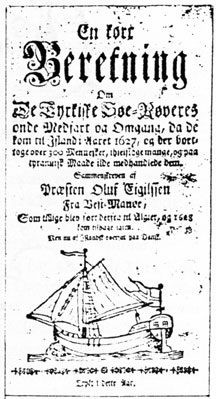
Polacca of Murat Reis the Younger

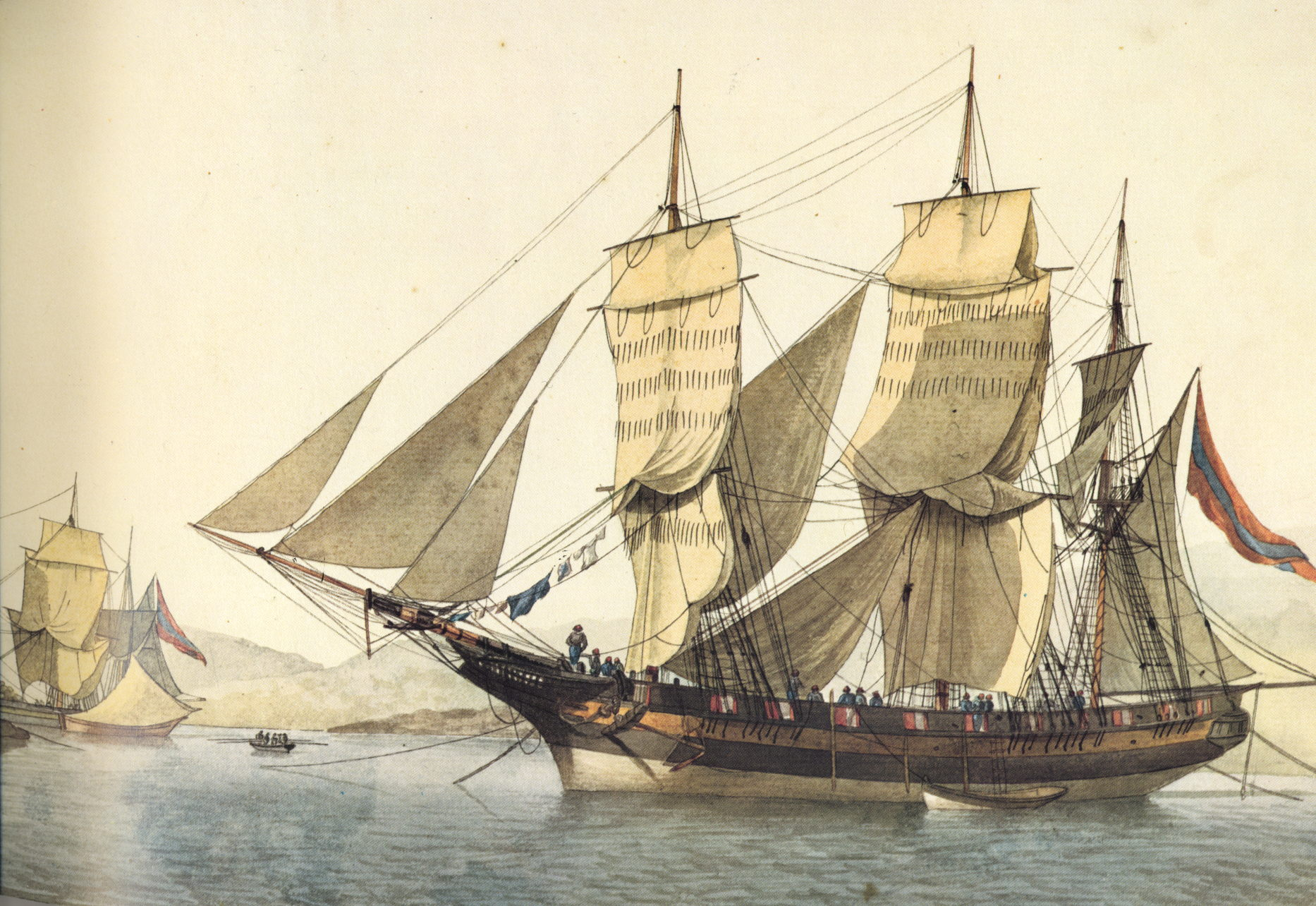
The Greek polacca San Nicolo, by Antoine Roux

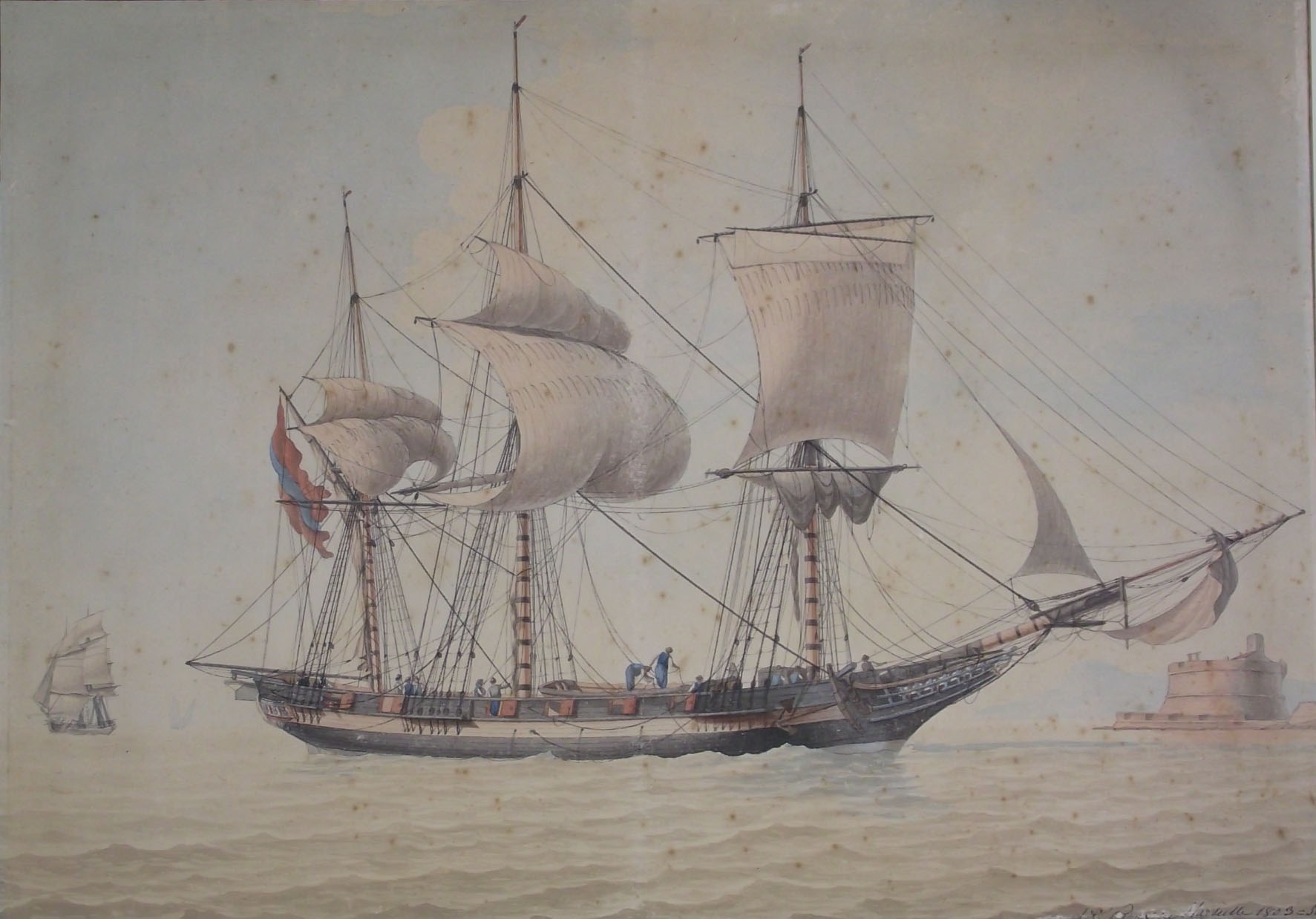
The Greek polacca Bella Aurora , by Antoine Roux

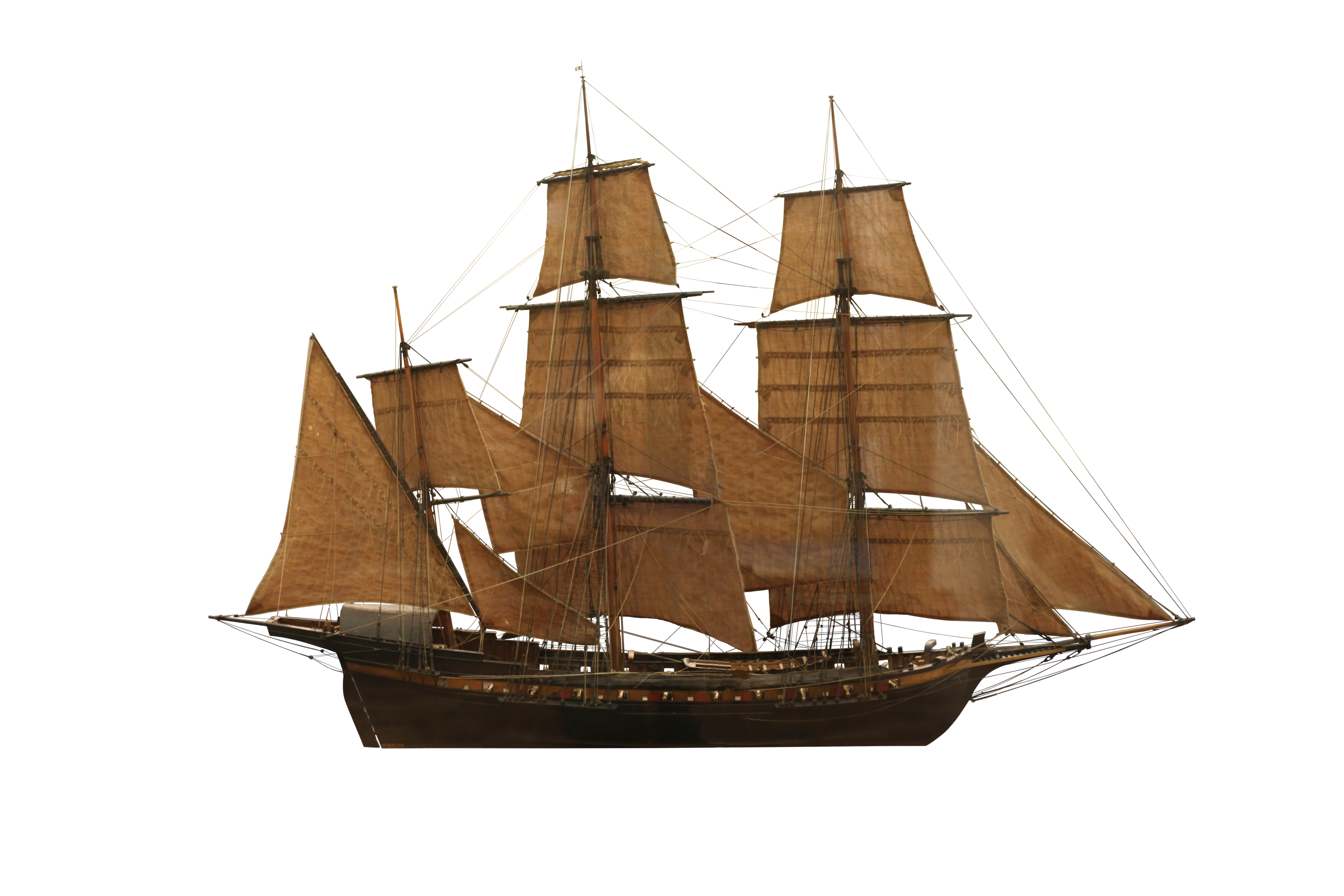
Squared-rigged Polacca of the 1780-1815 period.

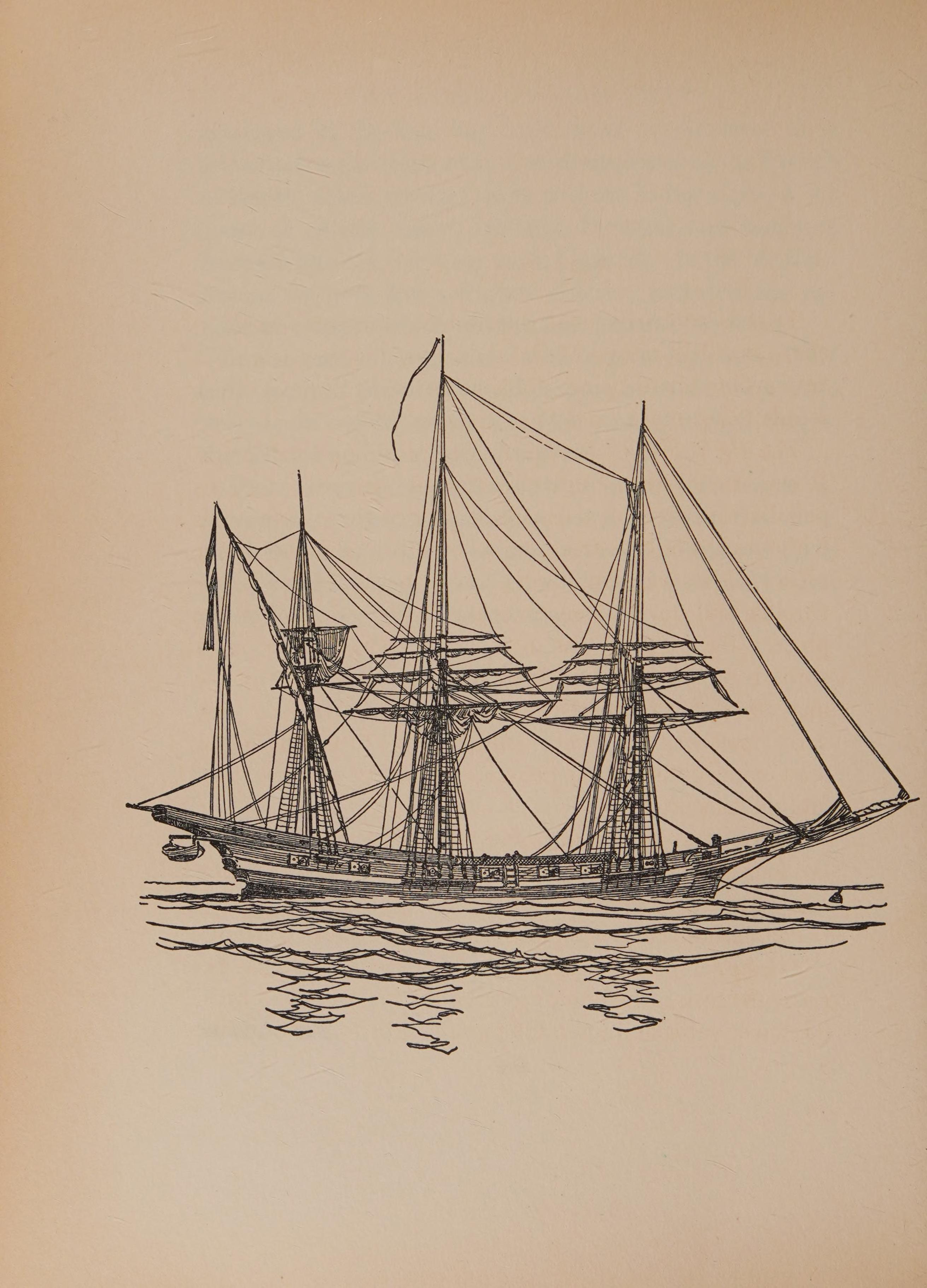
A polacca; pen-and-ink plate by Gordon Grant, The Book of Old Ships (1924)

== See also ==
- Ganj-i-Sawai
