= Andries Hudde =

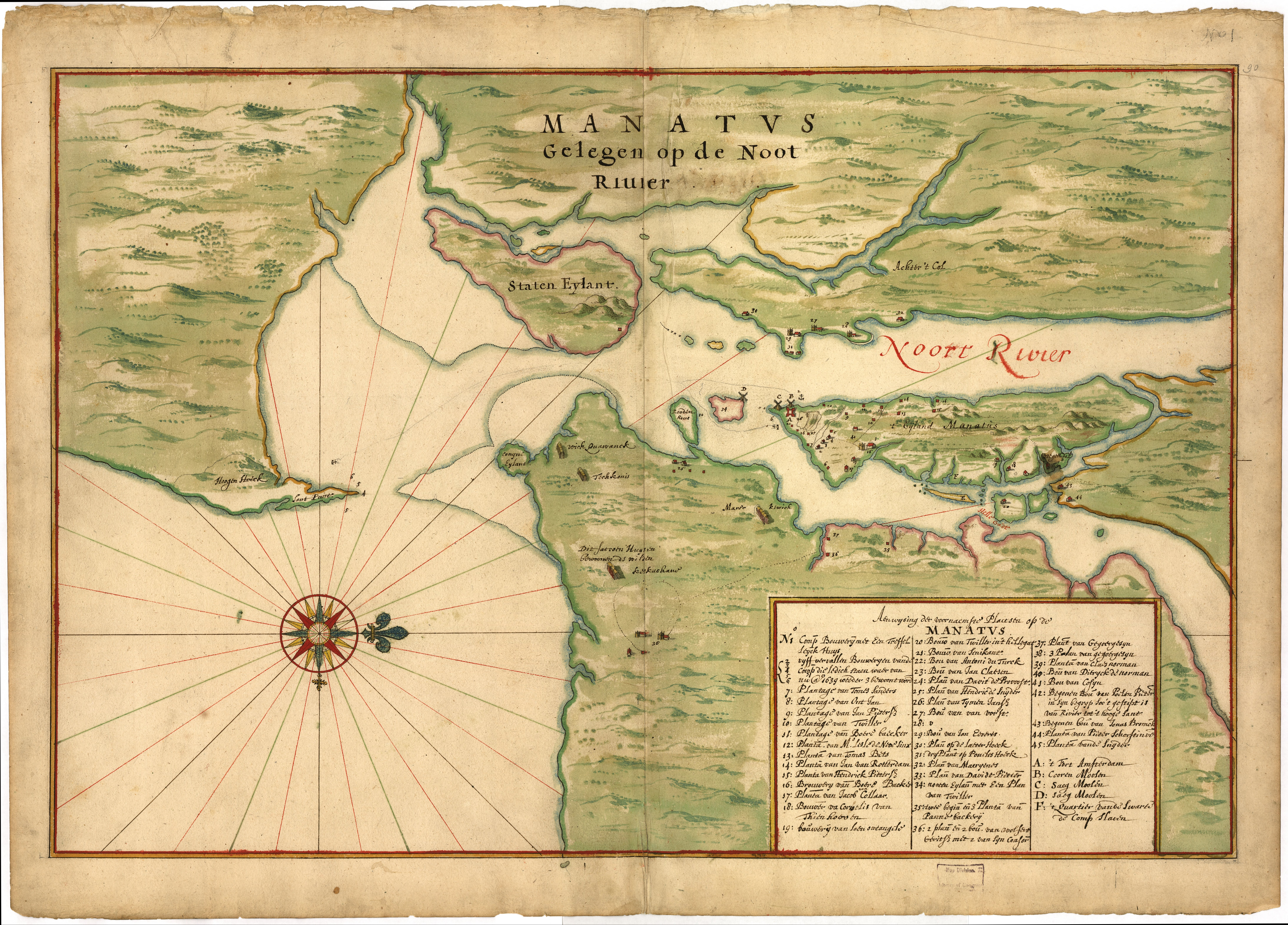
The "Manatus Map" of 1639, possibly drawn by Andries Hudde or Johannes Vingboons.

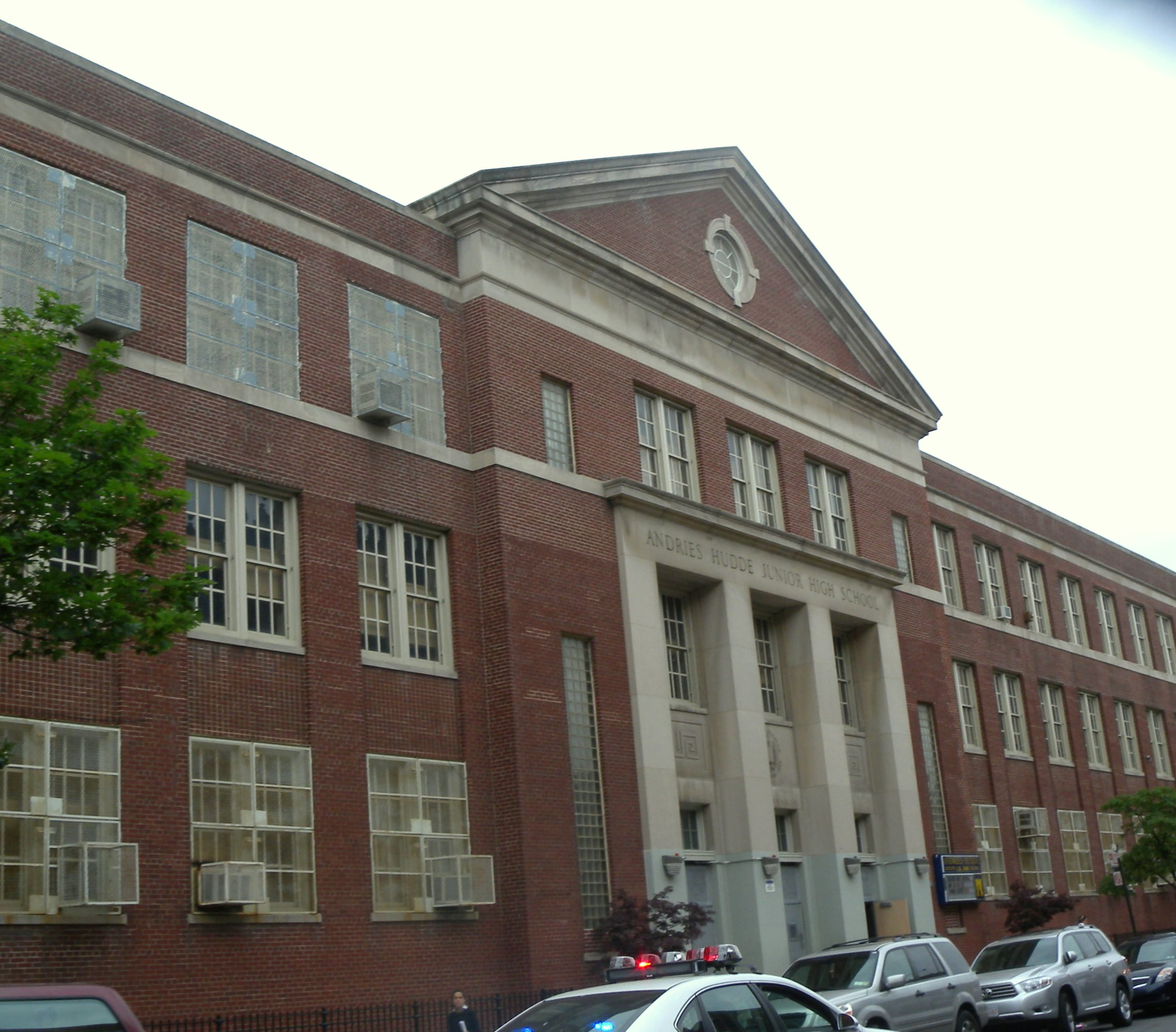
Andries Hudde Junior High School, in modern Midwood, Brooklyn.

Andries Hudde (1608–1663) was a landowner and colonial official of New Netherland.

== Early life and New Amsterdam ==
Andries Hudde was born in Kampen, Overijssel in the Netherlands in 1608 to Hendrick Hudde (himself son of the local burgomaster Rutger Hudde) and Aeltje Schinckels.

Arriving in the New World in 1629, Hudde was appointed to the New Netherland Council under Wouter van Twiller from 1633-1637, served as the first Surveyor General of the colony in 1642-1647 (he was the first surveyor in the colony at all after Kryn Fredericksz, the builder of Fort Amsterdam), and in a commercial capacity served as first commissary of wares.

His main personal residence in Manhattan was at Lot 11, Block C, on the Castello Plan drawn by his successor as Surveyor-General Jacques Cortelyou (this is today approximately 42 Broadway - Breede weg, which was already a prominent road).

Hudde was the subject of slanderous testimony in a lawsuit of Everardus Bogardus against Anthony Janszoon van Salee, that he was possibly the biological father of Grietse Reyniers's child. In 1636, he and another commissary are recorded as starting (and losing) a physical fight with a trumpeter who interrupted a party for David Pietersz. de Vries, an incident that inspired Washington Irving's character of Anthony Van Corlaer.

A prominent landowner, Hudde purchased a deed for land in Flatlands and Flatbush with Wolphert Gerretse in 1636, where the Achtervelt ("back fields") farm was established, and he was the first person to be granted a legal land conveyance in the colony in 1638 for the Muscoota farm (by modern Morningside Park in Harlem) through his fiancée Gertrude Bornstra, the widow of Hendrick de Forest (son of Jessé de Forest). He briefly returned to the Netherlands in 1638-39 to marry her, though in their absence the Harlem land was actually acquired by Johannes de la Montagne (brother-in-law to de Forest) through a lawsuit and court sale, and was renamed Vredendael farm.

== Delaware Valley and later life ==
Hudde took a military role as commissary of Fort Nassau on the Delaware River that challenged New Sweden's Johan Björnsson Printz in 1644 or 1645, and wrote a report on conditions of the Swedes on the Delaware which is preserved.

Hudde's first wife, Gertrude Bornstra, died in 1652. In this year, he also returned to New Amsterdam, where he stayed till 1655. While there in 1654, he was reappointed as Surveyor General and filed an application to serve as a voorleser (though it is unclear if he ever served in that religious education capacity).

After the total victory by Director-General Peter Stuyvesant's expeditionary force against the Swedes in 1655 (in the context of the European Second Northern War), Hudde returned to the Delaware Valley, and held a number of offices in the newly-annexed New Amstel colony. He was remarried there in 1657 to a woman recorded only as "Geertie".

Hudde died in Appoquinimink in modern Delaware in 1663 while on the way to Maryland to open a brewery.

== Legacy ==
Hudde was a character in the 1912 Philadelphia historical pageant directed by Ellis Paxson Oberholtzer, as the Prologue, Scene IV, features the confrontation between Hudde and New Sweden governor Johan Björnsson Printz. Over three hundred years after the granting of the Hudde and Gerritse patent in southern Brooklyn, a lawsuit as late as 1939 ruled on the rights of the heirs of Elbert Elbertson, who had acquired it after them, to the land that became Marine Park.

Hudde Junior High School was built in 1951 in a neighborhood that was part of the southern Brooklyn patent. An urban legend or misunderstanding formerly popular among students of Hudde's fanciful life as a pirate is mentioned by children's book author Eric Kimmel as an inspiration for some of his writing. This is untrue, although fellow Brooklyn landowner Anthony Janszoon van Salee was the son of a famous pirate. The school is adjacent to Andries Playground.
