= Spuyten Duyvil, Bronx =

Neighborhood in New York City

Spuyten Duyvil
- Neighborhood of the Bronx
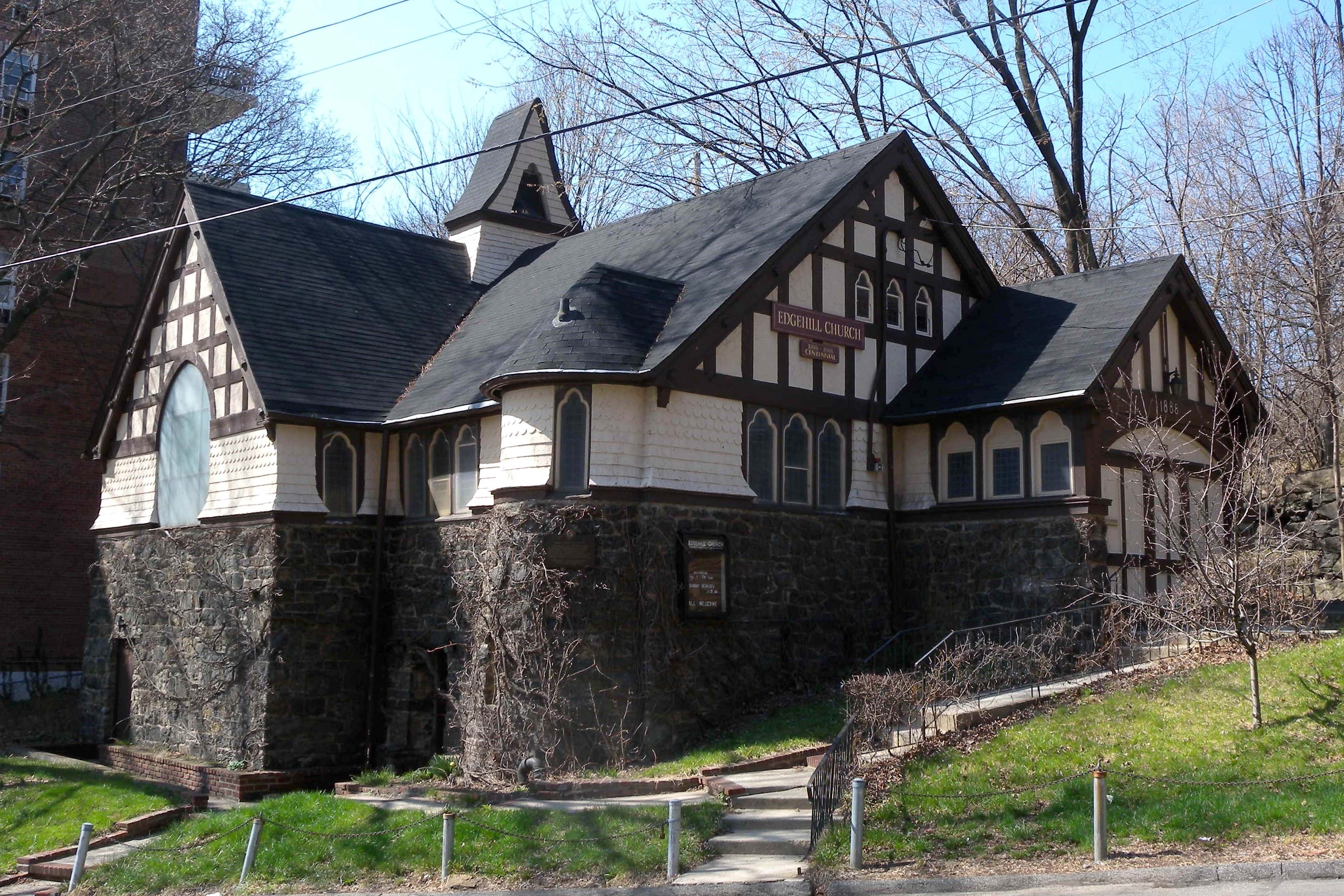
- Looking northwest at Edgehill Church of Spuyten Duyvil
- Location in New York City
- Coordinates: 40.881°N 73.917°W
- Country: United States
- State: New York
- City: New York City
- Borough: The Bronx
- Community District: The Bronx 8

Area
  - Total: 0.473 sq mi (1.23 km^{2})

Population (2011)
  - Total: 10,279
  - Density: 21,700/sq mi (8,390/km^{2})

Economics
  - Median income: $83,381
- ZIP Codes: 10463, 10471
- Area code: 718, 347, 929, and 917
- Website: www.spuytenduyvil.nyc

Spuyten Duyvil (/ˈspaɪtən ˈdaɪvəl/, SPY-tən-DY-vəl) is a neighborhood of the Bronx, New York City. It is bounded on the north by Riverdale, on the east by Kingsbridge, on the south by the Harlem River, and on the west by the Hudson River. Some consider it to be the southernmost part of Riverdale.

== Etymology ==
The area is named after Spuyten Duyvil Creek. "Spuyten Duyvil" may be literally translated as "Spouting Devil" or Spuitende Duivel in Dutch, a reference to the strong and wild tidal currents found at that location. It may also be translated as "Spewing Devil" or "Spinning Devil", or more loosely as "Devil's Whirlpool" or "Devil's Spate." Spui is a Dutch word involving outlets for water. Historian Reginald Pelham Bolton, however, argues that the phrase means "spouting meadow", referring to a fresh-water spring at Inwood Hill.

An additional translation, "to spite the Devil" or "in spite of the devil", was popularized by a story in Washington Irving's A Knickerbocker's History of New York published in 1809. Set in the 1660s, the story tells of trumpeter Antony Van Corlear summoned by "Peter de Groodt" to warn settlers of an attempted British invasion, with Corlear attempting to swim across the "Harlean river" from Fort Amsterdam to the Bronx mainland "in spite of the devil (spyt den duyvel)", Irving writes. The treacherous current pulled him under and he lost his life. This resulted in the name "Spuyten Duyvil" for "the adjoining promontory, which projects into the Hudson."

An extensive appendix to Studies in Etymology and Etiology (2009) by David L. Gold, which includes commentary by Rob Rentenaar, professor of onomastics at the University of Amsterdam, goes into great detail about all the various translations for "Spuyten Duyvil" which have been mooted over the years. Rentenaar concludes that "Duyvil" means "devil", either literally or in a transferred sense, but he could not determine what the intended meaning of "Spuyten" was because of the many variants that have been used throughout history.

The creek was referred to as Shorakapok by Lenape Native Americans in the area, translated as "the sitting-down place" or "the place between the ridges".

== History ==
In the late 17th century, Frederick Philipse, the lord of Philipse Manor in Westchester County, received permission to construct a bridge across Spuyten Duyvil Creek and charge tolls. "King's Bridge", which was located roughly south of and parallel to where West 230th Street lies today, opened in 1693.

Development of the neighborhood began in the latter half of the 19th century once the New York Central and Hudson River Railroad came through. The tracks originally crossed Spuyten Duyvil Creek and into Manhattan on the west side, but Cornelius Vanderbilt wanted to consolidate his railroad operations into one terminal, so he had tracks laid along the north side of the Harlem River so that trains coming south from Albany could join with the Harlem and New Haven lines and come into Manhattan down Fourth Avenue into his new Grand Central Depot. This is the route still used by Metro-North today.

Through the 1920s development of the Spuyten Duyvil neighborhood continued. Large high-rise apartment buildings, which later became condominiums and cooperatives, began to be built in the 1950s and continued through the 1980s, bringing in affluent families attracted by its scenic qualities, as well as by the area's closeness to desirable neighborhoods such as Fieldston and Riverdale.

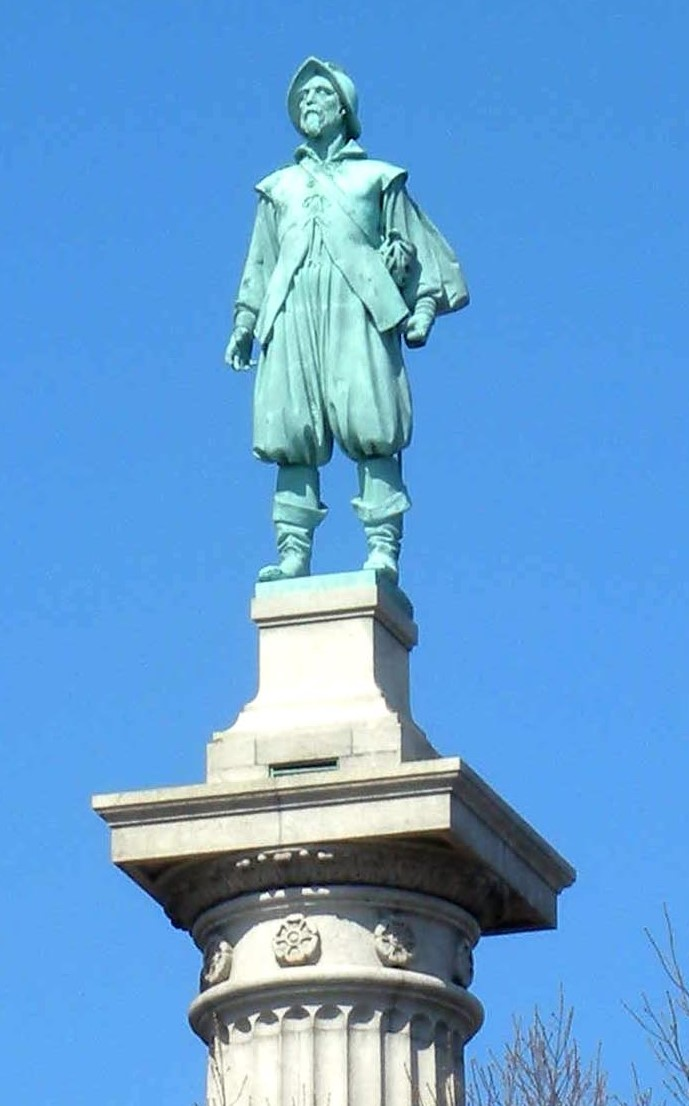
Statue of Henry Hudson on top of a tall column at Henry Hudson Park in Spuyten Duyvil

On July 18, 2013, a freight train derailed near the Spuyten Duyvil station due to an excessively wide gauge at one point. No one was killed or injured. Less than six months later, on December 1, a commuter train derailment near the Spuyten Duyvil station resulted in 4 deaths and over 70 injuries, 11 of them critical. The cause of the second derailment was determined to be excessive speed.

== Demographics ==
Based on data from the 2010 United States census, the population of Kingsbridge and Spuyten Duyvil was 30,161, a change of 289 (1%) from the 29,872 counted in 2000. Covering an area of 540.92 acres (218.90 ha), the neighborhood had a population density of 55.8 inhabitants per acre (35,700/sq mi; 13,800/km^{2}).

The racial makeup of the neighborhoods were 49.3% (14,872) White, 8.9% (2,691) African American, 0.1% (40) Native American, 5.7% (1,731) Asian, 0% (15) Pacific Islander, 0.3% (98) from other races, and 1.7% (510) from two or more races. Hispanic or Latino of any race were 33.8% (10,204) of the population.

A restaurant guide once described the neighborhood as "upper middle class".

== Police and crime ==
Spuyten Duyvil is patrolled by the 50th Precinct of the NYPD, located at 3450 Kingsbridge Avenue. The 50th Precinct ranked 13th safest out of 69 patrol areas for per-capita crime in 2010.

The 50th Precinct has a lower crime rate than in the 1990s, with crimes across all categories having decreased by 69.9% between 1990 and 2022. The precinct reported three murders, 22 rapes, 185 robberies, 213 felony assaults, 126 burglaries, 695 grand larcenies, and 288 grand larcenies auto in 2022.

== Library ==
The New York Public Library (NYPL) operates the Spuyten Duyvil branch at 650 West 235th Street. The one-story branch opened in 1971 and was designed by Giorgio Cavaglieri.

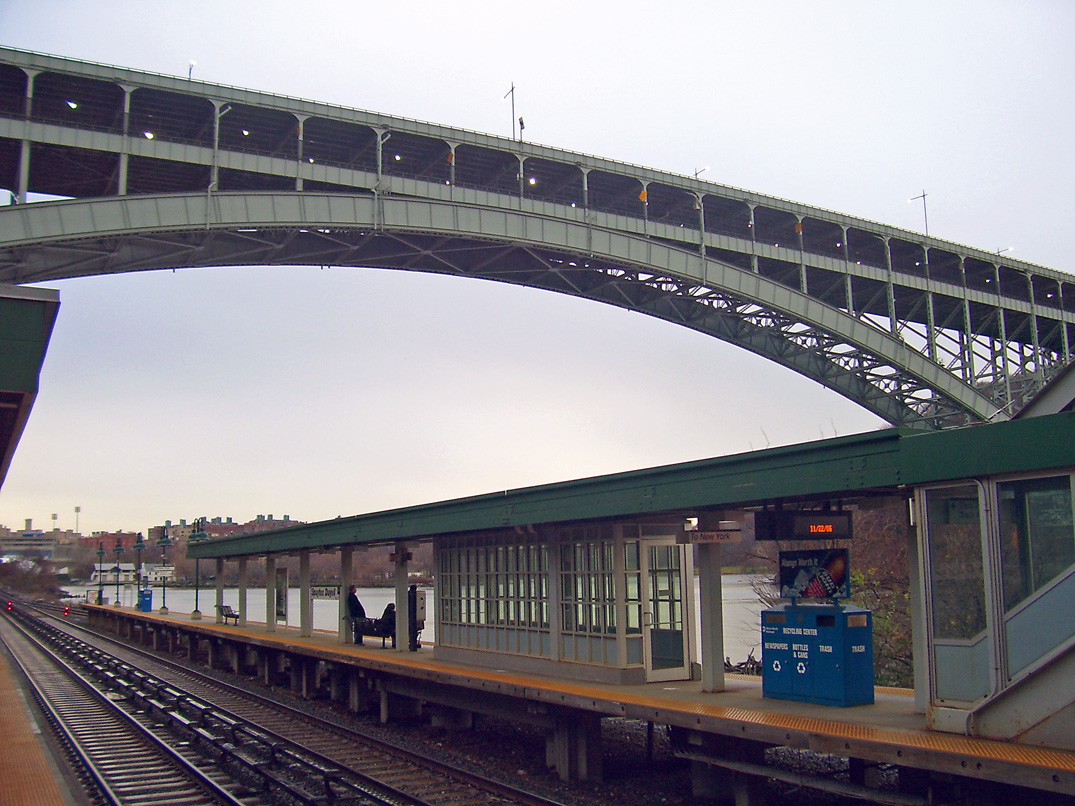
The Spuyten Duyvil train station with Henry Hudson Bridge above

== Transportation ==
The following MTA Regional Bus Operations bus routes serve Spuyten Duyvil:

- Bx1: to Third Avenue–138th Street station (via Grand Concourse)
- Bx7: to 168th Street station, Manhattan (via Riverdale Avenue, and Broadway)
- Bx10: to Norwood–205th Street station (via Riverdale Avenue, Henry Hudson Parkway, and Johnson Avenue)
- Bx20: to Inwood–207th Street station, Manhattan (via Henry Hudson Parkway, and Johnson Avenue)

Spuyten Duyvil is the location of the Spuyten Duyvil train station, which is served by the Hudson Line of the Metro-North Railroad, providing service into Grand Central Terminal and north into Westchester County. Spuyten Duyvil Bridge, a railroad swing bridge that carries Amtrak's Empire Corridor line between New York City and Albany, spans Spuyten Duyvil Creek. The north end of the Henry Hudson Bridge connects the neighborhood to the island of Manhattan via the Henry Hudson Parkway.

Hudson Rail Link connects the Metro-North station to the surrounding area, with Routes J, K, L, and M serving Spuyten Duyvil.

== Points of interest ==
- Edgehill Church of Spuyten Duyvil (former United Church of Christ) was built in 1888–89 as a chapel of the Riverdale Presbyterian Church located nearby, for the use of workers at the giant Johnson Iron Foundry which was located nearby at the time. It was designed by Francis H. Kimball in an eclectic mix of styles: Romanesque Revival, Tudor Revival and Shingle style. The church was designated a New York City landmark in 1980. As of 2022, the church has closed, and the building is the headquarters of the Kingsbridge Historical Society, the oldest historical society in the Bronx.
- Henry Hudson Memorial Park features the Henry Hudson Monument, a 16-foot (4.9 m) bronze statue of Henry Hudson sculpted by Karl Bitter and Karl Gruppe on top of a 100-foot (30 m) Doric column by architect Walter Cook of the firm of Babb, Cook & Willard. The column was raised by public subscription c.1912 after the Hudson-Fulton Celebration of 1909, but the project stalled when funds ran out, and Bitter died in 1915. The Heroic statue of Henry Hudson was redesigned and completed by Gruppe – a student of Bitter – based on Bitter's plaster model. It was added by Robert Moses' Henry Hudson Parkway Authority in 1938, along with the two bas-relief panels at the column's base, also by Gruppe. The south panel shows Hudson receiving his commission from the Dutch East India Company, and the north panel shows Native Americans and Europeans at the first Dutch trading post on Manhattan Island. The monument was dedicated on January 6, 1938.
- Villa Charlotte Brontë is a co-op apartment complex of two small three-story buildings at 2501 Palisade Avenue, containing 17 units, each with a different floor plan. It was built in 1926 and designed by Robert W. Gardner in the style of an Italian villa for attorney, developer and preservationist John Jay McKelvey Sr. (Note: Gardner also designed the Staten Island Institute of Arts and Sciences, which became the Staten Island Museum.) Similar in concept to garden apartments, it is regarded as one of the first apartment buildings in the Bronx. The complex overlooks the Hudson River – McKelvey advertised the apartments in The New York Times, as being for anyone whose "soul is hungry for the majesty of the river" – and many of the apartments have views of the Palisades in New Jersey. The building is not landmarked, and a companion building, the seven-apartment cottage-like Villa Rosa Bonheur at 2395 Palisade Avenue, built in 1924, was torn down in 2019 after failing as a co-op in 1941. It kept on as a private home for decades afterwards until it was sold to a developer, who replaced it with an undistinguished apartment building, to the distress of the neighborhood. Villa Victoria (1927), a more ordinary Tudor-style apartment building, located between the other two "villas", still remains standing at 2475 Palisade Avenue, although McKelvey did lose possession of it in a foreclosure.

== Notable people ==
- Alexander Calder (1898–1976), sculptor best known for his innovative mobiles
- Hamilton Holt (1872–1951), educator, editor, author and politician, who was President of Rollins College
- William Sergeant Kendall (1869–1938), artist
- Georgina Klitgaard (1893–1976), artist known for panoramic landscape paintings
- John Jay McKelvey Sr. (1863–1947), attorney, Park District Protection League Trustee, developer and preservationist
- Joan Tetzel (1921–1977), actress

== See also ==
- Hell Gate
- List of place names of Dutch origin
