= Anthony Janszoon van Salee =

Dutch colonist and merchant (1607–1676)

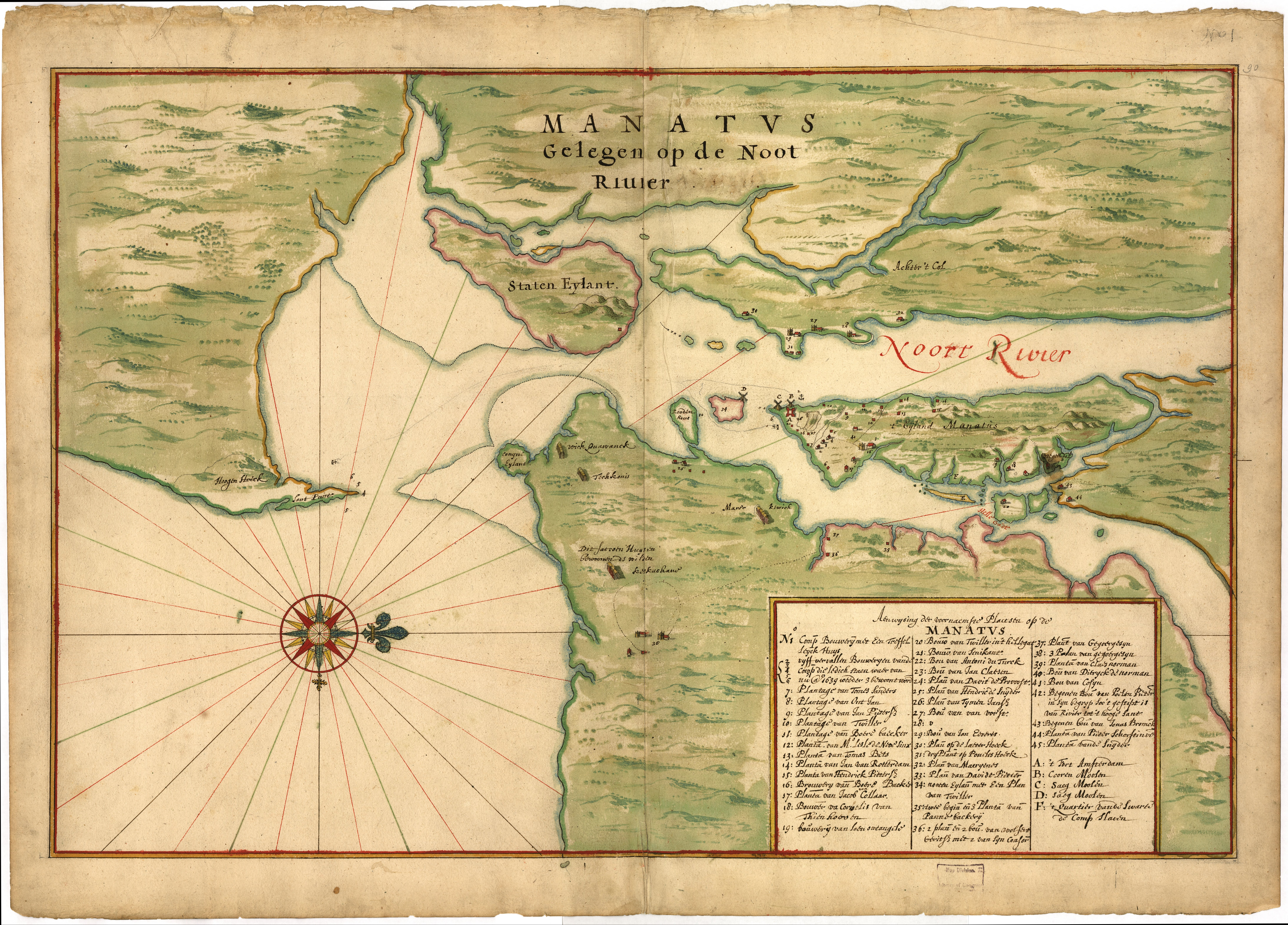
Manatus Map drawn in 1639 showing van Salee's Wallenstein property in Lower Manhattan

Anthony Janszoon van Salee (Note: Variations on name elements: "Anthonie", "Jansz." or "Jansen", "from Salee" and "van Vaes" or "van Fees".) (1607–1676) was an original settler of and prominent landholder, merchant, and creditor in New Netherland, a 17th-century colonial province of the Dutch Republic located on the modern-day East Coast of the United States. Van Salee was commonly known as Anthony the Turk due to his abrasive personality. He may have been the first free Muslim settler in the land that would later become the United States. He was recorded as owning a Quran. He also have had North African or Middle Eastern heritage through his mother—while Anthony's line married into European families (with Vanderbilt and other patrician descendants).

Van Salee and his first wife Grietse were the subject of considerable scandal and litigation in New Amsterdam, leading to his role in the establishment of Gravesend and New Utrecht, as well as other settlements on Long Island.

A theory first posited by a local historian in the 19th century, and repeated widely into the 2020s, holds that Van Salee was the son of Jan Janszoon, who had converted to Islam upon his capture by Barbary pirates. However, the timing renders this impossible. Janszoon was in Haarlem in the year of Van Sallee's birth, while all records indicate that Van Sallee was born in Cartagena, Spain; furthermore the Haarlem birth records are complete and do not record the birth of an Anthony Janszoon van Salee. Under Dutch Reformed naming conventions, Jan Janszoon's firstborn son would have been named Jan.

Van Salee owned the Wallenstein property in Lower Manhattan, but he and his first wife Grietse were the subject of considerable scandal and litigation in New Amsterdam, leading to his role in the establishment of Gravesend and New Utrecht, as well as other settlements on Long Island, including Coney Island. He returned to Manhattan, and by 1674, was listed in "The 1,000", a tax list of the wealthiest citizens of now-New York. He is said to be buried beneath the Harriman Building on Broadway in Lower Manhattan.

== Early life ==
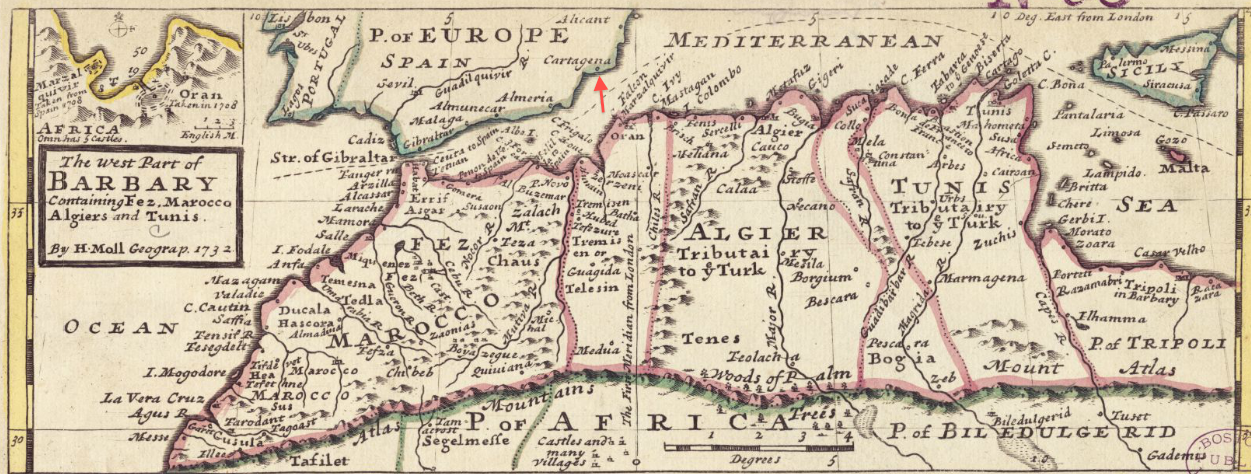
1736 Herman Moll map, Cartagena in red

Anthony Janszoon van Salee was born in 1607 in Cartagena, Spain. It is possible that he was kidnapped as a child and held as a galley slave on the vessel of Muslim convert Jan Janszoon, which washed ashore in the Netherlands in 1623.

Van Salee obtained a marriage license on December 15, 1629, in Amsterdam to marry Grietse Reyniers, a 27-year-old German native from Wesel. She had been a widow for 2 years following the death of Aelbert Egberts from Haarlem, and formally worked in Pieter de Winter's tavern. The New York Genealogical and Biographical Society has suggested he hid his pirate background to get a marriage license. The Dutch West India Company regulated immigration, including religion, with a preference to the Dutch Reformed religion in public.

According to Dutch records, at the time of the license issue, he was Anthonis Jansz, a seaman born in 1607 in Cartagena, Spain and staying at Haringpakkerij, now Prins Hendrikkade, where global sailors converged on the IJ Harbor. His parents weren't present. The license was issued two days before their ship sailed and they eloped on board. It is believed Anthony preferred a ship captain instead of a Dutch minister to marry him.

In 1630, at the age of 22, van Salee arrived with his wife in New Netherland, as a colonist of the Dutch West India Company. By 1632, there were only about 300 residents in New Amsterdam, mostly huddled in homes near the fort on Manhattan Island.

== Arrival in New Amsterdam ==
In New Amsterdam, all records prior to 1638 are not available. By 1638, he had become van Salee. In 1638, he acquired a farm on the island of Manhattan which was named "Wallenstein", in memory of Albrecht von Wallenstein, supreme commander of the armies of the Habsburg monarchy. The plot was located on the north side of the defensive stockade across Lower Manhattan, along present-day Wall Street. The bouwery was surveyed from Broadway to the East River between Ann Street and Maiden Lane. Van Salee transferred the deed the following year.

At the sale of this property to Cornelis van Tienhoven, it was noted "that he had found 12 apple, 40 peach, 73 cherry trees, 26 sage plants.., behind the house sold by Anthony Janszoon van Salee to Barent Dirksen [Dutchmen],... ANNO 18th of June 1639." This is one of the first references to cherry trees being planted in North America.

By 1639, at the age of 32, Anthony had become one of the largest landholders on the island of Manhattan, as well as a prosperous farmer. His property on Manhattan Island is included on the Manatus Map of that year.

== Initial disputes ==
Between 1638 and 1639, the couple accounted for fifteen of ninety-three recorded court cases. During this period, many private quarrels were brought to the Dutch colonial court. The charges against the couple included petty slander, brought by Anneke and Dominee Bogardus (a minister) after Grietse accused of them of lying; Grietse's display of private parts to the naval fleet, and van Salee's occasions of drunkenness.

Van Salee was engaged in many legal disputes, which ranged from demands for compensation because his dog attacked the hog of Anthony the Portuguese (described as a black townsman), to charges that he had pointed loaded pistols at slave overseers from the Dutch West India Company. He is said to have defended the weak, and learned in the pirate port of Salé growing up the respect of fear.

It is unclear to what extent animus against Van Salee's ethnic and religious identity drove these conflicts, or if he was himself reluctant to submit to church authority. Following numerous legal disputes, including with representatives of the Dutch Reformed Church, whose council reprimanded van Salee and his wife for not behaving as "pious Christians", he was ordered to leave New Netherland.

== Turk's Plantation ==
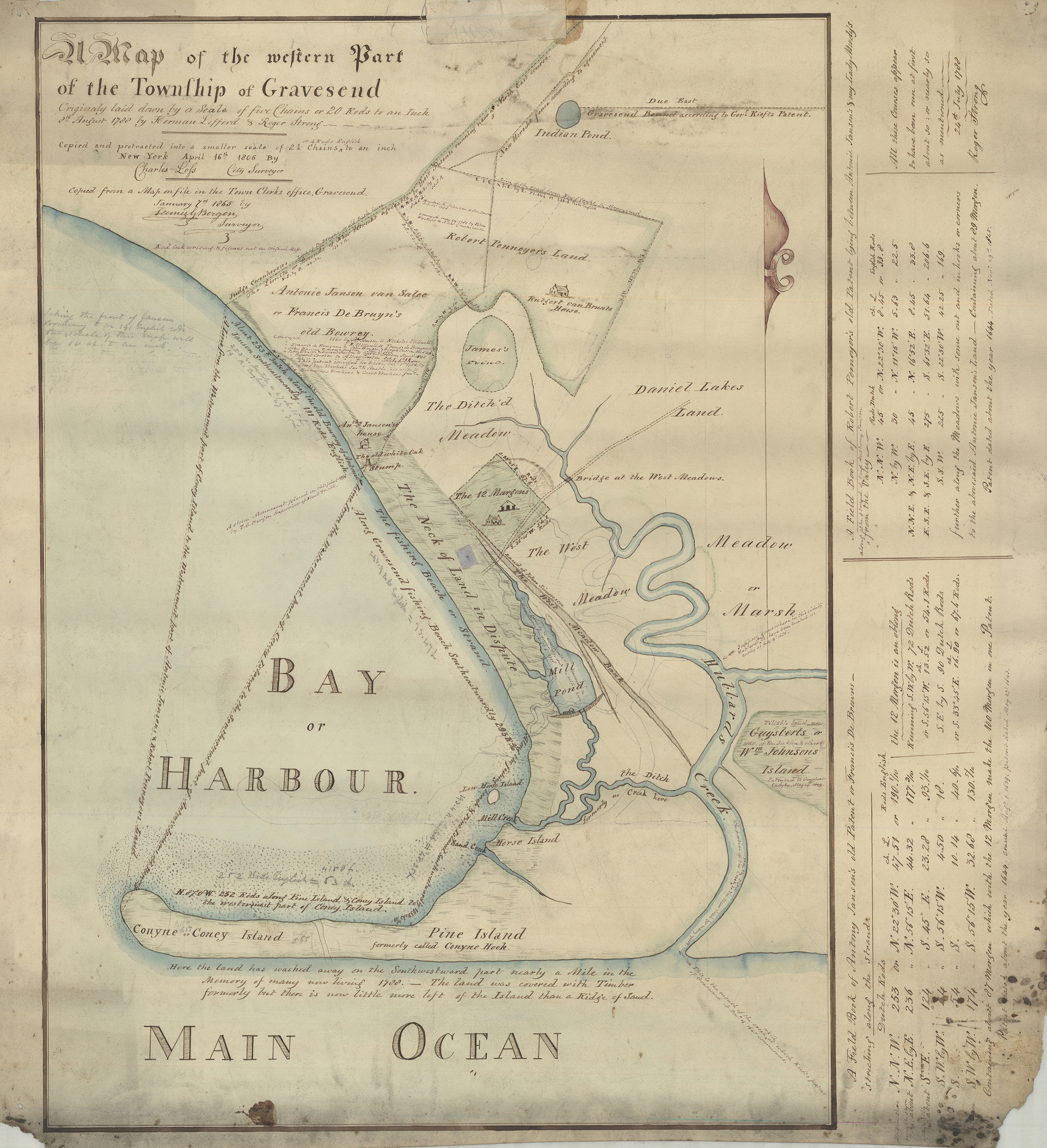
Map of van Salee former properties and house at Turk's Plantation from 1788 lawsuit, printed in 1806.

After he appealed to the Dutch West India Company, van Salee was allowed to settle on Long Island. Though his first application for land on Gravesend Bay was not accepted, Director Willem Kieft in 1643 (backdated to 1639) deeded him 100 Morgens — 200 acres (0.81 km^{2}) acquired from Penhawitz in what would become New Utrecht and Gravesend, and specifically in the modern sub-neighborhood of Bath Beach, Brooklyn. Van Salee rented goats for the farm from Andries Hudde. This property was popularly known as the "Turk's plantation", and after a lease to Edmund Audley in 1646 and subsequent sale to Nicholas Stilwell in 1660 (which van Salee tried to retract) and then Francis de Bruyn in 1664, it became known as Bruynnsberg or the Old Bowery. (Note: Placename variants: "Bruynenberg" or "Old Bowerye".) It also appears that perhaps one of the islands in the bay was known as "Turk's island". He became one of the largest and most prominent landholders on the island, owning the main farm and also a more southerly smaller one to which it was loosely associated, known as "The 12 Morgens". In 1643 his Long Island property was also subject to a raid by the English privateer Seven Stars who stole 200 pumpkins, but abandoned their quest for the hogs on Coney Island after learning that those were owned by Deborah, Lady Moody.

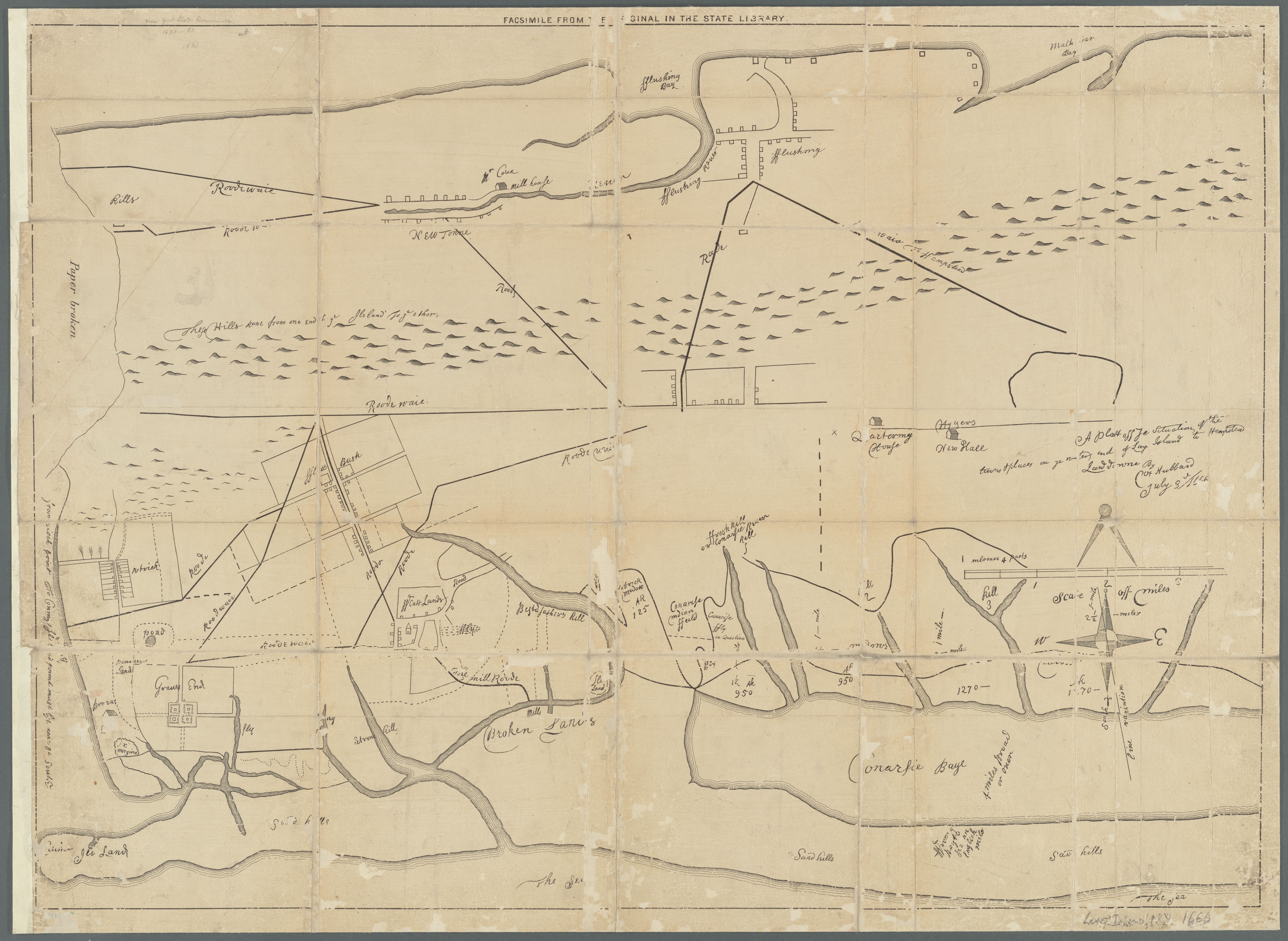
Western Long Island and Coney Island in 1666, two years after van Salee sold his property to Francis de Bruyn or Brown.

The remains of some of his farm buildings were thought to have been uncovered in 1879. Van Salee's 1643 deed to land in Coney Island was acquired by the Brooklyn Historical Society at auction in 2019.

A map from 1655 depicting a van Salee property on Bridge Street in New Amsterdam

An illustration from 1652 depicting a van Salee property

He was the first grantee of land on Conyne Eylandt (Coney Island). Van Salee helped found Long Island settlements including New Utrecht and Gravesend. In 1660 he founded Boswijck (now known as Bushwick), along with twenty-three other settlers, including free blacks Francisco and Anton. In 1661, a grant for Gysberts Island was denied.

== Return to New Amsterdam ==
In 1643, van Salee purchased a house on Bridge Street in New Amsterdam, in defiance of the court order excluding him from that settlement. It was known as a tall house. He also purchased another property on the Heere Gracht at Hoogh Street. He became a successful merchant and creditor in New Amsterdam, while owning several properties throughout the region. By this time he was considered a mini patroon. He had his own boat to traverse between his properties. His personal attorney was William Jansen van Borckelo. In 1656, he transferred a portion of his property on Manhattan Island to Isaac Kip, son of Hendrick Hendricksen Kip, witnessed by Schepen Jacob Stryker.

In 1669, he left his Long Island properties to his son-in-law Ferdinandus van Sycklin and turned his Bridge Street property into an inn after Grietse died. While his property portfolio was no longer extensive in 1674, he was listed in the "1,000". That year he was fined for quartering an Englishman named Edward Brambi during the Third Anglo-Dutch War.

== Identity and social history ==
Van Salee's ethnic and religious background were highly unusual for a prominent colonial landholder and have led to discussions about his place in social history. It is uncertain how much these identity issues drove Van Salee's social and legal conflicts.

=== Faith ===
A Quran said to have belonged to van Salee was sold in the ca. 1886 estate sale of Joachim Rule, among other heirlooms of the Van Siclen and Gulick families, as documented by descendant Robert Bayles of the Market and Fulton National Bank of New York. Qurans were not printed or sold in New Amsterdam, and during this period were typically reserved to more wealthier individuals. Anthony's Quran was in the Arabic language and considered old.

Van Salee petitioned to have Christian missionaries assigned to new settlements. Once he was fined for housing an English Quaker at his home on Bridge Street, as they were excluded as Dissenters from the English colony; the man was there to repair a Dutch church.

Van Salee appeared to be on good terms with his neighbor Lady Deborah Moody, the founder of Gravesend. John Edwin Stillwell wrote that van Salee had disputes with her husband Sir Henry Moody, but he had died in England. Lady Moody was a widow by 1629, a decade before she left England for the Massachusetts Bay Colony, where she lived before settling in New Netherland.

The Iconography of Manhattan Island writes of van Salee: "A Hollander, whose father, possibly in the course of commercial ventures to the Barbary states, is said to have embraced the tenets of Islam, he was also frequently alluded to as Anthony the Turk."

=== Ethnicity and appearance ===
Van Salee was described as unusually tall, with superior strength. He was known as "a 'Turk'" or "semi-Dutchman from Algiers", some say from Morocco; Berber, of "tawny" complexion. He was credited with the "first dwelling erected by Europeans" in what became New Utrecht, about 1643. In court records, van Salee was noted as "Turk", suggesting that record keepers classified him by appearance or culture.

Anthony's brother, Abraham Janszoon van Salee, a fellow New Netherland settler who was involved in privateering, was described as a "mulatto", in recognition of his mixed-race ancestry, and married a black woman named Fortuyn.

== Marriage, family and descendants ==
Van Salee had married Grietse Reyniers in 1629 in Amsterdam. She was born in Wesel, Germany, and would become known as New York's "First Lady of the Night." The 1996 historical fiction novel by Michael Pye called the "The Drowning Room" is based on her. She was married previously to Aelbert Egberts, from Haarlem, a tailor.

Anthony and Grietse had four daughters together. They married into respectable colonial commercial families:

- Eva Antonis, married Ferdinandus van Sycklin, an early immigrant to New Netherland and the namesake for Van Siclen Avenue in Brooklyn. She is an ancestor of Robert Bayles, the last descendant to own Van Salee's Qur'an. According to Van Dyck Roberts, she was baptized.
- Cornelia, who married William Johnson
- Annica, married Thomas Southard. Their daughter Abigail was the great-great-grandmother of Cornelius Vanderbilt
- Sara, married John Emans.

Van Salee's first wife Grietse died in 1669. The widower van Salee married Metje Grevenraet, an ethnic Dutch woman. He passed his final years at his home on Bridge Street, dying in 1676. Metje was a Quaker who helped van Salee tolerate the church.

Van Salee apparently also had a brother living in the colony, Abraham Janszoon van Salee, who was part-owner of the privateer La Garce. Abraham's descendants included several noted African American figures, including John van Salee de Grasse.

Van Salee's notable descendants include Warren G. Harding, Samuel L. Southard, the Vanderbilts in the United States and Europe, the Whitneys, and the Frelinghuysens. In the 1960s, the New York Genealogical and Historical Society claimed Jacqueline Bouvier Kennedy Onassis was a descendant of Anthony, in which she responded she knew of the ancestry. However, in 2022, Christopher Childs, an editor from the New England Historic Genealogical Society and WikiTree member, cast doubt on the descent.
