= John Jay McKelvey Sr. =

American lawyer (1863–1947)

John Jay McKelvey
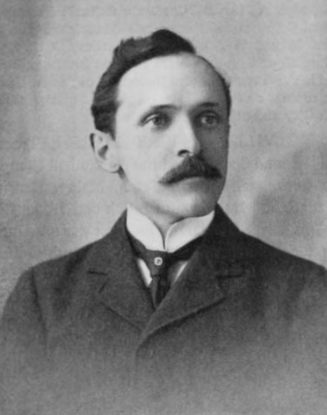
- Born: May 24, 1863; Sandusky, Ohio, US
- Died: October 19, 1947 (aged 84); Mount Kisco, New York, US
- Education: Oberlin College; Harvard University
- Occupations: Attorney, preservationist
- Known for: Founded the Harvard Law Review
- Notable work: Principles of Common Law Pleading, Handbook of the Law of Evidence

John Jay McKelvey (May 24, 1863 – October 19, 1947) was an American author, attorney, and preservationist who set precedents in establishing the Harvard Law Review and in framing case law to craft the environs of his Spuyten Duyvil community, New York.

== Life ==
John Jay (J. J.) McKelvey was born Sunday, May 24, 1863, in Sandusky, Ohio, to John McKelvey and Jane Rowland Huntington McKelvey. J. J.'s paternal grandparents were Matthew McKelvey and Nancy Adams McKelvey, and his paternal great-grandparents were William McKelvey and Mary Toppings McKelvey along with Bildad Adams and Mary Hines Adams. William McKelvey of Scotch-Irish American, Revolutionary War regality removed with an assembly after the war to the Western Reserve; where John McKelvey fashioned and financed Sandusky and a section of its first short line railroad, which was eventually enveloped by the Pennsylvania Railroad. Whereas, J. J.'s maternal grandparents were Apollos Huntington and Deborah Rowland Huntington with his maternal great-grandparents being American Revolutionary War soldier Elisha Huntington and Esther Ladd Huntington and great-grandparents of the William Rowland lineage. J. J.'s five siblings included: Janet Huntington McKelvey Swift, Alice Rowland McKelvey Milne, Jennie Adams McKelvey, Charles Sumner McKelvey, and Ralph Huntington McKelvey. J. J.'s sister Alice and father John helped document their family's English and Welsh pedigree, colonial ancestors, war-time service, and Fire Lands migration.

After successfully completing his college course, McKelvey initially married Mary Clark Mattocks on July 12, 1887 in Cleveland, Ohio, at the bride's childhood home. Before settling into their described "Bonnie Brae" on the Hudson River at Spuyten Duyvil, he and Mary visited her mother in Los Angeles, California to consolidate contiguous land for the completion of their estate on Palisade Avenue, New York City. In J. J.'s household, he afforded Irish servants, and he and Mary had four girls: Mary Alice McKelvey, Constance McKelvey, Ruth McKelvey, and Jane McKelvey. Primarily J. J. lived and practiced law in New York City; though, he occasionally traveled for business or an excursion to Oberlin, Bermuda, or to Ricker's Hill-Top in Poland Spring, Maine. Midlife, McKelvey and Mary divorced; after which, he married Louise E. Brunning, June 10, 1914, and fathered three children: Louise McKelvey, John Jay McKelvey Jr., and Robert Adams McKelvey. After 1940, John Jay McKelvey was thought to have returned to his Lake Erie, Cleveland, Ohio roots; however, he died Sunday, October 19, 1947 after a short illness in Northern Westchester Hospital, Mount Kisco, New York. His family held his service at the previously popular Universal Funeral Chapel, Lexington Avenue and 52nd Street, New York City, Wednesday, October 22 at 8:00 p.m.

== Education ==
McKelvey graduated from Sandusky High School, Ohio, with first honors during June 1880 and entered Oberlin College during September 1880, where he completed his undergraduate classical studies, June 1884, earning an A.B. degree. Oberlin's writing guild and its oratory society, wherein he excelled, helped prepare him for ten hour days of studying law, moot court, and the Socratic Method at Harvard, where he began during the autumn of 1884. By June 1887 he had graduated from Harvard with an A.M. degree from the College Department and a L.L.B. degree from the Law Department and cum laude credentials.

With further distinction, McKelvey founded the Harvard Law Review and served as its first editor-in-chief, during 1887. To take the law review from idea to print, Chief McKelvey convinced law society mates to join his mission, and his intimate nucleus gaged the backing of Harvard professors and solicited subscription support from alumni. With proper organization and logistics, the review went to press, and Chief McKelvey bolstered the Harvard Law Review success, by lobbying his circle of influence, including the Oberlin contingency and Harvard alumni of Boston and New York City. Salesman, spokesman, organizer, chief, McKelvey essentially encouraged other law-truth-seekers to buy into the value of establishing the Harvard Law Review.

== Attorney-at-law ==
Admitted to the New York bar during 1888, initially McKelvey began to practice law at 10 Wall Street in New York City, with Albert Stickney, Esquire and Edward Morse Shepard, Esquire of Stickney & Shepard, at the top of his bar history; after which, during 1889 McKelvey associated with DeLancey Nicoll. From 1890 to 1894, McKelvey worked as a solo practitioner at 45 William Street—the same office complex shared by then Grover Cleveland. Between 1894 and 1895, McKelvey joined the law firm of Shepard, Terry, McKelvey, & Prentiss—a short-lived partnership, though fellow Harvard Law alumni Seth Sprague Terry would subsequently serve McKelvey as his counsel. McKelvey returned to practicing law alone, between 1895 and 1899. With his brother-in-law Frederick W. Mattocks, McKelvey formed his second longest partnership, primarily practicing realty law from 1899 to 1906 at 66 Broadway. McKelvey longest law partnership was between 1906 and 1914 with the firm of McKelvey & Favour at 84 William Street where Alpheus Hoyt Favour and associates drew denunciations and dismissals. By 1919, McKelvey was displaying his own shingle, practicing law at 43 Cedar Street.McKelvey held his last partnership with McKelvey & Kennedy from 1926 to 1930 before finishing his solo law career, with an office at 36th West 44th Street and pleadings before the New York Supreme Court on behalf of his affluent clients.

== Legal clients ==
Holding about a dozen board memberships and principalship positions, McKelvey counseled officers of various business entities, involving insurance underwriting, lumber, finance, politics, preservation, railroad, and voluminous realty issues. His work as advocate and attorney presented opportunity to appear and champion his clients and their causes at several levels from local assessors' boards to the New York State Senate and New York Supreme Court to U.S. legislative hearings, and ultimately via U.S. Supreme Court pleadings.

Representing the Sandusky & Columbus Short Line Railway Company, McKelvey served as counsel and helped consolidate the railroad his father began. Years later, he returned to the railway transit business, with the New York & Chicago Short Line, but his involvement with the Pan-American Transcontinental Railway Company could have unhinged an elite career. Early to mid-career McKelvey began defending the risks and rights of lumber and insurance entities, and a New York City newspaper commentary listed McKelvey among a list of approximately 200 attorneys eligible and worthy to sit on the U.S. Supreme Court bench. McKelvey'sadvocacy and appearance work augmented his travel and influence from Canada to California to the Roosevelt White House, 1904 and kept his name in wide-ranging newspapers and respected industry periodicals, as an authority, appearing alongside the names of entities such as these:

- East Side Lumber Company
- Lumbers Exporters' Association
- Lumber Insurance Company of New York
- Lumber Insurers General Agency
- National Wholesale Lumber Dealers' Association of America
- Adirondack Fire Insurance Company
- Toledo Fire and Marine Insurance Company of New York
- Federal Union Fire Insurance Company

Through the Park District Protective League, attorney McKelvey represented the realty rights and interests of wealthy landowners who lived along the Hudson River at Spuyten Duyvil. He defended the residents against adverse possession, easements, eminent domain, unfair property assessments, etc. With denials, fees, and decisions against the residents and their reserve, McKelvey switched tactics. He moved from a protective mode to a preservationist mind frame. McKelvey formed or managed companies, which he used to finesse the purchases of the Spuyten Duyvil estates from amiable residents and subsequently used the companies to control these multi-faceted realty transactions and help control urban growth. McKelvey's strategy converted manor homes and grounds into multi-unit cottages, mostly upscale co-operatives, apartments, or studio homes. McKelvey fashioned the residences after the character of the estate environs but named the abodes after French and British heroines Rosa Bonheur and Charlotte Brontë, with names such as the Villa Victoria, the Villa Rosa Bonheur, and the Villa Charlotte Brontë. McKelvey primarily pushed his lasting strategy through the below five named collectives:

- Along-the-Hudson Company
- Edgehill Co-operative Savings and Loan Association
- Edgehill Terraces Company
- Industrial and Commercial Exhibition Company of New York
- Northern Realty Company

The landscape continued to change for the park residence district with the onslaught of WWI through the Great Depression, which amplified the pressure from urban developers, commissioners, and unabated assessors. Along the pathway to resolving the grotesque vs. picturesque community character crisis, other creative landowners adopted McKelvey's strategy or a similar stance.

== Legal cases ==
In 1902 Nelson Bill took McKelvey's brand of advocacy to a U.S. Senate committee hearing, the land under water rights issue took McKelvey pleadings to the U.S. Supreme Court, 1934. McKelvey voluminous case load encompassed commercial contracts, real property and corporation law. However, his more noted (important) legal cases and/or counsel appearances were found with litigation that reached the New York Supreme Court.

== Legal text ==
Though not technically a treatise like Wigmore's, McKelvey's key legal writings, especially his two most popular texts have been revised and re-released at several intervals:

- Principles of Common Law Pleading
- Handbook of the Law of Evidence

Like his books, McKelvey's journal article "The Law School Review, 1887 – 1937", which originally appeared in the Harvard Law Review, is available at libraries, in full text via on-line databases. In 1917, McKelvey explained in retrospect, the Columbia Jurist was his inspiration for establishing a law review at Harvard. McKelvey's April 1937 written assessment touched on the influence of the law review model and explained the founding purpose of the Harvard Law Review. Metaphorically, McKelvey described the law school review as a pebble innocently tossed upon immeasurable water, with an effect beyond the initial pulsating ripple, unclear. However, the organic quest for truth always yields fruit; thereby worthy of human effort toward fairness and justice, and as long as the law school review holds fast to honestly, genuinely, and thoughtfully pursuing truth, its purpose will be justified and fruitful and its existence sustained.

== Legacy ==
As early as 1901, concerned citizens began complaining about intruding patients from a nearby infirmary, meandering through their quaint neighborhoods, onto their verandas and lawns, loitering, and spitting phlegm. The complainants asserted that intruders were contaminating their vicinity and violating the local health department's "no spit rule," as well should be relocated along with the infirmary. Publicly spitting phlegm in the Spuyten Duyvil community that derived its name from a Dutch phrase meaning spitting devil or the devil's spit ironically juxtaposed the gesture vs. symbolism. For decades the Spuyten Duyvil, Riverdale, Kingsbridge, and Hudson Park communities symbolized tranquil, picturesque manors, isolated for the influential, the industrialist, the informed who resented gestures of urban encroachment toward their enclaves of estate living.

From the turn of the century forward, residents like McKelvey crusaded with litigation and legislation against blight, destroying their park residence district; however, as stalwarts of the various neighborhood protection leagues died, capitulated, compromised, or continued with vigor, McKelvey eventually countered, supplanting the platted grid of urban development and certain infrastructure, with his own brand of expansion. McKelvey used realty buyouts to help defend and save his picturesque tranquility and launch his visionary Villa Charlotte Brontë (Villa Brontë), 1926. Critics carped McKelvey's myopic vision considered more his profit and seemingly was oblivious to the parallel plight of the nearby consumptives and the sanatorium.

Perhaps as McKelvey intended, Villa Brontë stands perched as a witness with dual vision—an eye toward the future unknown and an eye regarding preservation. By strategically using realty law, commercial contracts, and corporation law, McKelvey created beautiful living, benefiting ensuing generations. Through McKelvey's further legal engagement, he instrumentally developed Henry Hudson Monument, along the Hudson Park and Edgehill Terraces as part of the Spuyten Duyvil or Riverdale District.

=== Legacy in Spuyten Duyvil ===
On April 23, 2020, two resolutions were affirmed by Bronx Community Board 8 to co-name the intersections of Bradley Terrace and Palisade Avenue in honor of McKelvey at Palisade Avenue between Independence and Edsall Avenues after the former Villa Rosa Bonheur.

Initially the co-naming resolutions were rejected by the then Council Member Andrew Cohen, but were later advanced by Council Member Eric Dinowitz to the NYC Council. On December 15, 2021, the Council voted in favor of a combined co-naming of the intersection of Palisade Avenue and Independence Avenue, at Bradley Terrace as "Palisade Avenue / John J. McKelvey Sr. Villa Rosa Bonheur Way".

On April 8, 2022, the street co-naming was unveiled in a public ceremony, hosted by Council Member Dinowitz, successfully ending the three year effort by community activist Stephanie Coggins for the historic acknowledgment of the contributions of McKelvey in Spuyten Duyvil and for preservation of the legacy of architectural gemstone Villa Rosa Bonheur, after its untimely and controversial demolition by a developer to build an apartment building. This demolition was in spite of the pronounced and extended outcry of the community.

== Community involvement and membership ==
Mr. McKelvey practiced community building, finding clients, membership, and participation in numerous organizations, including those listed below:

=== Academia ===
- Oberlin College, Trustee Nominee
- Barnard School for Boys, Inc., Trustee

=== Arts ===
- American Museum of Natural History
- Metropolitan Museum of Art

=== Civic ===
- Hudson–Fulton Celebration Commission (Bronx, Contracts Committee)
- Henry Hudson Monument Association (Secretary, Fundraiser)
- Park District Protective League (Trustee)

=== Legal ===
- American Bar Association
- New York State Bar Association
- New York City Bar Association
- Harvard Law Association

=== Social ===
- Ardsley City (now Country) Club
- City Reform Club, New York City
- Harvard Club of New York City
- New York Oberlin Alumni Association

=== Other ===
- Edgehill Church, Founder, Incorporator, Trustee, Spuyten Duyvil
- Oberlin College Library (Book Collection & Monetary Donations)

== Politics and religion ==
In print and in person McKelvey may have been described as an independent Democrat and Protestant who in theory politically backed free silver opponents but walked in practice with the capitalists and industrialists of his day, such as the Hearsts and Rockefellers.
