= Anthony Van Corlaer =

Fictional New Amsterdam trumpeter

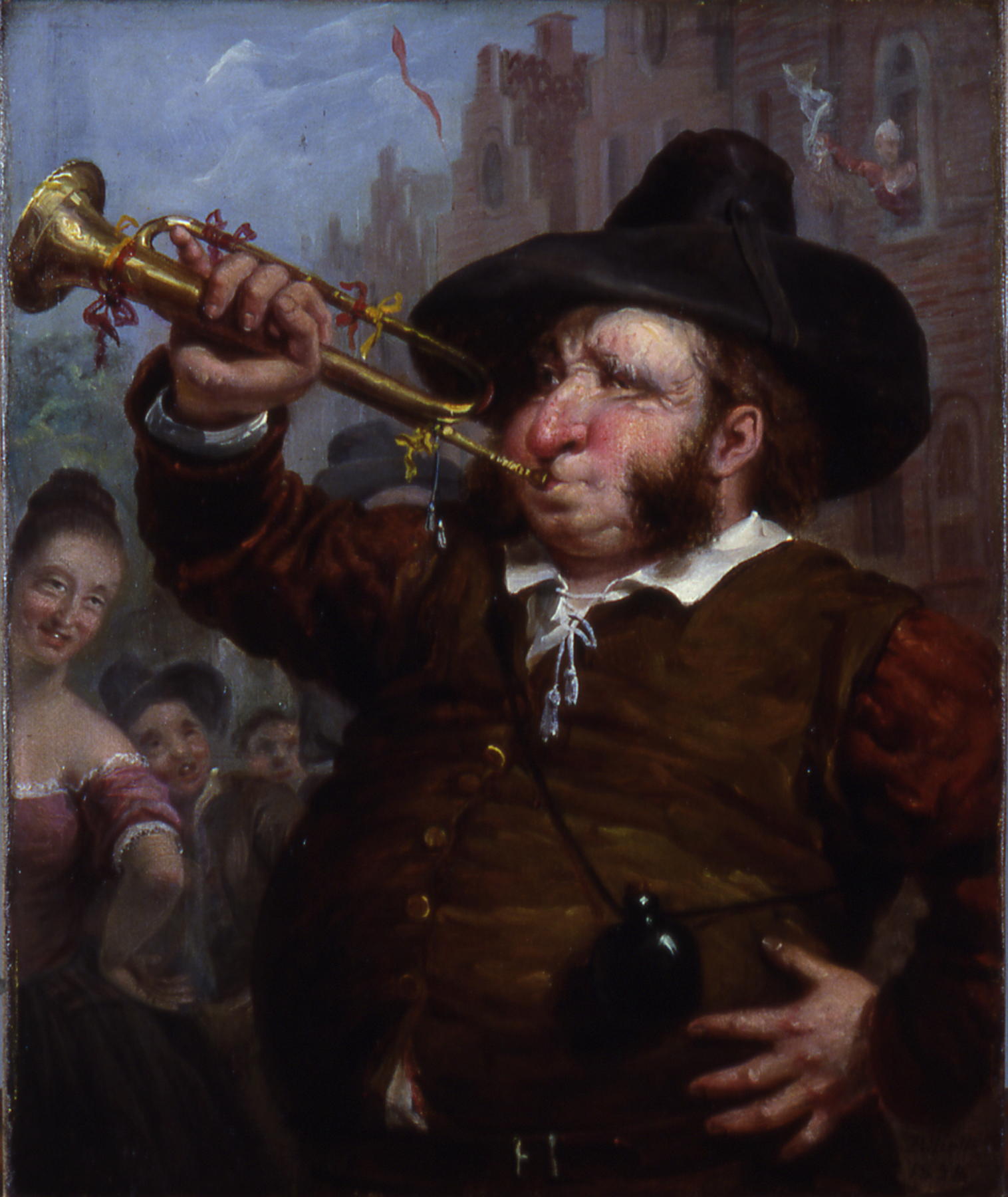
Anthony Van Corlaer, 1858. Painting by Charles Loring Elliott. The Walters Art Museum.

Anthony Van Corlaer is a fictional trumpeter of New Amsterdam, appearing in Washington Irving's 1809 A History of New York, as well as derivative lore.

The trumpeter is portrayed as a loyal follower to the real historical Peter Stuyvesant, with a contrasting boisterous temperament to the stern colonial governor. In a mock-heroic concluding episode, the character curses (and so gives a name to) Spuyten Duyvil Creek before diving in to cross it, then drowns while giving a final triumphant blast of warning about the English invasion.

The character and incident were sometimes later described as fact or "legend", but Washington seems to have only drawn from an account by David Pietersz. de Vries of an unnamed boisterous and pugilistic trumpeter in the colony.

== Factual basis ==
Although the Spuyten Duyvil Creek episode is sometimes repeated as fact or "legend", the character of Anthony Van Corlaer is a fictional one, and there is no historical record of such an occurrence preceding the novel's publication.

The factual basis of the character was an account by David Pietersz. de Vries of an unnamed boisterous and pugilistic trumpeter who interrupted the banquet dinner celebrating his August 1636 departure from Fort Amsterdam, physically fighting with both Andries Hudde and Jacobus van Corlaer when they protested his playing.

There was a "Manuel Trumpeter" in the colony about this time, who later owned property in the Land of the Blacks; any connection is unknown. The story may also have been inspired by the drowning of Arent van Corlaer. The character's first name was taken from Anthony's Nose Mountain.

== In Washington Irving ==
In Irving's story, Peter Stuyvesant, having learned of an English expedition on its way to seize the colony, ordered Van Corlaer to rouse the villages along the Hudson River with a trumpet call to war. "It was a dark and stormy night" when Van Corlaer arrived at the upper end of the island, and as no ferryman was available Van Corlaer vowed to swim across the Harlem River "in spite of the devil", but drowned in the attempt. Before at last going under, he blows a last heroic blast like the chivalric Orlando. Some sources state that Spuyten Duyvil, an inlet between Manhattan and the Bronx, is named after this incident.

Van Corlaer was famous for his enormous, shiny red nose. One story tells of a sturgeon killed by a ray of sunlight reflected off its surface. Anthony's Nose Mountain along the Hudson is said by Irving to be named for this event.

Van Corlaer's prior endeavors on behalf of Stuyvesant are mentioned several times in Washington Irving's book A History of New York. Irving also wrote the most popular account of the trumpeter's last deed, including the witness statement (which he claims to disbelieve) of Van Corlaer being seized by "the duyvel, in the shape of a huge mossbonker". This has led some modern readers, unaware that Irving's work was a parody of history, to suggest that Van Corlaer was killed by a bull shark.

== In popular culture ==
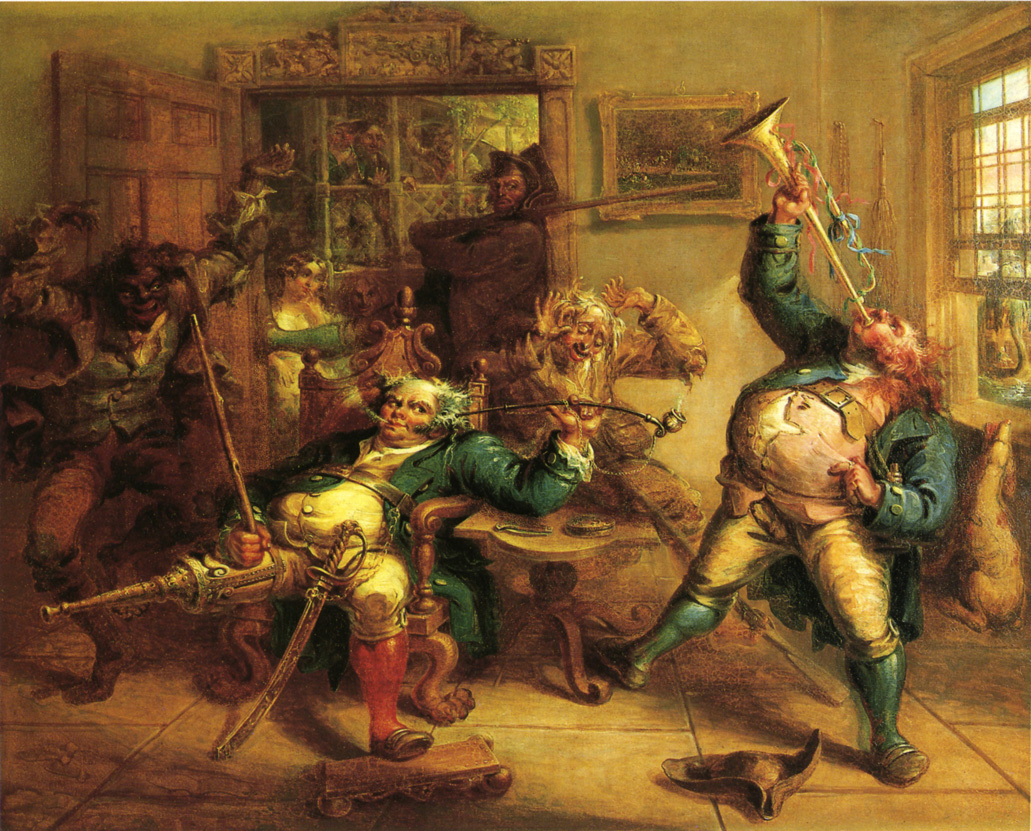
Antony Van Corlear Brought Into the Presence of Peter Stuyvesant, 1839, John Quidor.

The 1838 painting Dance on the Battery in the Presence of Peter Stuyvesant by Asher B. Durand depicts Van Corlaer with his trumpet.

In 1893 Howard Pyle painted a picture of Anthony Van Corlaer to serve as the basis for a stained glass window commissioned by the Colonial Club of New York from Tiffany Glass and Decorating Company. The window was removed at some point and on March 30, 1984, was auctioned by Christie's in New York and purchased by the Delaware Art Museum.

Kamala Sankaram wrote a musical composition in 2016, "The Last Blast of Anthony the Trumpeter".
