= Barnard School for Boys =

Information
- Type: College prep-school
- Established: 1886
- Founder: William Livingston Hazen
- Yearbook: Bric

The Barnard School for Boys was a college prep-school founded in 1886 by William Livingston Hazen and named in honor of the then-president of Columbia University Frederick A. P. Barnard.

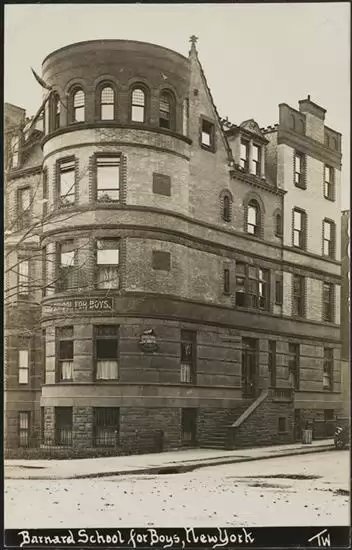
Barnard School for Boys, New York. Founded 1886. Moved to this building at 721 St. Nicholas Avenue (corner of 146th Street & St. Nicholas Avenue) about 1899. Photographed ca. 1909 by Thaddeus Wilkerson.

In 1920, Barnard moved to 246th Street and Cayuga Avenue in the Riverdale section of the Bronx of New York City, in the private, upper-class neighborhood of Fieldston, where grades 1 to 12 were in the main building, while the kindergarten was in a separate, smaller building called the Cottage School.

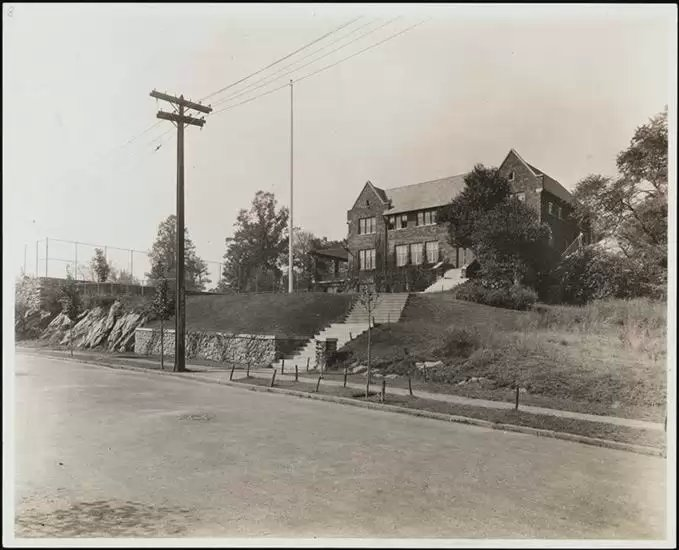
Barnard School for Boys building located at 246th Street and Cayuga Avenue in the Fieldston section of the Riverdale neighborhood, Bronx, NY.

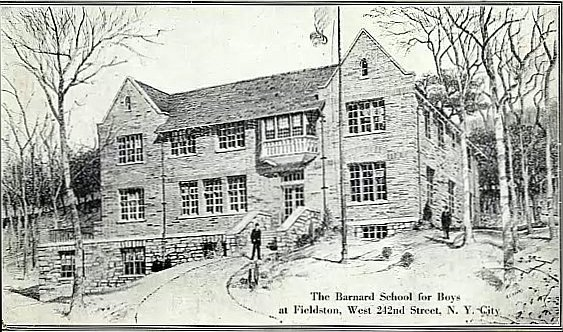
Barnard School for Boys

It merged with the Horace Mann School in 1972, which first opened its doors in a small building on University Place in Greenwich Village in 1887. Both had previously moved to Riverdale (Horace Mann, 1914 Barnard, 1920) and were situated as neighbors separated by a dell and a wide tree lined street.

Unlike most Prep Schools which started at the 7th or 9th grades, Barnard was Kindergarten-12.

Barnard was an unusual combination of a formal, classical English-style curriculum, with the ambiance, interaction, and demeanor of progressive education. It was also unusual in that by the 1950s the religious composition of the school was about one-third each of Protestant, Catholic and Jewish. Barnard was a small school with only 25-40 students in each grade. Individual instructors typically had only 10-15 students in each classroom.

There were no elective classes other than the choice of a second language. Latin, the first language, was compulsory for all students starting in the 7th grade, which was very unusual for the 1950s. Students could elect Spanish or French as their second language. Four years of mathematics were compulsory as was Chemistry and Physics. By the 1960s Latin was no longer compulsory and students had the option of taking Chemistry, Physics or Biology.

Progressive education principles governed the curriculum of the school following the educational philosophy of Carrington Raymond, a long time Headmaster of the school. There were no school uniforms which were so typical of prep schools in that era. The boys did not even have to wear dress shirts and ties, other than on Fridays for assemblies, then a controversial relaxing of the traditional demeanor of prep school students. Student first names were used by other students and often even teachers instead of the more formal "Mr." which was then almost universal. By the 1960s students were required to wear dress shirts, ties, and jackets every day. Teachers were almost always addressed as "sir" or "madame."

The school newspaper was the Purple B. The yearbook was the Barnard Bric.

== 1967 Teachers Strike ==
During the first trimester of 1967 a group of Barnard School's core teaching staff—organized by a recent hire from the New York City Public school system—declared a strike. The teachers set up a picket line outside the school entrance refusing to teach their classes. And although they were unaffiliated with a larger teachers' union, sought economic parity with New York City Public School educators whose salaries were at that time, higher.

The Barnard School administration was caught totally unprepared, labeling this action an illegal strike it sought to marshal what remaining teaching resources were available to prevent a complete shut-down of the institution. The response was doomed from its inception and the school failed its students miserably. Instead of delivering the first class academic experience to which the student body was accustomed, chaos and at best mediocre substitute teachers taught a "makeshift curriculum." For instance, physical education teachers taught 10th grade biology, the headmaster (head of school) himself taught history classes, and even the Headmaster Emeritus, Carrington Raymond, who at the time was well into his retirement, was mobilized to instruct algebra, geometry, and calculus classes. The student body became confused, frustrated, and disappointed with the way the strike was handled while the core of the striking teachers became more committed to their cause as they watched the power and prestige of the institution literally disintegrate before their eyes.

Students, who were generally sympathetic to their teachers refused to cross the picket line were required to enter the school through a rear entrance or face disciplinary action. The strike eventually ended when the administration "settled" with individual instructors, allowing the better ones to return while dismissing the "instigators." The Strike of 1967 left deep scars on the Barnard School for Boys as an institution as well as on its students, especially those in the higher grades who were short changed on the quality of their education as they prepared more immediately for college admission.

The Barnard School for Boys never quite recovered its momentum or reputation in the wake of the teachers strike. The Classes of '69 and '70 for instance, saw far fewer students receiving acceptances at Ivy League colleges. By the time Barnard merged with Horace Mann in 1972, it was struggling financially and for its own survival. The "merger" was in effect, a real estate transaction in which a covenant to keep the prestigious institution alive as "The Horace Mann-Barnard School" and carry its name forward would last as long as New York's statute allowing a restrictive covenant would permit.

And so with the death of Barnard's last Headmaster, Gordon I. Newcombe, exactly twenty-one years to the day later, the name "Horace Mann-Barnard" reverted to Horace Mann. The Barnard School for Boys was relegated to history, the covenant that once ran with the very valuable land it occupied and physical plant that once housed the vision of the alma mater of Mr. Hazen and Mr. Raymond had lapsed. Horace Mann now has possession of all school records as well as the legal rights to the legacy of what once was The Barnard School for Boys.

== See also ==
- John Jay McKelvey, Sr., Attorney, Founder of Harvard Law Review, Barnard School for Boys, Inc., Trustee.
