= Sack of Lanzarote (1618) =

1618 Algerian incursion

Date	1 May 1618
Location	Lanzarote, Spain
Result	Algerian victory

Belligerents
Regency of Algiers	Spanish Empire

Commanders and leaders
(Regency of Algiers) Tabac Arráez	(Spanish Empire) Jan Janszoon (POW)

Strength
36 galleys 3,000 or 5,000 men	Unknown

Casualties and losses
Unknown	Before naval battle: 900 captured After naval battle: 700 captured

The Sack of Lanzarote occurred in 1618, when 36 Algerian galleys sacked the island of Lanzarote in the Canary Islands, taking 900 men, women and children with them to be sold.

== Sack ==
On May 1, 1618, 36 Algerian galleys arrived at Arrecife, Lanzarote, aiming to raid and plunder anything valuable. Led by Tabac Arraez, the pirate commander, a force of 3,000 or 5,000 men looted the island, leaving the inhabitants to seek refuge in caves. Eventually, they were besieged and captured by the Regency of Algiers, totaling 900 men, women, and children. On that day, Jan Janszoon, a Dutch soldier, was also captured. He later converted to Islam and became known as Murat Reis the Younger.

== Aftermath ==
Upon learning of the event, King Philip III of Spain ordered the Spanish navy to intercept the pirates, successfully rescuing around 200 captives. The remaining 700 were sold in Tunis and Algiers.
