= Henry Hudson Park =

Public park in the Bronx, New York

Coordinates: 40°52′51″N 73°55′11″W

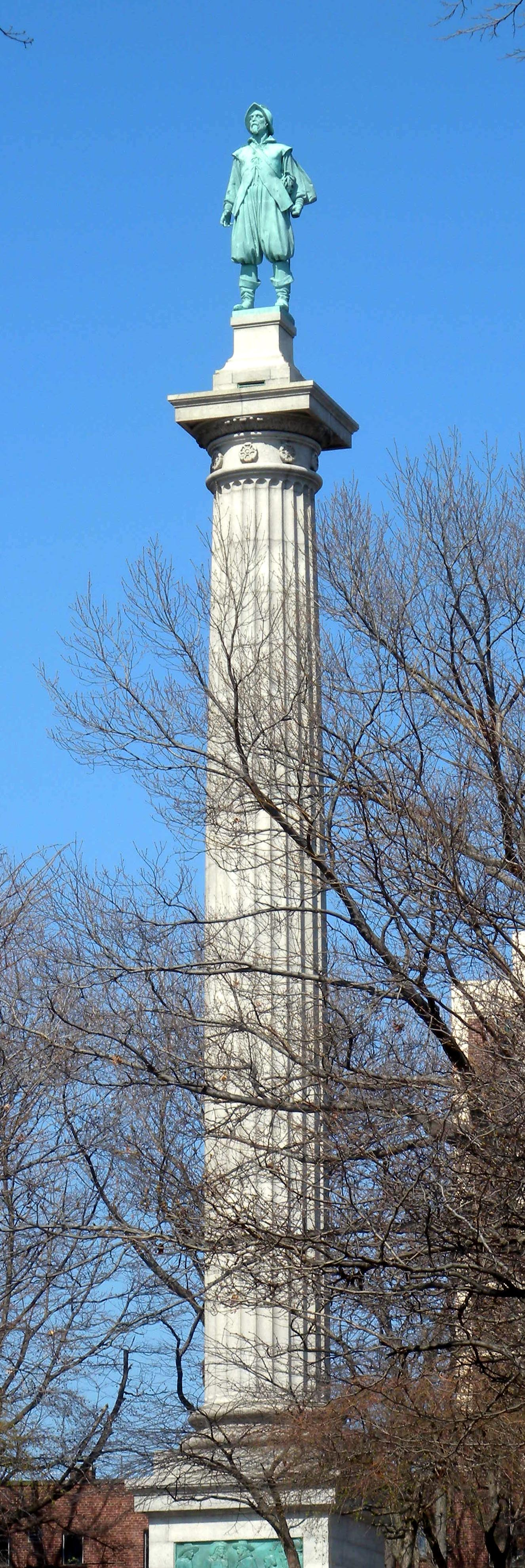
- Interactive map of Henry Hudson Park
- Type: Urban park
- Location: Spuyten Duyvil, Bronx, New York City
- Created: 1938
- Operator: New York City Department of Parks and Recreation

Henry Hudson Memorial Park is a small public park in the Spuyten Duyvil neighborhood of The Bronx in New York City, located at the intersection of Kappock Street and Independence Avenue. It is the site of the Henry Hudson Monument or Henry Hudson Memorial, dedicated in 1938. The park is part of the New York City Department of Parks and Recreation.

== Description and history ==
The park is named after famed English explorer Henry Hudson, who is also the namesake of the nearby Hudson River, Henry Hudson Parkway and Henry Hudson Bridge. In 1906 the Hudson-Fulton Celebration was organized to celebrate the 300th anniversary of Hudson's arrival in what later became Lower New York Bay and the 100th anniversary of Robert Fulton's North River Steamboat's initial voyage. The celebration was held from September 25 to October 9 in New York and New Jersey.

A monument to Hudson to Hudson was planned in Spuyten Duyvil, Bronx; a site was donated to the city and local businesses raised funds for work to begin in 1909. The project encountered multiple delays, but in 1912 a 100-foot (30 m) Doric column, designed by Walter Cook of Babb, Cook & Welch, was set in place t the park's highest elevation. Shortly after, funds for the project, which had been raised by subscription, ran out. Additionally the sculptor chosen to create the "Heroic statue of Henry Hudson" to stand atop the column, Karl Bitter, died in 1915, having completed only a partial plaster model of his planned "Heroic statue of Henry Hudson". The project stalled.

It was revived by New York City Parks Commissioner Robert Moses in the late 1930s under the auspices of the Henry Hudson Parkway Authority, and by 1938, the area around the monument had been designated as a park and a 16-foot (4.9 m) bronze statue of Henry Hudson, redesigned and completed by Karl Gruppe – a student of Bitter – from Bitter's plaster model, had been placed atop the column. At the column's base were two bas-relief panels. The south panel shows Hudson receiving his commission from the Dutch East India Company, and the north one shows Native Americans and Europeans together at the first Dutch trading post on Manhattan Island. The monument was dedicated on January 6, 1938.

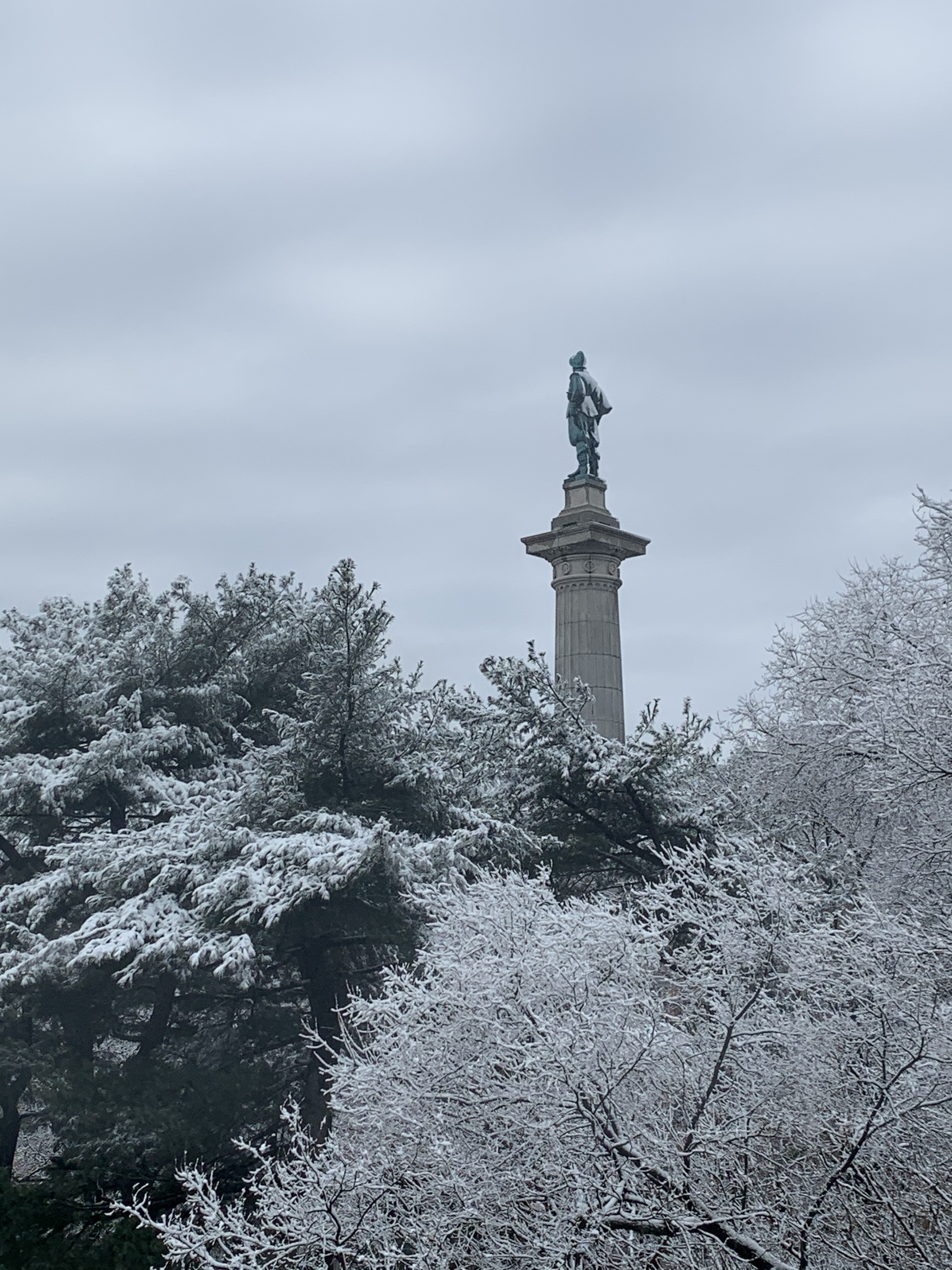
The statue of Henry Hudson in Henry Hudson Memorial Park in Spuyten Duyvil

In the southern side of the park, across Kappock Street, are located basketball courts, a baseball diamond, handball courts, and Paul's Playground (see below). Another playground is located in the northeast corner of the park.

At the southwest end of the park across Palisade Avenue and not directly connected with the rest of the park, is a small overlook with views of the Hudson and Harlem Rivers (the latter of which was formerly Spuyten Duyvil Creek) and the Hudson River Palisades. The overlook is named "Half Moon Overlook" after Hudson's ship, the Half Moon.

=== Renovations and "Paul's Playground" ===
The park underwent major renovations in 1989 and 1995, mainly due to the efforts of local community activist Paul Cymerman. For his dedication and volunteerism, a small playground area of the park was renamed Paul's Playground in 2003, the only New York City playground to be named for a living person. After his death in 2004, the local community continued his efforts to keep the park safe and clean. Additional capital projects were completed by 2019.
