= Jan Janszoon =

Dutch pirate (1570–c. 1641)

Grand Admiral of Salé
- In office 1619–1627

Governor of Salé (ceremonial)
- In office 1623–1627
- Appointed by: Sultan Zidan Abu Maali

Governor of Oualidia
- In office 1640–1641
- Appointed by: Sultan Mohammed esh Sheikh es Seghir

Personal details
- Born: Jan Janszoon van Salee / Van Haarlem c. 1570 Haarlem, County of Holland
- Died: 1641 or later
- Children: Lysbeth Jansz, Maria Jansz, Tryn Jansz, Anthony Janszoon van Salee, Abraham Janszoon van Salee.
- Occupation: Admiral

Military service
- Allegiance: Regency of Algiers, Republic of Salé, Alawi dynasty
- Rank: Commodore (Reis)
- Battles/wars: Sack of Lanzarote (1618); Mount's Bay (1625); Turkish Abductions (1627); Lundy (1627); Slave raid of Suðuroy (1629); Sack of Baltimore (1631)

Jan Janszoon van Haarlem, commonly known as Reis Mourad the Younger (c. 1570 – c. 1641), was a Dutch pirate who later became a Barbary corsair in the Regency of Algiers and the Republic of Salé. After being captured by Algerian corsairs off Lanzarote in 1618, he converted to Islam and changed his name to Mourad. He became one of the most famous of the 17th-century Barbary corsairs. Together with other corsairs, he helped establish the independent Republic of Salé at the city of that name, serving as the first President and Commander. He also served as Governor of Oualidia.

== Early life ==
Jan Janszoon van Haerlem was born in Haarlem in 1570, in Holland, then a province ruled by the Habsburg monarchy. The Eighty Years War between Dutch rebels and the Spanish Empire under King Philip II had started seven years before his birth; it lasted all his life. Little is known about his early life. He married Soutgen Gave on 19 January 1603 in Haarlem and had three daughters with her, Lysbeth Jans (born 7 December 1608, Haarlem), Trijn Jans (born 14 July 1610, Haarlem) and Maria Jans (born 9 November 1603, Haarlem).

== Privateering ==
In 1600, Jan Janszoon began as a Dutch privateer sailing from his home port of Haarlem, working for the state with letters of marque to harass Spanish shipping during the Eighty Years' War. Janszoon overstepped the boundaries of his letters and found his way to the semi-independent port states of the Barbary Coast of North Africa, whence he could attack ships of every foreign state: when he attacked a Spanish ship, he flew the Dutch flag; when he attacked any other, he became an Ottoman captain and flew the crescent moon and star flag of the Turks or the flag of any of various other Mediterranean principalities. During this period, he abandoned his Dutch family.

== Capture by Barbary corsairs ==
Sail plan for a polacca, first built by the Barbary pirates around the 16th century. Many scholars believe the polacca was extensively used by Jan Janszoon. The ship could sail with a large crew of 75 and was armed with 24 cannons.

Janszoon was captured in 1618 at Lanzarote (one of the Canary Islands) by Algerian corsairs and taken to Algiers as a captive. There he "turned Turk", or Muslim. Some historians speculate that the conversion was forced. Janszoon himself, however, tried very hard to convert his fellow Europeans who were Christian to become Muslim and was a passionate Muslim missionary. The Ottoman Turks maintained a precarious measure of influence on behalf of their Sultan by openly encouraging the Moors to advance themselves through piracy against the European powers, which had long resented the Ottoman Empire. After Janszoon's conversion to Islam and the ways of his captors, he sailed with the famous corsair Sulayman Rais, also known as Slemen Reis, who himself was a Dutchman named De Veenboer, whom Janszoon had known before his capture and who had also converted to Islam. They were accompanied by Simon de Danser. But, because Algiers had concluded peace with several European nations, it was no longer a suitable port from which to sell captured ships or their cargo. So, after Sulayman Rais was killed by a cannonball in 1619, Janszoon moved to the ancient port of Salé and began operating from it as a Barbary corsair.

== Republic of Salé ==
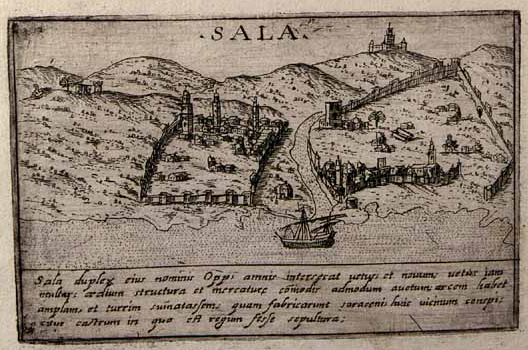
Salé in the 1600s

In 1619, Salé Rovers declared the port an independent republic free from the Sultan. They set up a government that consisted of 14 pirate leaders and elected Janszoon as their President. He also served as the Grand Admiral, known as Murat Reis, of their navy. The Salé fleet totalled about eighteen ships, all small because of the very shallow harbour entrance.

After an unsuccessful siege of the city, the Sultan of Morocco acknowledged its semi-autonomy. Contrary to popular belief that Sultan Zidan Abu Maali had reclaimed sovereignty over Salé and appointed Janszoon the Governor in 1624, the Sultan acknowledged Janszoon's election as president by formally appointing him as his ceremonial governor.

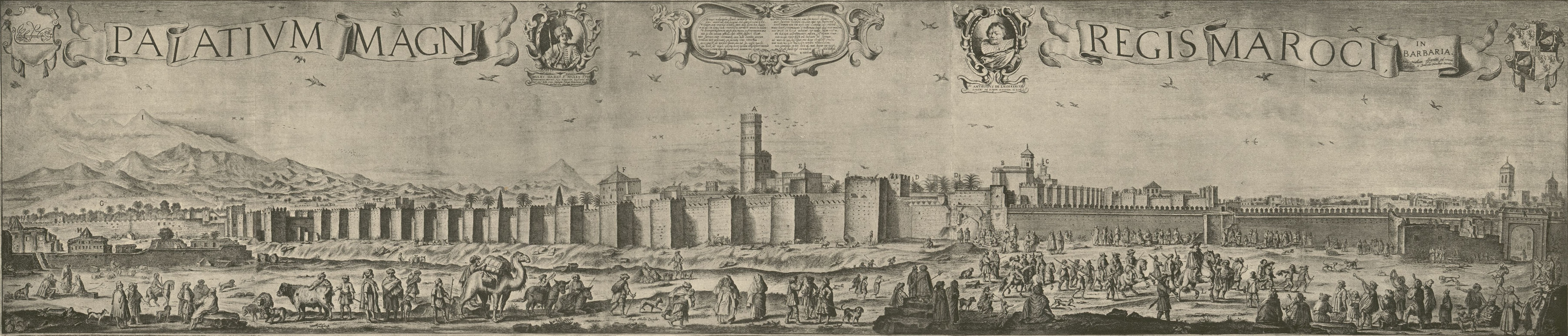
The walls of Marrakesh and El Badi Palace, by Adriaen Matham, 1640

Under Janszoon's leadership, business in Salé thrived. The main sources of income of this republic remained piracy and its by-trades, shipping and dealing in stolen property. Historians have noted Janszoon's intelligence and bravery, which were expressed in his leadership ability. He was forced to find an assistant to keep up, and hired a fellow countryman from the Netherlands, Mathys van Bostel Oosterlinck, who served as his Vice-Admiral.

Janszoon became very wealthy from his income as pirate admiral, payments for anchorage and other harbour dues, and the brokerage of stolen goods. The political climate in Salé worsened toward the end of 1627, so Janszoon moved his family and his entire operation back to semi-independent Algiers.

=== Plea from his Dutch family ===
Janszoon became bored by his new official duties from time to time and again sailed away on a pirate adventure. In 1622, Janszoon and his crews sailed into the English Channel with no particular plan but to try their luck there. When they ran low on supplies, they docked at the port of Veere, Zeeland, under the Moroccan flag, claiming diplomatic privileges from his official role as Admiral of Morocco (a very loose term in the environment of North African politics). The Dutch authorities could not deny the two ships access to Veere because, at the time, several peace treaties and trade agreements existed between the Sultan of Morocco and the Dutch Republic. During Janszoon's anchorage there, the Dutch authorities brought his Dutch first wife and children to the port to try to persuade him to give up piracy. Such strategies utterly failed with the man.

== Diplomacy ==
=== Dutch captives ===
While in Morocco, Janszoon worked to secure the release of Dutch captives from other pirates and prevent them from being sold into slavery.

=== Franco-Moroccan Treaty of 1631 ===
Knowledgeable of several languages, while in Algiers he contributed to the establishment of the Franco-Moroccan Treaty of 1631 between French King Louis XIII and Sultan Abu Marwan Abd al-Malik II.

== Notable raids ==
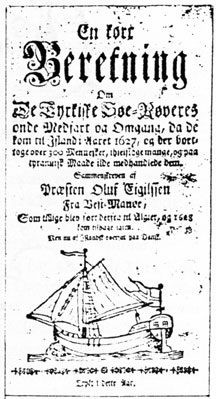
Ólafur Egilsson was captured by Murat Reis the Younger

=== Lundy ===
In 1627, Janszoon captured the island of Lundy in the Bristol Channel and held it for five years, using it as a base for raiding expeditions.

=== Iceland ===
In 1627, Janszoon used a Danish "slave" (most likely a crew member captured on a Danish ship taken as a pirate prize) to pilot him and his men to Iceland. There they raided the fishing village of Grindavík. Their takings were some salted fish and a few hides, but they also captured twelve Icelanders and three Danes. When they were leaving Grindavík, by means of flying a false flag they managed to trick and capture a Danish merchant ship that was passing.

The ships sailed to Bessastaðir, seat of the Danish governor of Iceland, to raid, but were unable to make a landing – it is said they were thwarted by cannon fire from the local fortifications (Bessastaðaskans) and a quickly mustered group of lancers from the Southern Peninsula. They decided to sail home to Salé, where they sold their captives as slaves.

Two corsair ships from Algiers, possibly connected to Janszoon's raid, came to Iceland on 4 July and plundered there. Then they sailed to Vestmannaeyjar off the southern coast and raided there for three days. This raid was known in Iceland as Tyrkjaránið, "the Turkish Abduction", as the Barbary states were nominally a part of the Ottoman Empire.

Accounts by enslaved Icelanders who spent time on the corsair ships claimed that the conditions for women and children were normal, in that they were permitted to move throughout the ship, except to the quarterdeck. The pirates were seen giving extra food to the children from their own private stashes. A woman who gave birth on board a ship was treated with dignity and afforded privacy and clothing by the pirates. The men were put in the hold of the ships and had their chains removed once the ships were far enough from land. Despite popular claims about the treatment of captives, Icelander accounts do not mention that slaves were raped on the voyage itself, however, Guðríður Símonardóttir, one of the few captives to later return to Iceland, was sold into sex slavery as a concubine. The fate of the captives was quite dim and as many as 100 perished from disease or injury either before or shortly after arriving in Africa, with all being sold into slavery upon arrival, many of whom suffered under brutal conditions. It is estimated that less than 50 ever regained their freedom.

=== Baltimore ===
Having sailed for two months and with little to show for the voyage, Janszoon turned to a captive taken on the voyage, a Roman Catholic named John Hackett, for information on where a profitable raid could be made. The English Puritan residents of Baltimore, a small town in West Cork, Ireland, were resented by local Gaels because they were settled on lands confiscated from the Clan O'Driscoll and, far more importantly, they had ceased paying black rent in return for living on Clan territory. Hackett directed Janszoon towards this town and away from his own. Janszoon sacked Baltimore on 20 June 1631, seizing little property but taking 108 captives, whom he sold as slaves in North Africa. Janszoon was said to have released the Irish and taken only English captives. Shortly after the sack, Hackett was arrested and hanged for his crime. "Here was not a single Christian who was not weeping and who was not full of sadness at the sight of so many honest maidens and so many good women abandoned to the brutality of these barbarians". Only two of the villagers ever returned to their homeland.

=== Raids in the Mediterranean Sea ===
Murat Reis chose to make large profits by raiding Mediterranean islands such as the Balearic Islands, Corsica, Sardinia, and the southern coast of Sicily. He often sold most of his merchandise in Tunis, where he befriended the Dey. He is known to have sailed the Ionian Sea. He fought the Venetians near the coasts of Crete and Cyprus with a corsair crew consisting of Dutch, Moriscos, Arab, Turkish, and Janissaries.

== Capture by Knights of Malta ==
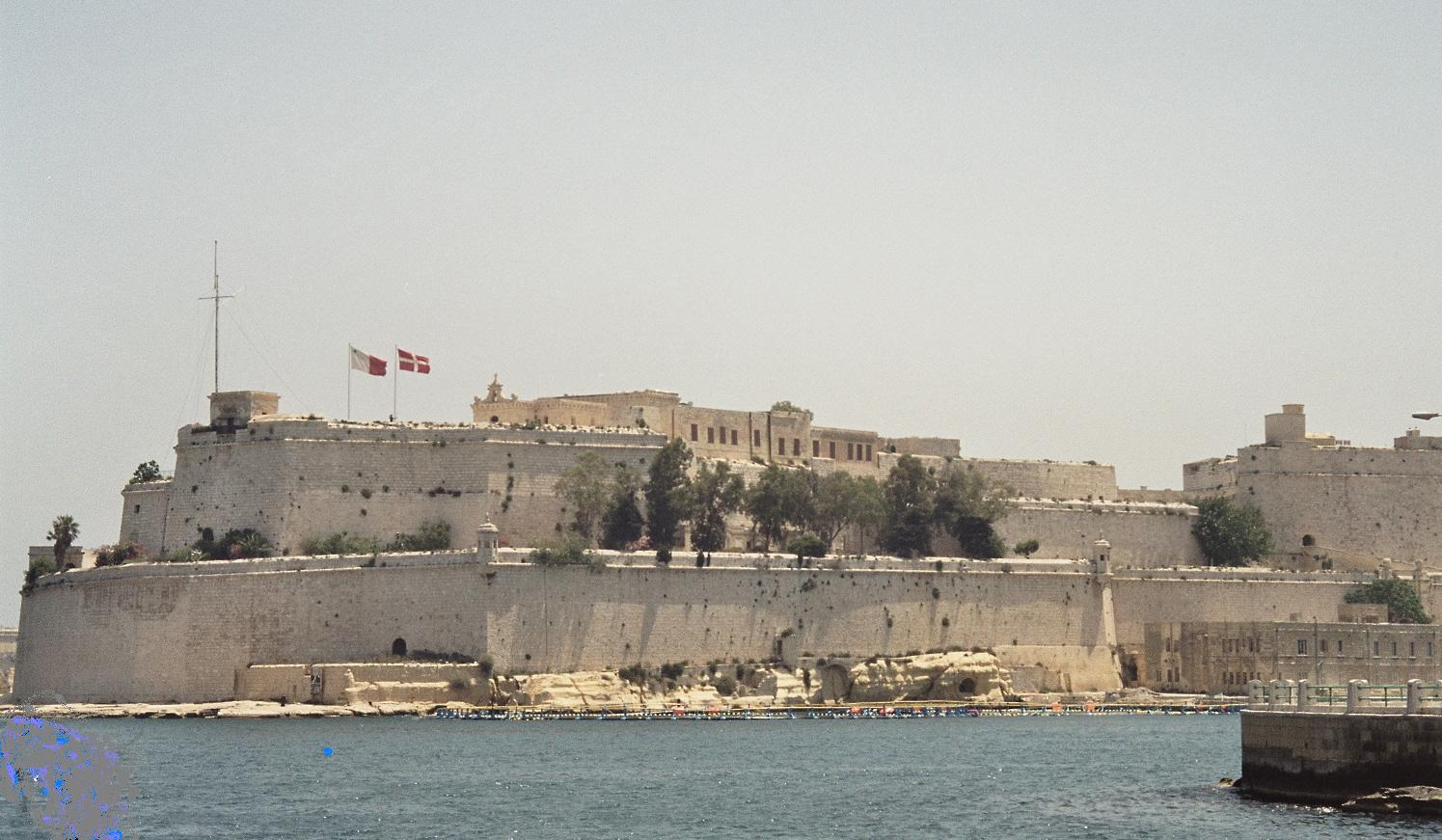
Fort Saint Angelo in Valletta, Malta

In 1635, near the Tunisian coast, Murat Reis was outnumbered and surprised by a sudden attack. He and many of his men were captured by the Knights of Malta. He was imprisoned in the island's notorious dark dungeons. He was mistreated and tortured, and suffered ill health due to his time in the dungeon. In 1640, he barely escaped after a massive Corsair attack, which was carefully planned by the Dey of Tunis in order to rescue their fellow sailors and Corsairs. He was praised upon his return to Algeria and the nearby Barbary States.

== Escape and return to Morocco ==
After Janszoon returned to Morocco in 1640, he was appointed as Governor of the great fortress of Oualidia, near Safi. He resided at the Castle of Maladia. In December 1640, a ship arrived with a new Dutch consul, who brought Lysbeth Janszoon van Haarlem, Janszoon's daughter by his Dutch wife, to visit her father. When Lysbeth arrived, Janszoon "was seated in great pomp on a carpet, with silk cushions, the servants all around him". She saw that Murat Reis had become a feeble, old man. Lysbeth stayed with her father until August 1641, when she returned to Holland. Little is known of Janszoon thereafter. The date of his death remains unknown.

== Marriages and issue ==
In 1603, by a Dutch woman Soetken Gaven, Janszoon's first child was born, Lysbeth Janszoon van Haarlem. After becoming a pirate, Janszoon met an unknown woman in Cartagena, Spain, whom he would marry. The identity of this woman is historically vague, but the consensus is that she was of a multi-ethnic background, considered "Morisco" in Spain. Historians have claimed she was nothing more than a concubine, others claim she was a Muslim Mudéjar who worked for a Christian noble family, and other claims have been made that she was a "Moorish princess." Through this marriage, Janszoon had two children: Abraham Janszoon van Salee and Anthony Janszoon van Salee.

It is speculated that Janszoon married for a third time to the daughter of Sultan Moulay Ziden in 1624.

== Popular culture ==
In 2009, a play based on Janszoon's life as a pirate, "Jan Janszoon, de blonde Arabier", written by Karim El Guennouni toured The Netherlands. "Bad Grandpa: The Ballad of Murad the Captain" is a children's poem about Janszoon published in 2007.

In 2015, Janszoon was a key antagonist in the historical novel Slave to Fortune by D.J. Munro.

In 2024, a documentary series about his life was made in the Netherlands.

== Names ==
Janszoon was also known as Murat Reis the Younger. His Dutch names are also given as Jan Jansen and Jan Jansz; his adopted name as Morat Rais, Murat Rais, Morat; Little John Ward, John Barber, Captain John, and Caid Morato were some of his pirate names. "The Hairdresser" was a nickname of Janszoon.

== See also ==
- Murat Reis the Elder
- Jack Ward
