= List of museums in New York City =

This is a list of museums in New York City, which is home to hundreds of cultural institutions and historic sites, many of which are internationally known. Also included are non-profit art galleries, arts centers, and cultural centers with galleries.

- See also List of museums and cultural institutions in New York City for museums and other visitor attractions including zoos and gardens, performing arts organizations, libraries, and historically-significant sites.
- See also List of museums in New York (state) for museums in the rest of New York state.

== Museums ==
Name	Neighborhood	Borough	Type	Focus	Summary
African Burial Ground National Monument	Lower Manhattan	Manhattan	History	African and African-American	Visitor center and memorial to an 18th-century African-American slave burial ground
A.I.R. Gallery	Dumbo	Brooklyn	Art	Contemporary art	Contemporary art by female artists
AKC Museum of the Dog	Midtown	Manhattan	Animal		
Alice Austen House	Rosebank	Staten Island	Historic house	Photography, film, new media	Home of photographer Alice Austen, also features photography exhibitions
American Academy of Arts and Letters	Washington Heights	Manhattan	Art	Contemporary art	Exhibitions of its members in American literature, music, and art, also recreated studio of composer Charles Ives
American Folk Art Museum	Upper West Side	Manhattan	Art	Folk art	American folk art
American Museum of Natural History	Upper West Side	Manhattan	Natural history	Nature	The world's largest natural history museum. Includes Rose Center for Earth and Space
American Numismatic Society Museum	Lower Manhattan	Manhattan	Numismatic	Financial	Exhibits of coins and medals from all periods and cultures
Americas Society	Upper East Side	Manhattan	Art	Hispanic, Latino, and Caribbean	Exhibits of historic and contemporary art from Latin America, the Caribbean, and Canada
Aperture Foundation	Lower Manhattan	Manhattan	Media	Photography, film, new media	Exhibitions dedicated to contemporary and classic photography
Artists Space	Lower Manhattan	Manhattan	Art	Contemporary art	Non-profit contemporary art gallery
Asia Society	Upper East Side	Manhattan	Art	Asian and Asian-American	Features historic and contemporary Asian art and decorative items
Austrian Cultural Forum New York	Midtown Manhattan	Manhattan	Culture	Contemporary art	Culture center with art exhibition gallery
Autophoto	Lower East Side	Manhattan	Art	Analog photobooth	Preserves, restores, operates, and exhibits vintage chemical-process photobooths
Banksy Museum	SoHo	Manhattan	Art	Street art, contemporary art	Houses the largest collection of life-sized recreations of Banksy's street murals and studio works
Bard Graduate Center	Upper West Side	Manhattan	Art	Design, decorative arts, architecture	Annually organizes two to three exhibitions related to decorative arts, architecture, and design
Bartow-Pell Mansion	Pelham Bay	Bronx	Historic house		Mid-19th-century period mansion and gardens
Bayside Historical Society	Bayside	Queens	History	Local history	Located in the Officer's Club in Fort Totten
Bernard Museum of Judaica	Upper East Side	Manhattan	Jewish	European Jewish and Jewish-American	Located in Temple Emanu-El, Jewish art, religious ornaments, and Temple memorabilia
Billiou-Stillwell-Perine House	Old Town	Staten Island	Historic house		17th-century Dutch colonial house, operated by Historic Richmond Town
Brooklyn Navy Yard Center at BLDG 92	Brooklyn Navy Yard	Brooklyn	Multiple	American and NY history	website, history of the former Navy yard, tours, plans for its future, exhibits of local art, photography, history
Bone Museum	Williamsburg	Brooklyn	Science		Collection of skeletons owned by physicians
Bowne House	Flushing	Queens	Historic house		Oldest house in Queens, dates back to the mid-1600s
BRIC House		Brooklyn	Art	Contemporary art	Contemporary art and new media
Bronx Children's Museum	Concourse, Bronx	Bronx	Children's		
Bronx Museum of the Arts	Concourse, Bronx	Bronx	Art	Encyclopedic	Focuses on contemporary and 20th-century art
Bronx River Art Center	West Farms	Bronx	Art	Neighborhood art center	website
Brooklyn Botanic Garden	Park Slope	Brooklyn	Botanical garden	Nature	Includes a bonsai museum and art gallery in the conservatory
Brooklyn Children's Museum	Crown Heights	Brooklyn	Children's		
Brooklyn Museum	Crown Heights	Brooklyn	Art	Encyclopedic	Collections include American art, Egyptian, Classical, and Ancient Near Eastern art, feminist, European, and art of the Pacific Islands
Brooklyn Seltzer Museum	Cypress Hills	Brooklyn	Seltzer production		A museum on the history and production of seltzer water inside a working seltzer factory
Castle Clinton National Monument	Lower Manhattan	Manhattan	History	American and NY history	Fort that contains a museum that is administered by the National Park Service, and is a departure point for visitors to the Statue of Liberty and Ellis Island
Center for Architecture	Greenwich Village	Manhattan	Art	Design, decorative arts, architecture	Exhibits of architecture, urban planning, urban design, and environmental planning
Center for Art and Culture of Bedford-Stuyvesant	Bedford–Stuyvesant	Brooklyn	Art	Neighborhood art center	website, cultural and performing arts center with the Skylight Gallery for visual art
Center for Brooklyn History	Brooklyn Heights	Brooklyn	History	American and NY history	History and culture of Brooklyn
Center for Jewish History	Lower Manhattan	Manhattan	Ethnic - Jewish	European Jewish and Jewish-American	Jewish history and culture around the world
Chaim Gross Studio Museum	Greenwich Village	Manhattan	Art	Sculpture	Operated by the Renee and Chaim Gross Foundation, home and studio of sculptor Chaim Gross
Children's Museum of Manhattan	Upper West Side	Manhattan	Children's		
China Institute	Lower Manhattan	Manhattan	Art	Asian and Asian-American	Galleries with exhibits about traditional Chinese paintings, calligraphy, Chinese folk arts, textiles, and architecture
City Island Nautical Museum	City Island	Bronx	History	American and NY history	Operated by the City Island Historical Society, local history, maritime heritage
City Reliquary	Williamsburg	Brooklyn	History	Local history	Memorabilia and artifacts about New York City
Clemente Soto Velez Cultural and Educational Center	Lower Manhattan	Manhattan	Culture	Hispanic, Latino and Caribbean	Cultivates Latino culture and acts as a hub for visual and performing arts on the Lower East Side
The Cloisters	Washington Heights	Manhattan	Art	European	Art and architecture of the European Middle Ages, branch of the Metropolitan Museum of Art
Columbia University Rare Book & Manuscript Library	Upper West Side	Manhattan	Library	Books, drawings, illustrations, prints	Two galleries with free exhibitions from the collections
Coney Island Museum	Coney Island	Brooklyn	Amusement	Amusements	History of Coney Island's amusement park, beach, and neighborhood
Conference House	Tottenville	Staten Island	Historic house		Only pre-Revolutionary manor house still surviving in New York City
Cooper Hewitt, Smithsonian Design Museum	Museum Mile	Manhattan	Design	Design, decorative arts, architecture	Part of the Smithsonian, decorative arts and design
Cooper Union Galleries	East Village	Manhattan	Art	Contemporary art	Several galleries with works by students, faculty and guest artists in art, architecture, design, photography
Czech Centre New York	Upper East Side	Manhattan	Culture	Contemporary art	website, exhibits of Czech artists, located in Bohemian National Hall
Derfner Judaica Museum	Riverdale	Bronx	Ethnic - Jewish	European Jewish and Jewish-American	Includes the Art Collection at The Hebrew Home at Riverdale
Dia:Chelsea	Lower Manhattan	Manhattan	Art	One of the twelve locations and sites the Dia Art Foundation manages.	
Dr. Bernard Heller Museum	Greenwich Village	Manhattan	Ethnic - Jewish	European Jewish and Jewish-American	website, part of Hebrew Union College, art exploring Jewish identity, history, culture, and experience
Drawing Center	SoHo	Manhattan	Art	Books, drawings, illustrations, prints	Contemporary and historical drawings
Dyckman Farmhouse Museum	Inwood	Manhattan	Historic house		Late 18th-century farmhouse; the oldest remaining farmhouse on Manhattan island
Edgar Allan Poe Cottage	Fordham	Bronx	Historic house		1840s house where author Edgar Allan Poe lived
El Museo del Barrio	East Harlem	Manhattan	Art	Hispanic, Latino, and Caribbean	Latin American and Caribbean art, with an emphasis on works from Puerto Rico and the Puerto Rican community in New York City
Ellis Island Museum	Lower Manhattan	Manhattan	History	American and NY history	Tours by boat from Battery Park in Manhattan or Liberty State Park in Jersey City, New Jersey, immigration experience and history of the immigrants
Federal Hall National Memorial	Lower Manhattan	Manhattan	History	American and NY history	Site of first capitol of the United States of America and of George Washington's first inauguration in 1789
FDNY Fire Zone	Midtown Manhattan	Manhattan	Firefighting		website, fire safety learning center operated by the FDNY, located in Rockefeller Center
Fordham Museum of Greek, Etruscan and Roman Art	Fordham	Bronx	Art	Antiquities	Collection of ancient antiquities in William D. Walsh Family Library of Fordham University
Fort Totten	Bayside	Queens	Military		Tours of the Civil War-era fort
Fort Wadsworth	Fort Wadsworth	Staten Island	Military		Exhibits and tours of the mid-19th-century fort
Fraunces Tavern	Lower Manhattan	Manhattan	History	American and NY history	Reconstruction of a tavern with a prominent role in pre-Revolution and American Revolution history
Frick Collection	Upper East Side	Manhattan	Art	European	Mansion with collection of old master paintings and fine furniture
Gallery Korea	Midtown Manhattan	Manhattan	Art	Asian and Asian-American	Part of the Korean Cultural Service, contemporary Korean art
Garibaldi-Meucci Museum	Rosebank	Staten Island	Ethnic	Italian	Home of Italian politician Giuseppe Garibaldi and inventor Antonio Meucci, celebrates Italian American culture and heritage
George Gustav Heye Center	Lower Manhattan	Manhattan	Native American		Part of the Smithsonian, Native American history, culture, and art
General Grant National Memorial	Upper West Side	Manhattan	History	American and NY history	Mausoleum of General Ulysses Grant and his wife, displays about his life and Presidency
Godwin-Ternbach Museum	Kew Gardens Hills	Queens	Art	Encyclopedic	Part of Queens College, City University of New York, collection includes painting, sculpture and decorative arts, prints and drawings, and ethnographic arts from all periods and cultures, Western and non-Western
Governors Island National Monument	Governors Island	Manhattan	Military		Includes tours of Castle Williams, an 1807 fort and prison, and Fort Jay, a coastal star fort; open seasonally
Gracie Mansion	Upper East Side	Manhattan	Historic house		Official residence of the Mayor of New York City
Greater Astoria Historical Society	Astoria	Queens	History	American and NY history	Local history
Green-Wood Cemetery	Greenwood Heights	Brooklyn	History	American and NY history	Exhibits of history related to people buried in the historic cemetery, themed tours
Grey Art Gallery	Greenwich Village	Manhattan	Art		Part of New York University, emphasizes art's historical, cultural, and social context
Grolier Club	Upper East Side	Manhattan	Literary	Books, drawings, illustrations, prints	Public exhibitions from its book and literary collections
Ground Zero Museum Workshop	Lower Manhattan	Manhattan	History	American and NY history	website, history of the September 11 attacks and the workers at the World Trade Center site
Guggenheim Museum	Museum Mile	Manhattan	Art	Modern art	Designed by Frank Lloyd Wright, Impressionist, Post-Impressionist, early Modern, and contemporary art
Hall of Fame for Great Americans	University Heights	Bronx	Hall of fame	American and NY history	Part of Bronx Community College, National Landmark founded as a pantheon honoring historically significant American men and women
Hamilton Grange National Memorial	Hamilton Heights	Manhattan	Historic house		Relocated early 19th-century home of Alexander Hamilton
Harbor Defense Museum	Bay Ridge	Brooklyn	Military		Located in Fort Hamilton, 19th-century fort with exhibits of NY military history
Hispanic Society of America	Washington Heights	Manhattan	Art	Hispanic, Latino and Caribbean	Spanish, Portuguese, and Latin American art and artifacts
Historic Richmond Town	Richmondtown	Staten Island	Living	American and NY history	Over 30 historic buildings and sites dating from the late 17th to the early 20th century; includes the Lake-Tysen House and Voorlezer's House
Hostos Center for the Arts & Culture	Mott Haven	Bronx	Art	Art center	The Longwood Art Gallery at Hostos presents a seasonal showcase of different Latin American artists
International Center of Photography	Lower East Side	Manhattan	Photography	Photography, film, new media	Photography exhibits
Intrepid Sea, Air & Space Museum	Hell's Kitchen	Manhattan	Military		Showcases the World War II aircraft carrier USS Intrepid, Space Shuttle Enterprise, submarine USS Growler, a Concorde supersonic airplane, helicopters and military aircraft
Jacques Marchais Museum of Tibetan Art	Egbertville	Staten Island	Art	Asian and Asian-American	Art and artifacts of the Himalayas
Jamaica Center for Arts & Learning	Jamaica	Queens	Art	Neighborhood art center	Cultural center with art gallery
Japan Society	Midtown Manhattan	Manhattan	Cultural	Asian and Asian-American	Features exhibit gallery for Japanese art
Jewish Children's Museum	Crown Heights	Brooklyn	Children's	European Jewish and Jewish-American	Jewish heritage, fostering tolerance and understanding
Jewish Museum	Museum Mile	Manhattan	Ethnic - Jewish	European Jewish and Jewish-American	Modern and contemporary Jewish art, history
Jewish Theological Seminary Library Galleries	Upper West Side	Manhattan	Ethnic - Jewish	European Jewish and Jewish-American	website, free exhibitions from the library's collections of Jewish heritage
John J. Harvey	Lower Manhattan	Manhattan	Maritime	Transportation	Fireboat under restoration, offers occasional public tours and rides
King Manor	Jamaica	Queens	Historic house		Early 19th-century home of Rufus King, a signer of the United States Constitution
Kingsland Homestead	Flushing	Queens	Historic house		Member of the Historic House Trust, operated by the Queens Historical Society, Victorian period house, local history exhibits
Korea Society	Midtown Manhattan	Manhattan	Art	Asian and Asian-American	Cultural society with gallery of Korean art and culture
Lefferts Historic House	Park Slope	Brooklyn	Historic house		Located in Prospect Park, 1820s period house
Lehman College Art Gallery	Jerome Park	Bronx	Art	Contemporary art	website, part of Lehman College
Leslie-Lohman Museum of Gay and Lesbian Art	SoHo	Manhattan	Art		Contemporary and historical gay-related art
Lewis H. Latimer House	Flushing	Queens	Historic house	African and African-American	Home of African American inventor Lewis H. Latimer
The Living Museum	Queens Village	Queens	Art	Contemporary art	Part of Creedmoor Psychiatric Center, art dedicated to, and created by individuals with a mental illness
Living Torah Museum	Borough Park	Brooklyn	Ethnic - Jewish	European Jewish and Jewish-American	Ancient artifacts mentioned in the Torah, items from the Biblical period
Louis Armstrong House	Corona	Queens	Historic house	Performing arts	Home of musician Louis Armstrong
Lower East Side Tenement Museum	Lower Manhattan	Manhattan	Historic house	American and NY history	Immigrant experience
Madame Tussauds New York	Midtown Manhattan	Manhattan	Wax museum	Amusements	Famous figures in entertainment
Maritime Industry Museum	Throggs Neck	Bronx	Maritime	Transportation	Located in Fort Schuyler, history of the US maritime industry including commercial shipping, the merchant marine, and the port of New York
Merchant's House Museum	Greenwich Village	Manhattan	Historic house		19th-century family town home
Metropolitan Museum of Art	Museum Mile	Manhattan	Art	Encyclopedic	One of the world's largest and most visited art museums, includes American art and decorative arts, European, African, Asian, Ancient Egyptian, Roman and Greek art, Byzantine and Islamic art, modern art
Mets Hall of Fame & Museum	Flushing	Queens	Sports	Amusements	Located at Citi Field, New York Mets baseball history
Miriam and Ira D. Wallach Art Gallery	Upper West Side	Manhattan	Art	Contemporary art	website, part of Columbia University
Mmuseumm	TriBeCa	Manhattan	Design	Contemporary Archaeology	Contemporary vernacular design from around the world
MoCADA: Museum of Contemporary African Diasporan Arts	Fort Greene	Brooklyn	Art	African and African-American	Art focusing on social and political issues facing the African Diaspora
MoMA PS1	Long Island City	Queens	Art	Contemporary art	Contemporary art museum, part of Museum of Modern Art
The Morgan Library & Museum	Midtown Manhattan	Manhattan	Art	Books, drawings, illustrations, prints	Includes books and printed materials, prints, and drawings of European artists, material from ancient Egypt and medieval liturgical objects, ancient Near Eastern cylinder seals, music manuscripts
Morris-Jumel Mansion	Washington Heights	Manhattan	Historic house		18th-century period mansion used as headquarters for both sides in the American Revolution
Mossman Lock Museum	Midtown Manhattan	Manhattan	Commodity	Financial	Bank and vault locks and cases, part of the General Society of Mechanics and Tradesmen of the City of New York
Mount Vernon Hotel Museum	Midtown Manhattan	Manhattan	Historic house		Early 19th period-century hotel
Museum at Eldridge Street	Lower Manhattan	Manhattan	Ethnic - American Jewish	European Jewish and Jewish-American	American Jewish history and culture in a restored historic synagogue
Museum at FIT	Lower Manhattan	Manhattan	Textile	Design, decorative arts, architecture	Fashion museum, part of Fashion Institute of Technology
Museum of American Finance	Lower Manhattan	Manhattan	Industry - Finance	Financial	Financial markets, money, banking, entrepreneurship, and Alexander Hamilton
Museum of American Illustration	Midtown Manhattan	Manhattan	Art	Books, drawings, illustrations, prints	Part of the Society of Illustrators, American illustration
Museum of Arts and Design	Upper West Side	Manhattan	Art	Design, decorative arts, architecture	Features contemporary hand-made objects in a variety of media, including clay, glass, metal, fiber, and wood, located at Columbus Circle
Museum of Chinese in America	Chinatown	Manhattan	Ethnic - Chinese American	Asian and Asian-American	History of North America's Chinatowns and the cultural contributions of Chinese immigrants
Museum of Jewish Heritage	Lower Manhattan	Manhattan	Ethnic - Jewish	European Jewish and Jewish-American	Modern Jewish history and the Holocaust
Museum of Mathematics	Chelsea	Manhattan	Science		Interactive exhibits about mathematics
Museum of Modern Art (MoMA)	Midtown Manhattan	Manhattan	Art	Modern art	Modern art including architecture and design, drawings, painting, sculpture, photography, prints, illustrated books and artist's books, film, and electronic media
Museum of Public Relations	Midtown Manhattan	Manhattan	Media	History of public relations	website, a public relations museum and reference library, part of Baruch College’s Newman Library Archives and Special Collections, open to the public by appointment for tours, guest lectures and research
Museum of Reclaimed Urban Space	East Village	Manhattan	History		History of grassroots urban space activism
Museum of Sex	Rose Hill	Manhattan	Sex		History, evolution, and cultural significance of human sexuality
Museum of the City of New York	Museum Mile	Manhattan	Multiple		Art and local history
Museum of the Moving Image	Astoria	Queens	Media	film, video, digital media	Exhibitions and programs dedicated to the art, history, technique, and technology of film, television, digital media, video games, the internet, and more.
National Academy Museum and School	Museum Mile	Manhattan	Art	Design, decorative arts, architecture	Exhibits of art and architecture from its collections
National Lighthouse Museum	St. George	Staten Island	Maritime	Transportation	Dedicated to the history of lighthouses and their keepers
National September 11 Memorial & Museum	Lower Manhattan	Manhattan	History	American and New York history	Memorial and museum dedicated to victims of 9/11 attacks
Lilac Preservation Project	Tribeca	Manhattan	History	Maritime History	Preservation and restoration of the USCGC Lilac
National Jazz Museum in Harlem	Harlem	Manhattan	Music	Performing arts	Harlem's jazz history
National Track and Field Hall of Fame	Washington Heights	Manhattan	Sports	Amusements	Operated by The Armory Foundation in conjunction with USA Track & Field
New Africa Center	Museum Mile	Manhattan	Art	African and African-American	African art and culture, not open yet, building new facility on Museum Mile, formerly known as Museum for African Art
Neue Galerie	Museum Mile	Manhattan	Art	Modern art	Gallery of early-20th-century German and Austrian art and design
Newhouse Center for Contemporary Art	West New Brighton	Staten Island	Art	Contemporary art	Part of Snug Harbor Cultural Center, contemporary art
New Museum	East Village	Manhattan	Art	Contemporary art	Contemporary art from around the world
New York Botanical Garden	Fordham	Bronx	Botanical garden	Nature	Includes Mertz Library with exhibitions relating to botanical themes and the Enid A. Haupt Conservatory
New York Earth Room	SoHo	Manhattan	Art	Contemporary art	Permanent exhibit of earth covered room
New York Hall of Science	Flushing	Queens	Science		Topics include biology, chemistry and physics
New York Historical Society	Upper West Side	Manhattan	History	American and NY history	History of New York and the United States
New York City Fire Museum	SoHo	Manhattan	Firefighting		Historical and modern firefighting vehicles, equipment, uniforms
New York Public Library Main Branch	Midtown Manhattan	Manhattan	Multiple	Books, drawings, illustrations, prints	Exhibitions about art, history, culture, photography from its collections
New York Public Library for the Performing Arts	Upper West Side	Manhattan	Art	Performing arts	Exhibitions about the performing arts, located at Lincoln Center for the Performing Arts
New York School of Interior Design Gallery	Midtown Manhattan	Manhattan	Art	Design, decorative arts, architecture	Free gallery with exhibits about interior design
New York Sign Museum	East New York	Brooklyn	History/culture	Historical New York business signage	Recovered business signs hosted in an active workshop
New York Transit Museum	Brooklyn Heights	Brooklyn	Transportation	Transportation	Subways, trolleys, and buses
New York Transit Museum	Midtown Manhattan	Manhattan	Transportation	Transportation	Subway and train system of NY, located in Grand Central Terminal
New York Yankees Museum		Bronx	Sports	Amusements	Located in Yankee Stadium, history and memorabilia of the New York Yankees
Nicholas Roerich Museum	Upper West Side	Manhattan	Art	Asian and Asian-American	Works by Nicholas Roerich
Noble Maritime Collection	West New Brighton	Staten Island	Maritime	Transportation	Part of Snug Harbor Cultural Center, houseboat and artist studio
Noguchi Museum	Long Island City	Queens	Art	Sculpture	Works by sculptor Isamu Noguchi
Old Stone House	Park Slope	Brooklyn	Historic house		Reconstructed 1699 Dutch stone farmhouse with Revolutionary War ties, focuses on evolving histories of Brooklyn, New York and the United States
Paley Center for Media	Midtown Manhattan	Manhattan	Media	television, radio, new media	Cultural, creative and social significance of television, radio, the Internet, and emerging media platforms
Park Avenue Armory	Upper East Side	Manhattan	Art	Contemporary art	Presents art exhibitions
Parsons The New School for Design Gallery	Greenwich Village	Manhattan	Art	Design, decorative arts, architecture	Exhibits of art and design in the Sheila C. Johnson Design Center
Poster House	Chelsea	Manhattan	Art	Posters	website, first museum in the United States dedicated exclusively to posters
Print Center New York	Chelsea	Manhattan	Art	Books, drawings, illustrations, prints	Exhibition and understanding of fine art prints
Queens College Art Center	Flushing	Queens	Art	Neighborhood art center	website, part of Queens College
Queens County Farm Museum	Glen Oaks	Queens	Farm		Working farm dating back to 1697
Queens Museum	Flushing	Queens	Art	Contemporary Art	Focus on social practice, artist in residence programs, and education. Includes a collection of Tiffany glass and the Panorama of the City of New York.
RiseNY	Times Square	Manhattan	History, Culture	New York City history and pop culture	An immersive museum that explores New York City's history and culture through interactive galleries and a soaring ride over its iconic landmarks
Rose Museum	Midtown Manhattan	Manhattan	Music	Performing arts	Chronicles the history Carnegie Hall from the collections of its archives
Rubin Museum of Art	Lower Manhattan	Manhattan	Art	Asian and Asian-American	Art of the Himalayas and surrounding regions
Salmagundi Museum of American Art	Lower Manhattan	Manhattan	Art	American representational art	website American representational art from 1840s to today run by the Salmagundi Club
Sandy Ground Historical Museum	South Shore	Staten Island	Ethnic	African and African-American	Operated by the Sandy Ground Historical Society, community and Staten Island's African-American culture and history
Scandinavia House – The Nordic Center in America	Midtown Manhattan	Manhattan	Ethnic	Scandinavian	Art, design, and historical exhibitions of the Nordic countries
Schomburg Center for Research in Black Culture	Harlem	Manhattan	Ethnic - African American	African and African-American	Branch of the New York Public Library, exhibits of African American story, culture
SculptureCenter	Long Island City	Queens	Art	Sculpture	Dedicated to experimental and innovative developments in contemporary sculpture
Seguine Mansion	South Shore	Staten Island	Historic house		Mid-19th-century mansion
Skyscraper Museum	Lower Manhattan	Manhattan	Architecture	Design, decorative arts, architecture	Currently the only museum in the world dedicated to skyscrapers
Socrates Sculpture Park	Astoria	Queens	Art	Sculpture	Outdoor museum and public park where artists can create and exhibit sculptures and multi-media installations
South Street Seaport Museum	Lower Manhattan	Manhattan	Maritime	Transportation	Includes exhibition galleries, a working 19th-century print shop, an archeology museum and several historic museum ships including the four-masted Peking
Staten Island Children's Museum	West New Brighton	Staten Island	Children's		Part of Snug Harbor Cultural Center
Staten Island Museum	West New Brighton	Staten Island	Multiple	Encyclopedic	Natural history, art, history, science, part of Snug Harbor Cultural Center
Statue of Liberty	Liberty Island	Manhattan	History	American and NY history	Accessible by boat from Battery Park in Manhattan and Liberty State Park in Jersey City, New Jersey
Studio Museum in Harlem	Harlem	Manhattan	Art	African and African-American	Art of African-Americans, specializing in 19th- and 20th-century work as well as exhibits of Caribbean and African art
Sugar Hill Children's Museum of Art & Storytelling	Harlem	Manhattan	Children's		
Swiss Institute Contemporary Art New York	Lower Manhattan	Manhattan	Art	Contemporary art	Contemporary art
Terrain Gallery	SoHo	Manhattan	Art	Contemporary art	Exhibits of contemporary paintings, prints, drawings, and photographs
The Shed	Hudson Yards	Manhattan	Art	Contemporary art	Hosts activities in a wide range of cultural areas including art, performance, film, design, food, fashion, and new combinations of cultural content
Theodore Roosevelt Birthplace National Historic Site	Lower Manhattan	Manhattan	Historic house		Recreated 1865 period brownstone home where Theodore Roosevelt lived as a child
Tibet House US	Lower Manhattan	Manhattan	Art	Asian and Asian-American	Classical and contemporary Tibetan art
Trinity Church	Lower Manhattan	Manhattan	History		History of the church, changing art, religious and cultural exhibits
Ukrainian Institute of America	Museum Mile	Manhattan	Art	European	Features exhibits of notable Ukrainian artists living in the states and other events related to Ukrainian heritage
Ukrainian Museum	East Village	Manhattan	Ethnic - Ukrainian-American	European	Ukrainian heritage in America including folk art and fine art
United Nations Headquarters	Midtown Manhattan	Manhattan	Historic building		Includes exhibits on such topics as peacekeeping operations, decolonization and disarmament, and the United Nations Art Collection
Valentine Museum of Art	East Flatbush	Brooklyn	Art	Contemporary art	Museum dedicated to living artists and their work
Valentine Museum of Art at Medgar Evers College	Crown Heights	Brooklyn	Art	Contemporary art	Museum extension within Medgar Evers College, CUNY
Valentine-Varian House	Norwood	Bronx	Historic house		Houses the Museum of Bronx History, operated by the Bronx County Historical Society
Van Cortlandt House Museum	Riverdale	Bronx	Historic house		18th-century period manor house
Vander Ende-Onderdonk House	Ridgewood	Queens	Historic house		Oldest Dutch Colonial stone house in New York City, operated by the Greater Ridgewood Historical Society
Voelker Orth Museum	Flushing	Queens	Historic house	Nature	German immigrant family’s 1890s home and garden, exhibits of cultural and horticultural heritage of Flushing, Queens and adjacent communities
Waterfront Museum	Red Hook	Brooklyn	Maritime	Transportation	website, historic floating barge museum in Red Hook
Wave Hill	Riverdale	Bronx	Botanical garden	Nature	Botanical garden with art gallery and interpretive visitor center
Weeksville Heritage Center	Bedford–Stuyvesant	Brooklyn	History	African and African-American	History of the 19th-century African American community of Weeksville, Brooklyn - one of America’s first free black communities
White Columns	Greenwich Village	Manhattan	Art	Contemporary art	Alternative art gallery
Whitney Museum of American Art	Lower Manhattan	Manhattan	Art	Modern art	20th-century American art and contemporary American art by living artists
Williamsburg Art & Historical Center	Williamsburg	Brooklyn	Art	Neighborhood art center	Art exhibitions, performances and cultural events
Wyckoff House	Canarsie	Brooklyn	Historic house		Dutch saltbox frame house dating back to 1652
Yeshiva University Museum	Lower Manhattan	Manhattan	Ethnic - Jewish	European Jewish and Jewish-American	Also an archaeology, history, and art museum focused on Jewish subjects

== Defunct museums ==
- 9/11 Tribute Museum
- AIGA National Design Center
- American Museum of Immigration, Liberty Island
- Art in General
- Barnum's American Museum, Manhattan
- Chelsea Art Museum, Manhattan, closed in 2011
- Children's Museum of the Arts
- Con Edison Energy Museum, Manhattan
- Choco-Story New York
- Dahesh Museum of Art, Exhibits art from its collection at other museums
- Discovery Times Square, closed in 2016
- Enrico Caruso Museum of America
- Fisher Landau Center
- Forbes Galleries, closed in 2014
- FusionArts Museum
- Guggenheim Soho, Manhattan
- Kurdish Library and Museum, Brooklyn
- Met Breuer, Manhattan, closed July 2020
- MICRO Museum, Brooklyn
- Morbid Anatomy Museum, Brooklyn, closed in 2016
- Museum of Biblical Art, closed in 2015
- Museum of Comic and Cartoon Art, closed in 2012, collections now part of the Society of Illustrators
- Museum of Living Art, 1927-1943 at NYU, modern art collection of Albert Eugene Gallatin
- Museum of Primitive Art, closed in 1976, collections now part of the Metropolitan Museum of Art
- Museum of the American Piano, Manhattan, website
- National Museum of Catholic Art and History, closed in 2010
- New York Jazz Museum in Manhattan
- New York City Police Museum
- New York Tattoo Museum in Staten Island
- Proteus Gowanus, Brooklyn, closed in 2015
- Ripley's Believe It or Not!, midtown Manhattan, 2007-2021
- Rock and Roll Hall of Fame Annex, opened in SoHo in 2008, closed in 2010
- Sony Wonder Technology Lab, closed in 2016
- Sports Museum of America, Manhattan, opened in 2008, closed in 2009
- Store Front Museum, Queens
- UBS Art Gallery, Manhattan

== See also ==
- List of museums in New York
- Museum Mile, New York City
- Category:Tourist attractions in New York City
