= List of museums in New York =

List of museums in New York may refer to:

- List of museums in New York (state)
- List of museums in New York City
