= Barbara Westermann =

German-American sculptor

Barbara Westermann (born Swiezinski, in Werdohl, Germany in 1958) is a conceptual and site-specific sculptor, artist and teacher living in Red Hook, New York. She has lived and worked in New York City for many years and continues to work on projects there and in Berlin.

== Education ==
She received her B.A. in Architecture & Urban Planning from the University of Kassel, Germany, 1982-77 and her MFA in Sculpture from Fachhochschule Koln, Germany, 1985-82. She studied with Daniel Spoerri and Eduardo Paolozzi. After moving to New York City, she studied at the Whitney Museum Independent Study Program and completed the education certificate at the School of Visual Arts.

== Art ==
Westermann is a sculptor and installation artist. Her sculptures, prints, and drawings are minimalist and conceptual, with an emphasis on social sculpture, urban planning, geometry, geophysical mapping, and music. Westerman uses site-specific work that involves sculpture, prints, architecture, and engineering. She uses sculpture to embody utilitarian objects.

Westermann was the co-editor of Kunstforum International issue number 51 with Brigitte Caster. She has shown her work widely, including single shows at Kunstverein Malkasten in Düsseldorf, the La Jolla Museum of Contemporary Art, and the Museum fur Neue Kunst Museum in Freiburg, Germany. She delivered a lecture called 'documenta urbana' at the Documenta 13 with Critical Art Ensemble in Kassel, Germany and showed a video during the 'undocumenta' of 2021.

She completed a fellowship at the Raketenstation Stiftung Hombroich in the fall of 2012 and was a fellow at the Virginia Center for the Creative Arts in Virginia. She publishes prints with Clay Street Press in Cincinnati.

== Exhibitions ==
Her art has been shown at the Tate in London, the Whitney Biennial, MoMA PS1, the Dia Art Foundation, Momenta Art, Paula Cooper Gallery, Ronald Feldman Gallery, E|AB Fair, Clay Street Press in Cincinnati, Proteus Gowanus, the Museum of the National Library of Spain, and numerous other venues in the States and Europe.

Recent projects include work at Turley Gallery, Lexington Arts & Science, Neon Kunst and Women's Studio Workshop, Queens Council on the Arts and teaching through the Bard College Lifetime Learning Institute at the Hessel Museum of Art.

She was included in Flugblätter at Cross Lane Projects, Kendal, Art for the Future at Tufts University and Super Dakota gallery in Brussels. She has shown her work with Clay Street Press Gallery in Cincinnati, OH and Cade Tompkins Gallery in Providence, RI.

== Awards ==
- Rhode Island State Council on the Arts, 1999
- Pollock-Krasner Foundation Grant, 1988
- Art Matters Foundation Grant, 1988

== Art in Publications ==
- Art Demonstration, Group Material, MIT Press, 2022.
- 100 degrees West - 80 degrees East Meridian, Clay Street Press, 2020
- 'Sculpture and Data: History, Function, Invisibility in Architecture' by Alexandra Keiser, 2019
- Geographies, Clay Street Press Gallery, 2013
- Providence Art Club, Providence, RI 2005
- Exhibition review, Clay Street Press Gallery, Sara Eisen, The Cincinnati Enquirer, 2004
- WindSeaSky catalog, Newport, RI, 2004
- Essay by Vesela Sretenovic, Bell Gallery, Brown University, 'Observatory,' 2004
- Exhibition review, A.R.T. Gallery, by Ken Johnson, New York Times, 2000
- Immobile Spaces, Bell Gallery exhibition, Vesela Sretenovic, Brown University, 1999
- Group Material at P.S. 1, New York, 1999
- Art of the Millennium, by Burkhardt Riemschneider, Taschen, 1999
- Blurring the Boundaries: Installation Art 1969-1996, essays by Hugh Davies and Ron Onorato, Museum of Contemporary Art, San Diego, 1997
- Artist's work included in Timeline, Robin Kahn, Creative Time, 1995
- Artist's Portfolio, Chelsea (magazine), 1994
- Barbara Westermann, monograph, Museum für Neue Kunst (Freiburg im Breisgau), 1988
- LivingRoom magazine, Amsterdam, 1985
- Editor, Kunstforum International, Nr. 51, Kassel, Germany, 1980
