= Lloyd Ultan (historian) =

American historian (born 1938)

- Born: 1938 (age 87–88); The Bronx, New York, U.S.
- Education: Hunter College; Columbia University
- Occupation: Historian
- Employer: Fairleigh Dickinson University
- Organization: The Bronx County Historical Society
- Known for: Histories of The Bronx
- Notable work: The Northern Borough: A History Of The Bronx
- Title: Bronx Borough Historian emeritus
- Predecessor: Dr. William A. Tieck

Lloyd Ultan (born 1938) is an American historian and author. A native of the borough of The Bronx in New York City, he was the Bronx borough historian from 1996 to 2023. He is a professor of history at Fairleigh Dickinson University's and a member of the adjunct faculty at Lehman College. Ultan received a B.A. in history from Hunter College in 1959 and an M.A. in history from Columbia University in 1960.

He has written several books, including The Beautiful Bronx (1920-1950), The Bronx in the Innocent Years: 1890-1925, and Bronx Accent. Ultan is renowned for his walking tours. His predecessor as the official Bronx Borough Historian was Dr. William A. Tieck, who served from 1980 to 1996.

== Selected works ==
- Legacy of the Revolution: The Valentine-Varian House (1983), popular general history
- Bronx Accent: A Literary and Pictorial History of the Borough (2006), popular general history
- Blacks in the Colonial Bronx Era: A Documentary History (2010), popular general history
- The Bronx: The Ultimate Guide to New York City's Beautiful Borough (2015), popular general history
- The Northern Borough: A History Of The Bronx (2009), popular general history
- The Bronx in the frontier era: from the beginning to 1696 (1994)
- The Beautiful Bronx (1920–1950) (1979), heavily illustrated
- The Birth of the Bronx, 1609–1900 (2000), popular
- The Bronx in the innocent years, 1890–1925 (1985), popular
- The Bronx: It Was Only Yesterday, 1935–1965 (1992), heavily illustrated popular history
- "History of the Bronx River," Paper presented to the Bronx River Alliance, November 5, 2002 (notes taken by Maarten de Kadt, November 16, 2002), retrieved on August 29, 2008. This 2½ hour talk covers much of the early history of the Bronx as a whole, in addition to the Bronx River.

== See also ==
- History of the Bronx
- Gary Hermalyn - Centennial Historian of New York City.
- The Bronx County Historical Society

Educational offices
Preceded by Dr. William A. Tieck	Bronx Borough Historian; 1996–2023	Succeeded by Ángel Hérnandez
