= Gary Hermalyn =

American historian and author

- Born: The Bronx, New York, U.S.
- Education: Columbia University
- Occupation: Historian
- Organization: The Bronx County Historical Society
- Known for: Histories of The Bronx, Edgar Allan Poe and New York City.
- Notable work: Publications of the Bronx County Historical Society: 1955–2000

Gary "Doc" Hermalyn is an American historian and writer, based in New York City. He is an Edgar Allan Poe scholar, and an authority on the history of The Bronx. Hermalyn is editor/author of 172 books on urban history, geography, education, natural history and exploration. He is CEO of The Bronx County Historical Society and a fellow of The Explorers Club.

== Biography ==
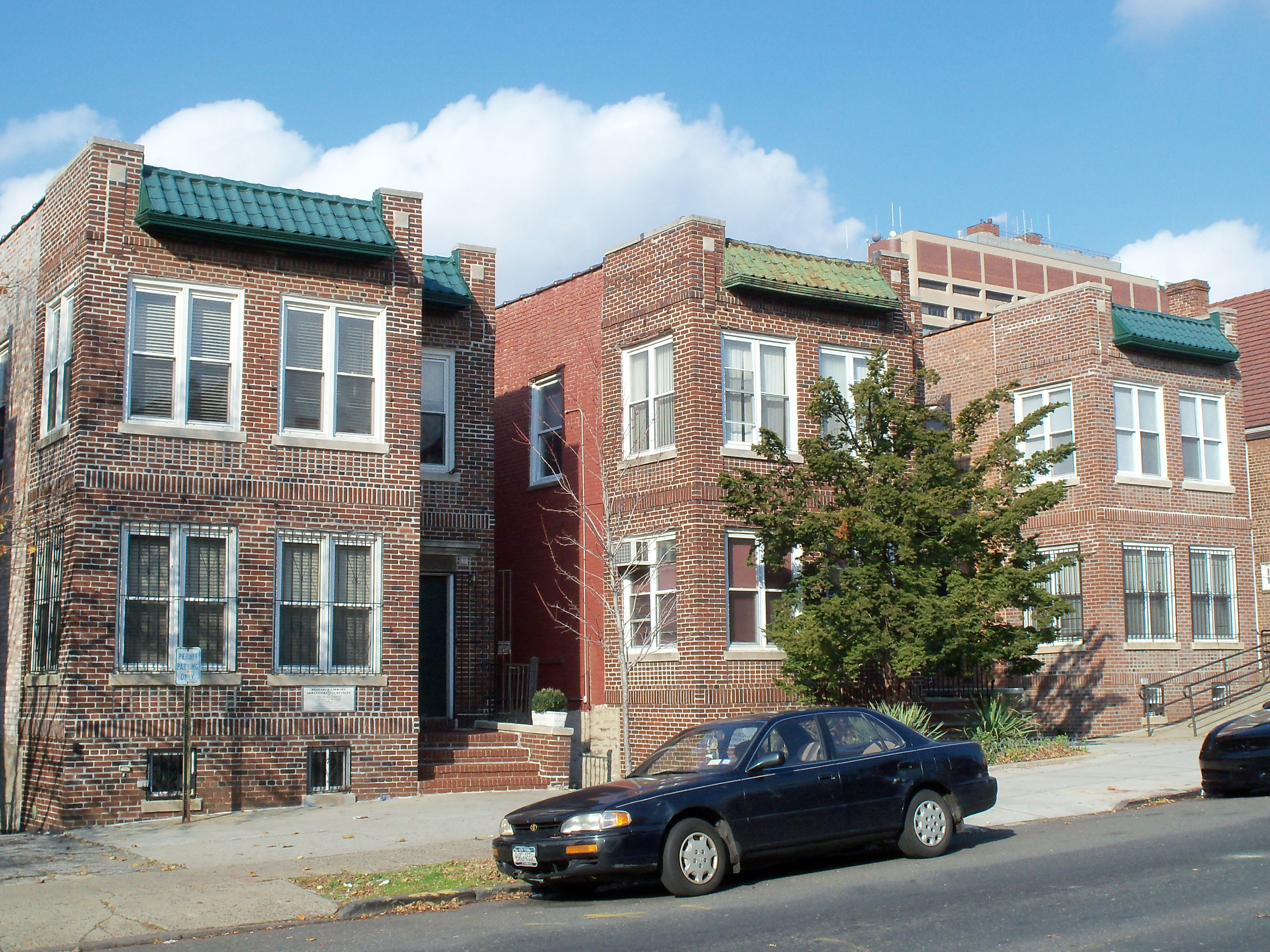
The Bronx County Historical Society Research Library and The Bronx County Archives.

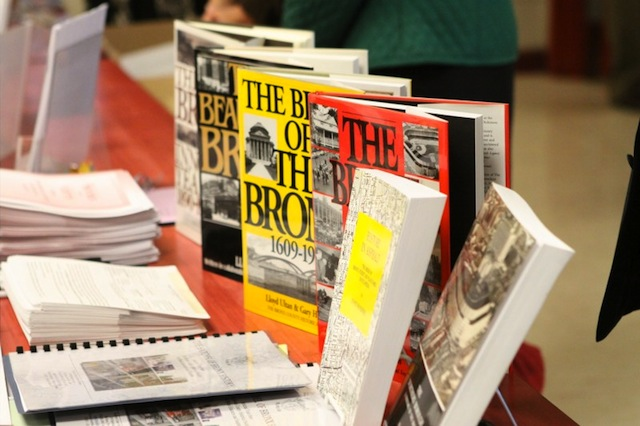
Some of Hermalyn's books on display.

Hermalyn grew up in the Gun Hill-Norwood, Bronx neighborhood. He graduated from The Bronx High School of Science, earned a bachelor's degree from City College of New York, a Master of Arts from Long Island University (1982) and a Doctor of Education from Columbia University (1985).

He has been director, then executive director and is currently CEO of The Bronx County Historical Society. He founded and established the Society's The Bronx County Archives and The Bronx County Historical Society Research Library. He is also a Board Member of the Greater Bridgeport Symphony in Bridgeport, Connecticut and as of 2017 was Vice Chairman of the Board of Trustees of the Discovery Museum and Planetarium in Bridgeport.

Hermalyn is an explorer and a fellow of The Explorers Club.

== Awards ==
- Centennial Historian of New York City, Mayor of New York City, 1998

== Publications ==
=== Books by Hermalyn ===
- The Creation of Morris High School, 1896-1904: the First Public High School in The Bronx. Teachers College, Columbia University, 1985. OCLC 21588736. Dissertation.
- Morris High School and the Creation of the New York City Public High School System. New York City Series. New York: The Bronx County Historical Society, 1995. ISBN 9780941980319.
- Publications of the Bronx County Historical Society: 1955–2000. New York: The Bronx County Historical Society, 1999. OCLC 42303755
- The Study and Writing of History. New York: The Bronx County Historical Society, 2007. ISBN 9780941980500.

=== Books paired with others ===
- The Bronx in the Innocent Years, 1890-1925. The Life in The Bronx Collection. New York: Harper & Row, 1985. Hermalyn and Lloyd Ultan. ISBN 9780060154196. Hermalyn was also project editor.
- The Beautiful Bronx 1920-1950. The Life in The Bronx Collection. New York: Harmony, 1988. Hermalyn and Ultan. ISBN 978-0517548004. Hermalyn was also project editor.
- Landmarks of the Bronx. New York: Bronx County Historical Society, 1989. Hermalyn and Robert Kornfeld. OCLC 21927704.
- The Bronx. It Was Only Yesterday. 1935-1965. The Life in The Bronx Collection. New York: The Bronx County Historical Society, 1992. Hermalyn and Ultan. ISBN 9780941980333. Hermalyn was also project editor.
- The Bronx Cookbook Plastic Comb – 1997. New York: The Bronx County Historical Society, 1997. Hermalyn and Peter Derrick. ISBN 978-0941980371.
- The Birth of the Bronx: 1609 - 1900. The Life in The Bronx Collection Vol. 4. New York: The Bronx County Historical Society, 2000. Hermalyn and Ultan. ISBN 0-941980-38-3. Hermalyn was also project editor.
- Time and the Calendar. New York: History of New York City Project, 2001. Elizabeth Beirne and Hermalyn. ISBN 9780965233163.
- Yankee Stadium: 1923-2008: Images of Baseball. Mount Pleasant, SC: Arcadia Publishing, 2009. Hermalyn and Anthony C. Greene. ISBN 978-1531643256.
- The Bronx. Then & Now. Mount Pleasant, SC: Arcadia Publishing, 2010. Kathleen A. McAuley and Hermalyn. ISBN 978-0738573151.
- A Historical Sketch of the Bronx. New York: The Bronx County Historical Society, 2018. Hermalyn and Ultan. ISBN 0-941980-72-3.
- Hudson's River. New York: The Bronx County Historical Society, 2020. Hermalyn and Sidney Horenstein. ISBN 0-941980-76-6.

=== Books with editing contributions by Hermalyn (selected) ===
- The Encyclopedia of New York City. Hermalyn was a member of the editorial board / associate editor.
- The United States Supreme Court. Ten volume series. Hermalyn was a project editor.
- Roots of The Republic Six. Six volume series. Hermalyn was a project editor.
- Research Library and Bronx Archives. Fifteen volume series. The Bronx County Historical Society. Hermalyn was a project editor.
