= Swedish Cottage Marionette Theatre =

Building in Central Park, New York City

Coordinates: 40.779976°N 73.970215°W

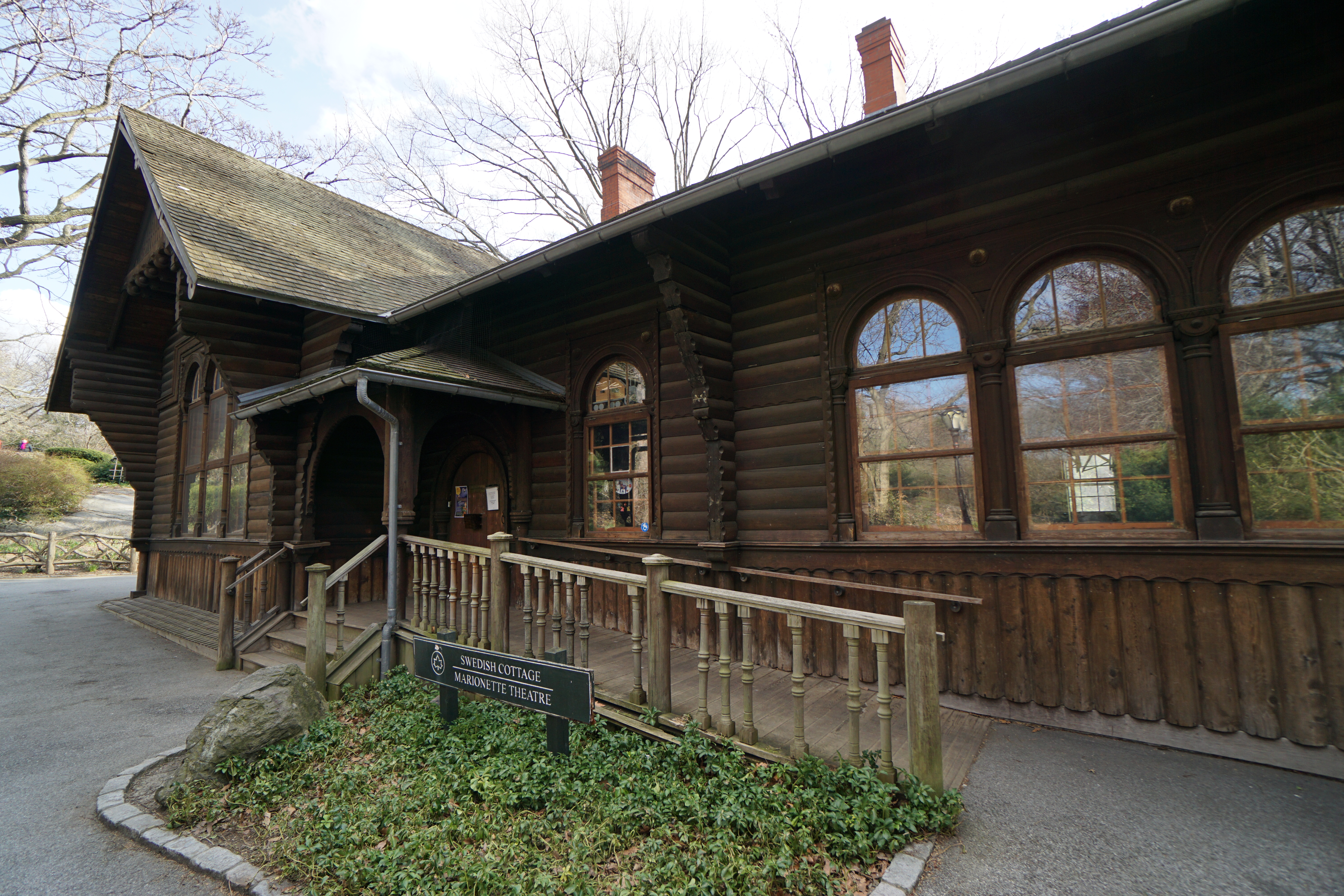
Seen in 2018

Notable buildings and structures of Central Park. Click on the map and then on the points for details.
'"`UNIQ--templatestyles-00000009-QINU`"''"`UNIQ--templatestyles-0000000A-QINU`"'

The Swedish Cottage Marionette Theatre is a building in Central Park, Manhattan, New York City, southeast of the Delacorte Theater near West Drive and 79th Street. It was imported to the U.S. in 1876 as Sweden’s exhibit for the Centennial Exposition in Philadelphia. The Swedish architecture and craftsmanship of the structure, suggestive of a model schoolhouse, caught the eye of Frederick Law Olmsted, who brought it to Central Park in 1877.

Beginning in 1947, the cottage served as the home of a marionette theater troupe that traveled across the city performing on playgrounds and school auditoriums. Under the direction of City Parks Foundation, citywide puppet shows in parks continue to this day through the CityParks PuppetMobile, the oldest continually operating company of its kind in the country, which presents free performances and puppet-making workshops in neighborhood parks, recreation centers and schools throughout New York City.

In 1973 a permanent theater was constructed inside the cottage designed for marionette performances. Since then, hundreds of thousands of children and families from around the world have enjoyed its original marionette productions. The cottage is a member of the Historic House Trust of New York City.

A $10.4 million restoration of the theater was announced in early 2026.

== Marionette performances ==
The Swedish Cottage and its performances are managed and presented by the City Parks Foundation. Master puppet makers and puppeteers create and present the marionette productions, which have included "Hansel and Gretel", "Gulliver's Travels", "Sleeping Beauty", "Alice in Wonderland", "Jack and the Beanstalk", “The Secret History of the Swedish Cottage" and many others.
