= The Bronx County Historical Society =

Nonprofit organization in New York

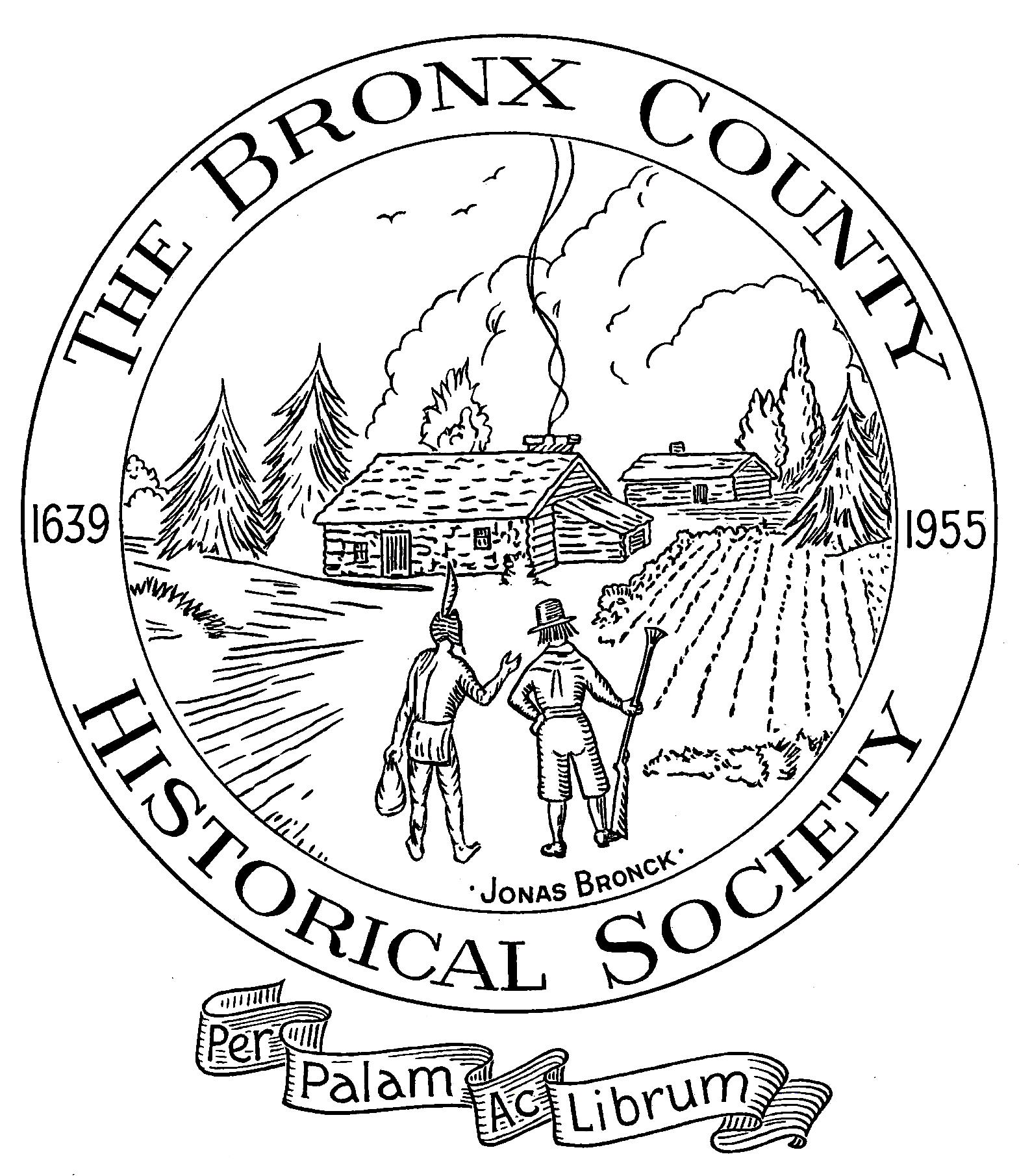
- The seal of The Bronx County Historical Society, which depicts Jonas Bronck and a Native American surveying the Bronck farm "Emmaus" in 1639
- Abbreviation: BCHS
- Named after: County and borough of the Bronx
- Established: 1955; 71 years ago
- Founders: Burt Gumpert, Elizabeth Siedenstein, Joseph Duffy, Sol Elbaum, Theodore Schliessman, Fred E.J. Kracke, John McNamara, Ronald Schliessman, Theodore Kazimiroff, Coralie Doherty, and Vincent Hunt
- Legal status: private, non-profit
- Purpose: educational and cultural
- Headquarters: 3309 Bainbridge Avenue, The Bronx, NY 10467
- Location: Norwood, Bronx, New York City, U.S.
- CEO: Gary Hermalyn
- CAO: Teresa Brown
- Librarian and Archivist: Dr. Steven Payne
- Curator Emerita: Kathleen A. McCauley
- Publication: The Bronx County Historical Society Journal
- Subsidiaries: Museum of Bronx History, Edgar Allan Poe Cottage, The Bronx County Historical Society Research Library, The Bronx County Archives
- Affiliations: Historic House Trust, New York City Department of Parks and Recreation, New York City Department of Cultural Affairs,
- Website: bronxhistoricalsociety.org

The Bronx County Historical Society is a private non-profit organization that collects and disseminates historical material and information about the New York City borough of the Bronx, as well as southern Westchester County, New York.

The Society collects items such as books, reports, photographs, objects, and other artifacts about the Bronx as well as archival records documenting groups and individuals in the borough. It provides information to thousands of people each year through its Research Library and The Bronx County Archives, by mail, over the phone, and via digital communication. The Society also works with the New York Public Library's Bronx Library Center and its branch libraries in sharing these resources. The Bronx County Historical Society is digitizing select portions of its collections.

The Society honors Bronx High School valedictorians with an annual awards ceremony held at the Museum of Bronx History. The Society is also the largest publisher of books and articles about the Bronx and produces The Bronx County Historical Society Journal, the oldest continuously published historical periodical in the New York metropolitan area.

== Partnerships and special projects ==
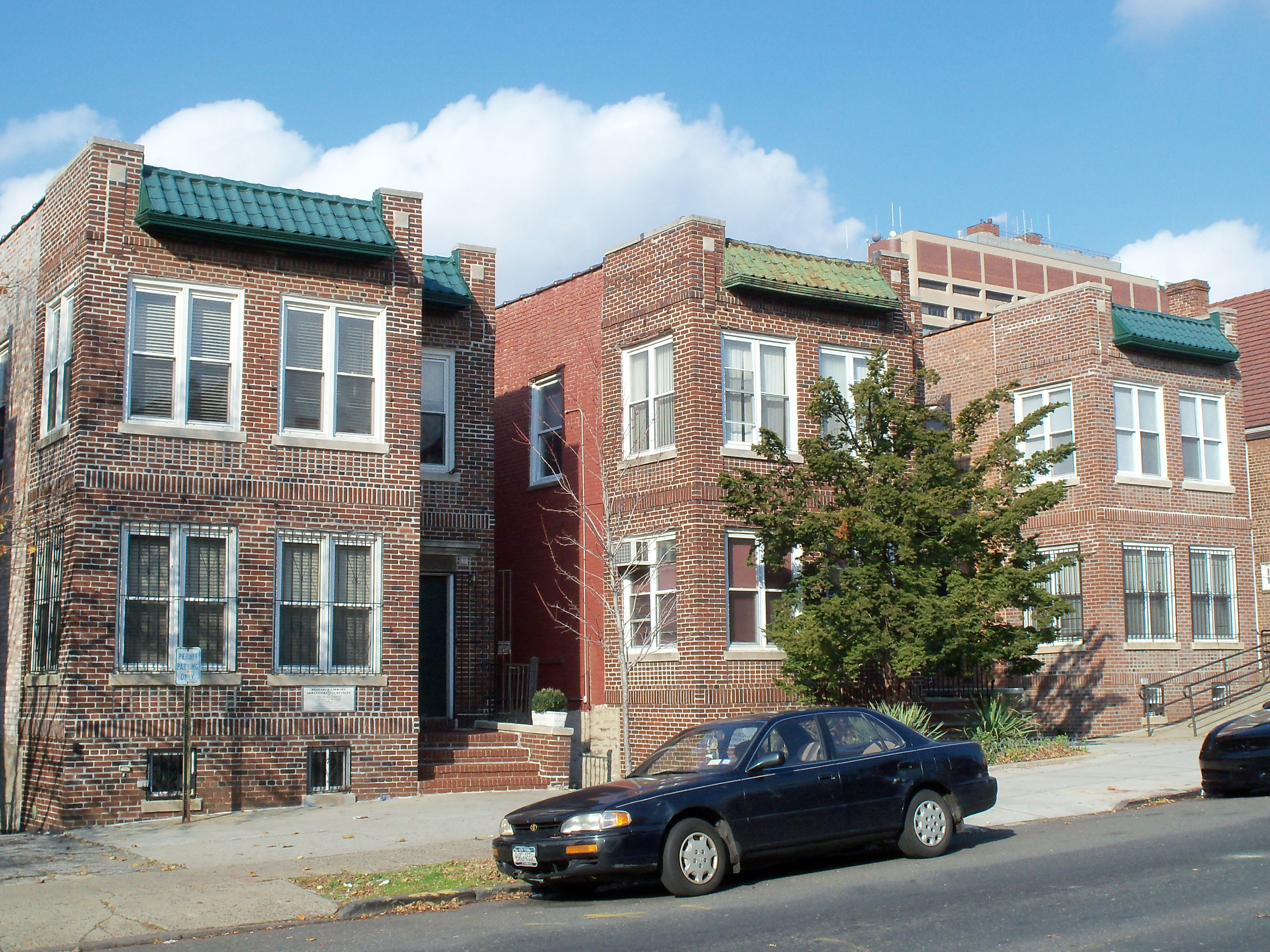
The Bronx County Historical Society's research library at 3309 Bainbridge Avenue (far left) and The Bronx County Archives at 3313 Bainbridge Avenue (far right)

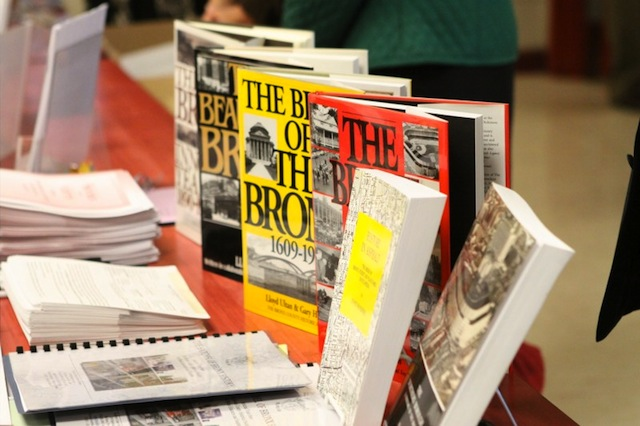
Some of the books published by The Bronx County Historical Society

The Bronx County Historical Society is a joint sponsor with Fordham University's Department of African and African American Studies of the Bronx African American History Project. Over 230 oral histories have been gathered so far, fourteen associated archival collections accessioned, and many books, articles, lectures, musicals, commemorations, and exhibitions have been produced. The oral histories are being cataloged at The Bronx County Archives.

In 2010, the Society launched the Bronx Latino History Project, which highlights Latinos who lived or contributed to the Bronx throughout its history. Because the Latino population is the largest and fastest growing ethnic group in the borough since the mid-20th century (constituting more than half of the county's population), the Society's education department is continuing the process of increasing its collections to reflect the Bronx's ethnic diversity.

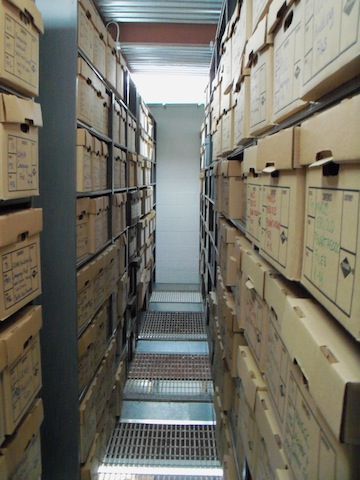
Inside the Bronx County archives

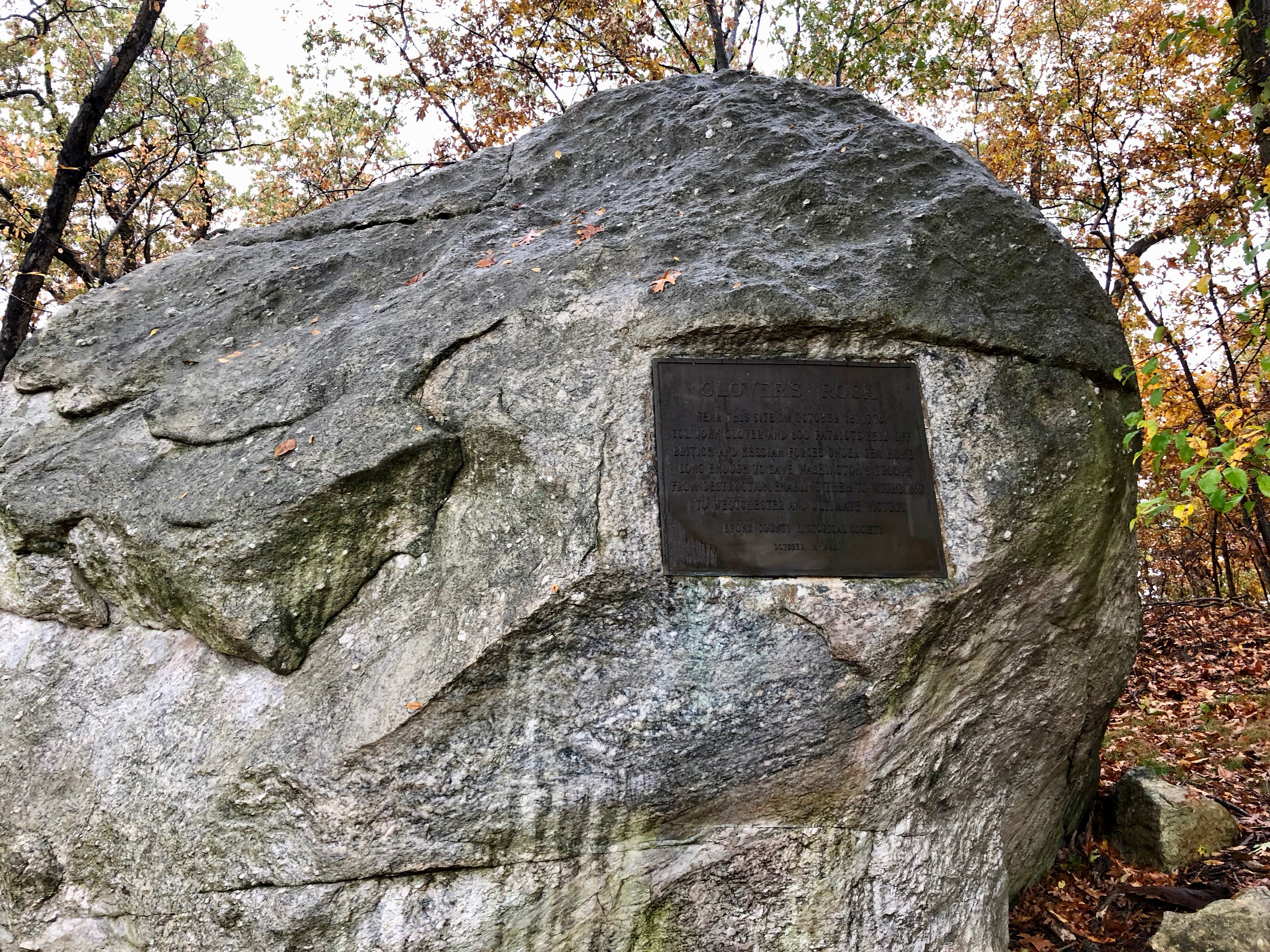
Glover's Rock, Pelham Bay Park: "Near this site on October 12, 1776 Col. John Glover and 600 patriots held off British and Hessian forces under Gen Howe long enough to save Washington's troops from destruction, enabling them to withdraw to Westchester and ultimate victory. Bronx County Historical Society 1960"

== BCHS Research Library ==
The Bronx County Historical Society Research Library is the only facility in New York City solely dedicated to the collection, preservation, and dissemination of the history and heritage of the Bronx. The diverse materials in its collections document the growth and development of the Bronx from its early days as part of Westchester County, through its annexation to the City of Greater New York, and up to the present.

The Research Library houses over 7,000 books, pamphlets, and periodicals, a number of which also exist in digital formats, as well as more than 200 atlases and maps. Its Photograph Collection comprises 75,000 photographs and slides, including 3,000 nineteenth- and early twentieth-century glass negatives; and 1,600 postcards. The Research Library also has a sizable A/V Collection, which contains more than 200 audio cassettes, 300 reel-to-reel tapes, 150 phonograph records, and 200 video cassettes and DVDs. The Research Library's Vertical file collection includes more than 400,000 newspaper clippings and other ephemera on Bronx subjects.

In conjunction with Fordham University, the BCHS research library houses collections of the papers of Jamaal Bowman, Aurelia Greene, Jackie Robinson, and other notable figures associated with the Bronx.

The library received a grant from the National Endowment for the Humanities in 1977 "to research and publish the first comprehensive reference work on the history and heritage of Bronx County."

== The Bronx County Archives ==
The Bronx County Historical Society founded The Bronx County Archives in 1974 to act as a repository for Bronx municipal records. Since that date, The Bronx County Archives have acquired a dedicated building, located next door to The Bronx County Historical Society Research Library, equipped with moisture- and temperature-controlled storage space. The Bronx County Archives currently house 114 individual collections, which comprise around 3205 cubic feet and uniquely document many aspects of Bronx history. These aspects include Bronx businesses and economic development; city planning and infrastructure; civic organizations and clubs; culture and cultural institutions; capital disinvestment and urban devastation; education; healthcare; housing and cooperatives; local history; municipal records; politicians and political parties; and radicalism and community activism. The Bronx County Archives also contain especially rich documentation of Black and Jewish life and culture in the borough. A growing number of archival collections document Latino life and culture in the Bronx as well. As of July 2020, finding aids have been created for the majority of collections and will be provided to researchers upon request.

== National landmark historic houses ==
In addition to the Bronx County Historical Society Research Library and The Bronx County Archives, The Bronx County Historical Society administers two national landmark historic houses, the Edgar Allan Poe Cottage, the home of poet Edgar Allan Poe, and the Valentine–Varian House, a colonial-era farmhouse that hosts the Museum of Bronx History.

== BCHS publications ==
Since its founding in 1955, The Bronx County Historical Society has published, authored, commissioned, and produced popular books, monographs, pamphlets, periodicals, bibliographies, research aids, classroom guides, primary source collections, radio broadcasts, videos, musical performances, and other special interest items on many aspects of Bronx history. In addition, since 1964 the Society has published an annual journal on Bronx history that contains scholarly articles, reminiscences, oral histories, book reviews, and poetry.

Below is a partial list of books and pamphlets published or authored by The Bronx County Historical Society, 1955–2020:

=== Local and regional history ===
1. Beirne, Elizabeth, ed. The Greater New York Centennial. The Bronx, NY: The Bronx County Historical Society and The History of New York City Project, 1999.
2. Beirne, Elizabeth, ed. The Hudson river. The Bronx, NY: The Bronx County Historical Society and The History of New York City Project, 1997.
3. Beirne, Elizabeth, ed. New York City at the Turn of the Century. The Bronx, NY: The Bronx County Historical Society and The History of New York City Project, 1996.
4. De Brino, Nicholas. History of the Morris Park Racecourse and the Morris Family. The Bronx, NY: The Bronx County Historical Society, 1977.
5. Fluhr, George J. The Bronx Through the Years: A Geography and History. New York: The Aidan Press for The Bronx County Historical Society, 1964.
6. Fluhr, George J. The Historical Geography of the West Bronx. The Bronx, NY: The Bronx County Historical Society, 1960.
7. Gilbert, Allan S., ed. The Buried Bronx: Recent Archaeology in the Borough. The Bronx, NY: The Bronx County Historical Society, 1991.
8. Gilbert, Allan S., ed. Digging The Bronx: Recent Archaeology in the Borough. The Bronx, NY: The Bronx County Historical Society, 2018.
9. Hermalyn, G. The Concourse Action Program: The Parks. The Bronx, NY: The Bronx County Historical Society, 1981.
10. Hermalyn, G., and Sidney Horenstein. Hudson's River. The Bronx, NY: The Bronx County Historical Society, 2020.
11. Hermalyn, G. Morris High School and the Creation of The New York City Public High School System. The Bronx, NY: The Bronx County Historical Society, 1995.
12. Hermalyn, G., and Elizabeth Beirne. Time and The Calendar. The Bronx, NY: The Bronx County Historical Society and The History of New York City Project, 2011.
13. Hermalyn, G., and Anthony Greene. Yankee Stadium: 1923–2008, Images of Baseball. Charleston, SC: Arcadia, 2009.
14. Hermalyn, G., and Robert Kornfeld. Landmarks of The Bronx. The Bronx, NY: The Bronx County Historical Society, 1989.
15. Hermalyn, G., and Lloyd Ultan. A Historical Sketch of The Bronx. The Bronx, NY: The Bronx County Historical Society, 2018.
16. Hermalyn, G., and Lloyd Ultan. "The Bronx." Pp. 160–65 in The Encyclopedia of New York City. Second edition. New Haven, CT: Yale University Press, 2010.
17. Lazarus, Douglas, ed. Re-Inspired: The Erie Canal, America's First Great Work of Civil Engineering. The Bronx, NY: The Bronx County Historical Society, 2010.
18. McAuley, Kathleen A. Westchester Town: Bronx Beginnings. The Bronx, NY: The Bronx County Historical Society, 2017.
19. McNamara, John. History in Asphalt: The Origin of Bronx Street and Place Names. Fourth revised edition. Harrison, NY: Harbor Hill Books, 2010.
20. McNamara, John. McNamara's Old Bronx. Bronx, NY: The Bronx County Historical Society, 1989.
21. Mead, Edna. The Bronx Triangle: A Portrait of Norwood. The Bronx, NY: The Bronx County Historical Society, 1982.
22. Mendez, Ruben P. A History of the Riverdale Yacht Club. The Bronx, NY: The Bronx County Historical Society, 2008.
23. Schliessman, Ronald. The Bronx in the World of Books. The Bronx, NY: The Bronx County Historical Society, 1962.
24. Serrano, Alfonso. Latin Bicentennial. The Bronx, NY: The Bronx County Historical Society, n.d.
25. Stelter, Lawrence. By The El: Third Avenue and Its El at Mid-Century. New York: New York Transit Museum and The Bronx, NY: The Bronx County Historical Society, 2007.
26. Ultan, Lloyd. The Beautiful Bronx 1920–1950. New York: Crown Publishers, 1979.
27. Ultan, Lloyd. Blacks in the Colonial Bronx: A Documentary History. The Bronx, NY: The Bronx County Historical Society, 2012.
28. Ultan, Lloyd. The Bronx in the American Revolution. The Bronx, NY: The Bronx County Historical Society, 1975.
29. Ultan, Lloyd. The Bronx in the Frontier Era. The Bronx, NY: The Bronx County Historical Society, 1993.
30. Ultan, Lloyd. Legacy of the Revolution: The Valentine-Varian House. The Bronx, NY: The Bronx County Historical Society, 1980, 1983.
31. Ultan, Lloyd. The Northern Borough: A History of The Bronx. The Bronx, NY: The Bronx County Historical Society, 2009.
32. Ultan, Lloyd, and G. Hermalyn. The Birth of the Bronx. The Bronx, NY: The Bronx County Historical Society, 2000.
33. Ultan, Lloyd, and G. Hermalyn. The Bronx in the Innocent Years, 1890–1925. Revised edition. The Bronx, NY: The Bronx County Historical Society, 1991.
34. Ultan, Lloyd, and G. Hermalyn. The Bronx: It Was Only Yesterday, 1935–1965. The Bronx, NY: The Bronx County Historical Society, 1992.
35. Wolf, Edward. History of the Early Bronx. The Bronx, NY: The Bronx County Historical Society, 1969.

=== Roots of the Republic series ===
1. The Bronx County Historical Society. About the Declaration of Independence: 200 Years of Freedom. The Bronx, NY: The Bronx County Historical Society, 1975.
2. Lankevitch, George. Chief Justices of the United States Supreme Court. The Bronx, NY: The Bronx County Historical Society, 1996.
3. Lankevitch, George. The First House of Representatives/The Bill of Rights. The Bronx, NY: The Bronx County Historical Society, 1996.
4. Quinn, C. Edward, F.S.C. The Signers of the Declaration of Independence. The Bronx, NY: The Bronx County Historical Society, 1988.
5. Quinn, C. Edward, F.S.C. The Signers of the Constitution of the United States. The Bronx, NY: The Bronx County Historical Society, 1987.
6. Streb, Richard. The First Senate of the United States. The Bronx, NY: The Bronx County Historical Society, 1996.
7. Ultan, Lloyd. The Presidents of the United States. The Bronx, NY: The Bronx County Historical Society, 1989.

=== Edgar Allan Poe ===
1. Beirne, Elizabeth, ed. Poems and Tales of Edgar Allan Poe at Fordham. The Bronx, NY: The Bronx County Historical Society, 1999, 2008.
2. The Bronx County Historical Society. Poems of Edgar Allan Poe at Fordham. The Bronx, NY: The Bronx County Historical Society, 1975.
3. McAuley, Kathleen A. Edgar Allan Poe: A Short Biography. The Bronx, NY: The Bronx County Historical Society, 1982.

=== Educational material and primary sources ===
1. The Bronx County Historical Society Education Department. Local History Classroom Resource Guide: Suggested Lessons, Activities and Resources for All Grades. The Bronx, NY: The Bronx County Historical Society, 1994, 2006.
2. The Bronx County Historical Society Education Department. The Satchel of Bronx History: Books for Educations and Students in The Bronx; Selected Texts from The Bronx County Historical Society. The Bronx, NY: The Bronx County Historical Society, 2006.
3. Garrison, Lisa. The South Bronx and the Founding of America: An Activity Book for Teachers and Students. The Bronx, NY: The Bronx County Historical Society, 1987.
4. Greene, Anthony C. Annotated Primary Source Documents from the Collections of The Bronx County Historical Society. The Bronx, NY: The Bronx County Historical Society, 2007.
5. Greene, Anthony C., and Kathleen A. McAuley. Edgar Allan Poe at Fordham: An Educator's Guide, Elementary School Edition. The Bronx, NY: The Bronx County Historical Society, 2006.
6. Hermalyn, G. The Study and Writing of History. The Bronx, NY: The Bronx County Historical Society, 2007.
7. Hopkins, Samuel R. West Farms Local History Curriculum Guide. The Bronx, NY: The Bronx County Historical Society, 1995.
8. McAuley, Kathleen A. Edgar Allan Poe at Fordham: A Teacher's Guide and Workbook. The Bronx, NY: The Bronx County Historical Society, 1988.

=== Reference material and bibliographies ===
1. Butler, Janet. Genealogy in The Bronx: An Annotated Resource Guide to Sources of Information. The Bronx, NY: The Bronx County Historical Society, 1983.
2. Hermalyn, G. Education and Culture in The Bronx: A Research Guide. The Bronx, NY: The Bronx County Historical Society, 2013.
3. Nico, Elizabeth, and Laura Tosi. Ethnic Groups in The Bronx: Selected Bibliographies From the Collections of The Bronx County Historical Society. Edited by G. Hermalyn. The Bronx, NY: The Bronx County Historical Society, 2014.
4. Rodríguez, Narcisco, and Candace Kuhta, eds. The Bronx in Print. First edition. The Bronx, NY: The Bronx County Historical Society, 1981, 2006.
5. Sgambettera, Mark, and Domenick Caldiero. Newspaper Titles of The Bronx. The Bronx, NY: The Bronx County Historical Society, 2007.
6. Tosi, Laura. Democratic Bronx County Leaders Since 1914. The Bronx, NY: The Bronx County Historical Society, 1995.
7. Tosi, Laura, and G. Hermalyn. Elected Public Officials of The Bronx Since 1898. The Bronx, NY: The Bronx County Historical Society, 2014.
8. Tosi, Laura. Republican Bronx County Leaders Since 1914. The Bronx, NY: The Bronx County Historical Society, 1995.

=== The Bronx County Historical Society Journal ===
1. The Bronx County Historical Society. The Bronx County Historical Society Journal, vols. 1–56. The Bronx, NY: The Bronx County Historical Society, 1964–2019.
2. The Bronx County Historical Society. 25 Year Index: The Bronx County Historical Society Journal, 1964–1988. The Bronx, NY: The Bronx County Historical Society, 1991.
3. Tosi, Laura, ed. Index to Article Titles and Contributing Authors of The Bronx County Historical Society Journal, 1964–2007. The Bronx, NY: The Bronx County Historical Society, 2007.
4. Tosi, Laura, Elizabeth Nico, and Steven Payne, eds. Index to Article Titles and Contributing Authors of The Bronx County Historical Society Journal, 1964–2018. The Bronx, NY: The Bronx County Historical Society, 2020.

=== Collections Guides ===
1. Sartain, Dorothea, and Peter Derrick. Guide to the Collections of The Bronx County Archives, The Bronx County Historical Society. First edition. The Bronx, NY: The Bronx County Historical Society, 2006.
2. Sartain, Dorothea, Peter Derrick, and Kathleen A. McAuley. Guide to the Collections of The Bronx County Archives, The Bronx County Historical Society. Second edition. The Bronx, NY: The Bronx County Historical Society, 2017.
3. Tosi, Laura, and G. Hermalyn. Guide to The Bronx County Historical Society Media Collection. The Bronx, NY: The Bronx County Historical Society, 2008.
4. Tosi, Laura. Index to the Atlas Collection of The Bronx County Historical Society, 1869–1969. The Bronx, NY: The Bronx County Historical Society, 2003.
5. Tosi, Laura, Mark Sgambettera, and G. Hermalyn. Index to The Sheet Map Collection of The Bronx County Historical Society. The Bronx, NY: The Bronx County Historical Society, 2007.
6. Tosi, Laura, and G. Hermalyn. Microfilm and Microfiche Collection of The Bronx County Historical Society Research Library. The Bronx, NY: The Bronx County Historical Society, 2005.
7. Tosi, Laura, and G. Hermalyn. Videotape Collection of The Bronx County Historical Society. The Bronx, NY: The Bronx County Historical Society, 2004.
8. Tosi, Laura, and G. Hermalyn. Audio Collection of The Bronx County Historical Society. The Bronx, NY: The Bronx County Historical Society, 2001.

=== Media ===
1. Bronx Faces and Places: Edgar Allan Poe and His Cottage. New York City Board of Education District 10 and The Bronx County Historical Society, 1987.
2. Bronx Faces and Places: Marble Hill. New York City Board of Education District 10 and The Bronx County Historical Society, 1985.
3. Bronx Faces and Places: Rosa Comes to The Bronx/350th Anniversary of The Bronx. New York City Board of Education District 10 and The Bronx County Historical Society, 1989.
4. Bronx Faces and Places: Valentine-Varian House. New York City Board of Education District 10 and The Bronx County Historical Society, 1986.
5. Edgar Allan Poe Cottage. BronxNet, Bronx Tourism Council, and The Bronx County Historical Society, 2010.
6. Currie, Russell, composer. The Cask of Amontillado. 1978.
7. Currie, Russell, composer. Song Cycle of Poe's Poems. 2010.
8. Hermalyn, G., and Lloyd Ultan. Out of the Past. New York: WFUV, 90.7 FM, 1974–1991.

=== Special interest ===
1. Derrick, Peter, and G. Hermalyn. The Bronx Cookbook. The Bronx, NY: The Bronx County Historical Society, 1997.
2. Hermalyn, G. Bronx Views: 24 Ready-to-Mail Vintage Post Cards. The Bronx, NY: The Bronx County Historical Society, 2003.

== Official historians of the Bronx ==
The official historian of the Bronx, though independently appointed, is traditionally headquartered at The Bronx County Historical Society.

- Ángel Hérnandez (2023–present)
- Lloyd Ultan (1996–2023)
- William A. Tieck (1989–1996)
- Theodore Kazimiroff
- Cyrus C. Miller

== See also ==
- Gary Hermalyn — CEO of the Bronx County Historical Society.
- Mark D. Naison — The Bronx African American History Project.
- List of historical societies in New York (state)
