= Edgar Allan Poe Cottage =

Historic house in the Bronx, New York

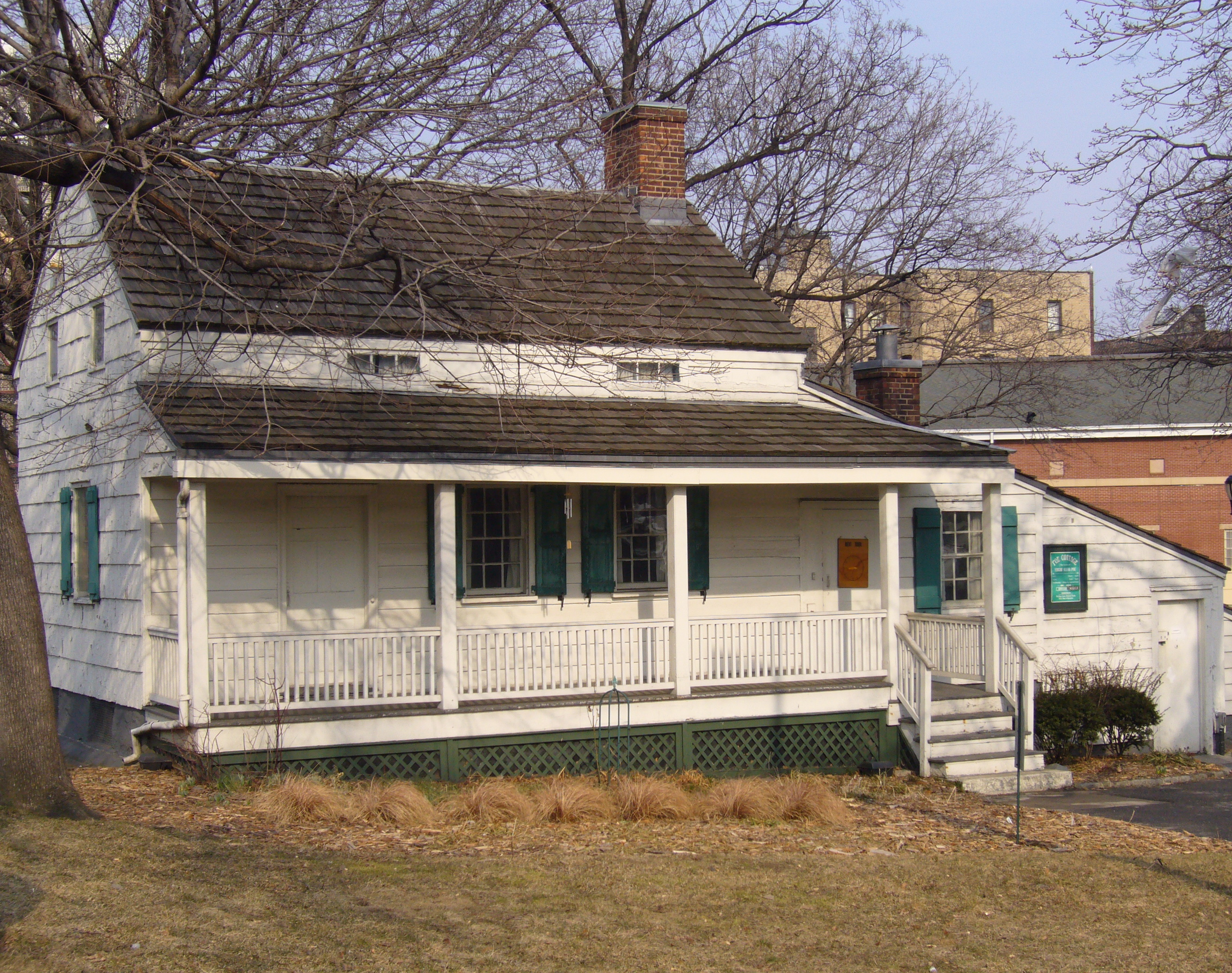
- Seen in March 2007
- Location: 2640 Grand Concourse, Fordham, Bronx, NY
- Coordinates: 40°51′55″N 73°53′40″W
- Type: Historic house museum
- Public transit access: New York City Subway: at Kingsbridge Road; at Kingsbridge Road; New York City Bus: Bx1, Bx2, Bx9, Bx10, Bx22, Bx28, Bx34, BxM4; Metro-North Railroad: Harlem Line at Fordham
- Website: bronxhistoricalsociety.org/poe-cottage/; www.nycgovparks.org/parks/poe-park/monuments/1194
- Poe Cottage
- U.S. National Register of Historic Places
- New York City Landmark
- Location within New York City Location within New York Location within the United States
- Area: 3 acres (1.2 ha)
- Built: 1812
- Architect: John Wheeler
- NRHP reference No.: 80002588
- NYCL No.: 0110

Significant dates
- Added to NRHP: August 19, 1980
- Designated NYCL: February 15, 1966

The Edgar Allan Poe Cottage (or Poe Cottage) is the former home of American writer Edgar Allan Poe. It is located near the intersection of Kingsbridge Road and the Grand Concourse in the Fordham neighborhood of the Bronx in New York City. The house is believed to have been built in 1797. In 1913, it was relocated a short distance from its original location, and is now in the northern part of Poe Park.

The cottage is part of the Historic House Trust, listed on the National Register of Historic Places, and has been administered by the Bronx County Historical Society since 1975.

== History ==
=== Poe family years ===
The Poe family—which included Edgar, his wife Virginia Clemm, and her mother Maria—moved in around May 1846 after living for a short time in Turtle Bay, Manhattan. At the time, Fordham was not yet a part of the Bronx and the rural community had only recently been connected to the city by rail. The cottage, which was then on Kingsbridge Road to the east of its intersection with Valentine Avenue, was small and simple: it had on its first floor a sitting room and kitchen and its unheated second floor had a bedroom and Poe's study. On the front porch, the family kept caged songbirds. The home sat on 2 acres (8,100 m^{2}) of land, and Poe paid either $5 rent per month or $100 per year. Its owner, John Valentine, had bought it from a man named Richard Corsa on March 28, 1846, for $1000.

Despite its small size and minimal furnishings, the family seemed to enjoy the home. "The cottage is very humble", a visitor said, "you wouldn't have thought decent people could have lived in it; but there was an air of refinement about everything." A friend of Poe's years later wrote: "The cottage had an air of taste and gentility... So neat, so poor, so unfurnished, and yet so charming a dwelling I never saw." In a letter to a friend, Poe himself wrote: "The place is a beautiful one." Maria wrote years later: "It was the sweetest little cottage imaginable. Oh, how supremely happy we were in our dear cottage home!" Poe's final short story, "Landor's Cottage", was likely inspired by the home.

In this home, Poe wrote his poems "Annabel Lee" and "Ulalume" while the family cat sat on his shoulder. During his time here, he also published his series on "The Literati of New York City", controversial gossip-like discussions of literary figures and their work, including Nathaniel Parker Willis, Charles Frederick Briggs, Thomas Dunn English, Margaret Fuller, and Lewis Gaylord Clark. As their publisher Louis Antoine Godey announced in his Lady's Book, they would soon "raise some commotion in the literary emporium."

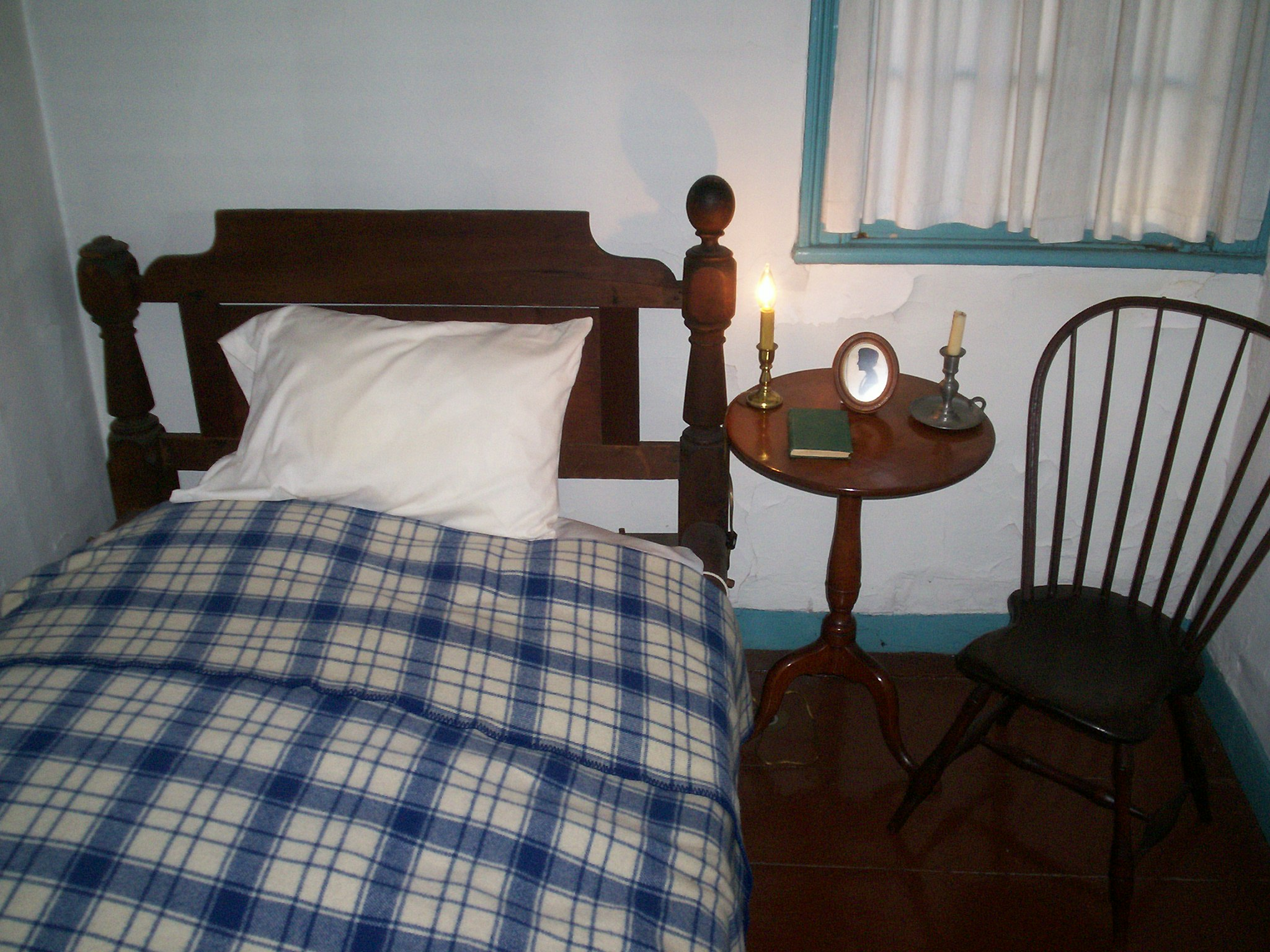
Virginia Poe's bed

The Poe family befriended their neighbors, including the family of John Valentine, and Poe even served as a sponsor for baptism for one of the local boys (who was named "Edgar Albert"). Poe also became friendly with the faculty at what was then St. John's College, now Fordham University. He found the Jesuit faculty to be "highly cultivated gentlemen and scholars [who] smoked, drank, and played cards like gentleman, and never said a word about religion." The college's church bells inspired his poem "The Bells".

During the Poe family's time in the cottage, Virginia struggled with tuberculosis. Family friend Mary Gove Nichols wrote: "One felt that she was almost a disrobed spirit, and when she coughed it was made certain that she was rapidly passing away." Virginia died in the cottage's first-floor bedroom on January 30, 1847. She was buried in the vault of the Valentine family on February 2. Poe died a couple of years later on October 7, 1849, while in Baltimore. At Fordham, Maria did not hear of his death until October 9, after he was already buried. Shortly thereafter, she moved out of the cottage to live with a family in Brooklyn for a time.

=== Relocation ===
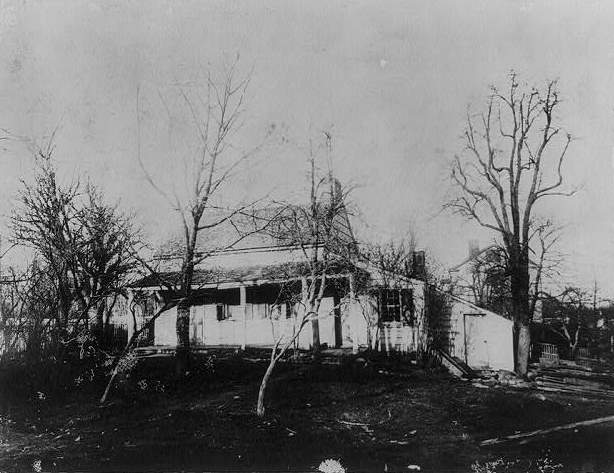
The cottage was originally located on Kingsbridge Road before it was moved to its current location in Poe Park in 1913.

The cottage's immediate use following the Poe family is uncertain; however, it was reportedly occupied by an 'old southern lady'. In 1874, an article by M. J. Lamb published in Appletons’ Journal described a pilgrimage to the site and noted the cottage was "dreadfully out of repair". The cottage was sold at auction in 1889 for $775 to William Fearing Gill in the first step of preservation after the Parks Department found it to be too expensive a proposition with rent approximately four times what Poe paid. Gill would later become Poe's first American biographer.

In 1895, the New York Shakespeare Society purchased the Cottage for use as a headquarters with the promise that it would be maintained in the condition in which Poe used it. However, concerns about any move of the cottage sprung up almost immediately. An article titled "Shall We Save the Poe Cottage at Fordham" was published in the Review of Reviews in 1896, urging the New York State Legislature to act on preserving the home with endorsements from Theodore Roosevelt, Hamlin Garland, William Dean Howells, Rudyard Kipling, Thomas Wentworth Higginson, Henry Cabot Lodge, Horace Scudder and others.

In 1905, it was announced that $100,000 had been authorized by the state legislature for the restoration of the cottage and creation of a park in which to house the cottage after the owners were reported to be denying visitors access to the cottage. The restoration and park creation were not without complaint, and many felt the money would be better spent on other ventures and further that the cottage's authenticity would be lost if it were to be moved. The decision to move was finally made in 1910 and on November 13, 1913, Poe Cottage in Poe Park was dedicated at the corner of Kingsbridge Road and the Grand Concourse. In 1922, further reconstruction was undertaken by the New York Historical Society to restore the cottage to its original condition.

=== Recent history ===
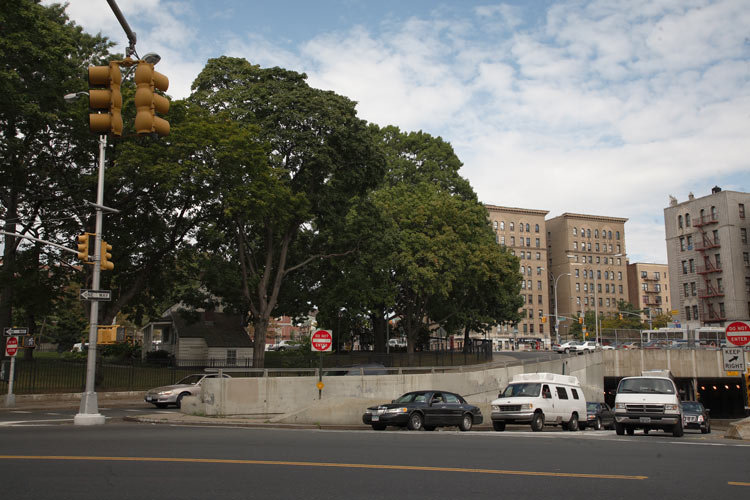
Poe Park and Kingsbridge Road today

In 1962, Poe's Cottage was designated a Bronx landmark, and in 1966 it was recognized by the New York City Landmarks Preservation Commission as an official city landmark. In 1974 vandals struck, as in the past, leading to further criticism of the Cottage's management and preservation efforts.

Vandalism continued to occur over the next few years, though it tapered off by the end of the following decade, becoming less of a risk due in part to the increased use of live-in caretakers. In the late 1990s, the cottage was under the care of a graduate student in philology who lived in the basement.

In 2007, the proposed Visitors Center for the Cottage and Bronx Historical Society in Poe Park was honored by the New York City Art Commission's 2007 Design Awards. The visitor center, designed by Toshiko Mori, opened in 2008 and was the first NYC Parks project completed under mayor Michael Bloomberg's Design and Construction Excellence Initiative.

== See also ==
- Edgar Allan Poe Museum in Richmond, Virginia
- Edgar Allan Poe House and Museum in Baltimore, Maryland
- Edgar Allan Poe National Historic Site in Philadelphia, Pennsylvania
- List of museums and cultural institutions in New York City
- List of New York City Designated Landmarks in the Bronx
- National Register of Historic Places listings in the Bronx
