= New York Sign Museum =

Museum in Brooklyn, New York

The New York Sign Museum
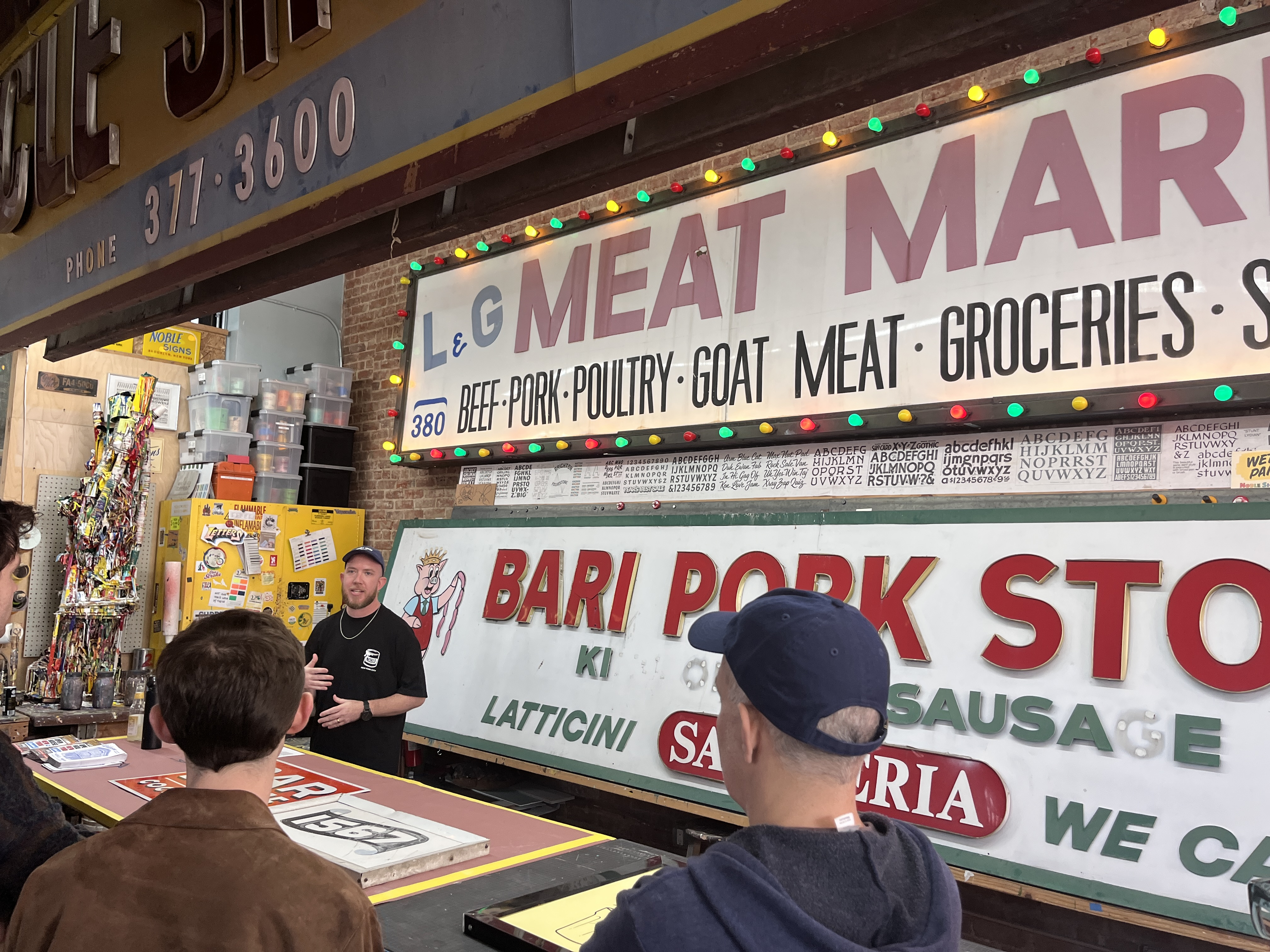
- Mac Pohanka speaking at the museum in 2025.

- Location in New York City
- Established: 2019
- Location: 2465 Atlantic Avenue, Brooklyn, NY, 11207
- Coordinates: 40.6762°N 73.9033°W
- Type: Local museum
- Founder: David Barnett
- Public transit access: Subway: at Broadway Junction station Bus: B25, B20, B83, Q24, Q56
- Website: nysignmuseum.org

The New York Sign Museum is a museum founded in 2019 which preserves signs and advertising from New York City and the surrounding region. It is located in East New York.

== History ==
David Barnett founded Noble Signs in 2013, a workshop which creates new signs for New York City businesses in the style of old iconic city signage (simple block text, extremely product-forward). In 2019, he, along with Noble Signs cofounder Mac Pohanka, started the Sign Museum in the same space, with a mission to save iconic signs from across the city that would otherwise be lost when their business closed. As of 2025, around 215 signs have been preserved from around Manhattan, Brooklyn, Queens, New Jersey, and Long Island.

== Collection ==
The NYSM includes the famous "Queen" sign from the Italian restaurant at 84 Court Street, Brooklyn, rumored to be a meeting place for police officers and mobsters. It also includes signs from Swan Piano Co. in Sunnyside; H. Goodman Furs, from Forest Hills; the facade of Jones Surgical Co; and Smith's Bar from Hell's Kitchen.

In addition to signs, the museum also includes other advertising material: matchbooks, thermometers, calendars, and over 400 shopping bags. Collecting and showcasing these items, Barnett says, is part of reclaiming and preserving the visual language specific to New York City, "as opposed to the same corporate stuff that could be in any city in the world."

Tours of the museum are available on Fridays and Sundays. The museum is also open to visitors as part of Open House New York.

== Gallery ==
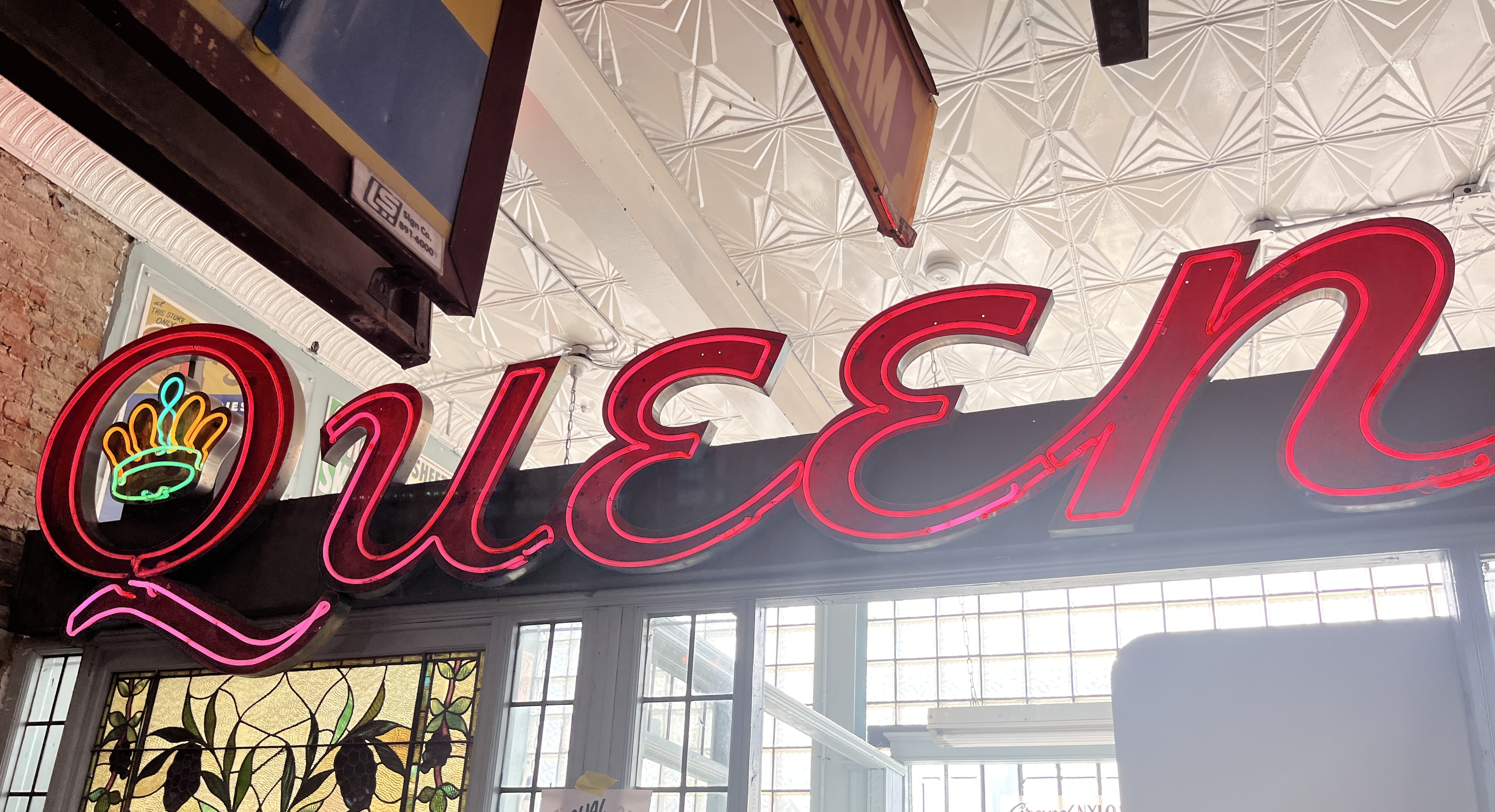
The iconic sign of Queen restaurant in Brooklyn.

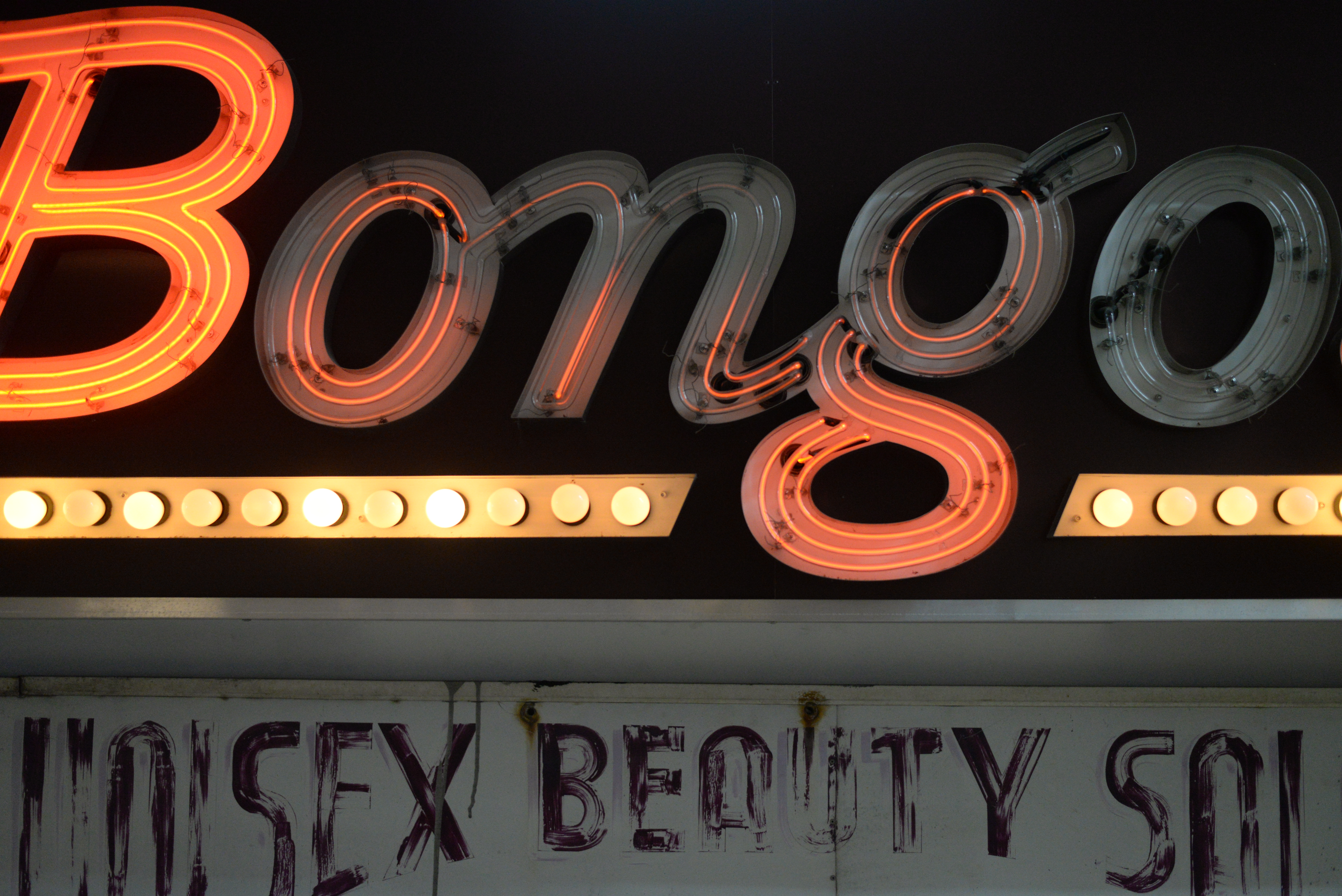
A can neon sign for 'Bongos'.

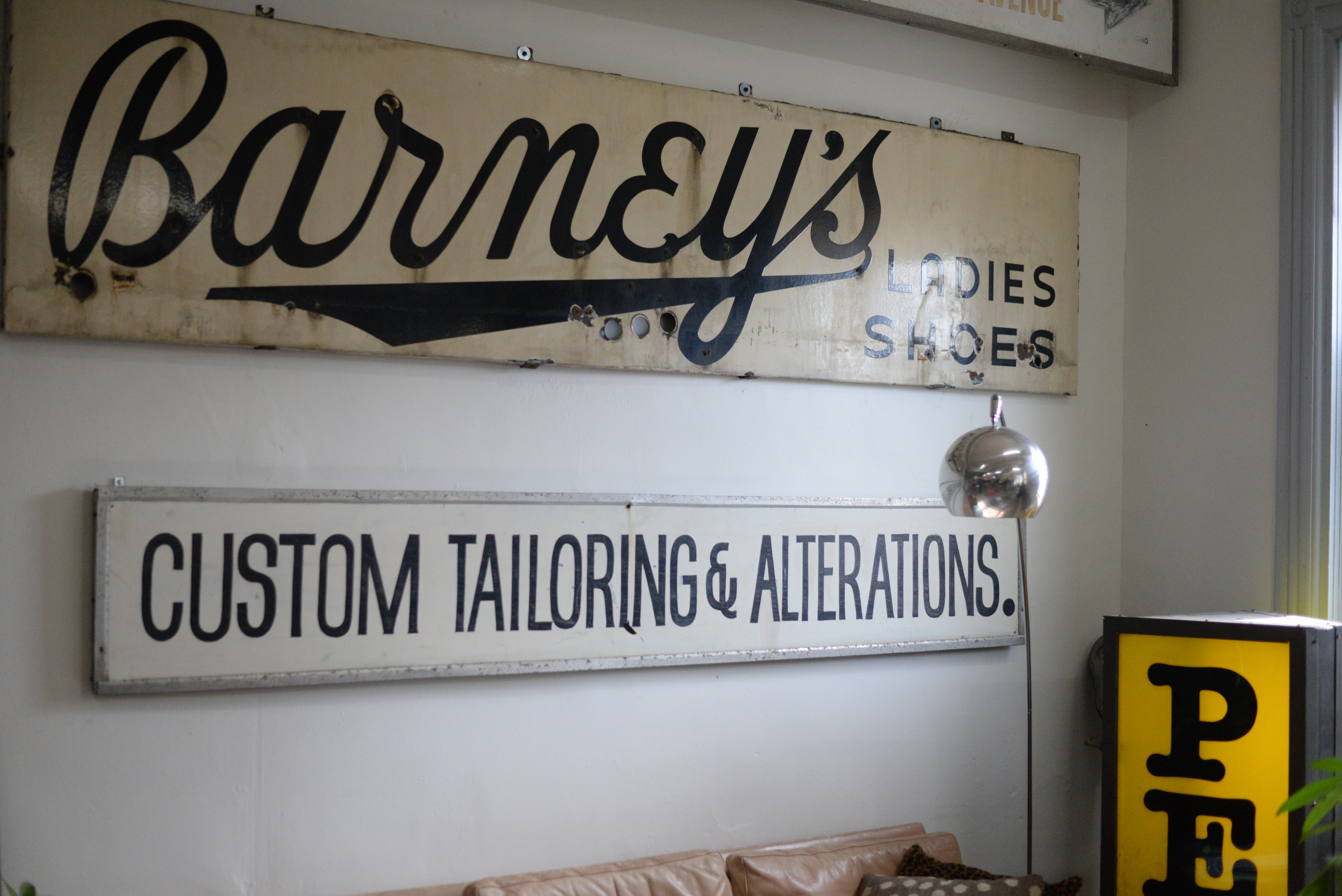
Two signs for Barney's Custom Tailoring and Alterations.

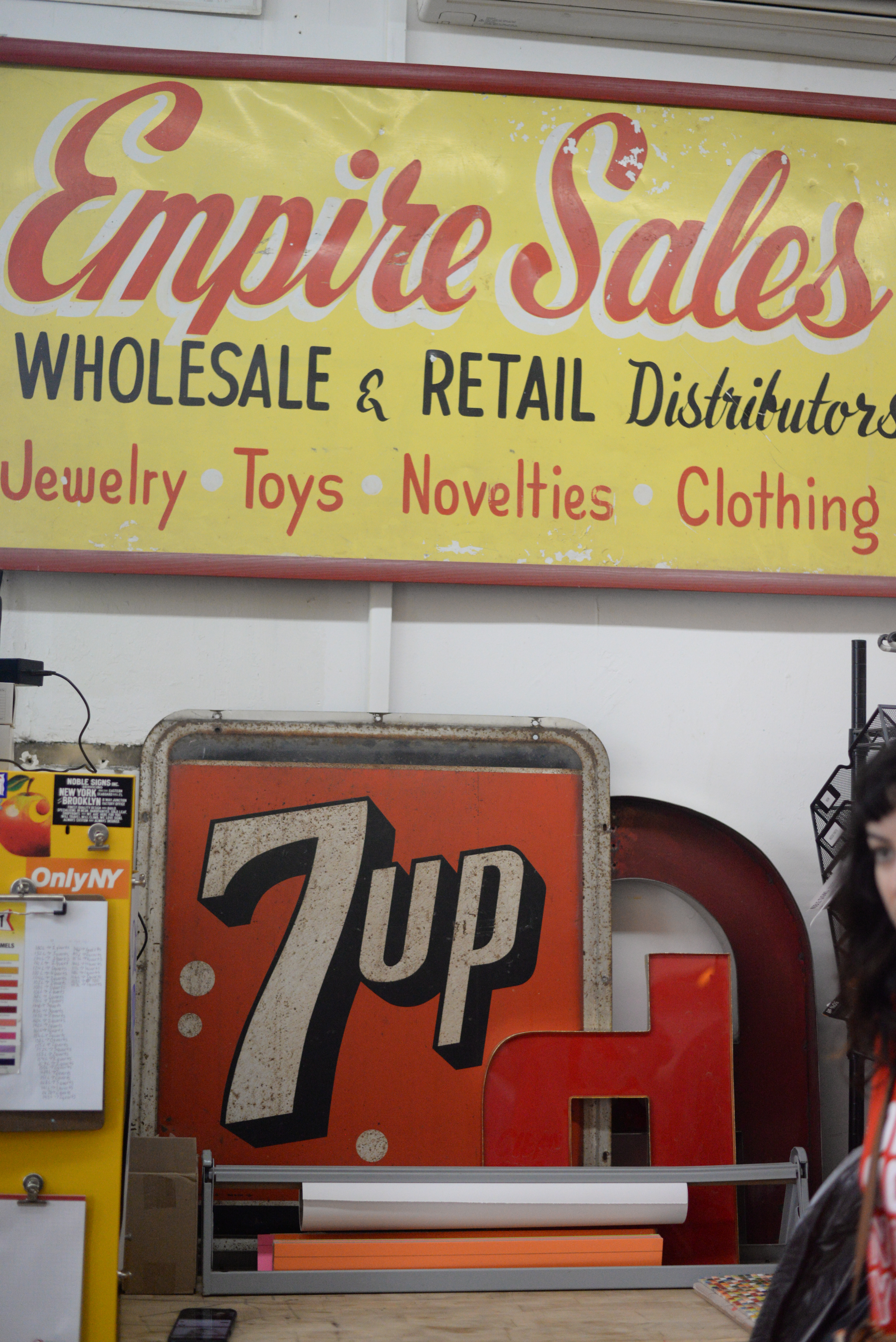
An old 7up sign beneath an Empire Sales advertisement.
