= Brooklyn Seltzer Museum =

Museum in Brooklyn, New York

- A seltzer bottling machine used at the museum

- Location in New York City
- Established: 2023
- Coordinates: 40.6778°N 73.8699°W
- Type: Local museum
- Founders: Alex Gomberg; Barry Joseph
- President: Gregory Cohen
- Public transit access: Subway: at Euclid Avenue station Bus: B13
- Website: brooklynseltzermuseum.org

The Brooklyn Seltzer Museum is a museum focused on the process of making and bottling seltzer, as well as the history of the drink. The museum was founded in 2023, and is located in Cypress Hills, East New York, Brooklyn.

== History ==
The museum is hosted within Brooklyn Seltzer Boys, the oldest seltzer works remaining in New York City. Originally founded in 1953 as Gomberg Seltzer Works, the factory moved to its current space in 2020 after resuming seltzer delivery service.

In 2022, NYU professor Barry Joseph visited the factory, and worked with the owner Alex Gomberg to turn part of the space into a museum. The exhibits, posters, and mascots were designed in 2023 by graduate students from NYU and Teachers College. Another cohort of graduate students added a comic wall, scavenger hunt, and capsule machine to the museum in 2024.

== Exhibits ==
Hand seltzer-bottling machines

The museum features displays, videos, and 3D models of the machines used in the seltzer works: the filtration system which strains tap water through sand, charcoal, and paper, the carbonator, and several types of bottling machines. Its collection also includes vintage seltzer bottles from around the United States, and a station for visitors to spray seltzer from a bottle themselves.

Posters on the wall show off the history of seltzer water, from the first mentions in Ancient Greece to its significance among the Jewish communities of New York City. The museum also features a pair of mascots, anthropomorphic siphon bottles "Spritz" and "Lil' Spritz".

== Events ==
The museum hosts an annual Egg Cream Invitational, a competition for soda fountains and restaurants from around the US to make the best egg cream. It is open to visitors as part of Open House New York.
