= Valentine–Varian House =

Historic house in the Bronx, New York

- U.S. National Register of Historic Places
- New York City Landmark
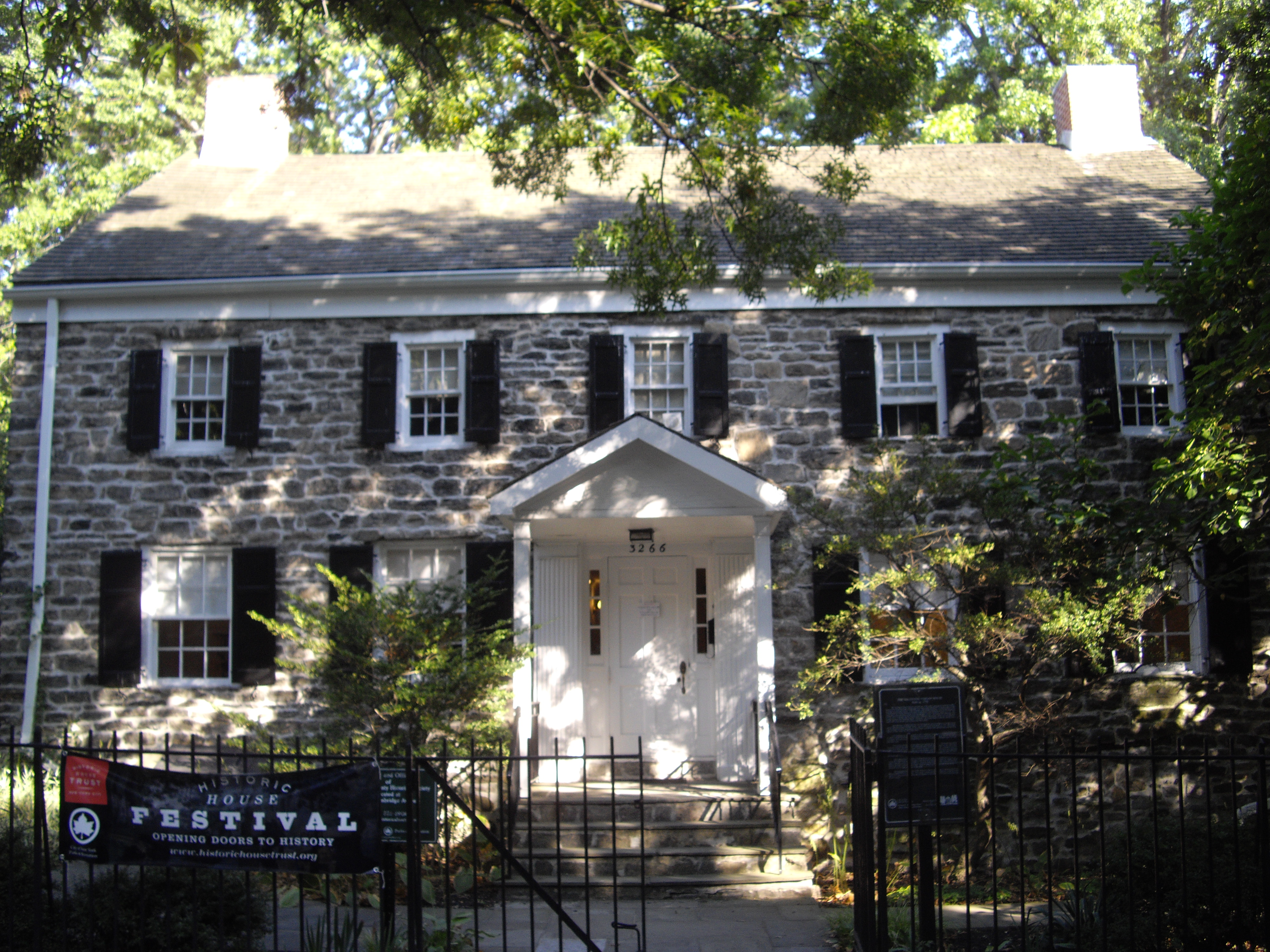
- Valentine–Varian House, September 2008

- Location within New York City Location within New York Location within the United States
- Location: 3266 Bainbridge Avenue, Norwood, Bronx, New York 10467
- Coordinates: 40°52′38.6″N 73°52′46″W
- Built: 1758
- NRHP reference No.: 78001841
- NYCL No.: 0119

Significant dates
- Added to NRHP: March 21, 1978
- Designated NYCL: March 15, 1966

The Valentine–Varian House is a historic house located in the Norwood neighborhood of the Bronx, New York City. Built in 1758 by Isaac Valentine, it is the Bronx's second oldest house and oldest remaining farmhouse. The house remained in the Varian family, which included Isaac Varian, the 63rd Mayor of New York City until 1905, when it was sold. It is currently a part of the Historic House Trust and houses the Museum of Bronx History and the offices of the Bronx County Historical Society. It is a two-story, five bay fieldstone residence with a gable roof. It was moved to its present site in 1965 and restored between July 1965 and May 1968.

== History ==
This structure, the second oldest house in the Bronx, was built by Isaac Valentine, a prosperous blacksmith and farmer from Yonkers in 1758. It was built out of nearby natural resources such as pine trees for interior flooring and stone for the exterior walls.

During the American Revolutionary War, the House was occupied by Hessian, British and American troops and survived the war despite a series of battles fought nearby. The British captured this house in 1776 and held British troops as George Washington was stationed in the nearby Van Cortlandt House. This house then became the scene of frequent conflict between British and American troops. Isaac Valentine often encountered unwelcomed visitors since the 3rd Amendment (no soldier shall, in time of peace, be quartered in any house without the consent of the owner) was not established. Nevertheless, George Washington used the Valentine–Varian House as a strategic location to defeat the British. The house is situated on Bainbridge Avenue The colonists used this highest point of the east end in the Bronx overlooking the Boston Post Road and gathered at the top of the hill to fire a cannon against the British who were at the bottom of the hill, hence its name. The house's role in the Revolutionary War was documented in a book published in 1983.

After the Revolutionary War, Isaac Valentine faced bankruptcy due to the rising inflation as the nation attempted to establish an economy with their newfound independence. The Hessian fly was also a contributor to Isaac Valentine's financial ruin where wheat crops were blighted in southeastern New York. As urbanization outpaced his farming techniques, Isaac Valentine sold his house to the wealthy Isaac Varian and his family in 1792.

=== Preservation ===
It was moved to its present site in 1965 and restored between July 1965 and May 1968. The house withstood significant vandalism in the 1960s when it was being converted for use into a museum. Since its conversion to a museum it has held a number of exhibits about the Bronx and the borough's history.

The Bronx's decline in the late 20th century garnered the attention of president Jimmy Carter, leading to increased state funding for preservation of the borough. Additionally, Isaac Varian handed down the house to his son, Isaac L. Varian, who was a Democratic New York state legislature and held office as the 63rd mayor of New York City (1839–1841).

== Past to present changes ==
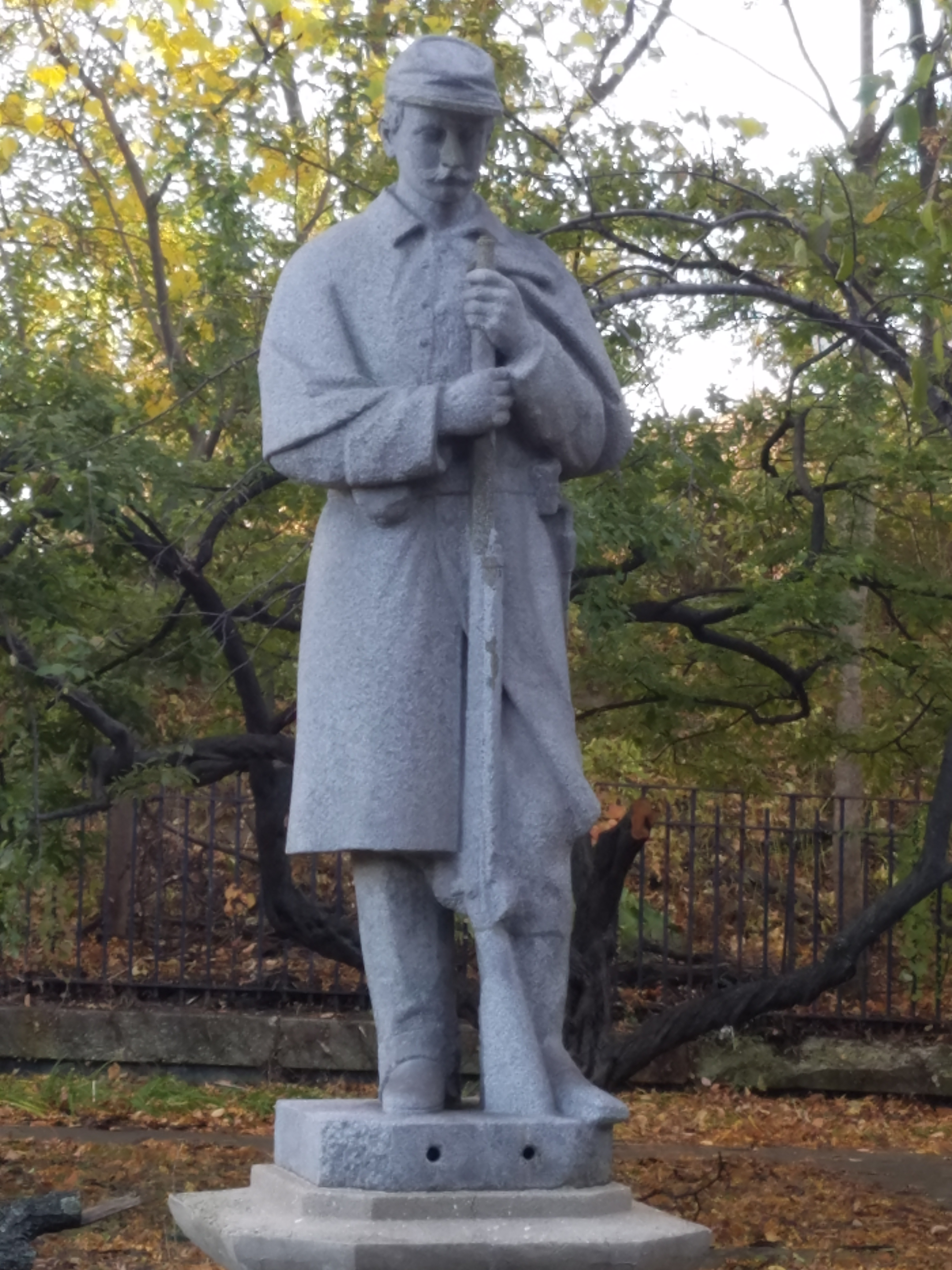
Civil War statue

The house is located on 3266 Bainbridge Avenue, often sticking out as a suburban house that does not fit into the urban landscape. This is due to the house maintaining its Georgian style architecture while the Bronx underwent urbanization. The Valentine–Varian House is preserved by the New York City Department of Parks and Recreation and facilitated through the Bronx County Historical Society. The house was originally across the street from its current address, but apartment buildings now occupy its initial location. Within the house, it serves as a museum to illustrate Bronx history through the Revolutionary War to present day. It contains an exhibit highlighting the history of the house, a room of American presidents who contributed to the Bronx, and a display of collective items from actual American wars. There is currently no residence and although the site is a two–story house, the top floor is not for public access. It is well preserved since the original floor planning and structure is kept to maintain and respect the architecture.

A statue of a Civil War soldier, sometimes called the Bronx River Soldier or the Bronx River Sentry statue, is located on the grounds of the House. It sculpted by John Grignoloa, but it shares no history with the Valentine–Varian House. It was commissioned by a Morrisania veterans' group in the 1890s, to serve as a memorial marker in Woodlawn Cemetery, but was damaged before it was delivered. It was then bought by John B. Lazzari, who owned a nearby quarry and stonecutter's yard, who erected it on a footbridge over the Bronx River on his property. In 1964, the statue fell and was later found near the site. The Bronx County Historical Society restored it to its original standing and claimed ownership of the statue to display near the house. The house is listed on the National Register of Historic Places.

== See also ==
- List of New York City Designated Landmarks in The Bronx
- National Register of Historic Places in Bronx County, New York
