= Autophoto =

American analog photobooth museum and company

AUTOPHOTO
- Established: 2025
- Location: Lower East Side, Manhattan, New York City, U.S.
- Type: Photobooth museum
- Website: autophoto.org

Autophoto is an American analog photobooth museum based in New York City. The organization is dedicated to the preservation, restoration, operation, and exhibition of vintage chemical-process photobooths.

The museum is New York City's first dedicated photobooth museum opening on the Lower East Side in 2025.

== History ==
Starting in 2009, Autophoto restores and maintains analog photobooths that use traditional wet chemical photographic processes rather than digital printing.

Their photobooths were originally manufactured by companies such as Photomat and Auto-Photo during the mid-20th century.

In 2025, Autophoto opened a museum and retail space on the Lower East Side of Manhattan dedicated to the history and operation of analog photobooths.

The museum features restored booths, historical displays, and demonstrations of traditional photographic processing.

== Reception ==
Autophoto has received coverage from media outlets including NBC News, ABC News, Marketplace, Time Out New York, Gothamist, and The Guardian for its preservation work and museum concept.

The museum is part of a broader revival of interest in analog photography and tactile media experiences.
