= Historic House Trust =

The Historic House Trust of New York City was formed in 1989 as a public-private partnership with the New York City Department of Parks and Recreation to preserve the historic houses located within New York City parks, although most of the houses were not originally city-owned. The Trust works with the individual houses to restore and promote the houses as a means of educating residents and visitors about the social, economic and political history of New York City and cast urban history in a new light. The Trust includes 23 historic sites, with 18 operating as museums and attracting 729,000 annual visitors.

== Properties ==
The Historic House Trust includes properties in each of New York City's five boroughs, and there is a house for every period in the City's history, depending on one's scheme of dividing history. A number of the properties have live-in caretakers to help prevent vandalism and other problems.

Landmark name	Image	Built	Borough	Description
Alice Austen House Museum		1690	Staten Island; 40.614917°N 74.063611°W	Home of photographer Alice Austen. Now a museum.
Bartow-Pell Mansion Museum		1836	The Bronx; 40.871611°N 73.805944°W	Exemplifies a type of early 19th-century country living in the Pelham Bay Park area.
Conference House		1675	Staten Island; 40.502861°N 74.253778°W	The Staten Island Peace Conference held here on September 11, 1776 unsuccessfully attempted to end the American Revolutionary War. This National and New York City Landmark is the only surviving pre-Revolutionary manor house in New York City.
Dyckman Farmhouse Museum		1784	Manhattan; 40.867547°N 73.923256°W	
Gracie Mansion		1799	Manhattan; 40.776111°N 73.943333°W	
Historic Richmond Town		1670	Staten Island; 40.571294°N 74.145814°W	
King Manor Museum		1750	Queens; 40.703056°N 73.861944°W	
Kingsland Homestead		1785	Queens; 40.763718°N 73.824255°W	Home to the remains of a weeping beech tree that was one of New York City's two "living landmarks" and the 'matriarch' of such trees in the United States
Lewis H. Latimer House		1889	Queens; 40.766063°N 73.829402°W	
Lefferts Historic House		1777	Brooklyn; 40.664323°N 73.963802°W	
Little Red Lighthouse		1889	Manhattan; 40.850242°N 73.946947°W	
Hendrick I. Lott House		1720	Brooklyn; 40.610278°N 73.932778°W	
Merchant's House Museum		1832	Manhattan; 40.727639°N 73.992528°W	
Morris-Jumel Mansion		1675	Manhattan; 40.834528°N 73.938611°W	
Old Stone House		1699	Brooklyn; 40.672958°N 73.984625°W	A 1930 reconstruction with some original materials of the Vechte-Cortelyou House which was destroyed in 1897. The site was part of the Battle of Long Island. It also housed the predecessors to the Brooklyn Dodgers at one time.
Edgar Allan Poe Cottage		1797	The Bronx; 40.865278°N 73.894444°W	
Queens County Farm Museum		1750	Queens; 40.748379°N 73.722612°W	
Seguine Mansion		1838	Staten Island; 40.515218°N 74.19753°W	
Swedish Cottage Marionette Theatre		1877	Manhattan; 40.779976°N 73.970215°W	
Valentine-Varian House		1758	The Bronx; 40.877222°N 73.879722°W	
Van Cortlandt House Museum		1758	The Bronx; 40.89°N 73.896389°W	
Wyckoff Farmhouse Museum		1652	Brooklyn; 40°38′40″N 73°55′15″W	

== History ==
In 1988, the City Parks department established a Historic House Office to preserve the 23 City-owned historic house-museums located in City parks. This office gave way to the Historic House Trust of New York City in 1989, funded by private donations, as well as grants, with the goal of each house becoming a professionally accredited museum. In an effort to increase awareness of the program during its first year of operation, the Trust developed a so-called passport program wherein visitors would receive stamps each time they visited one of the houses. If a visitor went to all 23 properties, they would receive an audience with the Mayor. HHT's passport program was brought back in 2008 as a method of commemorating the Trust's 20th anniversary.

The Trust also holds events such as the Historic Houses Festival, during which all the houses are open with different events at each, in order to raise awareness. New properties are added to the Trust when they come under city control if private care-taking or ownership has not succeeded, although the contents of the home may remain under private ownership.
