= Proteus Gowanus =

Coordinates: 40°40′45.57″N 73°59′15.32″W

Proteus Gowanus was an interdisciplinary gallery and reading room founded in 2005 in Gowanus, Brooklyn. The gallery, which curated year-long theme-based shows, took its name from shape-shifting Greek sea god Proteus and the nearby Gowanus Canal. Proteus Gowanus closed on June 28, 2015.

In 2006, The Village Voice praised Proteus Gowanus in its annual "Best of NYC" issue, calling the gallery "[the] best proof that the Gowanus Arts District may not be entirely a real estate fiction."
