= Jumel Terrace Historic District =

Historic district in Manhattan, New York

- U.S. National Register of Historic Places
- U.S. Historic district
- U.S. Historic district – Contributing property
- New York State Register of Historic Places
- New York City Landmark
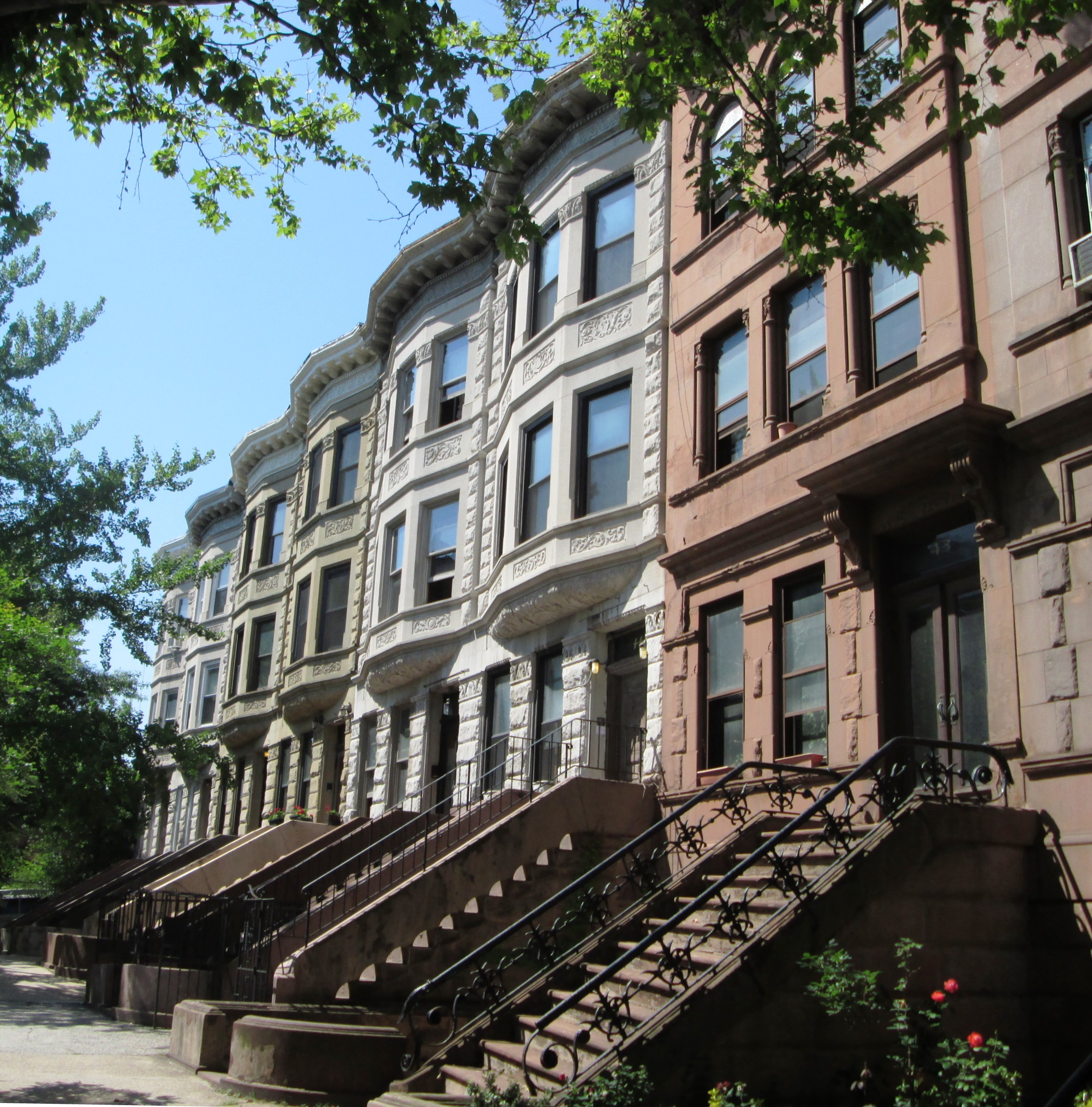
- Row houses at 439–451 West 162nd Street (2014)

- Location within New York City Location within New York Location within the United States
- Location: roughly bounded by: north: West 162nd Street east: Edgecombe Avenue south: West 160th Street west: St. Nicholas Avenue; Washington Heights, Manhattan, New York City
- Coordinates: 40°50′5″N 73°56′21″W
- Area: 4 acres (1.6 ha)
- Built: 1890–1909
- Architectural style: Queen Anne; Romanesque; Neo-Renaissance
- Part of: Dominican Historic District (ID100011048)
- NRHP reference No.: 73001220
- NYCL No.: 0638

Significant dates
- Added to NRHP: April 3, 1973
- Designated NYSRHP: June 23, 1980
- Designated NYCL: August 18, 1970

The Jumel Terrace Historic District is a small New York City and national historic district located in the Washington Heights neighborhood of Manhattan, New York City. It consists of 50 residential rowhouses built between 1890 and 1902, and one apartment building constructed in 1909, as the heirs of Eliza Jumel sold off the land of the former Roger Morris estate. The buildings are primarily wood or brick rowhouses in the Queen Anne, Romanesque and Neo-Renaissance styles. Also located in the district, but separately landmarked, is the Morris-Jumel Mansion, dated to about 1765.

The district was designated a New York City Landmark in 1970, and was listed on the National Register of Historic Places in 1973.

Among its notable residents was Paul Robeson, who lived at 555 Edgecombe Avenue.

== Description ==
The buildings included in the district are:

- 425–451 West 162nd Street, on the north side of the street
- 430–444 West 162nd Street, on the south side of the street; #430–438 were built in 1896 and were designed by Henri Fouchaux in a style transitional between Romanesque Revival and neo-Classical
- 10–18 Jumel Terrace, on the west side of the street; built in 1896 and designed by Henri Fouchaux in the Romanesque revival style
- 1–19 Sylvan Terrace, on the north side of the street (see below)
- 2–20 Sylvan Terrace, on the south side of the street (see below)
- 425 West 160th Street, also known as 2 Jumel Terrace, an apartment building built in 1909
- 418–430 West 160th Street, on the south side of the street; #418 was built in 1890 and was designed by Walgrove & Israels, the remainder of the row houses were built in 1891 and designed by Richard R. Davis in the Queen Anne style

Sylvan Terrace, located where West 161st Street would normally be, was originally the carriage drive of the Morris estate. In 1882–83 twenty wooden houses, designed by Gilbert R. Robinson Jr., were constructed on the drive. Initially rented out to laborers and working class civil servants, the houses were restored in 1979–81. They are now some of the few remaining framed houses in Manhattan.

== Gallery ==
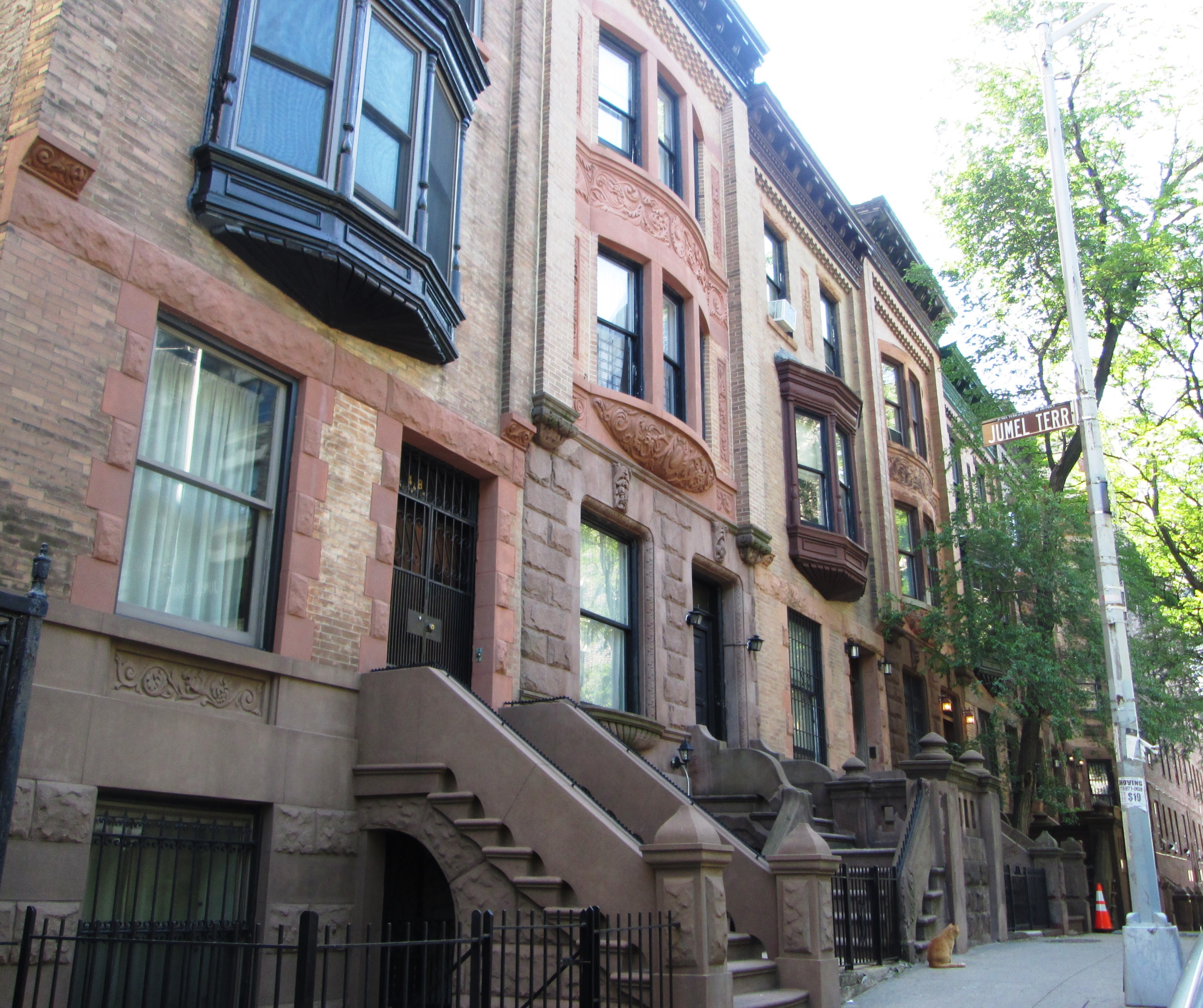
418-424 West 160th Street

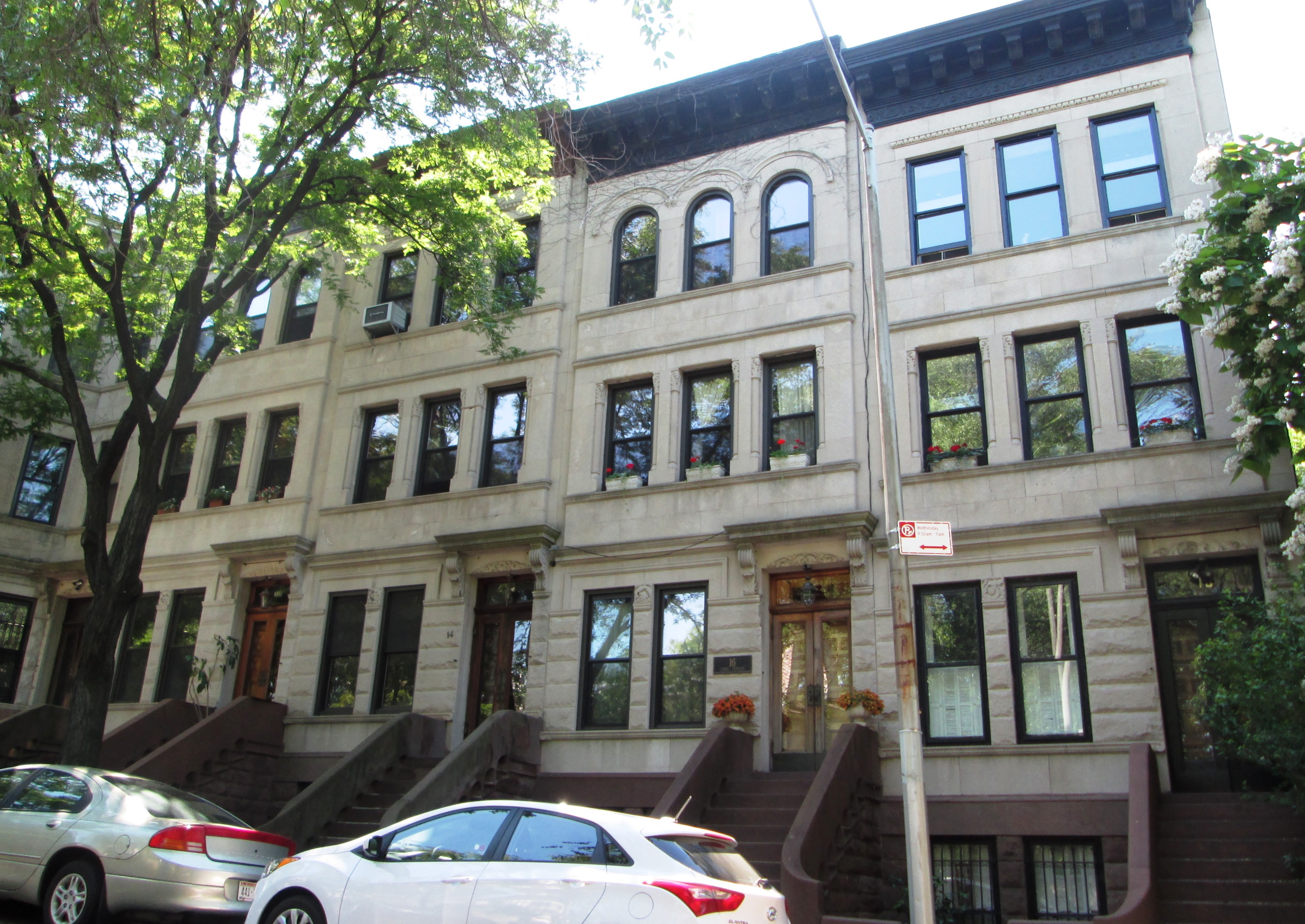
12-18 Jumel Terrace

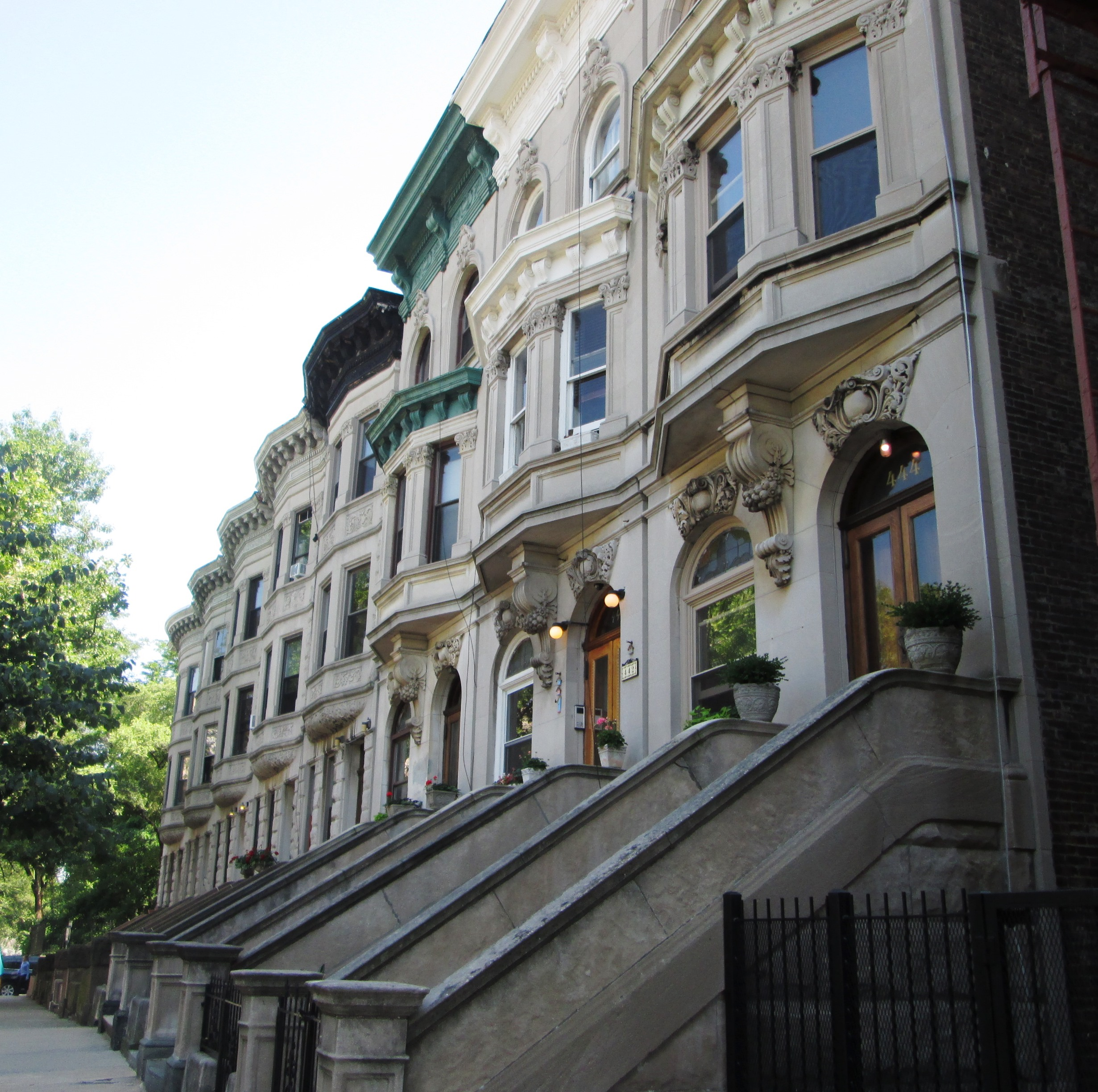
430-444 West 162nd Street

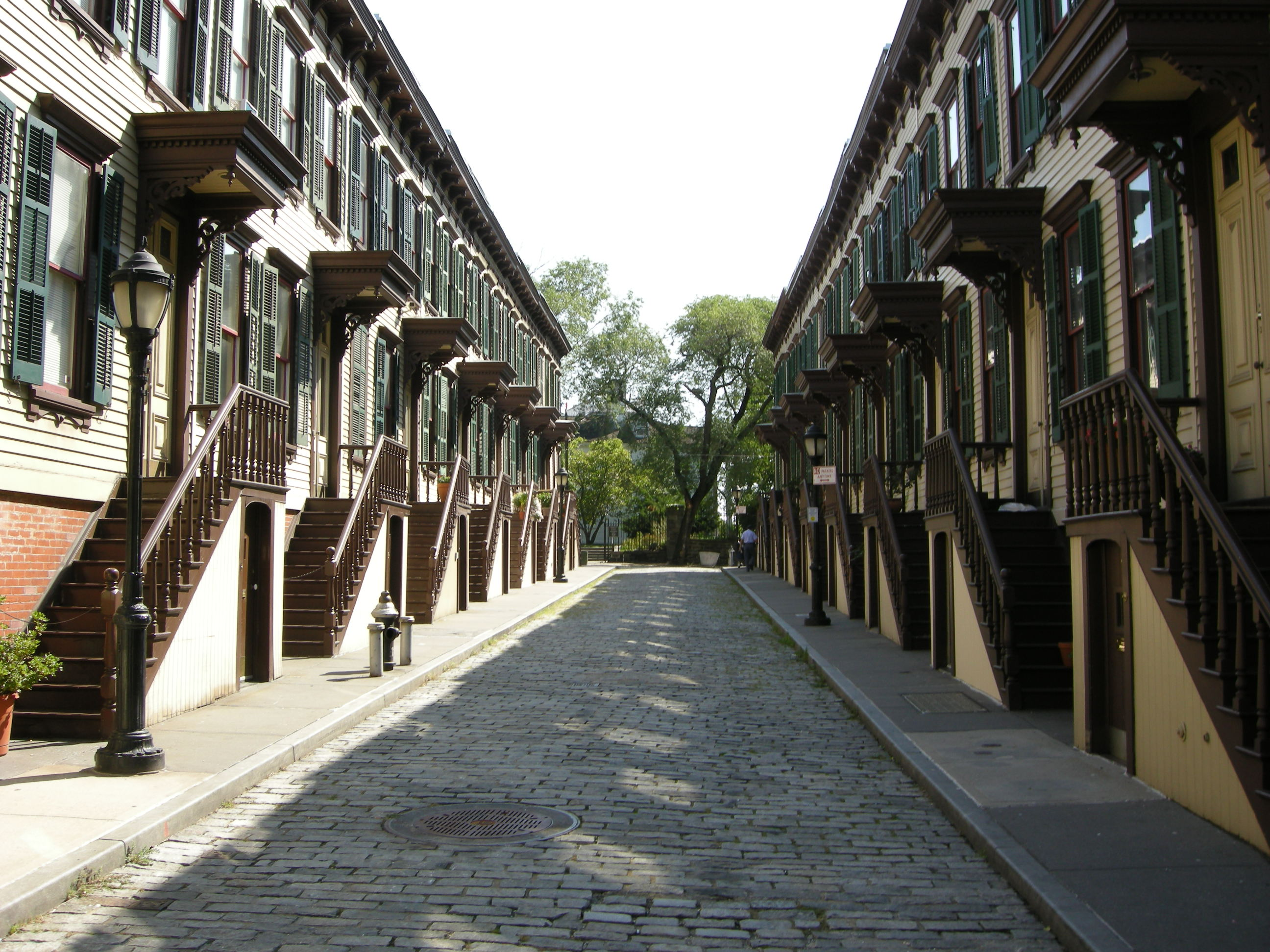
Sylvan Terrace looking east to Roger Morris Park

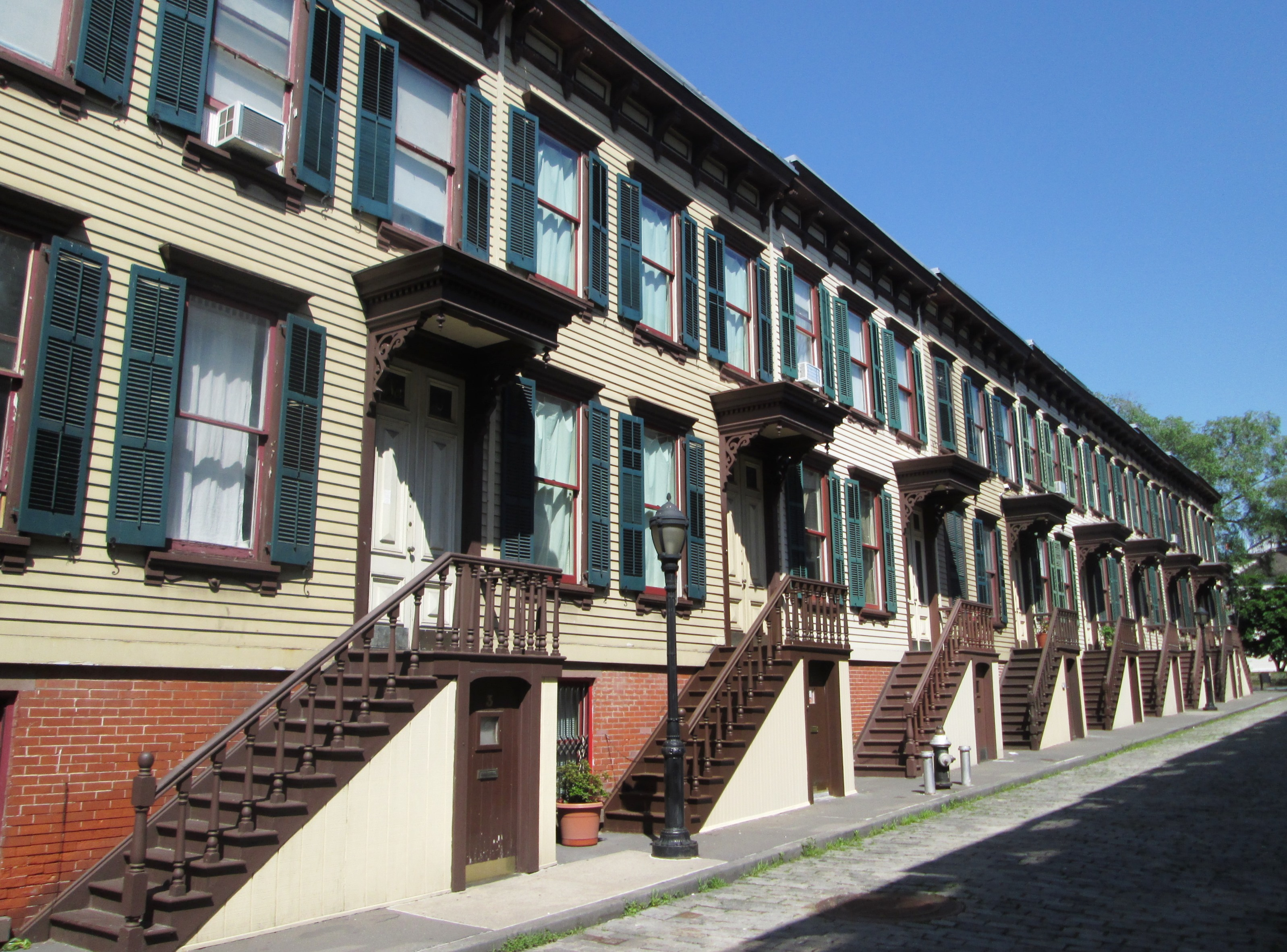
3-19 Sylvan Terrace (south side) looking east from Jumel Terrace

== See also ==
- List of New York City Designated Landmarks in Manhattan above 110th Street
- National Register of Historic Places listings in Manhattan above 110th Street
