= Reginald Pelham Bolton =

Anglo-American engineer (1856–1942)

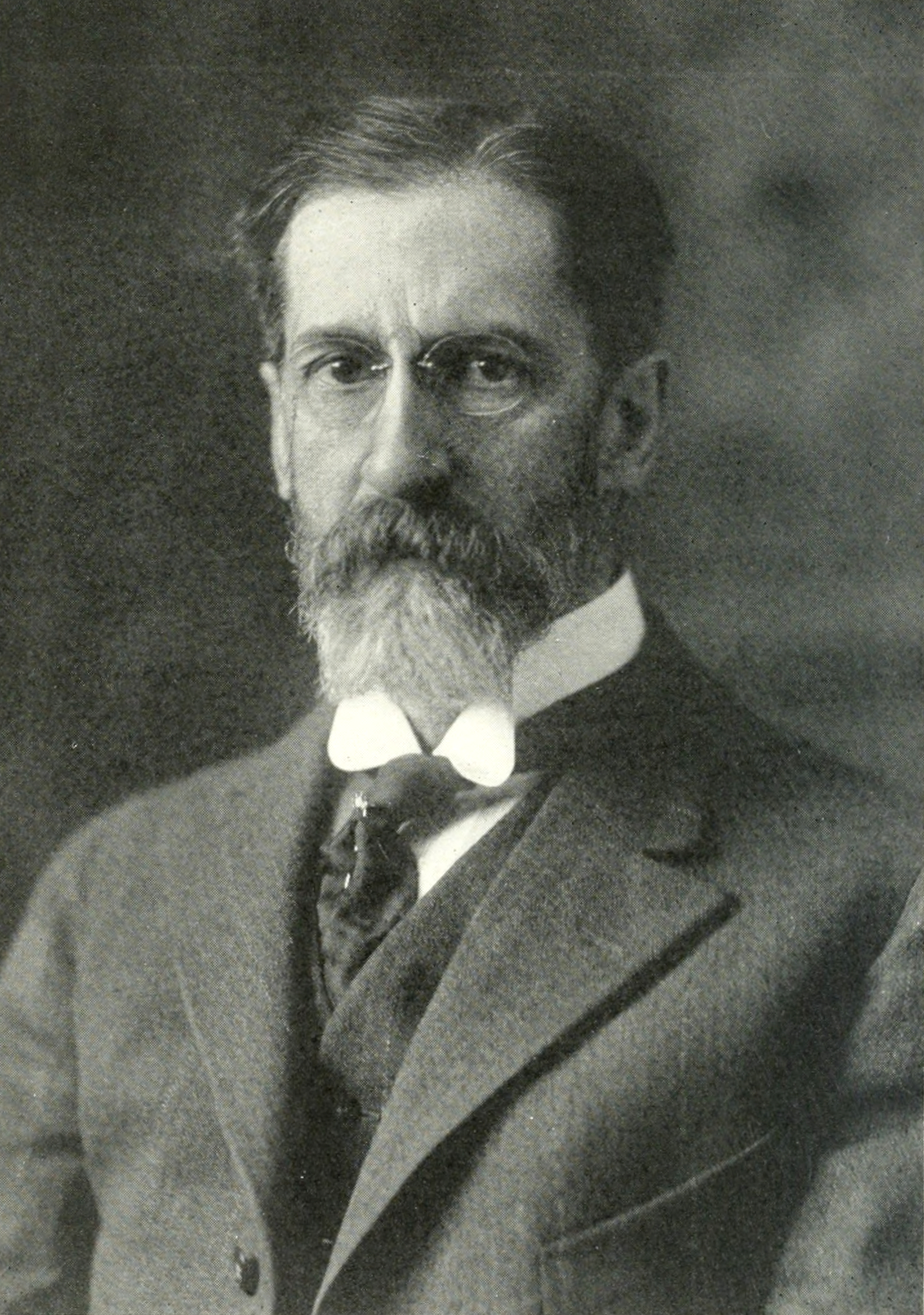
Reginald Pelham Bolton

Reginald Pelham Bolton (1856–1942) was an Anglo-American engineer, archaeologist and historian who conducted many digs in northern Manhattan during the late 19th and early 20th centuries. He and his fellow "Relic Hunters" uncovered thousands of artifacts. Bolton donated photographs and artifacts from his digs to the Dyckman Farmhouse Museum.

Bolton was born in London, England, to Rev. James Jay Bolton, and worked in England before coming to America. In 1878 he married Katherine (Kate) Alice Behenna (daughter of Captain James Behenna R.A.), and they were the parents of Ivy May and Guy Bolton, both of whom became writers. In 1892 he married Ethelind Huyck.

He was the vice president of the American Scenic and Historic Preservation Society and the City History Club of New York City, and president and chairman of the board of the Electric Motor Corporation. As the chairman of a committee of the Washington Heights Taxpayer's Association, he led an unsuccessful campaign to prevent the demolition of the home of John James Audubon but was able to prevent the demolition of both Poe Cottage and the Dyckman House. He also donated collections to the Jumel Mansion and the American Museum of Natural History.

Bolton was the author of over twenty books.
