= Morris–Jumel Mansion =

Historic house in Manhattan, New York

- U.S. National Register of Historic Places
- U.S. National Historic Landmark
- U.S. Historic district – Contributing property
- New York State Register of Historic Places
- New York City Landmark
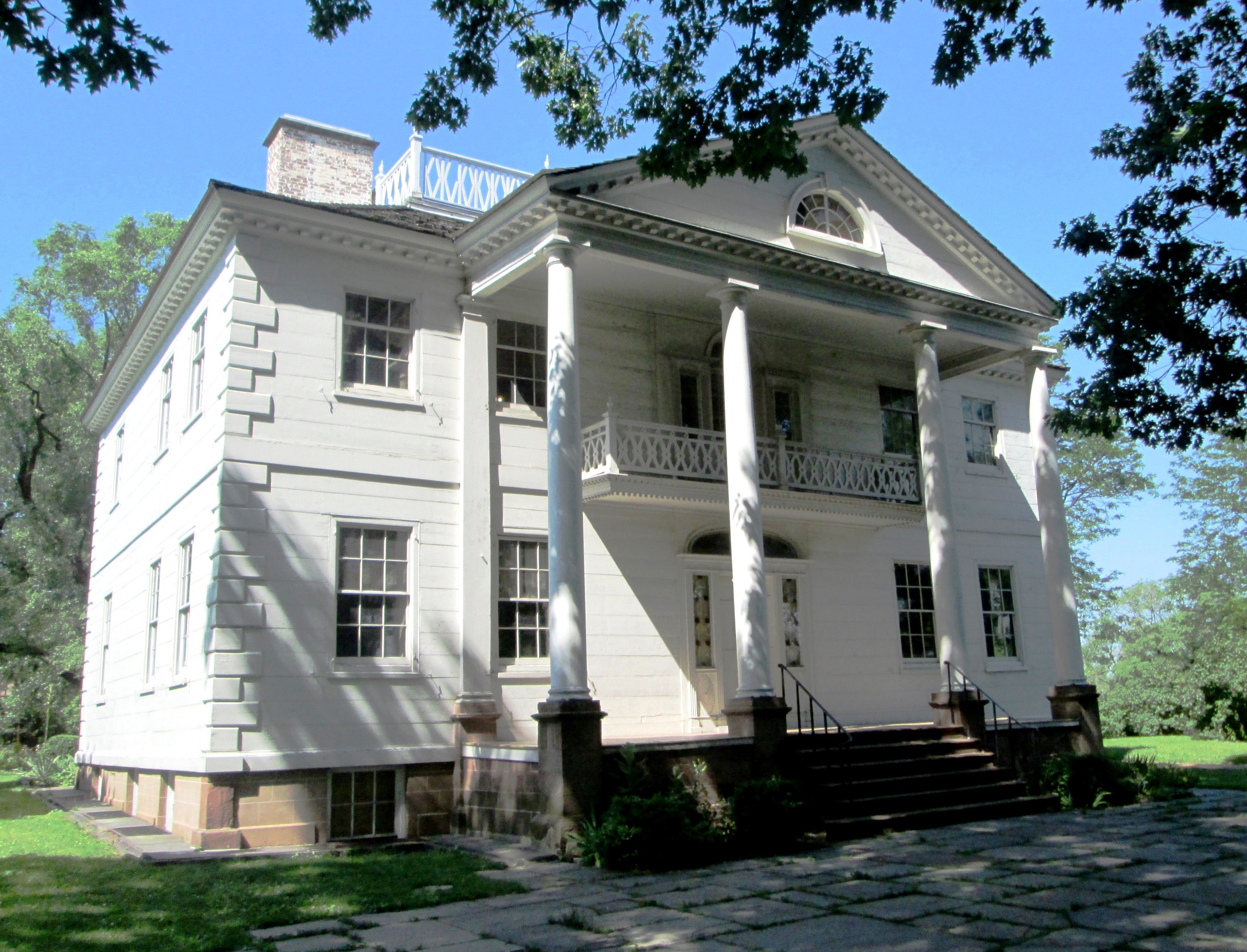
- The front facade in 2014
- Interactive map of Morris–Jumel Mansion
- Location: 65 Jumel Terrace in Roger Morris Park, bounded by West 160th Street, Jumel Terrace, West 162nd Street, and Edgecombe Avenue; Washington Heights, Manhattan; New York City
- Coordinates: 40°50′04″N 73°56′19″W
- Built: 1765, remodeled c. 1810
- Architectural style: Palladian, Georgian, and Federal
- Part of: Jumel Terrace Historic District (ID73001220); Dominican Historic District (ID100011048)
- NRHP reference No.: 66000545
- NYSRHP No.: 06101.001801
- NYCL No.: 0308, 0888

Significant dates
- Added to NRHP: October 15, 1966
- Designated NHL: January 20, 1961
- Designated CP: April 3, 1973 (Jumel Terrace); January 24, 2025 (Dominican)
- Designated NYSRHP: June 23, 1980
- Designated NYCL: exterior: July 12, 1967 interior: May 27, 1975

The Morris–Jumel Mansion (also known as the Morris House, Mount Morris, Jumel Mansion, and Morris–Jumel Mansion Museum) is an 18th-century historic house museum in the Washington Heights neighborhood of Upper Manhattan in New York City, United States. It is the oldest extant house in Manhattan, having been built in 1765 by British military officer Roger Morris, and was also home to the family of socialite Eliza Jumel in the 19th century. The New York City government has owned the house since 1903. The house's facade and interior are New York City designated landmarks, and the building is a National Historic Landmark and a contributing property to the Jumel Terrace Historic District and the Dominican Historic District.

Roger Morris developed the house for himself and his wife Mary Philipse Morris, but only lived there until 1775. Continental Army General George Washington used the mansion as his temporary headquarters for one month in late 1776, during the American Revolutionary War, after which British and Hessian officers occupied the house until 1783. After the British evacuation of New York, the house passed through multiple owners over the next three decades, being used variously as a residence and a tavern. The Jumels bought the house in 1810, living there intermittently until the late 1830s; the Jumel family and the related Chase family then occupied the house consistently until 1887. After being sold twice more, the house was owned by the Earle family from 1894 to 1903. After the city acquired the mansion, it reopened as a museum on May 29, 1907, and was operated by the Washington Headquarters Association. The house has undergone renovations in the 1930s, 1940s, and 1980s.

The house, designed with elements of the Federal, Georgian, and Palladian styles, has a raised basement and three above-ground stories. It has a wooden facade with a double-height portico facing south and an octagonal annex in the rear. The interior consists of a kitchen in the basement; a parlor, library, and dining room on the first floor; bedrooms on the upper floors; and wide central hallways. The museum's collection includes furniture, decorations, household items, and personal items belonging to its former occupants. The museum also presents performances and events at the house. Both the museum's exhibits and the house's architecture have received positive commentary, and the mansion has been featured in several media works.

== Site ==
The mansion is located at 65 Jumel Terrace in the Washington Heights neighborhood of Upper Manhattan in New York City. The house is in Roger Morris Park, within the boundaries of the Jumel Terrace Historic District, but is landmarked separately from the historic district. The entirety of the Jumel Terrace Historic District is within another historic district, the Dominican Historic District. The land lot, which is coextensive with Roger Morris Park, measures 62,000 square feet (5,760 m^{2}) with a frontage of 359.25 feet (109.50 m) and a depth of 168.67 feet (51.41 m). The site is bounded by Jumel Terrace to the west, 160th Street to the south, Edgecombe Avenue to the east, and 162nd Street to the north.

Extending west of the mansion is Sylvan Terrace, (Note: Also known erroneously as Sylvan Place) which was originally the mansion's carriage driveway. The house is surrounded by residential buildings, such as the 555 Edgecombe Avenue apartment building (formerly the Roger Morris Apartments) to the south. There are numerous row houses on the surrounding blocks, which include some of Manhattan's last remaining wood-frame houses. The 163rd Street–Amsterdam Avenue station of the New York City Subway is near the mansion.

The mansion sits atop Coogan's Bluff, from which Lower Manhattan, the Hudson River including the Palisades, the Bronx, Westchester, the Long Island Sound, and the Harlem River were once visible. The mansion also overlooked the Polo Grounds baseball stadium immediately to the east. The Jumel family, who once occupied the mansion, claimed to be able to see seven counties from the house. In the late 19th century, the house was visible from several miles away and had views of most locations in Manhattan, despite being readily accessible from the elevated Ninth Avenue Line. This led one 19th-century writer to state that "as a point of observation it is hardly to be excelled".

=== Roger Morris Park ===
Roger Morris Park, within which the mansion is situated, is a 1.52-acre (0.62 ha) park bounded by Jumel Terrace, Edgecombe Avenue, 160th Street, and 162nd Street. The park, named after British military officer Roger Morris, is the only remnant of a 130-acre (53 ha) estate that belonged to him and his wife, Mary Philipse Morris. The Morris property covered some distance from Harlem all the way to the Hudson River to the west. The mansion itself was built on one of the highest natural points in Manhattan, though the site sloped slightly upward to the north.

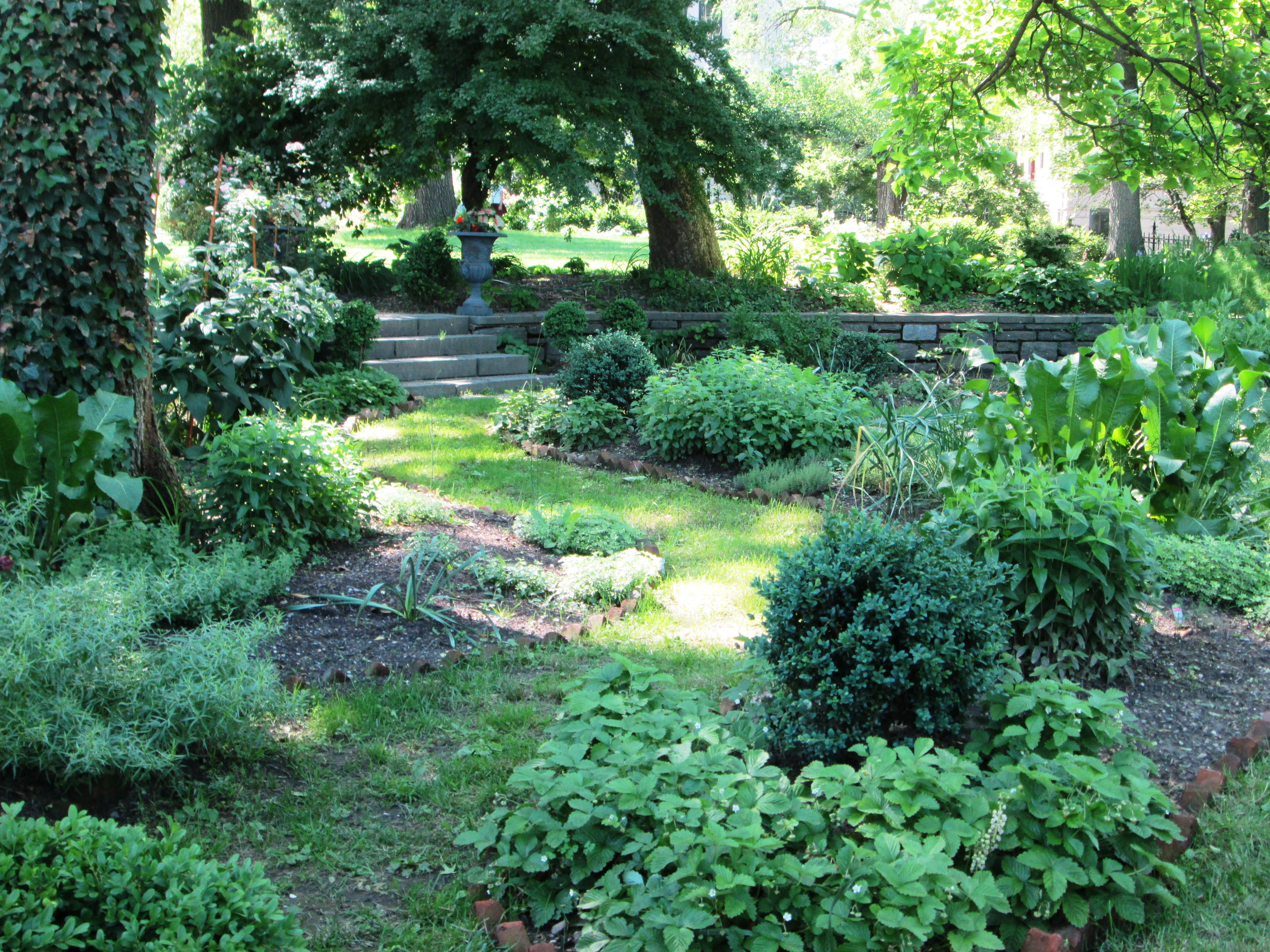
The sunken garden in Roger Morris Park

A gate to the west, along Jumel Terrace, provides entry to the park. The gate is overshadowed by a saucer magnolia, and a brick path leads from the gate to the mansion's front door, which is lined with additional trees. Due to the steep slope of the site, there is a masonry retaining wall to the east, facing Edgecombe Avenue. There are brick pathways throughout the park.

The northeast corner of the park contains a sunken garden, which was designed by Helen Elise Bullard during a 1934–1935 Works Progress Administration renovation. It was adapted from an earlier Victorian-style garden on the site. The garden, which measures about 58 by 63 feet (18 by 19 m), is octagonal; the shape was inspired by that of the mansion's octagonal annex. Stone paths divide the garden into quadrants, and there is a retaining wall around it. Next to the garden is an octagonal structure with a brick facade. There are also lawns on the west and north sides of the mansion, as well as a rose garden on the east side.

== Residential history ==
During the 17th century, the site was part of the town of Harlem and was located on a larger plot called the Great Maize Land. The first house on the site had been developed by Jan Kiersen, who received a half-morgen of land, about 1,495 square yards (1,250 m^{2}), in 1695 or 1696. He also received permission to build a house, barn, and garden east of Kingsbridge Road (now St. Nicholas Avenue). Kiersen received a deed to the land in 1700 or 1701 and gradually enlarged his estate. The land had been passed down to Kiersen's daughter Yantie (also spelled Jannetje) and her husband Jacob Dyckman by the late 1750s. Kiersen's two sons had sold off their interests in the farm prior to 1763, when the property was sold to James Carroll for 1,000 New York pounds. Carroll farmed on the land for two years before selling it to Roger Morris in 1765. (Note: Reginald Pelham Bolton writes that Carroll and Morris bought different pieces of the Kiersen property and claims that the house was completed in 1758. However, other sources state that Morris acquired the property directly from Carroll and that work on the house began in 1765. According to Arnold Pickman, Morris testified that he acquired several tracts of land from the Carrolls in August 1765 and that the property already contained a house belonging to Kiersen.)

=== Morris ownership ===
==== Development and early occupancy ====
Roger Morris, who served as a member of the Executive Council of the Province of New York, had retired from the British Army in 1764. At the time, Roger and Mary Morris lived at Broadway and Stone Street near the site of the present Bowling Green Custom House. Concurrently, the New York Mercury published an advertisement for a site in Upper Manhattan, with an orchard, two nearby rivers, and panoramic views in all four directions. Morris may have purchased the site around June 1765, when the advertisement was withdrawn. At the time, the site was still rural, the land was part of the British Province of New York, and New York City comprised what is now Lower Manhattan.

Construction began in mid-1765. (Note: Some early sources claim that the house was finished in 1758. According to Shelton, this might stem from the fact that the year "1758" was inscribed into the house and that the Morris family had already left the Thirteen Colonies when early historians began collecting information about the house.) Contractors secured oak timbers from the nearby forest, which oxen then pulled to the site. Roger Morris described the site as a place where he "might find an eligible retreat for a gentleman fond of rural employments and who wishes to pass the Summer months with pleasure and profit". The house was originally known as Mount Morris but was also referred to as the Roger Morris House. Morris also built a stable and carriage house near the mansion. The entire estate was completed by 1770. There also were a set of barns, which were located to the north, near what is now 165th Street.

The Morrises' two sons and two daughters were born at the house, and four slaves also resided there. The Morrises lived there until 1775, when the American Revolutionary War began. Both Roger and Mary were Loyalists affiliated with the British cause. The historian William Henry Shelton wrote that Mount Morris was vulnerable to arson attacks from Patriots—who sought American independence—since Roger was a member of New York's legislative council. In an attempt to protect his property, Roger went to England at the start of the war. The rest of the family stayed at the house in mid-1775 and possibly early 1776, but they had fled by mid-1776, likely to the Philipse estate in Yonkers.

==== Use during the American Revolutionary War ====
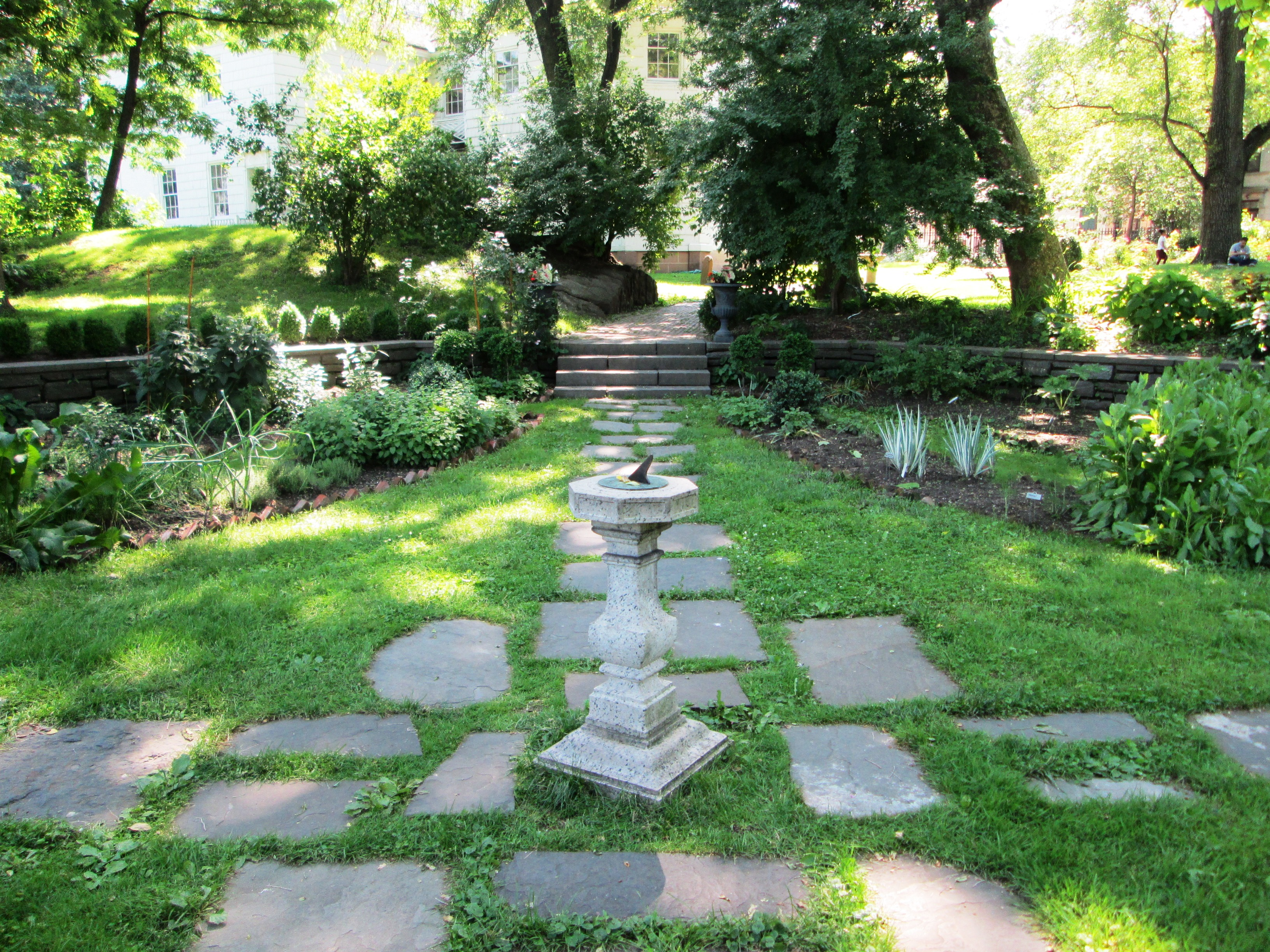
The garden in Roger Morris Park, which serves as the grounds for the mansion

Continental Army general William Heath and his officers occupied the house as early as September 5, 1776, holding it for their commander in chief, George Washington. Washington used the mansion as a headquarters for a month after British troops forced his army to retreat to Upper Manhattan. He entered the house on the night of September 14–15, 1776; the exact date and time of his arrival is unclear. (Note: Soldiers had finished preparing the house for Washington on Saturday, September 14, and he is known to have been in the house at 11:00 a.m. on Sunday, September 15. However, in a letter written on September 20, Washington wrote that "I removed my quarters to this place on Sunday last".) The house was chosen because of its elevated topography, which enabled Washington to see approaching enemy troops. There were claims that Washington may have chosen the site because of a previous romantic attraction to Mary Morris, but these rumors were unfounded. (Note: See also Mary Philipse § The Washington legend.)

Washington stayed at the mansion for a month with his military secretary and several aides, strategizing for the Battle of Harlem Heights while headquartered there. About 8,000 troops stayed in nearby camps, while some troops set up wooden huts along modern-day Sylvan Terrace. He reportedly observed the Great Fire of 1776 from the mansion's second-floor balcony. The Continental Army remained in "undisturbed possession of their camps" until about October 18, when the Battle of Pell's Point began. Washington retreated around October 21–22 to flee advancing British troops, and Continental Army colonel Robert Magaw was left to guard the house. On November 16, 1776, during the Battle of Fort Washington, Washington's troops tried to reenter the house but were beaten back by British troops. The British captured about 3,000 Continental Army soldiers, took nearby Fort Washington, and occupied the house. Captured Continental Army prisoners were tied up in the mansion's barns.

The British occupied the house from 1776 until the evacuation of New York in 1783. Documentation of the British troops' time at the house is sparse and is described mainly in two soldiers' journals. Records do not show who occupied the house just after the British captured Fort Washington. Maps from 1777 and 1782 showed that there were four buildings around the mansion's site, which likely included a barn, a coach house, and another house. The mansion became the headquarters of British lieutenant-general Henry Clinton until 1777 and Hessian commander Baron Wilhelm von Knyphausen during 1778. The latter's staff also took up some space in the house. Other Hessian and British commanders sporadically occupied the mansion, and a tent camp existed nearby. During 1780, the British used the house as a lookout station, and Hessian major general Von Lossburg also lived there.

=== Confiscation, 1780s to 1800s ===
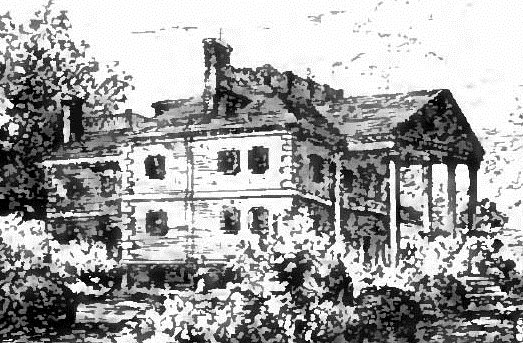
The Palladian style mansion built by Morris in northern Manhattan in 1765, the family home until the onset of the American Revolution in 1775. Seen here in 1892, after it had been altered with a Federal style entrance.

In 1779, the Colony of New York's Commissioners of Forfeiture passed the Act of Attainder, which confiscated all Loyalists' properties as soon as the British withdrew from New York. The Morrises forfeited their Harlem Heights estate, which was advertised for sale in the New York Gazette and Weekly Mercury in 1783. Following its confiscation, Mount Morris was occupied by several different tenants. The house was recorded as having been sold in July 1784 to John Berrian and Isaac Ledyard for 2,250 New York pounds. Josiah Collins Pumpelly and the St. Louis Post Dispatch stated that Ledyard lived in the house for at least a year, but Arnold Pickman wrote that neither Berrian nor Ledyard lived in the house.

The house became a tavern in 1785, a capacity in which it served for about two years. Talmage Hall operated the tavern, (Note: Sometimes spelled "Talmadge") which was known as Calumet Hall. The tavern was a popular stop along the Albany Post Road, since it was the first tavern travelers saw after leaving New York City. Contemporary advertisements promoted the fact that the tavern was in the Morrises' old house and the presence of stagecoach service to Upstate New York and New England. One observer was quoted in the New York Times as saying that the mansion was suitable for both temporary and permanent visitors and characterized the house's octagonal parlor room as being "very happily calculated for a turtle party". Hall had been forced to sell the tavern by June 1788.

A farmer, John Bogardus, is recorded as having rented the mansion in 1789 and 1790. After becoming U.S. President, George Washington, several Founding Fathers, and their families returned to the house for a party in 1790. Washington wrote that the mansion had been "confiscated, and in the possession of a common farmer". Ledyard had sold his half of the property before 1791 to Theodore Hopkins and Michael Joy. American real estate operator Anthony L. Bleecker bought the entirety of the Mount Morris estate in 1791 and 1792. He then attempted to sell it, renting the property to a farmer named Jacob Myer in the meantime. In 1793, Bleecker sold the parcel that included the Morris House to William Kenyon. After Roger Morris died in 1794, Mary Morris sued to regain ownership of the mansion, claiming that the Act of Attainder did not apply to the mansion since it belonged to her as part of the Morrises' prenuptial agreement.

Kenyon sold the entire parcel to Leonard Parkinson, an Englishman, on August 29, 1799. Parkinson decided to sell and subdivide his estate in 1809; the estate was split into fifteen lots, and the mansion and an adjacent coach house were classified as occupying lot number 8. The same year, Mary Morris dropped her claim to the mansion, and John Jacob Astor bought the property from the Morris heirs. Myer was recorded as having rented the property through 1809; the 1800 census indicates that his household had 11 people. A map from 1810 showed only two associated outbuildings (a barn and a coach house), but a map from 1815 showed two additional buildings and a gatehouse near the mansion.

=== Jumel ownership ===
In 1810, French wine merchant Stephen Jumel paid $10,000 for the house and some land around it. He moved into the mansion with his wife, the socialite Eliza Bowen Jumel, and their adopted daughter, Mary Bowen. (Note: Mary's surname is sometimes spelled "Bownes".) The Jumels had largely been "neglected by society" when they lived in Lower Manhattan, and Eliza, who had come from poor beginnings, was anxious to become part of New York City's elite. According to Shelton, members of the public may have become interested in the mansion's history because of Eliza's lifestyle, which Shelton called "a leaf out of the book of the fairies". The Washington Post wrote that the house was "the social center of colonial New York" for a half-century after the Jumels bought the house.

==== 1810s and 1820s ====
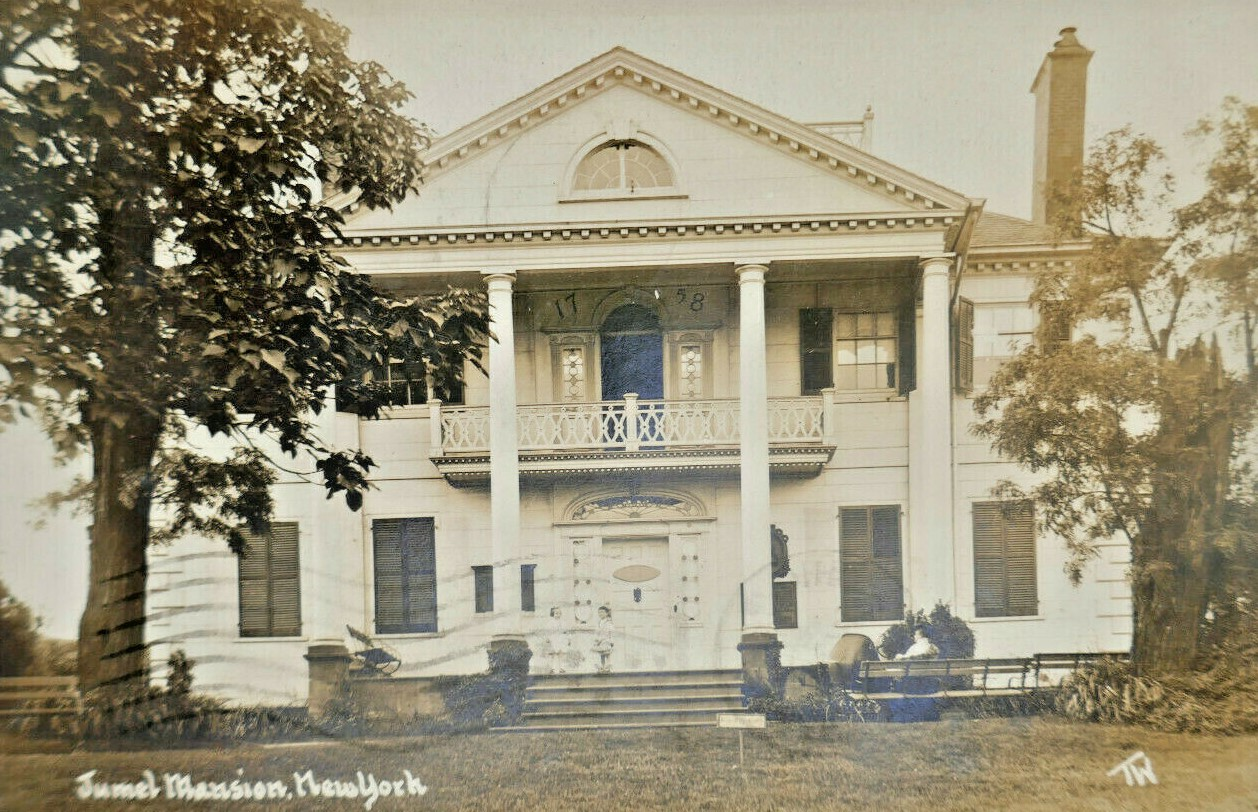
The Morris–Jumel Mansion on a postcard sent November 10, 1909

The 1810 United States census shows that seven people lived in the Jumel household, but the Jumels probably split their time between the uptown mansion and their Lower Manhattan house. The Jumels remodeled the house, adding the Federal style entrance and redecorating the interior in the Empire style. The family reproduced the original wallpaper and bought as much furniture as they could. Stephen Jumel publicly described the renovation as a gift to his wife in an attempt to increase her standing in society. He also bought up several neighboring farms. The family sometimes stayed in their other houses in Lower Manhattan and France. Mary Bowen refused to stay in the mansion by herself because of a belief that the house was haunted by the ghosts of soldiers. The Jumels hosted numerous prominent European and American guests at their mansion. (Note: One legend holds that the Jumels invited Louis Philippe I and Charles Maurice de Talleyrand-Périgord to the mansion, but both men were recorded as having been in the country before 1800, when the Jumels did not yet own the mansion.) By 1814, Stephen Jumel had offered the mansion and his other properties for sale, but the mansion was not sold.

In 1815, Stephen Jumel imported several Egyptian cypress trees from France, which were planted on vacant lots near the mansion. The same year, Stephen and Eliza placed the mansion in trust. The Jumels went to France the same year because they had failed to gain enough social standing. One story alleges that Stephen offered French emperor Napoleon his house in Harlem Heights, but Shelton writes that the Jumels had departed before Napoleon's defeat in the Battle of Waterloo, making this unlikely. Eliza, who had become tired of her social life in France, returned to the Jumel Mansion in 1817. Eliza and her servants were the only occupants of the mansion until Mary Bowen arrived in 1818. The 1820 census shows that seven persons lived in the mansion. Eliza sold some of the more ornate furniture and paintings in the house in April 1821 and then returned to France.

During the time that the Jumels stayed in France, the mansion was rented to several people during the 1820s, albeit likely only during the summer. These included the family of Moses Field in 1825 and the Clinton family in 1826. Stephen deeded Eliza the mansion and surrounding land in 1825; sources disagree on whether the move was due to Eliza Jumel's duplicity or whether the move was intended to prevent Stephen's creditors from taking over the mansion. Eliza returned permanently in 1826 with her husband's power of attorney. At the time, Stephen wanted to sell off all of his American properties and had no intention of going back to the U.S., but he ultimately returned in mid-1828. The same year, ownership of the mansion was transferred to Mary. Records indicate that an ice house was built next to the mansion after the Jumels returned from France. The 1830 United States census recorded eleven people in the Jumel household who lived in the mansion. Stephen died in 1832 after being injured in a carriage accident.

==== 1830s to 1860s ====
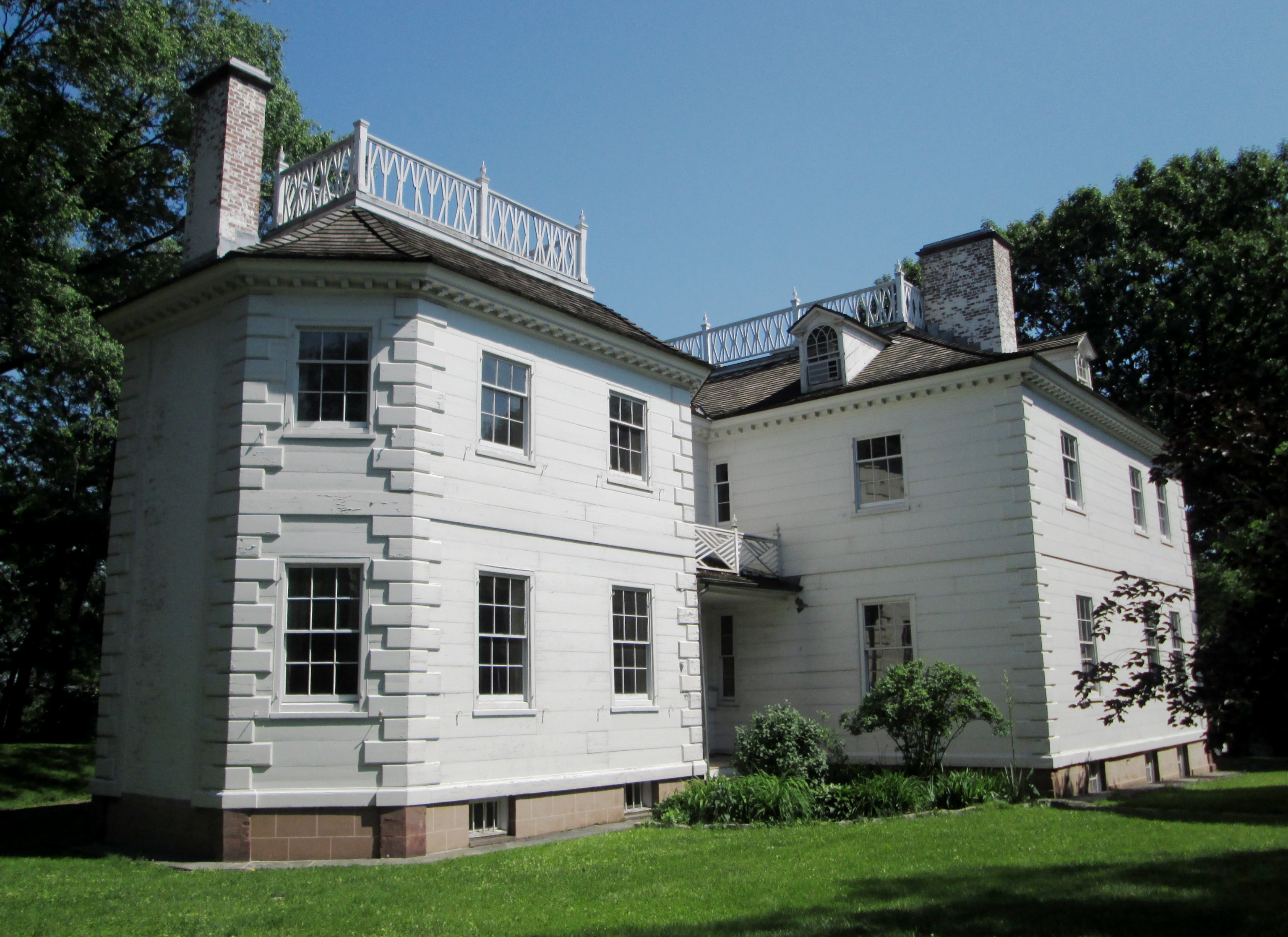
The mansion seen from the northwest

Around the time of Stephen's death, Mary married the lawyer Nelson Chase, and Eliza bought additional furniture for the mansion. Eliza was engaged to former U.S. vice president Aaron Burr in 1833; they were married in the house's parlor on July 3 of that year. The marriage, and Burr's stay in the house, was short. Eliza filed for divorce in 1834, which was granted in 1836, shortly before Burr's death. Burr left the mansion for seven months after Eliza filed for divorce, then returned for another five weeks. Following Burr's death, Eliza was ostracized from high society, and she stayed in the mansion from time to time. (Note: Sources disagree on the extent to which Eliza stayed in the mansion after Burr died. The New York City Landmarks Preservation Commission writes that Eliza rarely visited the Jumel Mansion, instead staying in the Saratoga, New York; Hoboken, New Jersey; and Lower Manhattan. Shelton states that Eliza rented various residences in Manhattan during the 1830s, while Reginald Pelham Bolton wrote that Eliza spent most of her time at the Jumel Mansion and went up to Saratoga in the summer.) She reportedly lived in the mansion until 1834, then rented residences elsewhere for five years.

During the late 1830s, the mansion may have been occupied by the Pell and Monroe families. The carpenter Alvah Knowlton built a new entryway around 1838. Eliza likely did not live in the mansion for much of the 1840s, but she and the Chase family had moved into the mansion again by 1848, five years after Mary Chase died. The 1850 United States census showed nine people in the Jumel household who lived at the mansion, while an 1855 statewide census recorded 14 people in the Jumel household. A well was excavated on the grounds around 1857.

Eliza Jumel was eccentric in her later years. By the 1850s, she was reportedly seen parading around the house on horseback, followed by people dressed up as soldiers. Unscrupulous neighbors took advantage of the woman's eccentricity, "helping themselves to anything they wanted on the neglected farms of the estate", in Shelton's words. The 1860 United States census recorded seven people in the household. The Chase family lived in the mansion until 1862, when they were thrown out after a fight in which Eliza's great-nephew threw an inkstand at the painting of his great-aunt. Eliza and one male servant occupied the house until her death in 1865. During that time, the mansion had few visitors and began to decay. Shelton wrote that Eliza was often seen wearing tattered dresses and entertaining imaginary visitors. After Eliza Jumel's death she became the main focus of paranormal suspicions, partly due to rumors that she caused Stephen to die by falling from a carriage onto a pitchfork.

=== After Eliza Jumel's death ===
==== Disputes over the estate ====
Following Eliza's death, her estate was involved in a series of lawsuits revolving around her will. The Chase family lived in the house for about two decades after Eliza died. By 1868, the mansion was occupied by Nelson Chase, the family of Nelson's son William Inglis Chase, and the family of Nelson's daughter Eliza Jumel Péry. The three branches of the families lived in different parts of the mansion and ate dinner at different times. The 1870 United States census did not list the Chase household, but the 1880 census showed twelve members of the Chase household living in the mansion. One contemporary writer said the Jumel Mansion was "doomed to speedy transformation from an elegant country-seat to an elegant suburban portion of the town" because of Manhattan's growing urbanization. At some point in the late 19th century, either right before or not long after Eliza Jumel's death, a flagstone carriage drive was added in front of the mansion.

The disputes over the Jumel estate were not resolved until 1881, when a judge ruled that Mary Bowen had never legally owned the mansion and ordered that the Jumel estate be partitioned. In May 1882, the New York Supreme Court ruled that the Jumel Mansion could be put up for sale, and an auction for the mansion and surrounding estate was held that June. An unidentified purchaser bought the mansion and 30 neighboring lots for $40,000, but the sale was delayed after protests from several people alleging to be Stephen Jumel's heirs. Nelson Chase ultimately retained the mansion, although the estate was subdivided. He built a new barn around 1885; the barn was likely demolished before 1909. The family did not finish selling off their property in the area until 1921.

==== Sales of the mansion ====
The Chase family remained at the Jumel Mansion until Nelson Chase and Eliza Jumel Péry sold it in March 1887 to Henry H. Tobey, who resold it to Eban Sutton Jr. Sutton is not known to have lived in the mansion, and there are no definitive indications of who lived in the house immediately after the sale. Sarah Elizabeth "Lizzie" Le Prince likely moved into the house in 1889–1890 and remained there until 1894, but this cannot be confirmed. (Note: According to Arnold Pickman, the records from the 1890 United States census were destroyed in a fire, and records for the Le Prince family in the 1890 New York City Police Census are missing.) Lizzie's husband, the early filmmaker Louis Aimé Augustin Le Prince, wished to screen his films publicly at the mansion but disappeared mysteriously in 1890. Numerous pieces of furniture, purported to be from Eliza Jumel's collection, were auctioned off in early 1890, though the family of Nelson Chase claimed that they still owned the Jumel furniture. Sutton sold the mansion to Seth Milliken in May 1894.

The Earle family acquired the mansion in 1894 and renamed it Earle Cliff. The new owners were Ferdinand Pinney Earle, whose mother's family were related to the Morrises, and his wife, Lillie J. Earle. They moved many colonial-style decorations to the cellar, replaced decorative elements, painted the walls, and installed wallpaper throughout various parts of the house. A new kitchen was built at the northeast corner of the house. A stair from the basement to the first-floor pantry was sealed off, and the Earles renovated the octagonal annex into a studio apartment and removed a dormer window. Lillie Earle, who headed the Washington Heights Society of the Children of the American Revolution, sometimes hosted events at the mansion. These included receptions for children, lawn parties, a commemoration of the Battle of Harlem Heights, and meetings of the Sons of the American Revolution. In 1898, a decade after the nearby Hamilton Grange had been relocated, there were unsuccessful proposals to move Earle Cliff. The 1900 United States census showed that seven members of the Earle household lived in the house. Ferdinand Earle lived in the mansion until his death at the beginning of 1903.

== Museum history ==
=== Acquisition and operation dispute ===
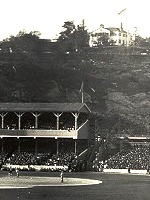
The mansion overlooking the Polo Grounds in 1905

As early as 1899, there had been calls for the government of New York City to acquire the Jumel Mansion and convert it to a museum. Supporters of the museum plan included the editor of The Spirit of '76 magazine, the American Scenic and Historic Preservation Society, Daughters of the American Revolution, and Sons of the American Revolution. At the time, the house was one of three remaining structures in Manhattan associated with George Washington, the other two being Fraunces Tavern and St. Paul's Chapel. The city's Board of Public Improvements first considered the plan in March 1900 and asked the Manhattan Department of Parks (later the New York City Department of Parks and Recreation, or NYC Parks) that September to map out the Jumel Mansion's site. After initially voting against acquiring the house, the Board of Public Improvements voted in favor of the acquisition in March 1901. The next month, the board approved a proposal to purchase the house for $150,000, although the sale was not finalized at that time.

The New York City Board of Aldermen passed legislation in December 1901 to convert the mansion and surrounding grounds into a public park. Seth M. Milliken moved to foreclose on a $30,000 mortgage on the house in May 1902, and a lis pendens was filed against the mansion early the next year as part of the foreclosure proceedings. The Daughters of the American Revolution formed a committee in February 1903 to raise money for the mansion, and the Board of Estimate and Apportionment approved the park's creation that May. Lillie Earle initially did not wish to sell the mansion to the city, but she later indicated that she was willing to sell the mansion to the city or to a historical organization. The city bought the house that July for $235,000. Following the sale, the Realty Protective Company sued Lillie, claiming that she had reneged on an agreement to pay the company ten percent of the house's sale price. The grounds had been downsized to 67,391 square feet (6,260.8 m^{2}) and were surrounded by retaining walls on three sides. Roger Morris Park opened to the public on December 28, 1903, and a bronze plaque was added next to the house's main entrance.

The Daughters of the American Revolution formed the Washington Headquarters Association (WHA) in March 1904 to operate the museum, claiming that they had the rights to operate the museum because their ancestors fought under Washington. Their sister organization, the Sons of the American Revolution, submitted a competing bid to operate the museum but later agreed to provide financial support to the Daughters. The Colonial Dames of America also submitted a bid, claiming that they were more responsible than the Daughters were. Following a dispute in which the New York State Legislature passed competing bills awarding operation of the museum to both the Colonial Dames and the Daughters, park commissioner John J. Pallas was appointed to mediate the dispute. As a compromise, governor Benjamin Odell signed a bill that May, allowing the Department of Parks to turn the house's operation over to either organization. Following a hearing in November 1904, Pallas ruled in 1905 that ownership of the mansion belonged to the Department of Parks. The Daughters did not contest Pallas's decision, though the WHA was still permitted to operate the museum.

=== Opening and early years ===
The WHA announced in April 1905 that it planned to restore the Morris–Jumel Mansion. The Board of Aldermen provided $100,000 in funding. The association planned to restore the original Colonial-style architectural details, unseal the old fireplaces, display some of the Jumel and Earle families' furniture, and landscape the gardens around the house. Other changes included a new wooden floor in the basement; a flower garden on the site of one of the mansion's barns; and an arbor to the east of the house. The mansion hosted events such as Washington's Birthday celebrations even before the renovation was completed. The Morris–Jumel Mansion Museum formally opened on May 29, 1907, after the renovation was completed. Kady Brownell, an American Civil War veteran, was the museum's first custodian.

In the first few years of the museum's operation, the WHA hosted two events at the house annually; by the early 1910s, the museum attracted over 30,000 visitors per year. The Morris–Jumel Mansion was one of the only remaining mansions in Washington Heights at the time, as most of the area's other large country homes were being demolished. The mansion was now well within the borders of New York City, easily accessible via the subway and the Amsterdam Avenue streetcar. A Colonial-style gateway, similar in design to the house's original gateway, was installed at the mansion in 1913 at a cost of $20,000. The following year, parts of the third floor opened as exhibit space. The WHA petitioned the Board of Aldermen to name the house Washington's Headquarters in 1915, as the mansion had no official name at the time, but the house was not renamed. The historian Reginald Pelham Bolton discovered parts of the mansion's original kitchen the next year.

William Henry Shelton, the museum's curator during the 1920s, reported that many visitors came from the West and Midwest (where few or no Revolutionary War–era structures existed) and that the museum was also popular among teachers and Francophones. The Herald Statesman reported that the museum was one of the most popular historical sites in Upper Manhattan. The mansion was repainted and renovated in 1922, when the portico's pillars and the entrance to the eastern portion of the house were rebuilt. In 1924, the Committee for the Restoration of Jumel Mansion approved Charles A. Platt's plans for a renovation of the mansion. The project included a new brick building for heating equipment. The project also included new landscaping and a restored kitchen. The project was expected to cost $115,000 by 1925, and plans for the renovation were delayed because of uncertainty about the original design of the front door.

=== 1930s to 1980s ===
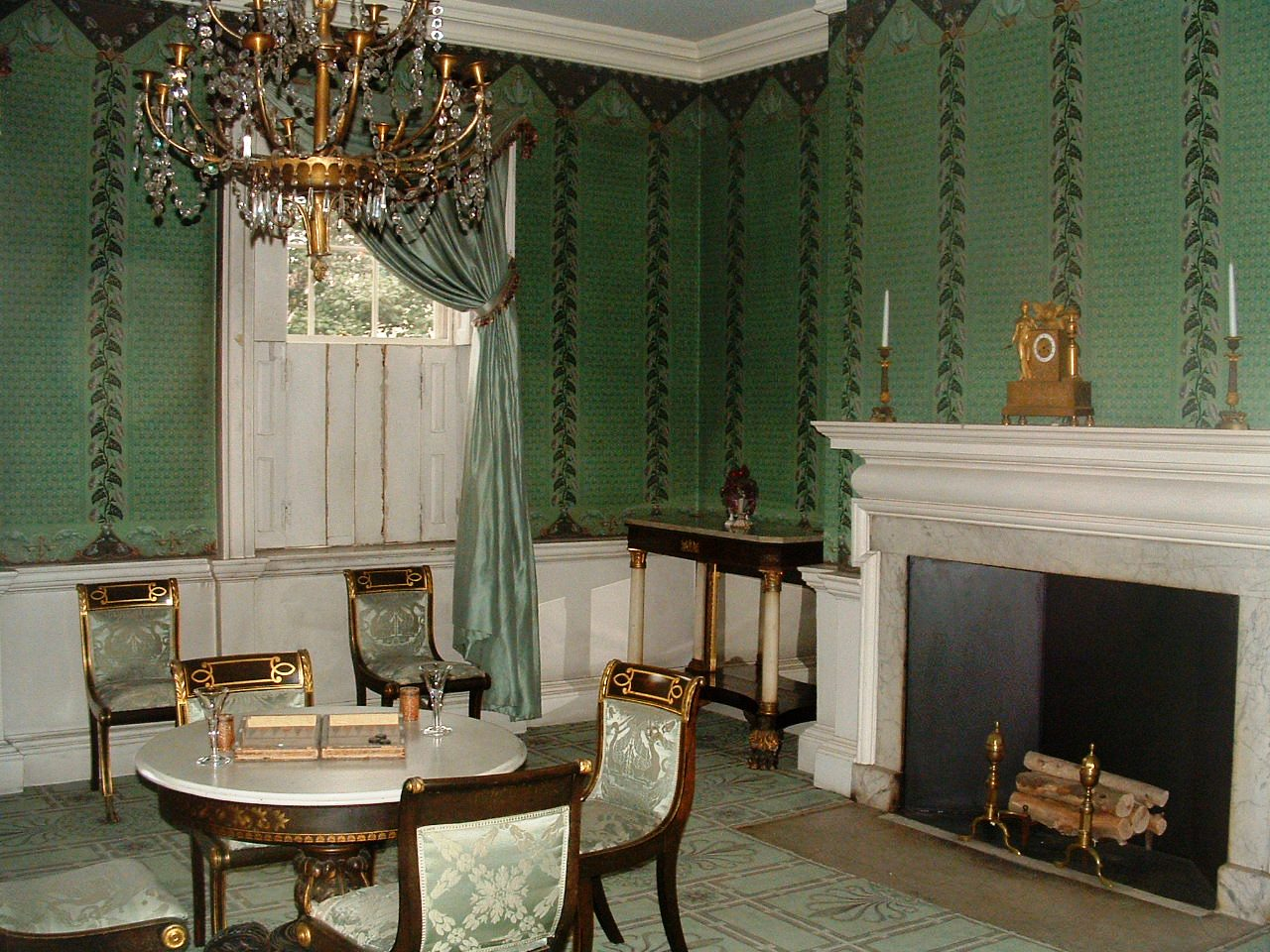
One of the rooms

The house had still not been renovated by the early 1930s, but it was repainted in 1932 in anticipation of Washington's 200th birthday. The New York City Department of Parks and Recreation (NYC Parks) designed a further renovation of the house in 1934 and hired Works Progress Administration (WPA) workers to carry out the project. Work on the renovation started that September. The project added a stairway to the basement on the east, as well as areaways along the western half of the house. The first-floor kitchen at the northeast corner was removed. In addition, a new garden, pathways, drainage pipes, gutter stones, and patio were built. The basement kitchen was restored to its 18th-century appearance, and an exhibit with colonial children's objects was added. The Daughters of the American Revolution also refurbished four rooms; each of the Daughters's four chapters was responsible for a different room. The house reopened in October 1936 and recorded 800 visitors within one month. The WHA dedicated a new flag outside the mansion in 1939.

In the mid-20th century, the house was known variously as the Morris Mansion and the Jumel Mansion. Nancy McClelland was hired in 1945 to restore the interiors, with assistance from Hofstatters' Sons and Watson & Collins. The house's exhibits were rearranged so the Morris family's belongings were on the first floor and the Jumel family's belongings were on the second floor. Period furniture and furnishings such as wallpaper were installed through the house. The restorations of the dining room and rear parlor were finished in June 1945, and the entire restoration was completed in October. The mansion remained in good condition the following decade and was designated as a national and city landmark in the 1960s. By then, there were persistent rumors that the house was haunted.

The museum saw 20,000 annual visitors by the 1970s, after a series of books about Eliza Jumel were published. The museum's curator at the time, Mrs. LeRoy Campbell, said most visitors came to the mansion because of their interest in Jumel's life. Among the visitors were British queen Elizabeth II, who toured the house in 1976 to celebrate the United States' bicentennial. By the early 1980s, nine of the house's rooms were open to the public. A board of trustees was raising money for the restoration of the house, which had again become dilapidated. The house received a $200,000 preservation grant from the New York state government in 1987. In spite of high crime rates in the surrounding neighborhood, the mansion's curator said in the late 1980s that the museum was largely unaffected by crime because of several security measures. The Morris–Jumel Mansion was one of the founding members of the Historic House Trust, established in 1989.

=== 1990s to present ===
The Morris–Jumel Mansion's exterior underwent an extensive renovation starting in 1990. Jan Hird Pokorny Architects, which had been hired in 1986 to conduct a survey of the house's condition, was also hired to restore the house. Structural improvements comprised three-quarters of the $600,000 cost. Pokorny's firm restored the structure to its 19th-century appearance, consulting old photographs and replacing architectural details such as the balustrade, dormers, and windows. One of the exterior stairways, built in the 1930s, was infilled. By the end of the 20th century, the mansion and surrounding area were frequented by buses carrying European and Japanese tourists, prompting complaints from local residents. There were twelve rooms on display at the time. The paint had started to peel off, the roof was leaking, and some decorative elements had begun to deteriorate in the early 2000s. As such, the house was repainted and the windows were replaced in 2002.

In 2013, an intern discovered a draft of the 1775 Olive Branch Petition while cleaning out the mansion's attic. The museum had been planning a $350,000 renovation at the time, and its executive director Carol Ward wanted to sell the Olive Branch Petition manuscript to raise money for an endowment. The manuscript was ultimately sold for over $912,500. In 2014, Ward announced plans to raise $250,000 for renovations and educational programming in advance of the house's 250th anniversary. The museum had attracted 17,000 visitors that year, less than half of whom were students. Ward obtained $1.2 million in funding from the Manhattan borough president's office and other sources, but NYC Parks wanted to raise another $1.5 million before beginning renovations. The project was to include renovations of the roof and front balcony, as well as repairs and acquisitions of furniture, which would be partially funded by $700,000 earned from the sale of the 1775 manuscript.

The museum's popularity increased after the Broadway musical Hamilton opened in 2015; Ward estimated that, in 2016, the museum may have seen a 75 percent increase in visitors because of the musical. Eliza Jumel's bedroom and the parlor were restored in the early 2020s. The Historic House Trust announced in November 2021 that it had secured $2.7 million for a renovation. By then, the cost of the renovation had increased due to both inflation and the need to fix additional issues. The house was deteriorating: the paint on the facade was peeling, and one of the portico's columns collapsed in late 2022. The New York Times described the house in late 2023 as being in such poor condition "that it is possible to touch it and walk away with a moist, splintered clump of wood siding in the palm of your hand". A $10 million renovation of the house, which included exterior repairs and accessibility upgrades, began in 2026. The renovation forced the museum to host events elsewhere.

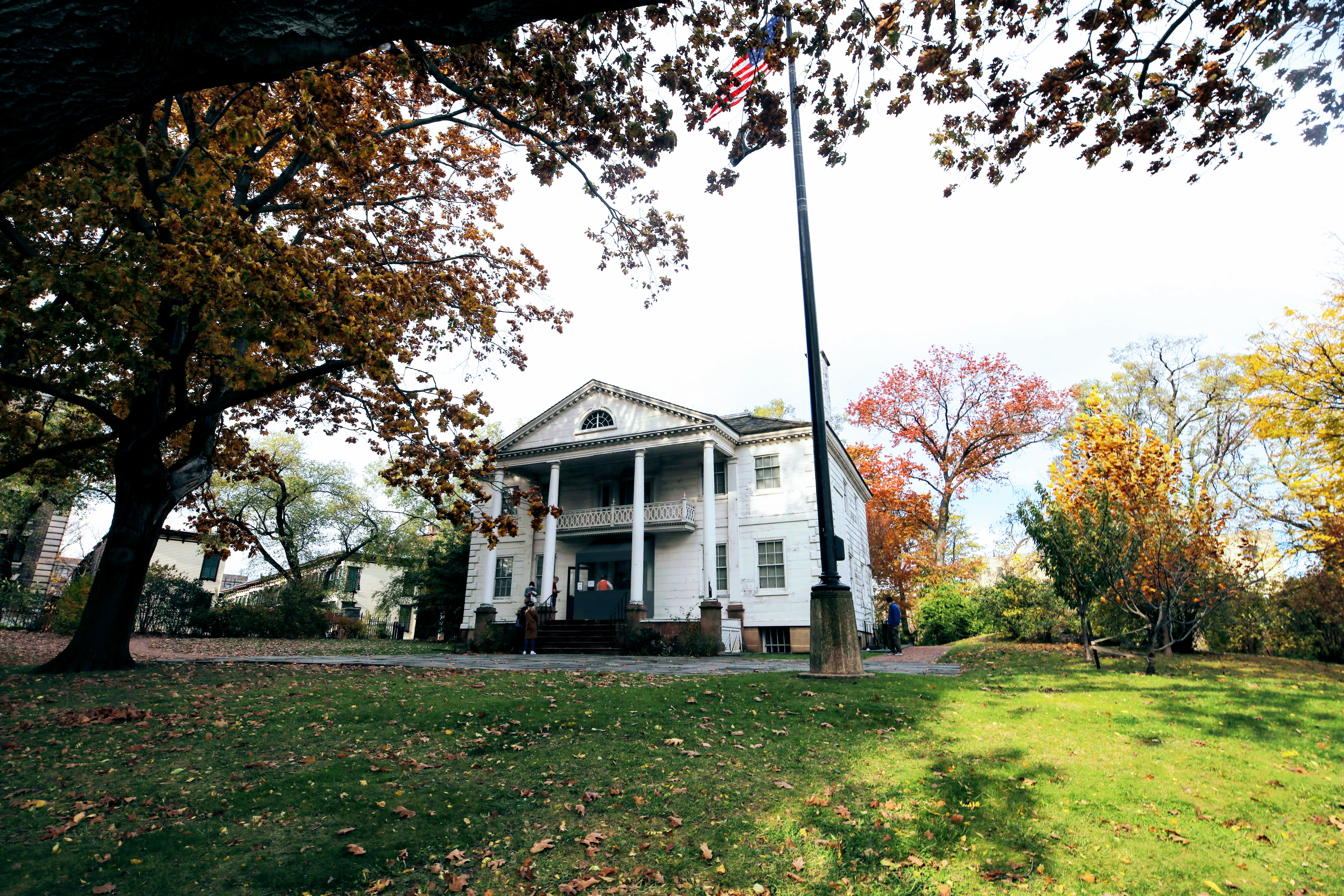
Morris–Jumel Mansion, with Sylvan Terrace rowhouses at left

== Architecture ==
The Morris–Jumel Mansion is an early example of Palladian architecture in the U.S.; the Toronto Star claimed that the mansion was the first Palladian-style structure in North America. It is not known who designed the mansion, but Morris may have been the architect of his own residence; his uncle had been a successful architect in England. Carpenters and masons from the area may have constructed the mansion. The exterior design was influenced by Palladio, a 16th-century Italian architect, while the interior was described as having a Georgian-style plan. The remodeling by the Jumels c. 1810 was in the Federal style. Twentieth-century news articles described the house as being designed in the Georgian style.

While other 18th-century waterfront mansions in New York City were oriented with their rears facing the river, the Morris–Jumel Mansion is oriented north–south, roughly parallel to the Harlem River. It predates the street grid, which was established by the Commissioners' Plan of 1811. The Morris–Jumel Mansion is the oldest surviving house in Manhattan. Because there is a caretaker's apartment in the house, it is also Manhattan's oldest building that is still technically in residential use. Additionally, the mansion has been described in The New York Times as one of Manhattan's oldest buildings of any kind.

=== Exterior ===
The mansion consists of two sections. The main house is two and a half stories high, including the half-height third story which is treated as an attic. There is a two-story octagonal annex with a drawing room at the rear of the mansion, which may be the first of its kind in the U.S. The annex is connected to the main mansion via a short passageway, nicknamed the "hyphen". The main house is cited as measuring 52.67 by 38.5 feet (16.05 by 11.73 m) across, while the "hyphen" measures about 8 by 6 feet (2.4 by 1.8 m). The rear annex is approximately 21 to 22 feet (6.4 to 6.7 m) wide and 30 to 32 feet (9.1 to 9.8 m) deep. A well was constructed to the northeast of the mansion in 1857, but there is no evidence of outdoor toilets or privies.

The structure was built with a wooden frame, with brick exterior walls to keep out the heat. The brick walls, measuring more than 2 feet (0.61 m) thick, are covered with white wooden siding that has a rusticated appearance. The corners of the house are decorated with vertical quoins, and a wooden belt course runs horizontally across the second floor. All of the facades are covered with planking except for the eastern wall of the main mansion, which is covered with shingles. Originally, the northern wall also used shingles, which were less expensive than the planking. At the bottom of the basement walls is a stone gutter measuring 22 inches (560 mm) wide. The windows are all of slightly differing sizes; one window has a scratch, created when one of Eliza Jumel's grandchildren scraped a diamond on the glass to determine whether the diamond was real.

The south facade of the main house has a double-height portico and triangular pediment supported by grand Tuscan columns. Although early historians claimed that the portico was added to the house in the 19th century, the portico was likely built along with the rest of the mansion. The New York Daily News called it the only portico in New York City to be built before the American Revolution. The portico originally overlooked New York Bay several miles away and spans half of the width of the house. The front door was surrounded by an ornately carved doorway. There are sidelight windows on either side of the doorway, above which is an arch with a semicircular fanlight; the fanlight was added by the Jumel family. Directly above the main entrance are a French door and a balcony on the second floor.

The main house has a hip roof with dormer windows, which is surrounded by a cornice with dentils. Part of the roof is flat and enclosed by a railing. The annex also has a hip roof. There are three asymmetrical chimneys: one each above the eastern and western walls of the main mansion and one above the annex. A gutter was installed on the roof in the early 19th century, replacing the basement gutters.

=== Interior ===
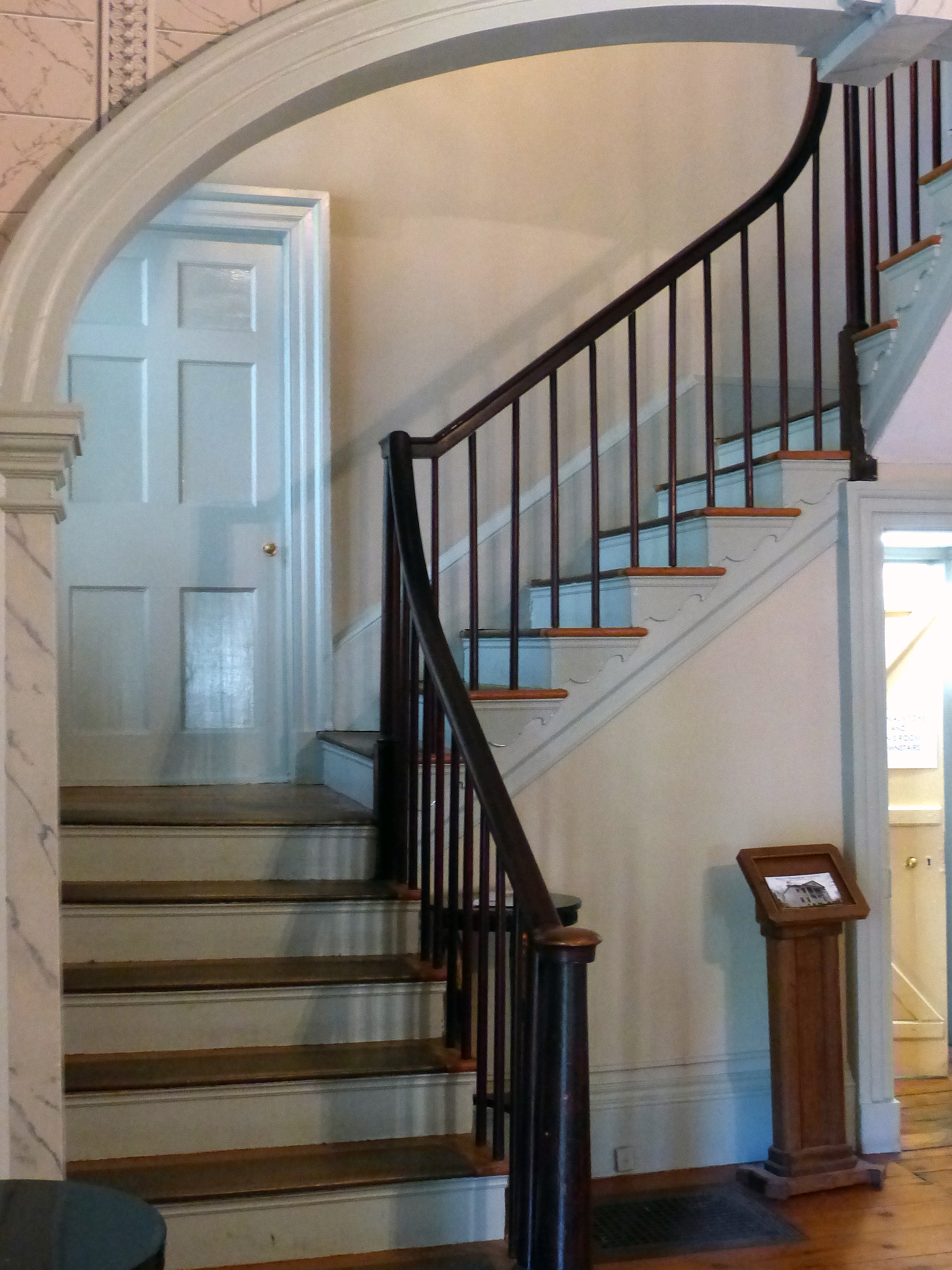
A staircase in the house

The New York Daily News cites the interior as covering approximately 12,000 square feet (1,100 m^{2}), while the New York City Department of City Planning cites the building's gross floor area as 4,860 square feet (452 m^{2}). Originally, the interior had a Georgian-style layout, old English-style main halls, and a relatively plain design that may be attributed to the rapid rate of construction. The layout is similar to that of other houses built before the American Revolution, with various Palladian halls. Including halls, there were originally 19 rooms. According to the New York City Landmarks Preservation Commission, the house has "some of the finest Georgian interiors in America". The earliest recorded account of the interior dates to an advertisement published in the New York Daily Advertiser in 1792. After Eliza Jumel died, the house was redecorated with contemporary 19th-century architectural details, and a kitchen was converted to a billiards room.

When the Morris–Jumel Mansion became a museum, it was re-furnished to reflect the decorations that existed when Morris, Washington, and Jumel occupied the mansion. The modern-day house is decorated with period furnishings and careful reproductions of period carpets and wallpaper. It features nine restored rooms, one of which was Washington's office. The dining room and Eliza Jumel's bedchamber, with a bed that supposedly belonged to Napoleon, are also open. Personal artifacts of Morris, Washington, Jumel, and Aaron Burr are part of the museum's collection. Throughout the house are semi-elliptical archways and molded cornices.

==== Basement ====
The basement was excavated out of solid rock and has partition walls measuring 1 foot (0.30 m) thick. It contained the servants' bedrooms and the kitchen. A 1792 advertisement in the New York Daily Advertiser noted that there was a kitchen, laundry, wine cellar, storeroom, pantry, servants' rooms, and dairy room. The smaller rooms, and the stairways to the first floor and the house's yard, led off the kitchen. When the mansion became a museum, part of the basement became a one-bedroom apartment for the house's caretaker, who lives there rent-free.

The kitchen originally measured 20 by 30 feet (6.1 by 9.1 m) across. The room, unusually large for the 1760s, had a wooden floor and plastered ceiling. To support the floor above, a 20-foot-long beam was placed above the center of the room, spanning the kitchen's width; this is the only piece of wood still visible on the ceiling Two 15-foot-long (4.6 m) beams were then laid above this beam, connecting to the walls on either side. On the kitchen's eastern wall is a protruding 9-foot-wide (2.7 m) brick fireplace with a chimney above it. During Washington's day, pots and kettles were hung from a wire that extended from the eastern wall to an iron pivot on the western wall (which, in turn, carried cookware to the upper floors). After the house's completion, a brick partition was added to keep the kitchen warm in the winter.

==== First floor ====
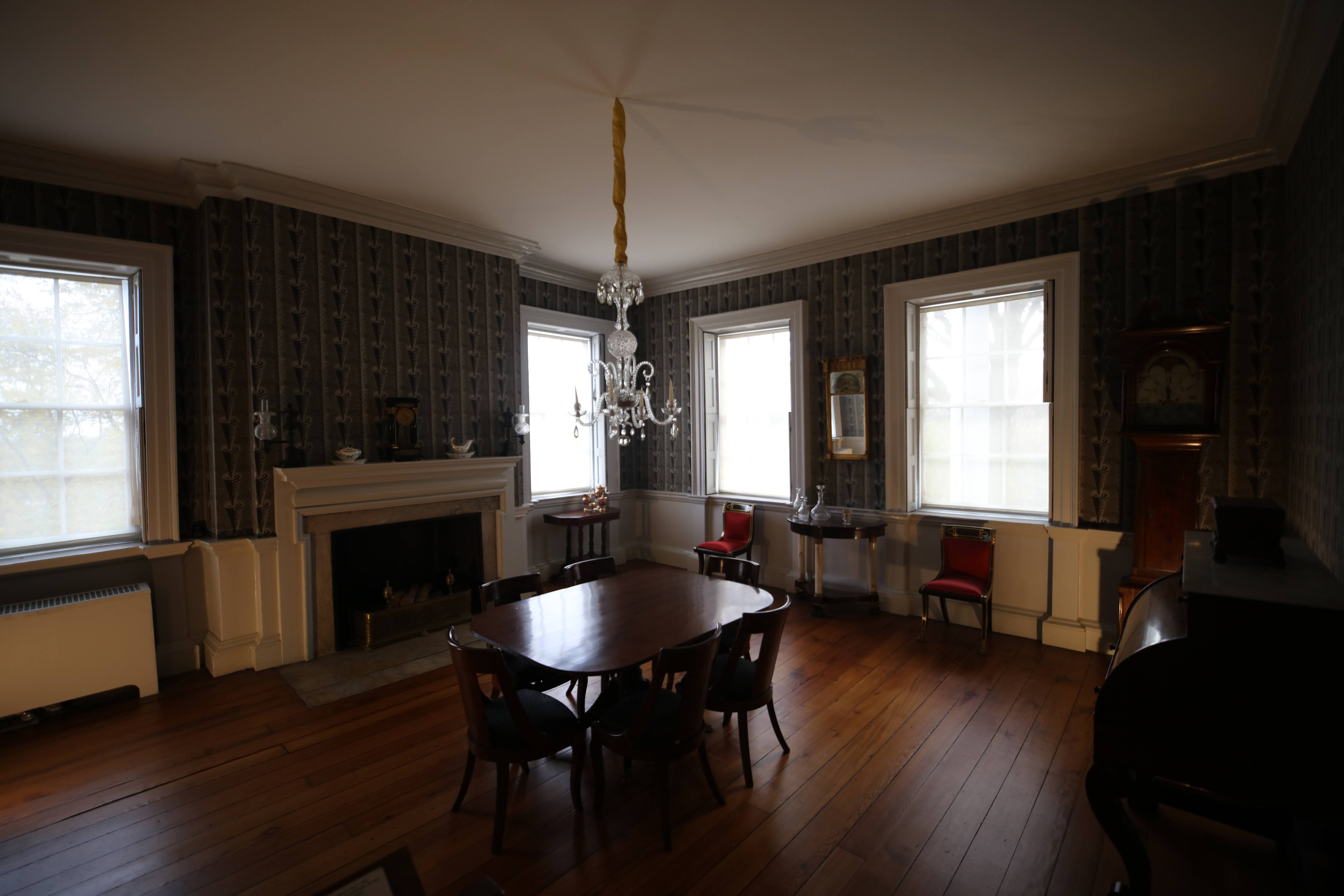
Dining room

The main entrance is through the center of the southern facade. It leads to an entrance hall in the front and a main hall behind it. The entrance hall and main hall form a single passageway leading to the octagonal annex in the rear; the halls are about 12 feet (3.7 m) wide. There are two large rooms on either side of the passageway.

To the left of the entrance and main halls are the parlor and the library, respectively. The parlor, sometimes referred to as the reception room and tearoom, is near the southwest end of the house. A source from 1901 cites the parlor as measuring 18 by 20 feet (5.5 by 6.1 m) wide. It is decorated with paneled window shutters, six-over-six sash windows, and cornice moldings. There is also a fireplace with a wood mantelpiece, marble frame, and mantle hearth; the fireplace does not have an overmantel, unlike similar houses from the period. The library, at the northwest end, has similar decorative detail, although the fireplace's hearth is made of brownstone. The library's original purpose is not known, but a 1792 advertisement called it "particularly adapted and fitted for a nursery". The fireplaces in the parlor and library both had "hob grates", installed around 1827 for burning coal.

To the right of the entrance hall, at the southeast end of the house, is a dining room. This space is designed in a similar manner to the parlor. A source from 1901 cites the dining room as measuring 18.33 by 24 feet (5.59 by 7.32 m) wide. There is a wide archway on the dining room's north wall, which leads to a narrow alcove, as well as a butler's pantry at the far eastern end. At the northeast end, to the right of the main hallway, is a small arch leading to the main stairway. The staircase itself has risers with scallop designs, as well as a handrail supported by narrow spindles. It is interrupted by two landings where the stair turns 90 degrees. At some point in the 19th century, there was a doorway separating the stairs from the main hall; this doorway was removed "some years" prior to 1916. There is a landing halfway up the staircase, which formerly had a door leading to the butler's pantry.

The octagonal drawing room in the rear has paneled shutters, cornice moldings, and six-over-six sash windows, like the other rooms. The walls also contain paneled wainscoting, which is not found anywhere else in the house; at the time of the mansion's completion, the walls were intended to be decorated with wallpaper. George Washington once used the octagonal drawing room as his headquarters. One account claimed that 200 Native Americans once gathered in the room to give Washington a wreath. Later on, Eliza Jumel set up a dais in the drawing room near the end of her life, where she would "see" imaginary guests with royal titles. In the late 19th century, it was furnished with gilded ebony furniture and a 24-arm brass-and-glass chandelier. A 1914 account cited the room as being decorated in the Louis XV style with Empire-style ceilings and fireplace. By the late 20th century, the drawing room had been redecorated with late-18th century details like Chinese wallpaper.

==== Second floor ====
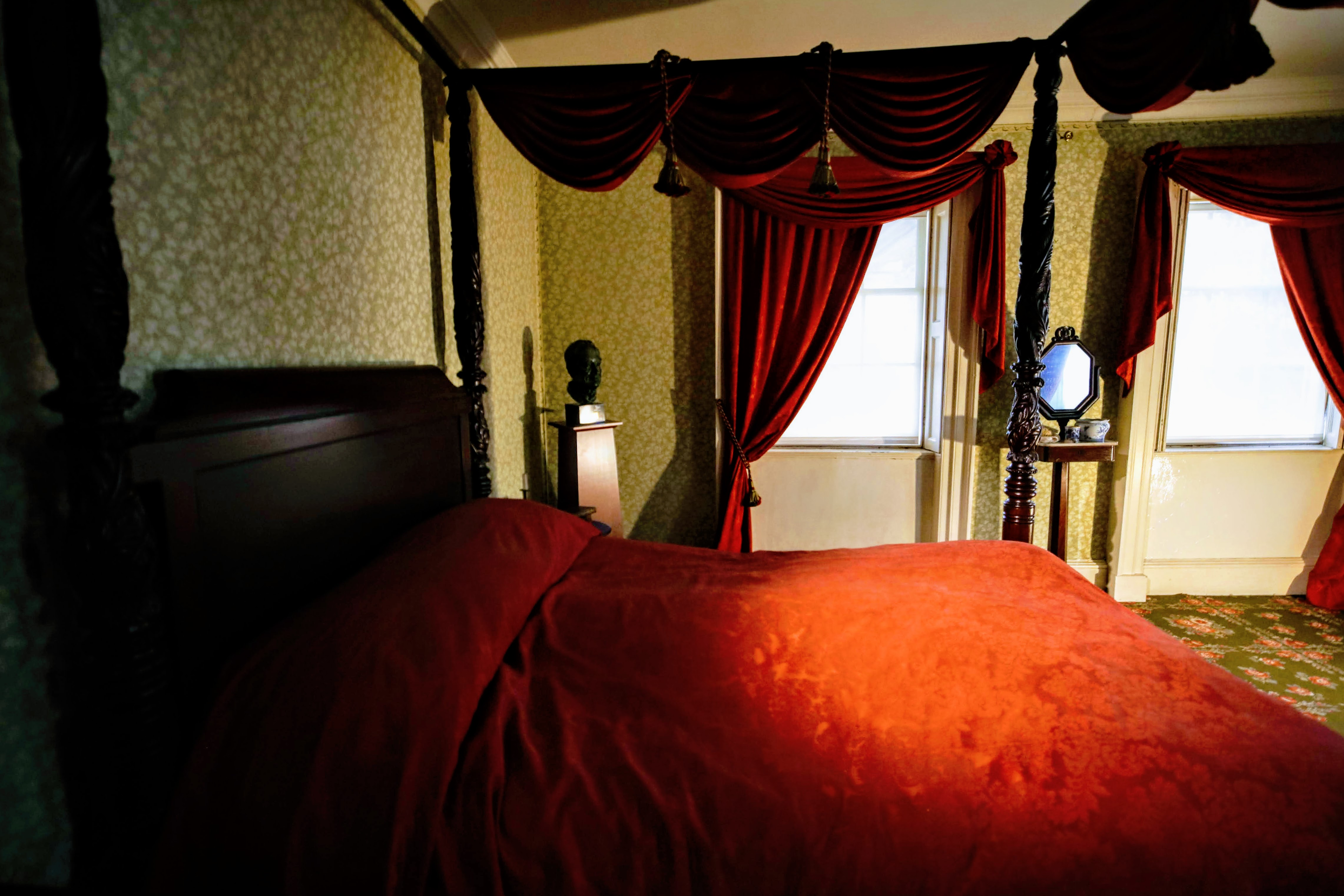
Aaron Burr's bedroom on the second floor

The 1792 New York Daily Advertiser advertisement indicates that the second floor was probably split up into seven bedrooms. The central section of the main house's second floor is divided into front and rear halls, similarly to the first story. The rooms to the northwest, southwest, and southeast were formerly used as bedrooms, and there is another bedroom in the octagonal annex. Following a renovation in 1945, these bedrooms were redecorated with objects belonging to Eliza Jumel, Mary Bowen, Aaron Burr, and George Washington.

At the southern end of the front hall is a Palladian window, with a French door leading to the balcony on the facade. The bedrooms are decorated similarly to the first-floor rooms, with fireplaces, molded cornices, paneled shutters, and three-over-six sash windows. The southeastern bedroom, which was likely Eliza Jumel's bedroom, is decorated with furniture and wallpaper in the Empire and Napoleonic styles. The southwestern bedroom was likely Aaron Burr's, while that to the northwest probably belonged to Mary Bowen. All of these rooms are decorated with 19th-century furnishings reminiscent of their respective occupants. The bedroom in the annex was originally divided into three sections and was used by Washington during the Revolutionary War. This room has several windows, as well as a marble hearth and fireplace mantel with embedded fossils.

==== Third floor ====
The third floor was originally devoted to guest bedrooms; according to the 1792 advertisement, there were five such rooms. By 1916, there were only three bedrooms. One of them had a fireplace without any mantel, which was probably used by servants. An archive and reference library is located on the house's third floor. The library is open only to the Friends of the Morris–Jumel Mansion.

== Operation ==
The New York City Department of Parks and Recreation owns the house. The museum is operated by Morris–Jumel Mansion Inc., a nonprofit organization established by the Washington Headquarters Association in 1904. The organization is dedicated to operating the house and curating exhibits and collections. The museum receives most of its funding through grants, revenue from events, and admission. As of 2014, the museum's annual budget averaged $250,000.

=== Collection ===
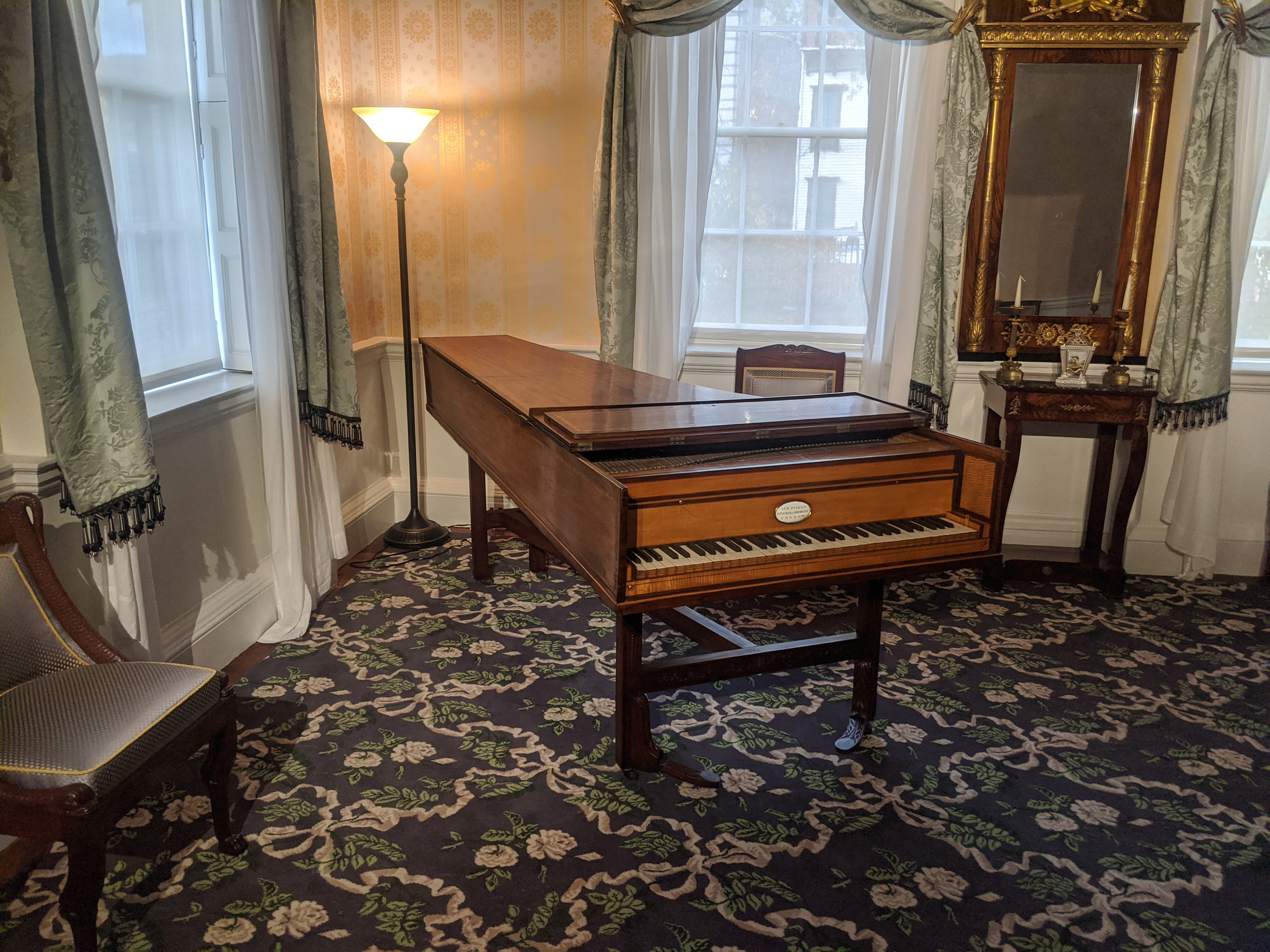
Piano in the drawing room

When the museum first opened, the New-York Tribune described the collection as having a Thomas Sheraton sofa with carved legs; pewter lamps and tankards; hand-carved four-poster bed frames; and a 19th-century woman's calash that resembled "a cross between a bagpipe and a flatboat". The collection also contained floors and fire irons from Revolutionary War soldiers' huts. According to a 1921 Christian Science Monitor article, the museum exhibited various late-18th-century relics such as coins, guns, prints, clothing, china, furniture, and a Bible belonging to Washington. Other wartime relics displayed during that time included a table, first-aid cabinet, clock, saddlebag, and cannon. The museum also displayed clothing and artifacts belonging to Eliza Jumel, as well as the collections of Reginald Pelham Bolton and William Lanier Washington. The second-floor bedrooms were decorated to reflect the lives of some of the house's previous residents.

Over the years, the museum has acquired numerous objects. These included a Masonic apron that may have belonged to Aaron Burr and two desks and chairs that he used. By the 1940s, the first-floor rooms contained decorations like Sheraton furniture. The second floor had mementos such as beds, chairs, a cot, gilt clocks, as well as Burr's desk, letters, and trunk of clothes. Some objects were borrowed from other museums, while other objects, including a bed formerly belonging to Eliza Jumel, were loaned from private collectors. A small first-floor room displayed Revolutionary–era relics excavated near the house, and the basement kitchen displayed cookware. A New York Times article from 1985 said that the museum had such varied artifacts as a chandelier from Napoleon and a laundry list for Washington. The museum continued to expand its collection in the late 20th century, acquiring three pairs of the house's original giltwood eagle wings in 1989.

In the late 20th and early 21st centuries, the Morris–Jumel Mansion was still decorated with a variety of objects used by the Morrises, Washington, the Jumels, and Burr. The furniture collection consists of pieces designed by Thomas Sheraton, Thomas Chippendale, and Duncan Phyfe. The house also retained other artifacts such as its porcelain collection, Eliza Jumel's bed, and French wallpapers.

=== Temporary exhibits ===
In addition to the permanent collections, there have been several temporary exhibits throughout the years. In the museum's early years, it hosted exhibits such as a display of American Revolutionary War-era objects and a display of objects manufactured by women. The house displayed mementos relating to Washington in the 1940s. During the 1980s, it also hosted an exhibit for the bicentennial of Washington's inauguration and a series of miscellaneous artifacts on the third floor. In the 21st century, the museum presents temporary exhibits on a regular basis. These included a 2009 exhibit on the history of the house itself; a 2012 exhibit with pieces from the 18th and 19th centuries, and a 2022 exhibit of historical portraits of Washington Heights.

=== Events and programs ===
The museum hosted annual lawn parties and Washington's Birthday holiday celebrations in the early 20th century. In its early years, the museum also presented events such as lectures on the house's history; receptions hosted by the Washington Headquarters Association; and meetings of the WHA and the Daughters of the American Revolution. During the mid-20th century, its events included a celebration of Washington's bicentennial; Flag Day ceremonies; and Revolutionary War reenactments. The mansion hosted open houses and storytelling series in the 1970s, and museum officials began allowing visitors to host parties at the mansion in 1977, except for weddings and bar or bat mitzvahs.

By the late 20th and early 21st centuries, the mansion regularly presented lectures, concerts, and special exhibits. Events in the 1980s and 1990s included a play about Eliza Jumel's life; a neighborhood residents' "block social"; a food, craft and music festival; Historic House Festivals; "Jazz at the Mansion" festivals; and Easter egg hunts. During the 2000s and 2010s, the mansion hosted outdoor jazz concerts, the Early Music Celebration, and suppers themed to the Founding Fathers' cuisine. Its past programs have included a children's workshop for designing model rooms, as well as walking tours every Saturday. The museum also has hosted anniversary celebrations for the house. Its 225th anniversary was marked by a festival with duels, concerts, and storytelling, while its 250th anniversary in 2015 was celebrated with a Halloween festival.

The museum presents several regular programs of its own. For example, it hosts ghost tours and regular "paranormal investigations", taking advantage of the fact that the mansion was rumored to have up to five ghosts, including those of Burr and Eliza Jumel. Once a month, Family Day events are presented at the mansion, and the museum hosts online "parlor chats". There are workshops at the mansion, as well as plays and art shows.

== Impact ==
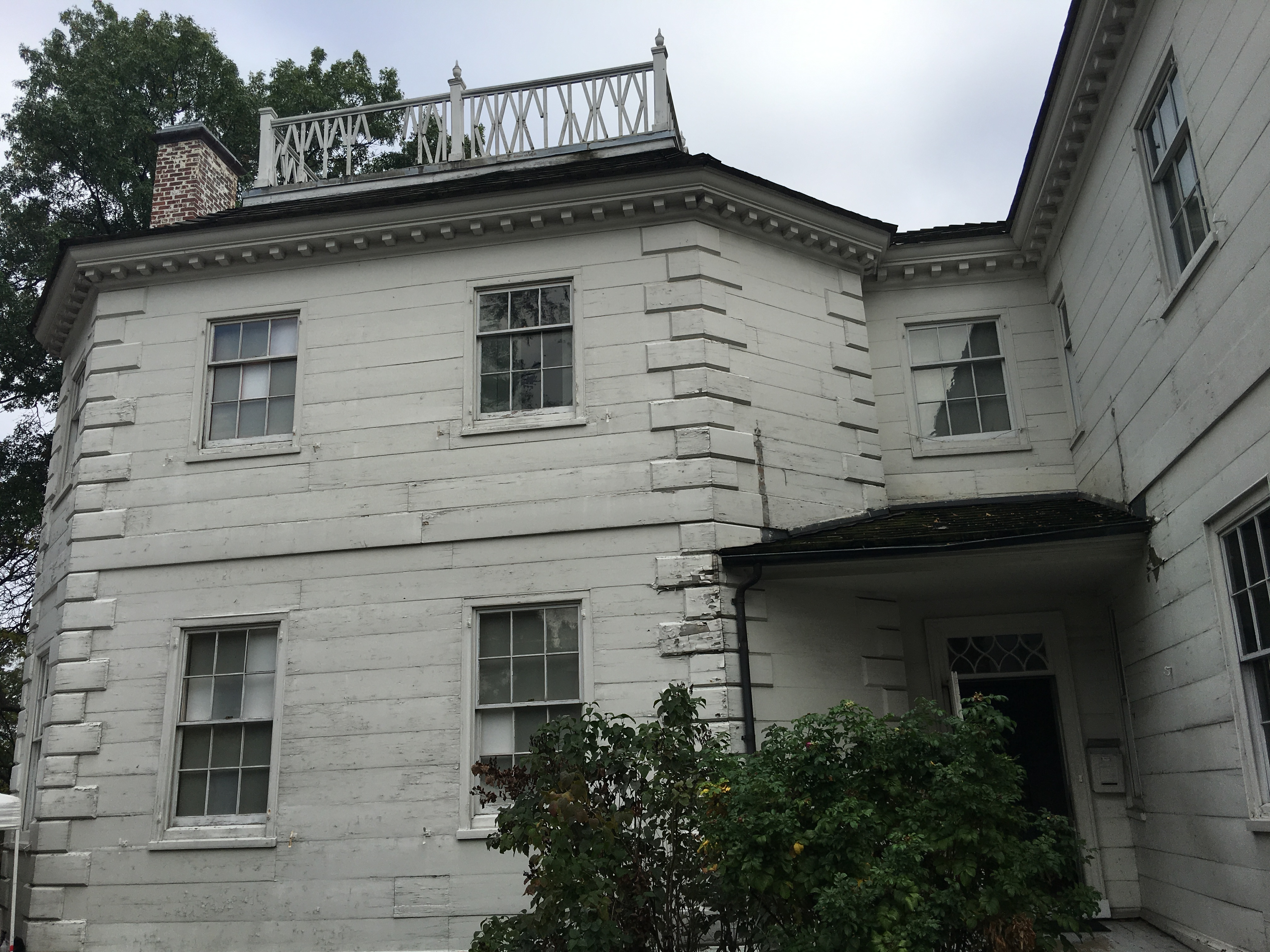
Woodwork on the western facade

=== Critical reception ===
In 1881, The New York Times wrote that "it is a treat to see a house occasionally that is a little different from its neighbors" and that the Morris–Jumel Mansion was one such structure. A Washington Post writer said in 1885 that the house "looks to be fifty years old, instead of 150", because the exterior was frequently repainted. The same writer compared the size of the entrance hall to a mid-sized barn. The Washington Post noted the house's historical significance as early as 1897. Josiah Collins Pumpelly wrote in 1903 that the house "still remains a conspicuous monument of the taste and ambitious aspirations of those who lived during the infancy of the Commonwealth". The next year, the Buffalo Evening News said that, although the Earles had modified the house significantly, the rooms were still recognizable as examples of early architecture.

The Christian Science Monitor wrote in 1921 that there was evidence of the builders' workmanship in the mansion's design, and Chesla Sherlock wrote in 1925, "The interior is very interesting and exhibits greater perfection in detail than the average colonial mansion". William F. Lamb, one of the Empire State Building's architects, called the mansion "one of the most impressive sights in New York". A writer for The Spur said in 1936 that "the visitor sees not merely a building but a structure warm with memories of New York's dear dead days", and a critic for the Christian Science Monitor said in 1945 that the house stood "four-square and benevolent in the mellow gold of autumn". A 1987 New York Times article described it as the center of "a delightful enclave", and the Washington Post called the house "one of those places where you can lose all sense of time and place". Another Times writer called the house "a pleasingly shabby-genteel Colonial pile" in 2001. The jazz musician Duke Ellington, who lived across the street, referred to the mansion as "the Crown of Sugar Hill", a reference to the nearby Sugar Hill area.

There has also been commentary about the museum's collections. The New York Daily News said in 1968 that Eliza Jumel's lifestyle was reflected in the furnishings, crystal, and china. A Times reporter said in 2003 that the museum was a "worthwhile detour" from other attractions in Washington Heights. The Wall Street Journal called the mansion one of "Manhattan's sometimes overlooked cultural gems" in 2014, and the Times said in 2018 that the museum retained the 17th-century character of the house. A writer for Insider wrote in 2022 that, despite the presence of a modern Ring doorbell at the entrance, walking into the house "felt like stepping back in time".

=== Landmark designations ===
The Morris–Jumel Mansion's historical importance had been recognized as early as 1914, when the New York City Art Commission took pictures of the mansion and other notable sites across the city; at the time, cameras were still relatively uncommon. The mansion was also documented as part of the Historic American Buildings Survey in the 1930s, and the New York State Education Department erected two signs outside the house in 1935, summarizing the structure's history. It became a National Historic Landmark in 1961, making it one of the first landmarks designated as such. The Morris–Jumel Mansion was added to the National Register of Historic Places on October 15, 1966, the day the National Historic Preservation Act of 1966 went into effect. The exterior was designated a New York City Landmark in 1967. The mansion became part of the city-landmarked Jumel Terrace Historic District in 1970, and it was added to an NRHP district of the same name in 1973. In 2025, it was added to the Dominican Historic District, also on the NRHP.

The LPC held hearings in 1975 to determine whether the interiors of Federal Hall's rotunda, the Morris–Jumel Mansion, and the Bartow–Pell Mansion should be designated as landmarks. The LPC designated all three buildings' interiors as landmarks on May 26, 1975, and the New York City Board of Estimate ratified these designations that July. The first and second floors of the Morris–Jumel Mansion were protected by the designation.

=== Media ===
The house has been associated with popular media as early as the 19th century, when it reportedly inspired a mansion in James Fenimore Cooper's 1821 novel The Spy. Later in the century, Fitz-Greene Halleck wrote his lines on the Greek patriot Marco Bozzaris on a rocky outcrop near the mansion overlooking the Harlem River. Rupert Hughes's 1924 novel The Golden Ladder was partly set in the mansion. In 1996, the Morris–Jumel Mansion was featured in Bob Vila's A&E Network production Bob Vila's Guide to Historic Homes of America. In the modern day, it has been investigated as a haunted house on the Today Show, Haunted USA, and Ghost Adventures. Lin-Manuel Miranda wrote portions of Hamilton at the Morris–Jumel Mansion in 2015, and the television show Broad City filmed a scene at the mansion in 2019.

The house itself has also been depicted in other exhibits. For example, it was featured in New-York Historical Society's 1952 exhibition of pre–Civil War houses in New York City, and artifacts from the mansion were displayed in the lobby of 1095 Avenue of the Americas in 1979. In addition, a room in the Lord & Taylor Building was decorated in 1976 with furnishings resembling that of the mansion's rooms. Over the years, the mansion has been the subject of several historical studies, such as William Henry Shelton's 1916 book detailing the mansion's history.

== See also ==
- List of museums and cultural institutions in New York City
- List of New York City Designated Landmarks in Manhattan above 110th Street
- List of National Historic Landmarks in New York City
- List of Washington's Headquarters during the Revolutionary War
- National Register of Historic Places listings in Manhattan above 110th Street
- Whitehall (Annapolis, Maryland), another pre-Revolutionary house in the Thirteen Colonies with a temple portico
