= Tibbetts Brook (disambiguation) =

Tibbetts Brook may refer to the following waterways:

- Tibbetts Brook (Minnesota)
- Tibbetts Brook (New York)
- Tibbetts Brook Park
