= Van Cortlandt House =

Historic house in the Bronx, New York

- U.S. National Register of Historic Places
- U.S. National Historic Landmark
- New York State Register of Historic Places
- New York City Landmark
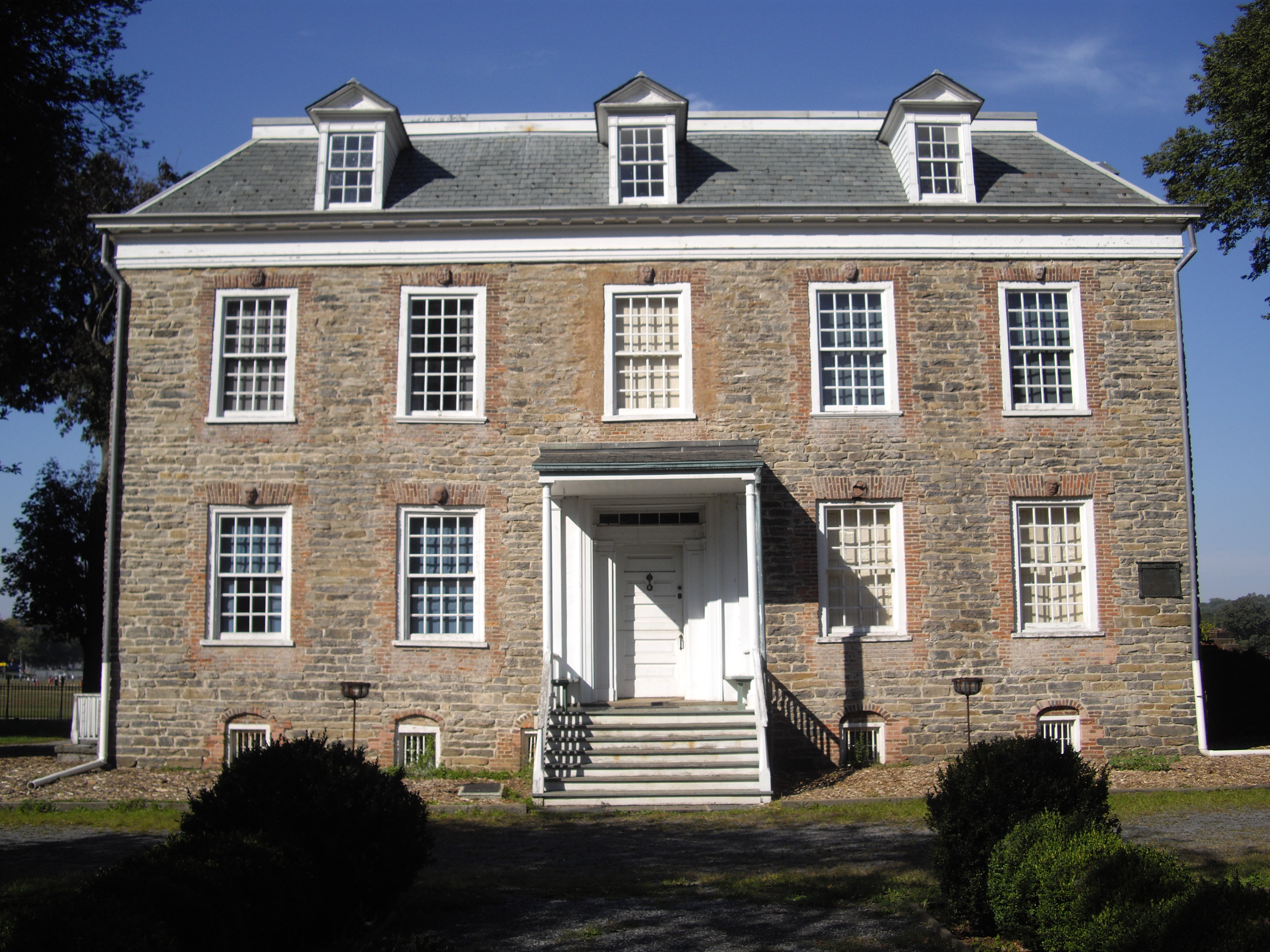
- The mansion in 2008

- Location within New York City Location within New York Location within the United States
- Interactive map of Van Cortlandt House
- Location: Van Cortlandt Park, Bronx, New York City
- Coordinates: 40°53′28.1″N 73°53′41.4″W
- Area: 192 acres (78 ha) (protected area around house)
- Built: 1748
- Architectural style: Georgian
- NRHP reference No.: 67000010
- NYSRHP No.: 00501.000009
- NYCL No.: 0127, 0890

Significant dates
- Added to NRHP: December 24, 1967
- Designated NHL: December 24, 1976
- Designated NYSRHP: June 23, 1980
- Designated NYCL: March 15, 1966 (facade); July 22, 1975 (interior)

The Van Cortlandt House, also known as the Van Cortlandt Mansion, is the oldest known surviving house in the Bronx in New York City. It is located in the southwestern portion of Van Cortlandt Park. The house is operated as a historic house museum known as the Van Cortlandt House Museum. Built by Frederick Van Cortlandt and completed in 1749, the house is a 2 1/2-story Georgian building with a rubblestone facade and Georgian-style interiors. It served as a residence of one branch of the Van Cortlandt family for 140 years before it reopened as a museum in 1897.

The house is built on an estate that Jacobus Van Cortlandt acquired in the 1690s. Frederick began constructing the building in 1748, although he did not live to see its completion, and Frederick's son James inherited the house. During the American Revolutionary War, both British and American troops variously occupied the house; the structure was passed down to various members of the Van Cortlandt family through the 19th century. The city government acquired the house in 1888 as part of the construction of Van Cortlandt Park and initially used the building as a police barracks. The Society of Colonial Dames of the State of New York leased the house in 1896 and opened it to the public on May 28, 1897. Various modifications were made to the grounds over the subsequent decades, and a caretaker's house was built in the 1910s. The house underwent renovations in the 1960s and 1980s.

The original house is L-shaped, with wings to the south and east; the caretaker's house to the north is attached to the rest of the structure. The mansion has a largely plain facade, except for brick keystones that depict Van Cortlandt family members' faces. The interiors include a kitchen in the basement; two parlors, an entry hall, and a dining room on the first floor; and bedrooms on the second and third floors. The museum has historically presented various performances and events at the house, and it operates tours and educational programs. Critics have praised both the museum's exhibits and the house's architecture. The house's facade and interior are New York City designated landmarks, and the building is a National Historic Landmark.

== Site ==
The Van Cortlandt House is located at the southwestern corner of Van Cortlandt Park, near the Riverdale neighborhood of the Bronx in New York City. It is surrounded by the park's Parade Ground to the north, the Memorial Grove to the west, a swimming pool and the Van Cortlandt Stadium to the south, and a burial ground and Van Cortlandt Lake to the east. The nearest street is Broadway to the west; the New York City Subway's Van Cortlandt Park–242nd Street station is located on Broadway just outside the park.

The Van Cortlandt House's site was a salt marsh along Tibbetts Brook until the 1690s, when the nearby Van Cortlandt Lake was formed along the brook's course. When the house was built in 1748, it stood on the eastern slope of a set of hills along the eastern bank of the Hudson River. The house and surrounding landscape are preserved as part of Van Cortlandt Park, although the fields around the mansion date from the Parade Ground's construction in the late 19th century. The grounds overlooked the Spuyten Duyvil valley to the south, the Palisades to the west, and Tibbetts Brook to the east; the view to the south was interrupted by hills in Fordham, Bronx, and in Manhattan.

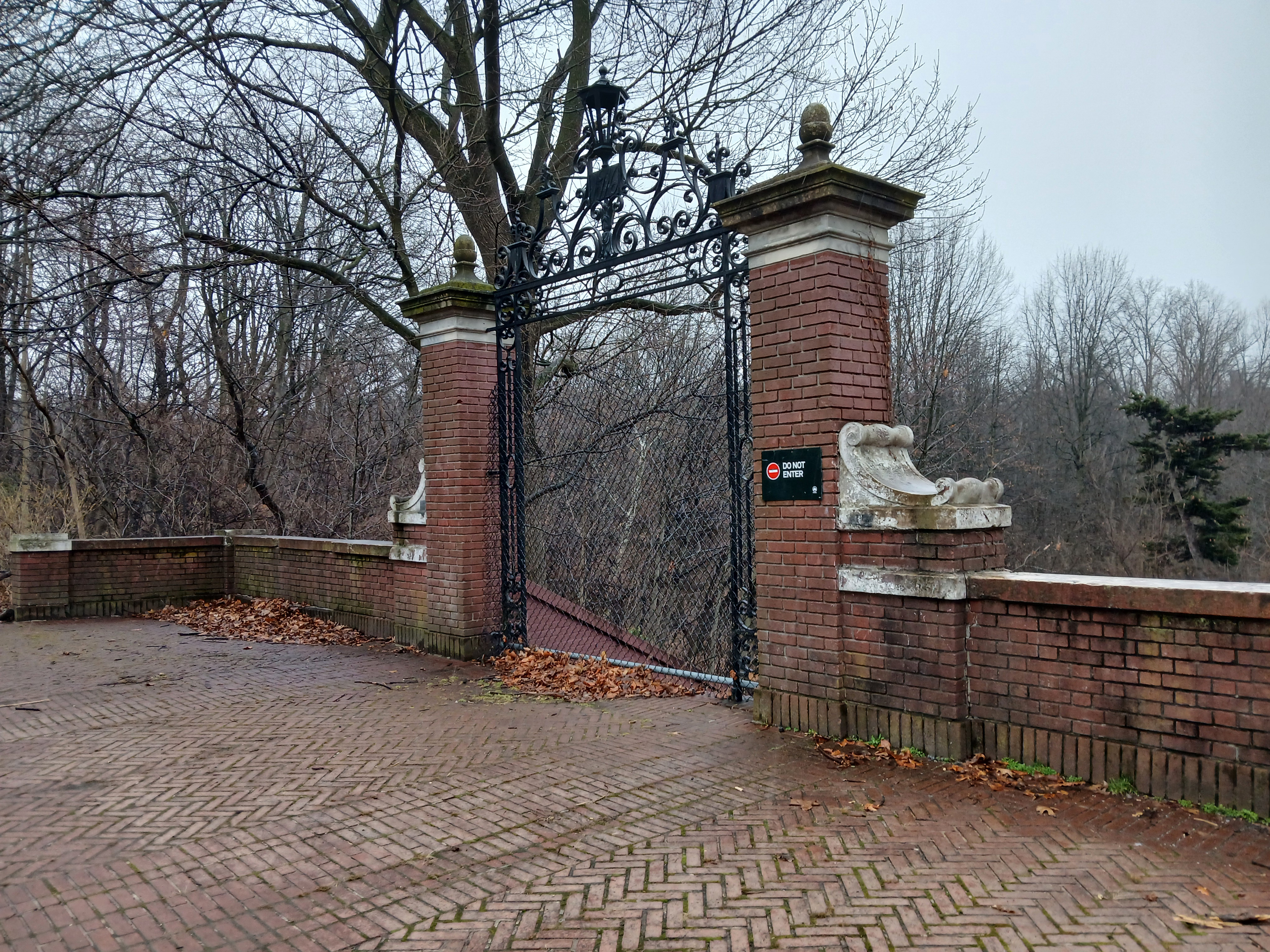
Entrance gate south of the house

Originally, there was a driveway from the side entrance to the front entrance. The driveway was paved with stones, so the house's occupants could hear visitors on the driveway before they arrived. The house's approach is flanked by gateposts that were once topped by wooden bird sculptures; these sculptures were later moved into the house. There were horse chestnuts on either side of the gateposts. The grounds surrounding the house were landscaped in what the historian Mary Lanman Ferris called "the Dutch manner of gardening". These included manmade terraces, large box trees, and water features such as fountains. The mansion was also surrounded by large old-growth trees. In the early 1900s, a Dutch garden was built just south of the mansion, with a canal on three sides, a fountain in the center, and four square sections around it. The garden has since been replaced with trees and a herb garden.

== History ==
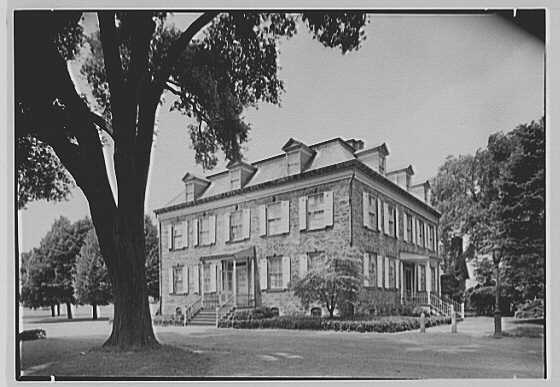
View of the house from the southwest

Prior to European settlement, the Lenape Native Americans occupied the site of the Van Cortlandt Mansion, and there was a nearby Native American village known as Keskeskick. Adriaen van der Donck, a Dutch settler, was the first European to occupy the Van Cortlandt House's site, having bought the land from the Dutch West India Company in 1646. Van der Donck died in 1655. Following the takeover of New Netherland by the British in 1664, the claim to the estate was awarded to van der Donck's brother-in-law, Elias Doughty, who proceeded to sell off the portions of the property. Doughty sold a 2,000-acre (810 ha) tract, including the site of the Van Cortlandt House, to Frederick Philipse, Thomas Delavall, and Thomas Lewis. Philipse bought out Delavall's and Lewis's land shares, making the land part of the expansive Philipsburg Manor. When Philipse's wife died, he remarried the daughter of Dutch brewer Oloff Stevense Van Cortlandt, herself a widow. Philipse's daughter Eva later married Jacobus Van Cortlandt, who was Olof's son and Philipse's second wife's brother.

Jacobus Van Cortlandt acquired parcels from Philipse through 1699 and dammed Tibbetts Brook to create Van Cortlandt Lake. He and his wife largely lived in Manhattan but used the estate as a plantation in the early 18th century. The property's proximity to Tibbetts Brook, which drained into the Harlem River and Spuyten Duyvil Creek to the south, made it easy for Van Cortlandt to ship grain and timber products by water. In 1732, Van Cortlandt acquired an additional parcel from the Tippett family. The estate was passed in 1739 to Jacobus's son Frederick Van Cortlandt. When Frederick inherited the land, the site was considered part of lower Yonkers in Westchester County. Horses, oxen, cattle, hogs, sheep, and hens roamed across the farm, while crops such as flax and fruits were grown there. Several slaves also worked on the plantation.

=== Residential use ===
The Van Cortlandt House is the oldest known surviving house in what is now the Bronx, (Note: The Hadley House in nearby Riverdale may have been finished in 1747, but there is no documentation to definitively prove this.) as well as one of three surviving 18th-century buildings in the borough. Along with the Bartow–Pell Mansion, it is one of two remaining manor houses in the Bronx.

==== 1740s to 1770s ====
Frederick began developing the Van Cortlandt House on the property in 1748. According to the Van Cortlandt House Museum, Frederick likely did not build the house himself, despite being credited as the builder. Frederick's family used the Tippett house while their new structure was being built. The mansion was built in a vale that the historian Robert Bolton described as "about one mile north from Kings bridge", (Note: The King's Bridge carried Broadway over Spuyten Duyvil Creek and no longer exists.) next to what is now Broadway. One descendant wrote that the mansion was probably built on the site of, or close to, Van der Donck's farmhouse; the foundation of Van der Donck's old house remained intact in front of the Van Cortlandt House. East of the mansion was a mill dam across Tibbetts Brook, a small mill, and the Van Cortlandts' previous residence. To the northeast of the mansion were woodlands. In Frederick's will, signed on October 2, 1749, he indicated that the house was almost complete.

Frederick died before the house was finished, and he bequeathed the estate to his son, Jacobus (James) Van Cortlandt. His bequest also included either 11 or 12 slaves who worked on the plantation. Vault Hill, the Van Cortlandt family burial ground to the north of the mansion, was created in 1749, and Frederick was interred there. After its completion, the Van Cortlandt House was often called the manor house, although this was a misnomer, as the "manor" name applied to the Van Cortlandt Manor in Croton-on-Hudson, New York. The mansion was also called "Lower Cortlandt's" to reduce confusion with Frederick Van Cortlandt's farm, "Upper Cortlandt's", west of Broadway.

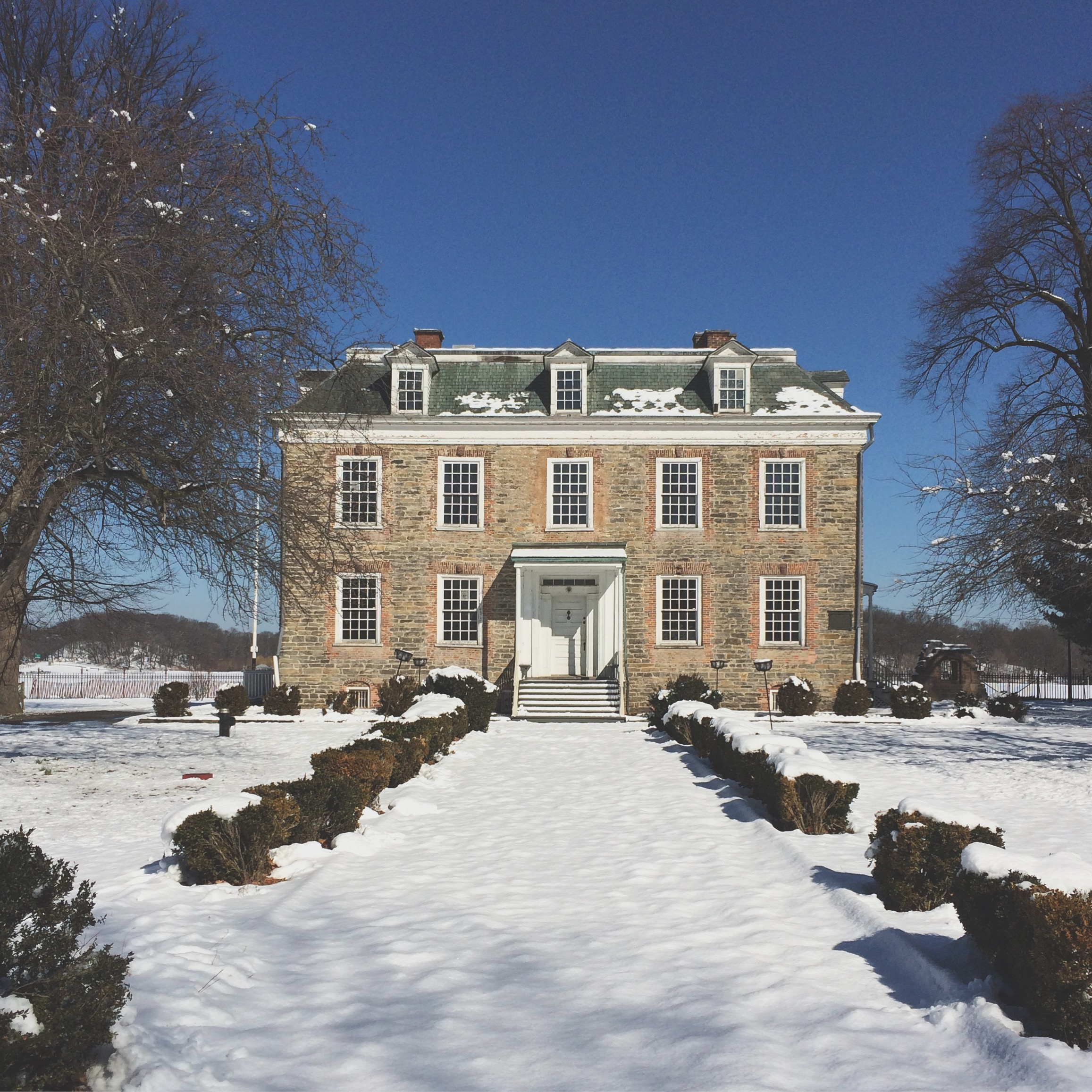
View of the house in the winter

The family used the grist mill and saw mill next to the lake. Within the house, the family salted the pork and beef; cured the ham and bacon; and stored the various fruits that grew on the premises. The Van Cortlandts did not primarily live in that house, instead staying in Manhattan most of the time. Two early historians wrote that James Van Cortlandt frequently intervened on behalf of neighbors who had been robbed. The family often invited civilian and military officials to the mansion, serving lobsters from the Long Island Sound and hams from the estate's grounds. Slaves performed many of the tasks around the house, including laundry, cleaning, and cooking.

==== Revolutionary War ====
The Van Cortlandt family land was part of the "Neutral Ground" during the American Revolutionary War and was used by both the Loyalists and the Patriots. On May 30, 1775, the New York Provincial Congress placed James Van Cortlandt on a committee to create a report on whether it was feasible to build a fort near his family's house. Although James was described as not having been "a very active loyalist", he was not fully committed to the Patriots' cause either, and the Van Cortlandts wished to stay neutral. Augustus Van Cortlandt hid city records under Vault Hill to protect them during the war, turning them over to the new American government afterward. Some members of the Van Cortlandt family continued to reside at the mansion during most of the war.

The grounds were used by Patriot militia leaders Comte de Rochambeau, Marquis de Lafayette, and George Washington. The house itself was Washington's headquarters after his troops were defeated in the 1776 Battle of Long Island, and Washington stayed at the house prior to the Battle of White Plains. After Washington's troops were defeated in the Battle of White Plains, British General William Howe made the house his headquarters on November 13, 1776, placing it behind British-held ground. Hessian troops had pillaged the mansion before Howe's arrival, and various documents were as such scattered. Royal Navy admiral Robert Digby occasionally invited the future British King William IV to the mansion during the war, and Digby gifted Augustus Van Cortlandt a pair of wooden bird sculptures that had been taken from a Spanish privateer. American troops unsuccessfully tried to retake the house in 1777. A British captain surnamed Rowe was severely wounded in a battle nearby in 1780, and he died in the house just after his fiancée arrived, giving rise to rumors that Rowe's ghost haunted the house.

James Van Cortlandt moved away during the war because of his poor health, and he died in 1781. Because James had no children, his younger brother, New York City Clerk Augustus Van Cortlandt, took over the property. Washington returned to the house in 1781 to strategize with Rochambeau while their troops waited outside on what is now the Parade Ground and Vault Hill. Although Washington had wanted to scout British forts in Upper Manhattan, his troops instead headed south to Virginia, defeating the British in the siege of Yorktown. Washington lit campfires outside the house to deceive the British into thinking that his troops were still on the grounds. Washington used the house one final time in 1783 after the Treaty of Paris. The British had just withdrawn their troops from Manhattan, and Washington and George Clinton were getting ready to enter the island, stopping over at the house before doing so.

==== Late 18th and 19th centuries ====
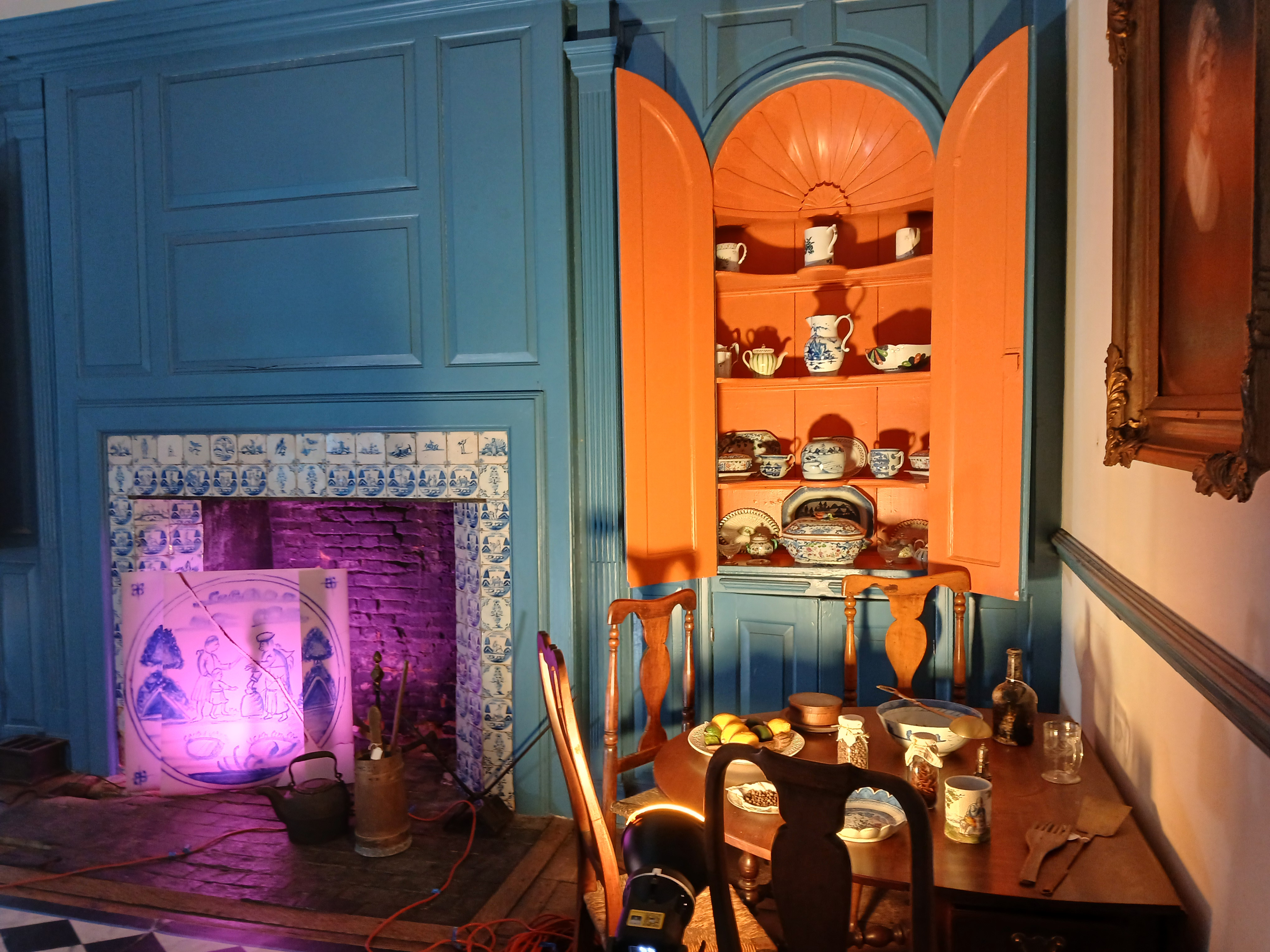
A cupboard, fireplace mantel, and furniture inside the mansion's western parlor

Augustus Van Cortlandt's family moved to the house after the Revolution ended. The 1790 United States census shows that Augustus Van Cortlandt kept 17 slaves on the property. Augustus, his wife, another woman, and 10 slaves were recorded as living on the estate in 1800. The census of 1810 showed that Augustus's household consisted of six free people and 15 slaves; at the time, the farm may have still been operated as a plantation. Augustus Van Cortlandt continued to own the house until he died in 1823; he had no male children to which he could pass down the house. As such, his son-in-law Henry White (who had married Augustus's daughter Anna) received his life estate, and Henry's son Augustus White was allowed to have the house if he changed his surname to Van Cortlandt.

Augustus White Van Cortlandt moved the mill on the estate to the shore of Van Cortlandt Lake in 1823. The estate's slaves were freed in 1827, when slavery in New York became illegal. The younger Augustus owned the house until his death on April 1, 1839, upon which he bequeathed the house to his brother Henry White Van Cortlandt, who had no children and survived only until October 1839. Neither Augustus White nor Henry White had male heirs, so the house was to pass to their sister's son Augustus Bibby Van Cortlandt upon Henry's death. Augustus Bibby owned the house for four and a half decades; (Note: Although Bankoff, Winter & Ricciardi 1992, p. 3, hints that Bibby lived until 1850, a New York Times obituary indicates that he died in 1912.) he renovated the mansion and farmed much of the estate. The fireplaces were trimmed back to make way for stoves. An account from the late 1840s described the house as having a front garden with box trees, which had been planted upon a set of fountains. The old mill and the Van Cortlandts' original house still existed on the estate, and the house's interior was decorated with various portraits.

New York City annexed the southern part of Westchester County in 1874, and the Van Cortlandt estate became part of the Bronx. The Van Cortlandts were looking to sell their land by the 1870s because of the area's increasing urbanization. In June 1884, New York governor Grover Cleveland signed the New Parks Act into law, authorizing the creation of a system of parks in the Bronx, including what would become Van Cortlandt Park. The act gave the city the right to acquire 700 acres (280 ha) from Augustus Bibby via eminent domain. Legal disputes over the act carried on for years. The Van Cortlandt family did not fully vacate the house until 1888, and the mill next to Van Cortlandt Lake was in use until 1889. Records indicate that the family held events in the house as late as 1890, when Augustus Bibby Van Cortlandt married Ethyle Wilson there. The New York Herald Tribune described the house and surrounding property as having "for generations symbolized the vast wealth in real estate amassed by Oloff and Jacobus Van Cortlandt".

=== Use as museum ===
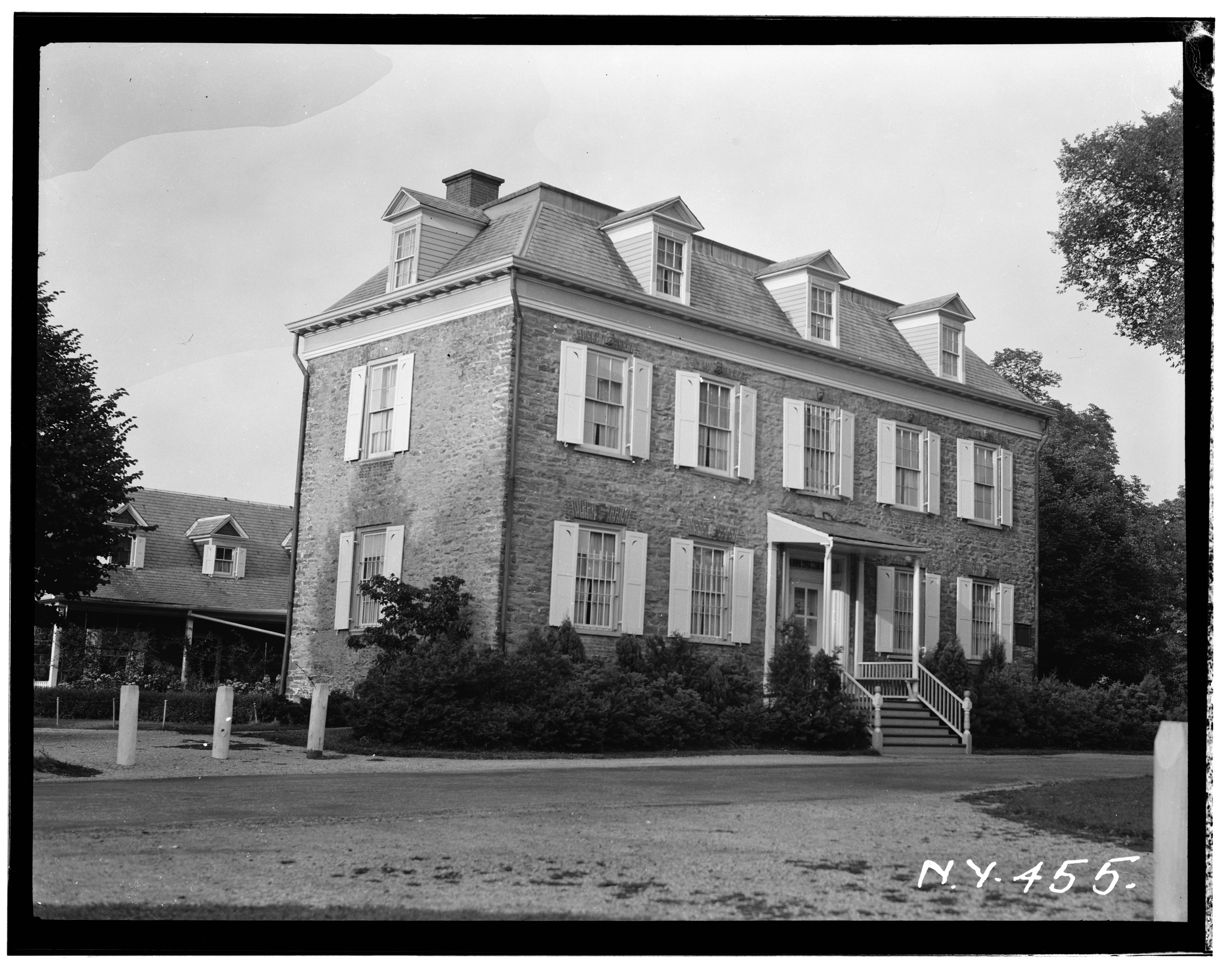
View from the southwest

A portion of the Van Cortlandt estate was sold to the government of New York City on December 12, 1888, and converted into Van Cortlandt Park; other properties on the estate were not sold until 1919. The majority of the grain fields were converted into a sprawling lawn dubbed the "Parade Ground", while the Van Cortlandt House was preserved. Parts of the mansion were repaired and repainted in 1889. For several years thereafter, the family of the house's caretaker were the only residents, and military officers used the house once a year during field day activities in the park. Until 1896, the mansion also served as a barracks for the New York State Police, which had been assigned to guard the bison that roamed Van Cortlandt Park. The New York City Police Department and the New York National Guard used the house as well, and the bison themselves stayed there until they were moved to the Bronx Zoo.

==== Creation and early years ====
One of New York City's park commissioners proposed in March 1893 that the mansion be converted into a museum for Revolutionary War artifacts. The park commissioners provided $187 for interior painting and papering in December, and they provided $250 for renovation work the next month. The city's Park Board voted in 1894 to add an inscription honoring Washington to the mansion. In early 1896, the Society of Colonial Dames of the State of New York applied to the park commissioners for permission to repair the mansion and operate it as a historic house museum. The New York State Legislature had given the society control of the mansion by that May. The Park Board agreed in December 1896 to lease the mansion to the society; the initial lease lasted for 25 years. The society then began renovating the house. The project, which cost between $4,000 and $5,000, involved restoring the house to its original condition.

The Colonial Dames took over the mansion on May 27, 1897, and opened the house to the public on that date. At the time, the Van Cortlandt Mansion was one of a few old residences preserved on public grounds in New York City, along with Gracie Mansion. It was also one of the first historic house museums in the city; it was followed by other residences such as the Morris–Jumel Mansion, King Manor, and Dyckman House. The Van Cortlandt Mansion was one of the few mid-18th-century buildings in New York City that still retained its original carpentry. The museum was open to the public every day of the week and was free most of the time. On Saturdays, it charged each guest 25 cents to raise money for the house's maintenance.

A colonial garden around the house was approved in May 1897 and announced to the public that July. New York City park superintendent Samuel Parsons Jr. began constructing the colonial garden that August at a cost of $50,000, and the New York City Board of Estimate allocated $15,000 that October for the garden. The Colonial Dames dedicated a tablet outside the mansion, which described the house's history, in late 1900. At the time, the museum had recorded more than 50,000 visitors over the previous four years. The next year, the old mill used by the Van Cortlandt family was destroyed by lightning. A statue of National Guard major-general Josiah Porter was dedicated behind the house in 1902, and the colonial garden adjacent to the mansion was completed in 1903. A window from the old Rhinelander Sugar House was brought to the Bronx in 1903 and installed next to the mansion. By 1908, the mansion was easily accessible from the rest of the city via the New York City Subway's Van Cortlandt Park–242nd Street station.

==== 1910s to 1970s ====
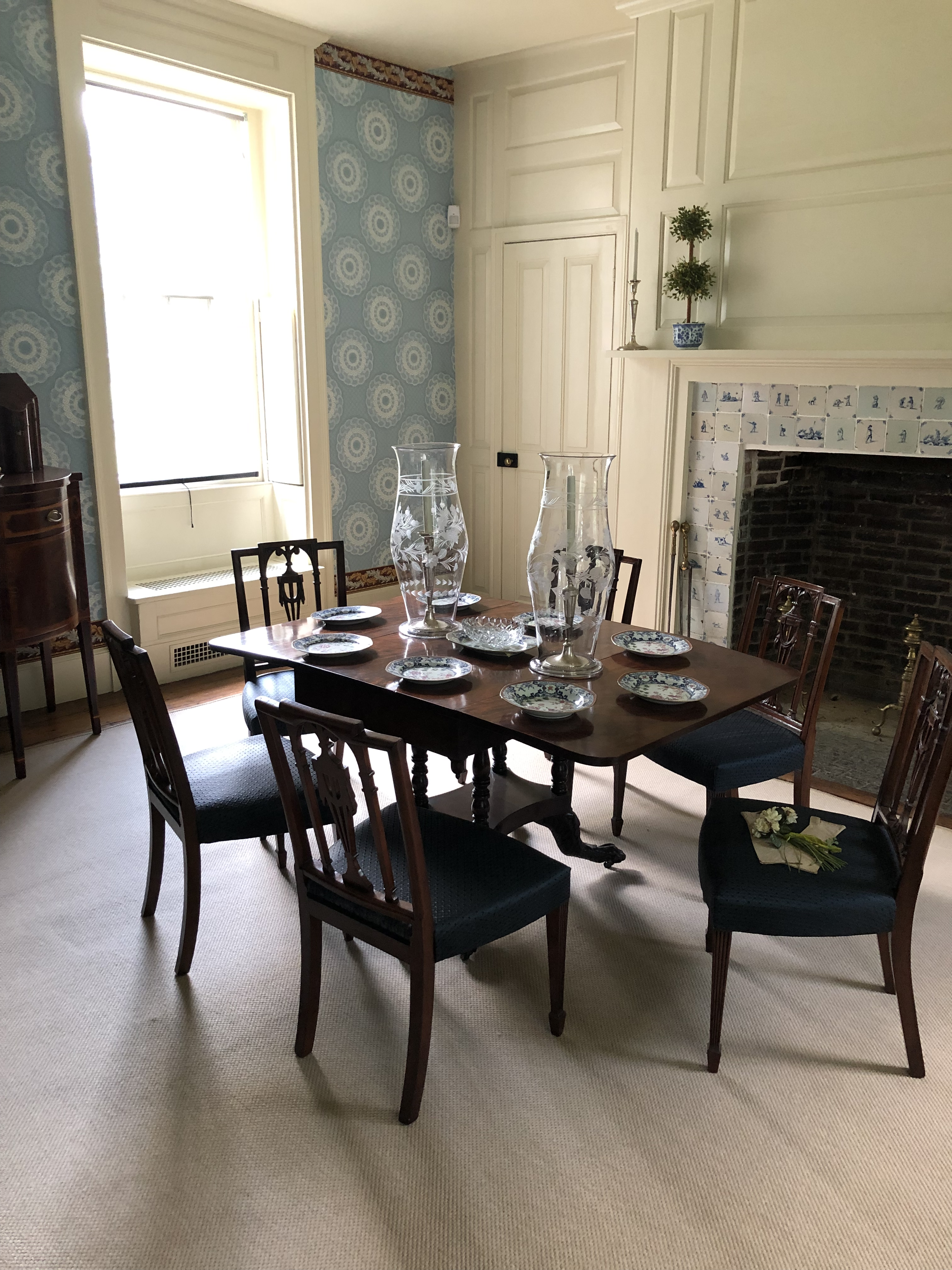
The mansion's formal dining room

The Colonial Dames began raising money in the early 1910s for an expansion of the museum's collection. The Dames also announced plans to build an annex to the house, but Park Board landscape architect Charles Downing Lay vetoed these plans in April 1912. The New York City Department of Parks and Recreation (NYC Parks) received bids for the annex's construction in 1913 but initially rejected all of them. After a subsequent contract was approved, annex, consisting of a caretaker's apartment adjacent to the main house, was finished in 1916 or 1917, just before World War I. The Department of Parks awarded a contract for repairs to the house at the end of 1914. The architect Norman Isham was hired to renovate the mansion, which included restoring the fireplaces, adding paneling, moving the radiators, and installing interior shutters. By the late 1910s, the museum was charging admission fees on Thursdays; although the museum no longer charged a fee on Sundays, it had shorter operating hours on that day.

By the early 1930s, the Van Cortlandt House saw 50,000 to 60,000 visitors each year, including many foreign-born visitors. A walnut tree was planted in front of the mansion in 1938, replacing an older tree underneath which Washington had once stood. The guns outside the Van Cortlandt House were scrapped in 1942 after then–parks commissioner Robert Moses found that the weaponry was "of neither historic nor esthetic value". The New York Herald Tribune reported in the mid-1940s that the Van Cortlandt House had 100,000 annual visitors. NYC Parks announced plans in 1953 to install an iron fence around the mansion at a cost of $26,424; the fence had been relocated from the median of Delancey Street in Manhattan. During the late 1950s, a group led by New York State Assembly member Mildred F. Taylor found that the building was still in good condition.

After various members of the Colonial Dames provided donations "to make the mansion a more authoritative eighteenth-century home", the Colonial Dames closed the Van Cortlandt House in December 1960 for what was supposed to be a four-month renovation. The house's reopening was delayed by two months to June 1961. This renovation involved restoring the walls and the original floors, as well as upgrades to the caretaker's apartment and mechanical systems. The house was still open seven days a week in the 1960s, charging admission four days a week, but was only open on weekends by the 1970s. It had several caretakers during this time. A poet, Hagop Yacoubian, began caring for the house in 1959, shortly after coming to the U.S. from Armenia. Robert and Ann Porter, who were hired as the museum's caretakers in 1973 following a chance meeting with one of the museum's directors, sometimes hosted private parties in the house when the museum was closed. By the mid-1970s, the Bronx County Historical Society was also involved in the house's maintenance, although the Colonial Dames still operated the house and provided decorations and furniture.

==== 1980s to present ====
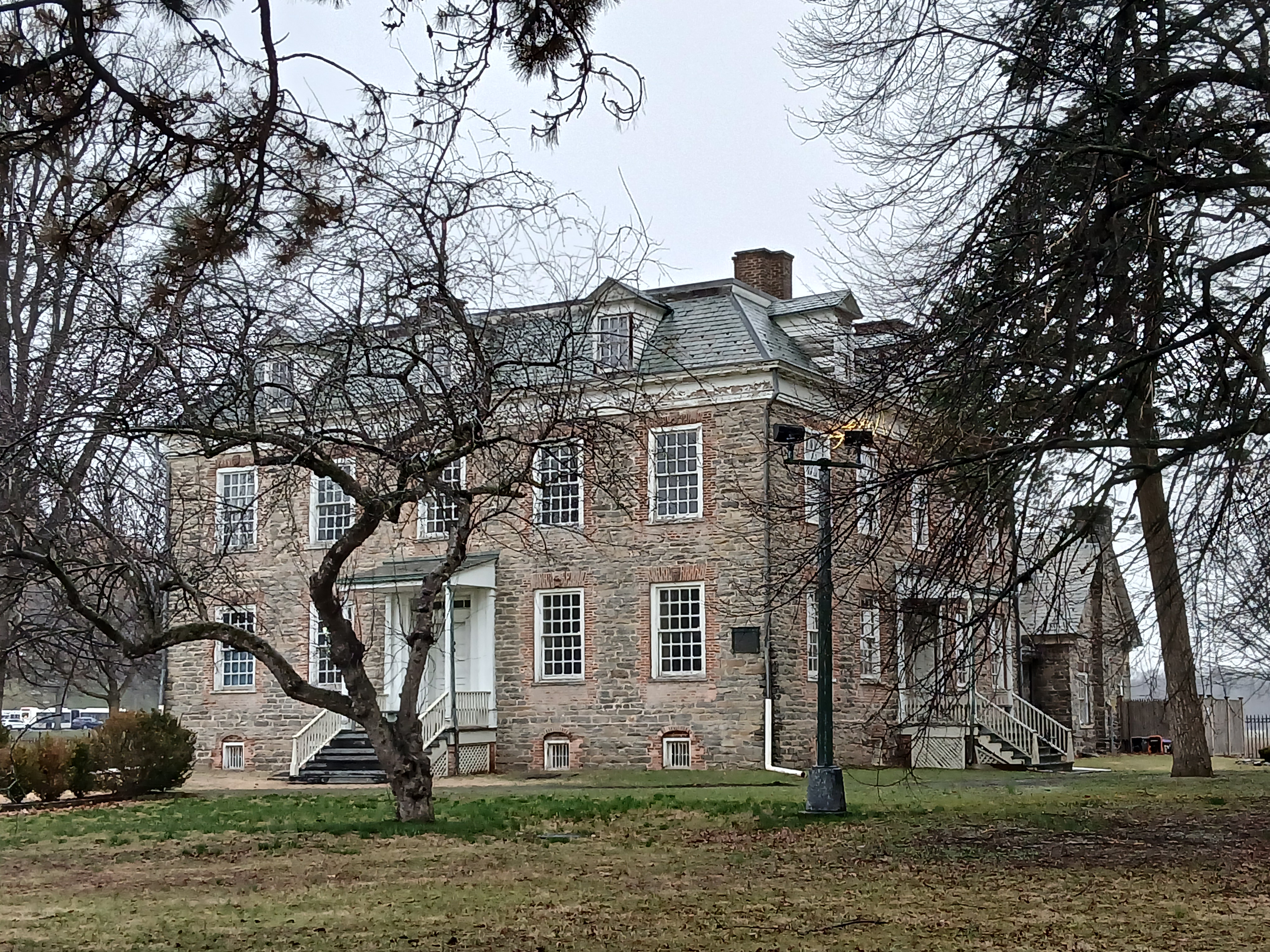
View from the southeast

The grounds of the house were landscaped during 1980, and the house itself was closed in 1986 for a renovation. The work included a new 150-seat auditorium under the house; an expansion of the cellar for taller guests; new bathrooms; and mechanical, structural, and fire-safety upgrades. In addition, the parlors were repainted in their original colors. The renovation, which cost $571,900, reopened in December 1988 to celebrate Van Cortlandt Park's 100th anniversary. The Van Cortlandt Mansion was one of the founding members of the Historic House Trust, established in 1989. At the time, the house's roof needed to be replaced. By the early 1990s, the house was open five days a week and charged admission fees at all times. Students from Brooklyn College conducted excavations around the house's site between 1990 and 1992. After a set of tennis courts were proposed east of the mansion in the 1990s, preservationists raised concerns that the tennis courts would ruin views from the house and destroy historical artifacts, though the courts were approved anyway.

By the mid-1990s, some rooms had peeling paint or water damage, and there were concerns that the furniture had bug infestations. The museum's director Laura Carpenter Correa wanted to renovate the house for $1 million, and the house's roof was to be repaired with $250,000 from the New York City Council and the Bronx borough president's office. However, there was no funding for further repairs, and the museum had only a $100,000 annual operating budget. Carpenter also doubled as the house's caretaker and continued to direct the museum through the early 21st century. The Van Cortlandt House had outdated mechanical systems, and, although Carpenter was allowed to live in the house rent-free, the city admonished her for trying to add a satellite dish. The Colonial Dames was still operating the Van Cortlandt House Museum in the early 21st century.

Brooklyn College students undertook further archeological excavations at the site in 2003, and the house was open six days a week during the 2000s. The house's dining room was restored in 2015; the work involved a restoration of the paneling, wallpaper, and fireplace tiles. The mansion was closed in 2020 due to the COVID-19 pandemic in New York City, and it reopened next year for self-guided tours. The house's communications systems were refurbished in 2022, and the fence around the house was rebuilt between 2024 and 2025.

== Architecture ==
The house, designed by an unknown architect, is built in the Georgian style and is 2 1/2 stories tall. It was reportedly based on Philipse Manor in Westchester County. The house has an L-shaped plan, with wings extending along the south and east sides. The southern wing was probably completed first, followed by the eastern wing. A lean-to was added to the house in the 19th century, while a caretaker's apartment (adjacent to the main house) dates to before World War I.

=== Exterior ===
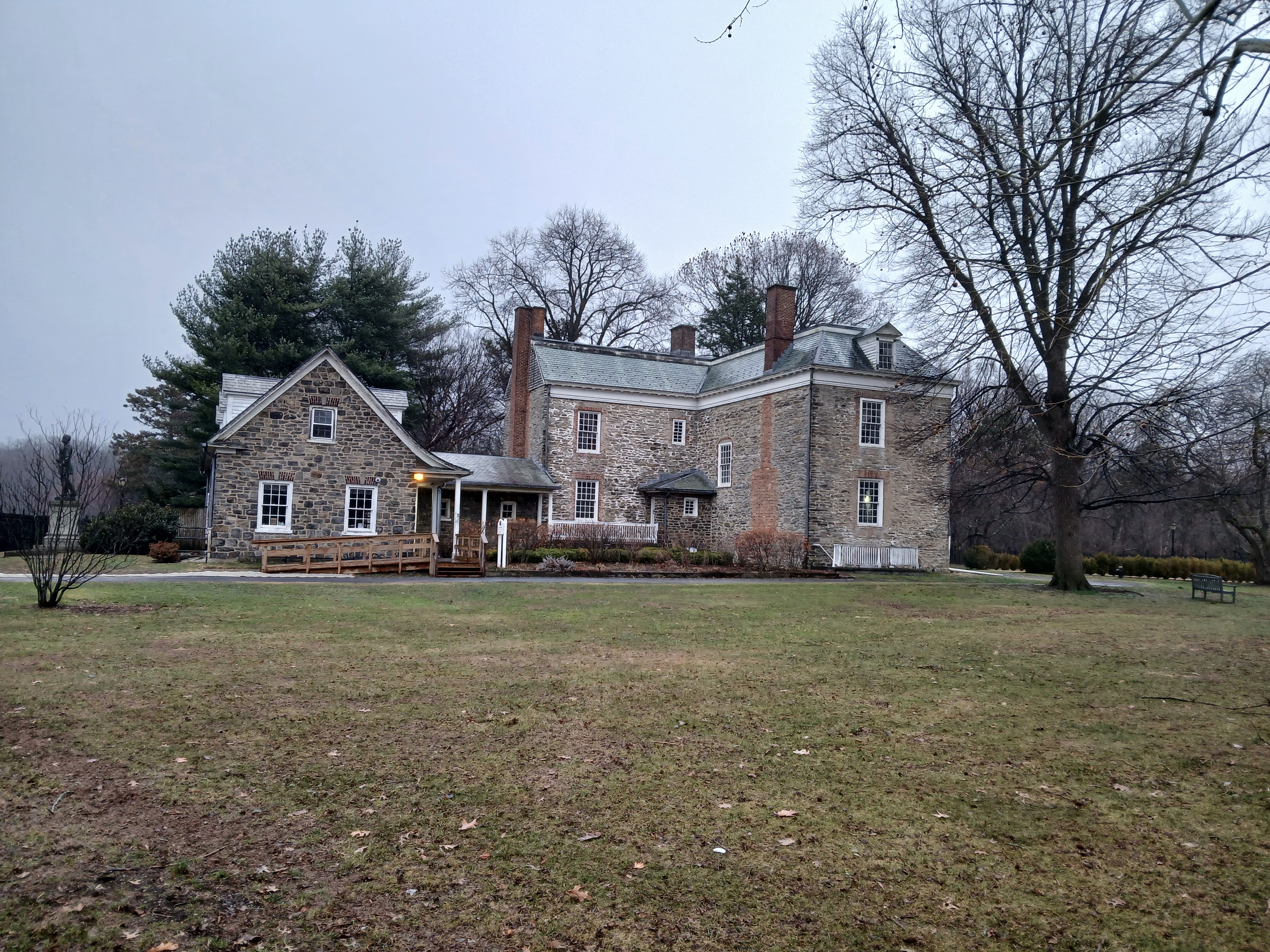
The main house (right) and its caretaker's apartment (left), seen from the west

The house is built of dressed fieldstone. Late-19th-century sources describe the house as having a rubblestone facade. One corner of the house contains a cornerstone bearing the year 1748. The first story is raised above the ground, so there are several entrances with wooden porches, each of which contains a small stoop with railings. The original doors were replaced with Dutch-style doors at some point in the house's history. The exterior of the house largely lacks elaborate decorations. Despite the paucity of ornate ornamentation, one descendant, Catharine Van Cortlandt Mathews, wrote that the design "suggests to a large degree the substantial comfort of the era which it represents". Next to the original L-shaped structure is the caretaker's apartment, which also has a rubblestone facade and brick window frames. The caretaker's apartment occupies the northern portion of the grounds, creating a C-shaped structure.

The window openings are surrounded by brick frames and contain sash windows with twelve panes over twelve. The original windows were transparent but, by the end of the 19th century, had gained the appearance of ground glass. The windowsills were incorporated into the outer walls, and the sills on the second story are of a slightly different design from those on the first story. There are keystones above the windows, which contain carvings of grotesque masks. The grotesques bear various facial expressions, and each mask has a distinct design, representing a different Cortlandt. Local historian William Arthur Tieck said that the bricks were laid so the highest-quality brick faced outward, while ordinary brick faced inward. According to the National Park Service, the Van Cortlandt House was the only structure in the area that used grotesque masks as decoration, although Mathews cited the decorations as having been common in the Netherlands.

At the top of the facade is a cornice that supports a protruding soffit. The underside of the soffit has modillions set at wide intervals. The main house is capped by a mansard roof with a slate surface; there are no railings or decks above the roof. Seven dormer windows protrude from the roof: three facing east, one facing west, and three facing south. Each dormer contains a six-over-six sash window, and there is a triangular pediment above each window. The house contained multiple brick chimney stacks, similar to manors in the Hudson Valley. At the time of the house's construction, not many houses used multiple stacks, but this arrangement allowed heat to be provided to the majority of rooms.

=== Interior ===
In general, the interior has a Georgian-style design and layout, and the rooms had fireplaces on their north walls and windows on at least one of the other three walls. Elaborately carved woodwork is used throughout the house, and there are several fireplaces with Dutch tiles.

Unlike other urban mansions, but typical of rural estates, the formal entertaining rooms (such as the dining room and parlors) were placed on the first floor. The rear of the house had a service wing, where servants could move about without guests noticing. As built, the first story's southern wing had an entrance hall flanked by two parlors, while the eastern wing had a side hall and dining room on that story. The second floor is generally designed in a simpler style than the first floor but is also arranged in an L-shaped plan. The caretaker's apartment has seven rooms, including a kitchen and two bathrooms.

==== Basement ====
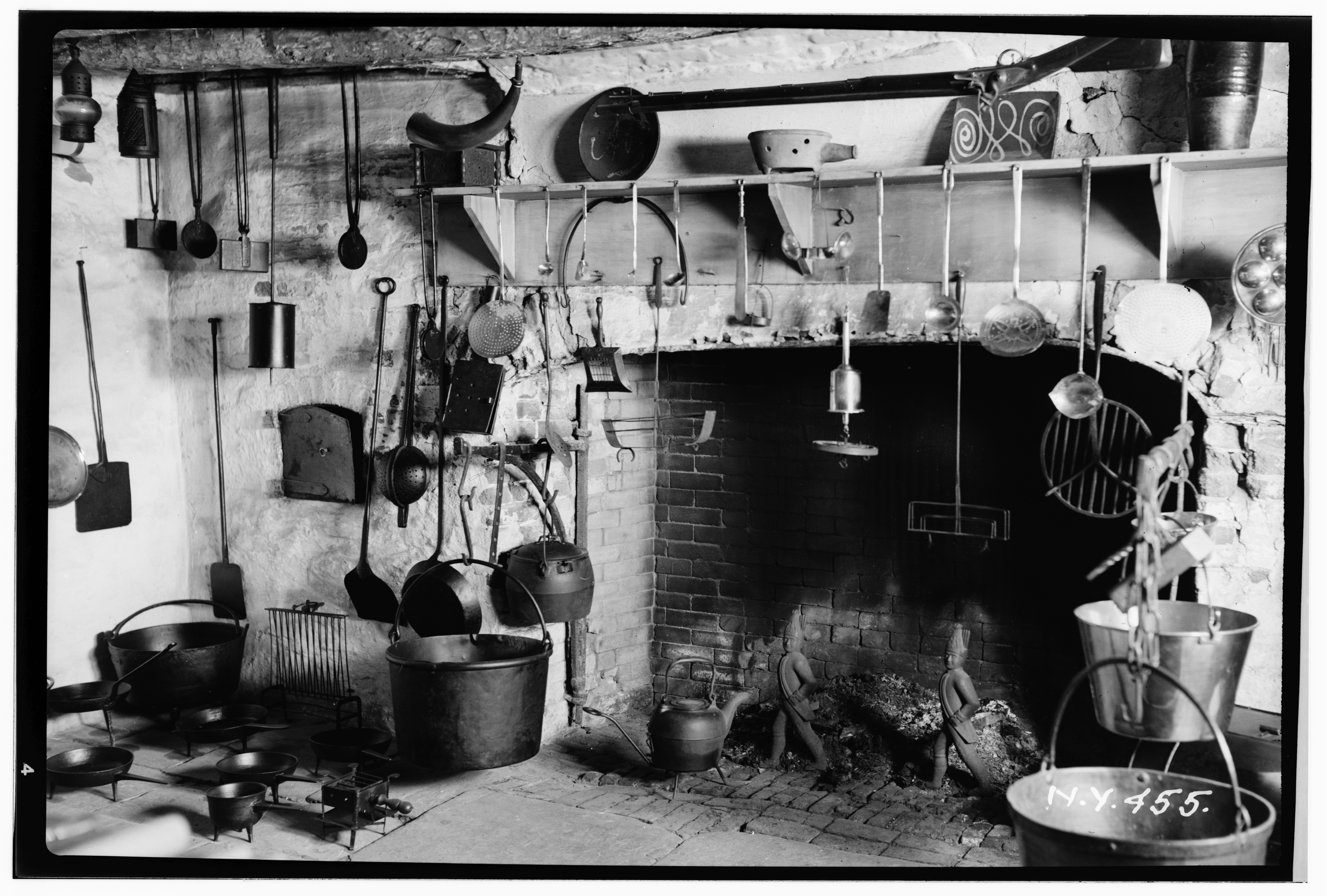
Interior of the kitchen

The kitchen is within the raised basement. The walls of the basement are 3 feet (0.91 m) thick, a defensive measure, and are made of plaster on stone. There are two small windows near the top of the western wall, which may have been intended as defensive loopholes. The basement's ceiling has low wooden beams, which measure 11 by 13 inches (280 by 330 mm) and were hand-crafted out of cypress and cedar. Water for the kitchen was originally sourced from Vault Hill. There is a Dutch brick oven embedded in the kitchen's wall. On one wall is a wide, short fireplace with a hearth and an arched opening. A dresser and a porcelain closet occupied the kitchen. There is also a newer basement with a classroom and an auditorium. The museum's restrooms are also in the basement.

==== First story ====
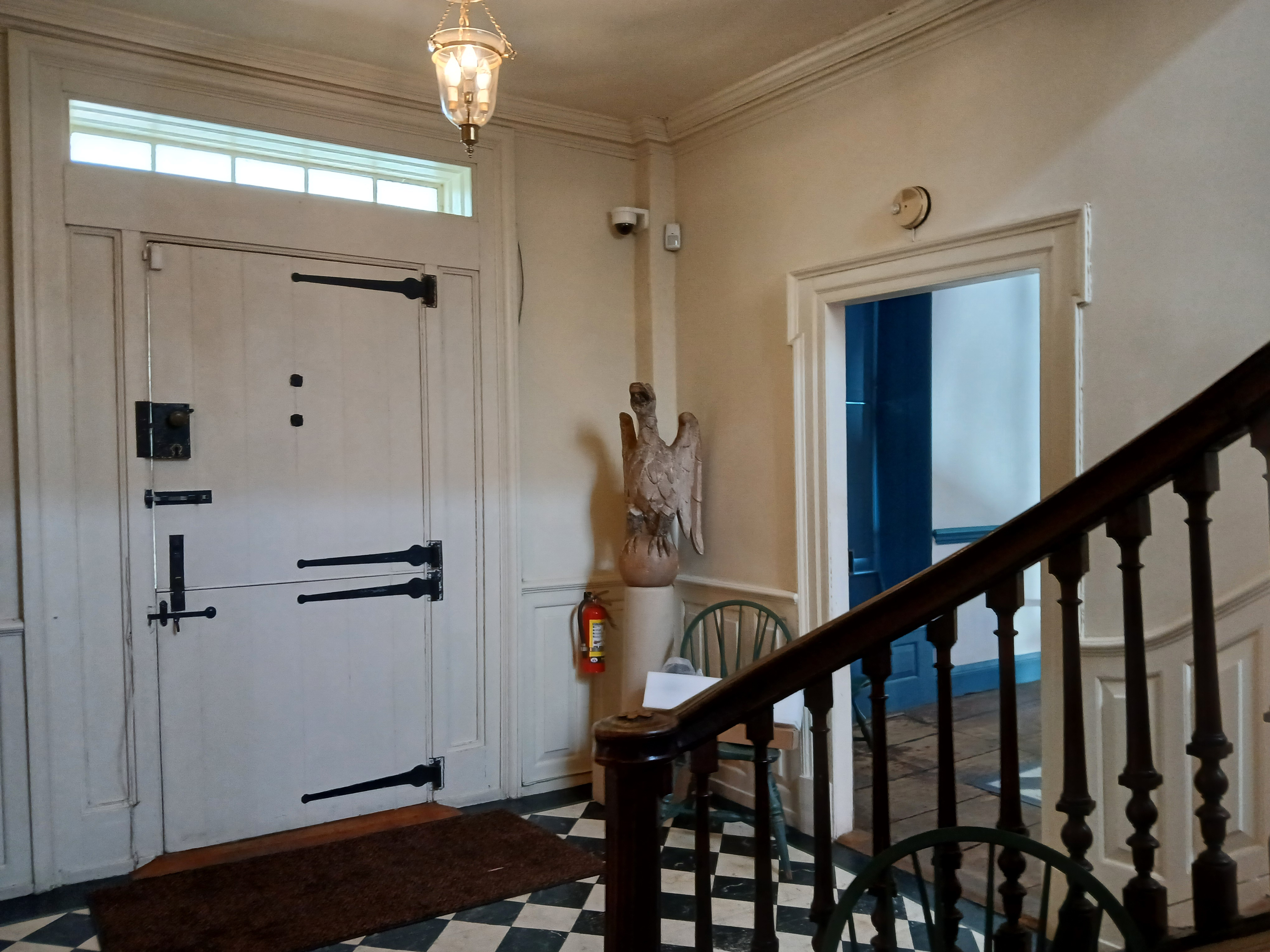
The front hall at the south end of the house

The front hall is accessed from the main entrance on the south end of the building. Doorways with eared frames lead to parlors on the west and east walls. The front hall's floor is made of yellow pine boards covered by a canvas-painted cloth. The western wall of the front hall contains a U-shaped stairway, which ascends to the second and third stories. The inner portion of the stairway has a railing with turned balusters, a round newel at the bottom, and square newels on each landing. The stairway's outer wall has paneled wainscoting. At the stairway's first landing, there is a niche containing a large window. The stairway's high ceiling was intended as a symbol of wealth when the house was built. Behind the front hall is the rear hall, which has a simple stairway and leads both to the dining room and to a servants' entrance. The rear hall was added shortly after Frederick Van Cortlandt died, when the house was being finished, and provided a private entrance for Frederick's widow Frances.

To the left (west) of the front hall is the western parlor, which served as Washington's quarters in 1783. On the northern wall is a fireplace surrounded by blue-and-white tiles, which depict scenes from the Bible. Pilasters separate the fireplace from an arched cupboard on either side; each cupboard has two paneled doors and a set of shelves for storing porcelain. The rest of the north wall is painted blue and is paneled, while the three other walls are made of white plaster with a baseboard, a dado rail, and a molding at the ceiling. The south wall has three windows. There was a group of seats next to the window on the south wall.

To the right (east) of the front hall is the eastern parlor, which was intended as a formal room. It was likely used for tea and card games. Each wall is covered in paneling with a cornice at the top. This room has a fireplace, which was probably added after the house was finished. The fireplace has a marble hearth with a wood molding, as well as a carved marble mantel with eared moldings, a shelf, and a carved frieze underneath. Above the fireplace is an overmantel with a frieze, eared moldings, and a broken pediment with an urn; the overmantel depicts Adam and Eve, a serpent, and the tree of the knowledge of good and evil.

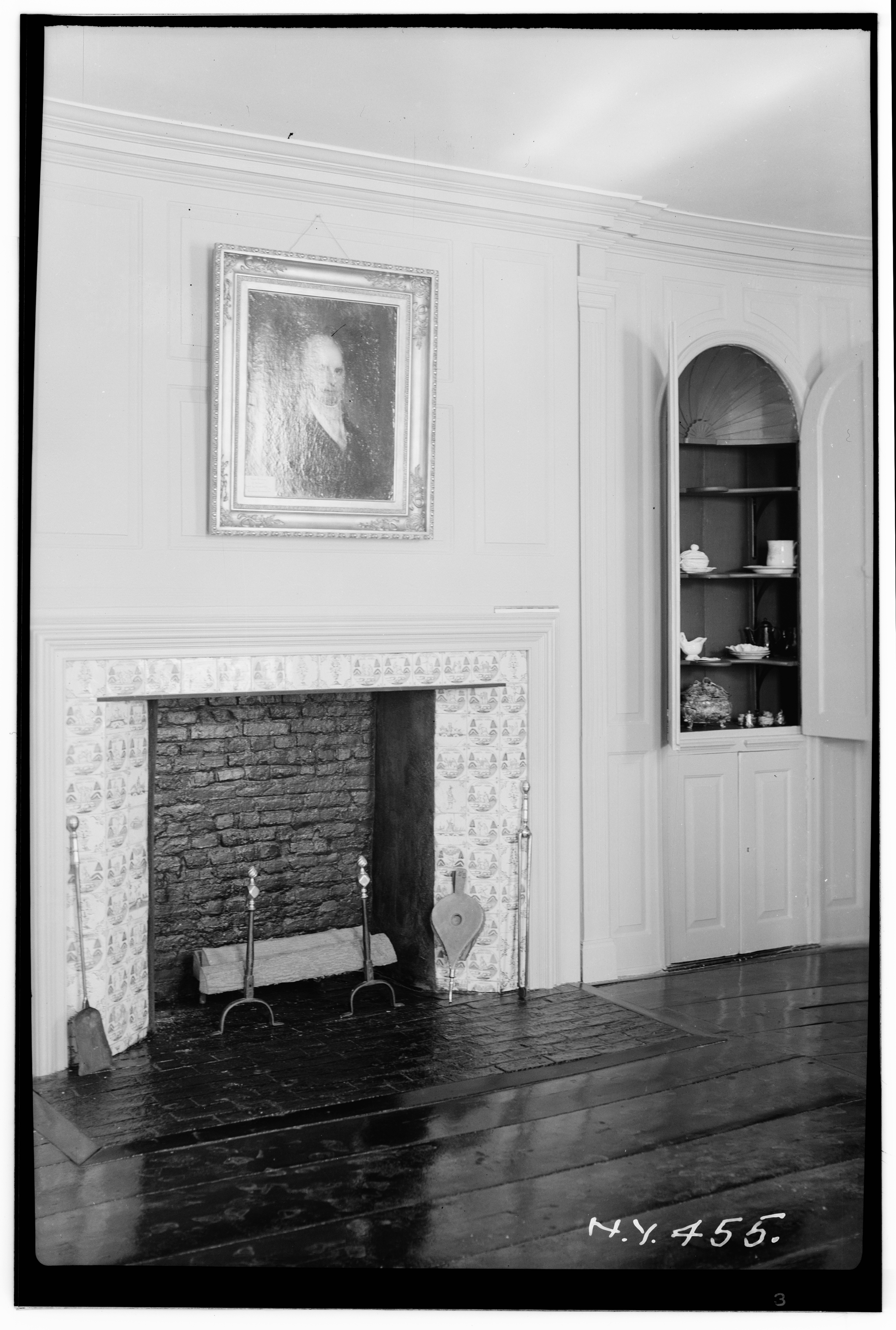
Dining room fireplace

The dining room is in the eastern wing, separated from the eastern parlor by the rear hall, and is designed in a late-18th-century style. It was likely not originally used for meals, as Americans generally did not have dedicated dining rooms prior to the American Revolution. The dining room had a fireplace with a mantel from c. 1800, which had ornamentation such as pilasters, sunbursts, and motifs of one-quarter of a fan. There was a small closet built into the side of the fireplace mantel, which was used to keep items warm during winters. One corner of the room also featured a large white cupboard which was used to store porcelain. The walls are made of light plaster above dark buff wainscoting, and a chimney occupies the north wall. Atop the wall was a ceiling molding, which likely dated from the 19th century. An 18th-century ceiling molding and fireplace mantel were restored in a subsequent renovation.

==== Upper stories ====
On the second floor, there is a hallway in the center of the southern wing, which connects with the house's main stairway. At the south end of the hallway is a sash window with inward-facing shutters and a seating area.

Next to the hallway are two rooms, one each to the west and east. These bedrooms both contain white walls; doorways with molded frames; fireplaces with paneling and white tiles; windows with internal shutters; cornices above the windows. The western room was known as the Washington bedroom and had furniture used by Washington. The north wall of the Washington bedroom has a fireplace flanked by closets, similar to the cupboards on the first-floor western parlor. Behind the eastern bedroom was a spinning room. A third bedroom to the northeast has a fireplace with allegorical Dutch tiles. One of the bedrooms was named the Monroe room because one of the family's maids had married a man surnamed Monroe.

A narrow U-shaped stairway in the second-floor hall continues up to the third floor. On the third floor were two smaller rooms for servants, one of which was in an incomplete condition. The attic has been adapted into an exhibit on the lives of the slaves who worked on the Van Cortlandt plantation.

== Operations ==
The New York City Department of Parks and Recreation owns the Van Cortlandt House. The National Society of Colonial Dames in the State of New York, a branch of the National Society of the Colonial Dames of America, continues to operate the mansion as a museum as of 2023.

=== Collections ===
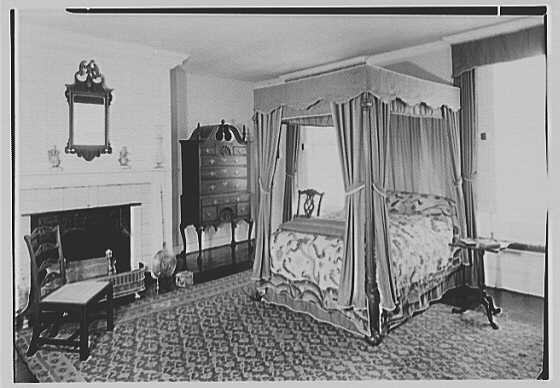
One of the bedrooms

When the house opened as a museum, the western parlor was set aside specifically as a museum, while the other rooms displayed memorabilia from Colonial Dames and their friends. In the house's early years, one room contained artifacts from the colonial and Revolutionary War eras. Old-fashioned cookware was exhibited in the kitchen. The western parlor had a pair of Benjamin Franklin's andirons and some maps dating as far back as 1642. In the eastern parlor were furniture such as chairs, a writing desk, a candle stand, and four chalk artworks. The dining room displayed porcelain, platters, and a dinner table. The western bedroom on the second story featured furniture from Washington's time at the house, such as his bed, a mahogany footrest, a carved clock, and bed steps. The eastern bedroom had a chest, printing press, and cradle, while the spinning room featured several tools used for needlework. Other objects displayed throughout the house included a set of wooden vultures that once belonged to a Spanish privateer, and two cannons outside the entrance.

In the 20th century, several objects were added to the collection, such as handmade liquor bottles that had been excavated in 1902. During the 1910s and 1920s, the house had several pieces of colonial and Dutch furniture, and one parlor was cited as having a Chippendale mirror and a secretarial desk. The upstairs rooms retained their old four-poster beds with tapestries. The house displayed objects of various sizes, in addition to china and furniture. On the third floor, there was a nursery with children's objects such as a bed and tea dishes.

By the 1970s, the western parlor featured a snuff box from Peter Stuyvesant, pistols from Aaron Burr, and an Armenian rug. The eastern parlor had a cello, spinet, and piecrust table; the dining room had plates, set for a meal; and the kitchen had various utensils, as well as objects like a powder horn and a rifle. The house also had a Dutch storage chest in one parlor, several poster beds on the second floor, and a dollhouse on the third floor. The mansion retained much of its old furniture in the 21st century, such as cupboards, cradles, and built-in cabinets. The museum also displayed artifacts such as colored rugs, bedspreads, and utensils. In the modern-day dining room, there is a set of drawers, six chairs, and a table.

=== Events ===
After the museum opened, it began hosting monthly "antiquarian exhibits" in 1903. The museum's other early exhibits included displays of antique pewter, miniatures of Colonial portraits, and needlework portraits. The museum hosted exhibits of colonial documents, paintings, and books in the 1920s, and it showed glass, silverware, china, and pottery from the 17th and 18th centuries during the 1950s. The Colonial Dames has hosted live performances on the museum's behalf; for example, it staged a play at the Alvin Theatre in 1960 to raise money for the house. By the 1970s, the house presented St. Nicholas Day performances, the Bronx Arts Ensemble's weekend concerts, Bronx Bicentennial activities, and demonstrations of Revolutionary-era military activities. In the late 20th century, the house continued to present events such as concerts, St. Nicholas Day carols, children's programs, and historical lectures.

In the 21st century, the museum hosted events such as historical reenactments. The museum gives tours throughout the year, including both self-guided tours and those led by docents. The house also hosts special events.

== Impact and legacy ==
=== Reception ===
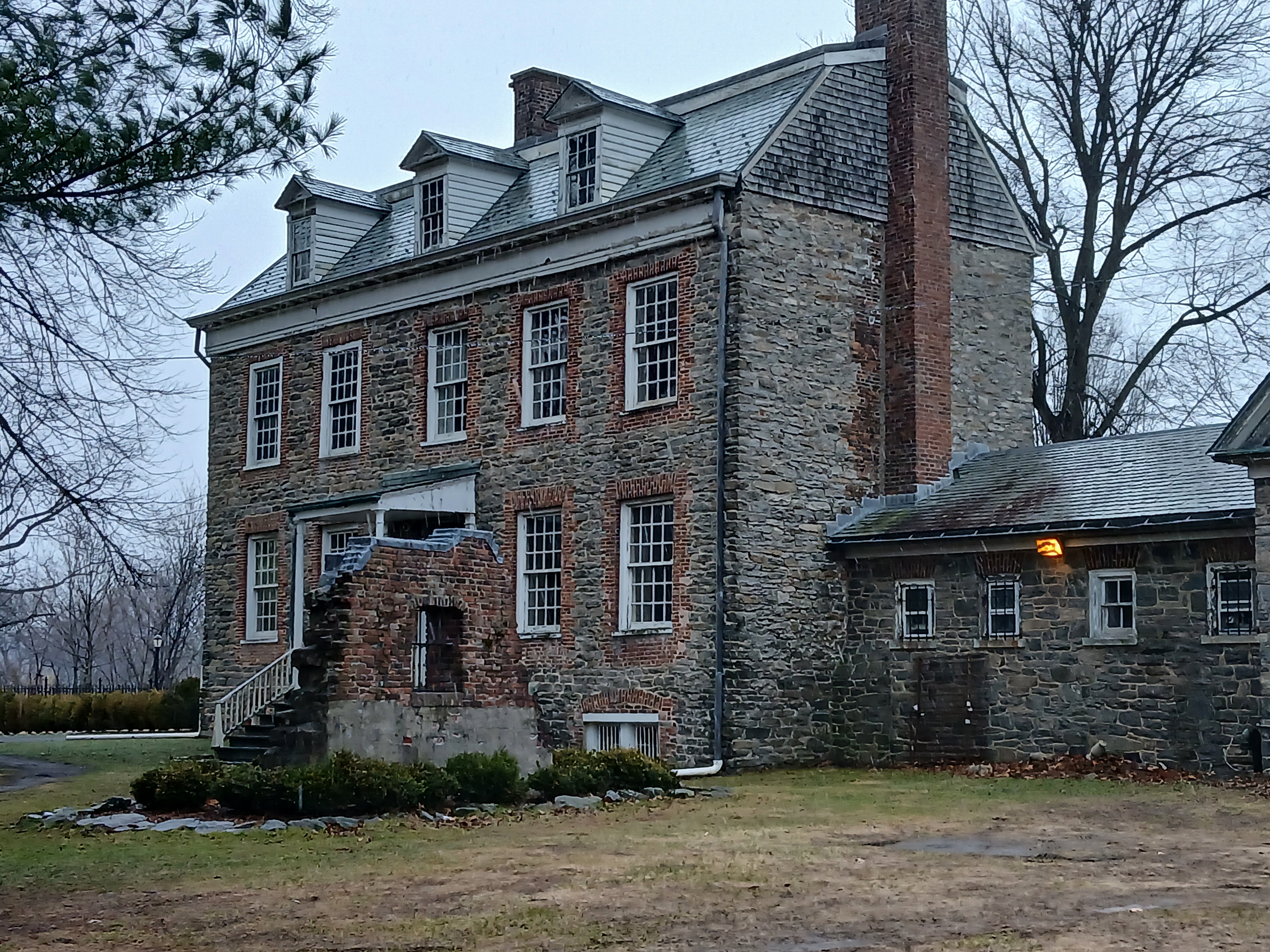
View from the northeast

In 1889, one reporter described the building as "solid, substantial, massive", having been preserved "in splendid condition". After the house was converted into a museum, The New York Times wrote that the house was "one of the most interesting relics of the Colonial period", while the Brooklyn Daily Eagle said: "The house alone, on account of its shapely architecture and quaint furnishings, is worth a visit to [Van Cortlandt] park". A writer for Town and Country said in 1901 that the house preserved "all the glory of that interesting era dear to those who love to read the history of New York before it was so cosmopolitan", while another Times article in 1911 said that the house by itself was a reason to visit Van Cortlandt Park. A writer for The Christian Science Monitor wrote in 1915 that "this house helps us to picture their days of generous means and dignified living". Conversely, a writer for The American Architect said in 1919 that the house displayed too many objects that "are not relevant to the house or its history and are misleading in suggestion".

One critic, writing in 1927, said the Van Cortlandt House, along with the Gracie Mansion and the Morris–Jumel Mansion, were among the few old houses in New York City that "retain some of their former dignity and beauty of surroundings". Another writer in 1964 described the house as having "interior paneling and furnishings of the first rank", while a reporter for the Philadelphia Inquirer said in 1984 that it was the Bronx's "most prestigious house". Bronx historian Lloyd Ultan characterized the house in 1995 as being "highly significant to the history of the nation" due to its use during the American Revolutionary War. Times critic Mimi Sheraton wrote in 2001 that the house's "almost rustic Georgian simplicity" contrasted with the grandeur of the Bartow–Pell Mansion.

=== Media and landmark designations ===
The house has been shown in various media works. The Van Cortlandt House's historical importance had been recognized as early as 1914, when the New York City Art Commission took pictures of the mansion and other notable sites across the city; at the time, cameras were still relatively uncommon. The Van Cortlandt House was also depicted in a mural painted in the Bronx County Courthouse in 1934. In addition, a depiction of the house was displayed at the City Gallery at 2 Columbus Circle in 1981, and the mansion stood in for an Irish house on an episode of the TV series Boardwalk Empire.

The New York City Landmarks Preservation Commission (LPC) designated the Van Cortlandt House as a city landmark in March 1966, and the Board of Estimate ratified the landmark designation that August. This made the mansion one of the first residences in the Bronx to be designated as a city landmark. The mansion was added to the National Register of Historic Places in 1967 and became a National Historic Landmark in 1976. The LPC designated the interiors of the Van Cortlandt Mansion as a city landmark in July 1975; the designation covered several Georgian-style rooms.

== See also ==
- List of museums and cultural institutions in New York City
- List of New York City Designated Landmarks in the Bronx
- National Historic Landmarks in New York City
- National Register of Historic Places listings in the Bronx
