= Tibbetts Brook (Minnesota) =

Stream in Mille Lacs County, Minnesota, U.S.

Coordinates: 45°51′04″N 93°41′09″W

Tibbetts Brook is a stream in Mille Lacs County, in the U.S. state of Minnesota.

Tibbetts Brook was named for two brothers who worked in the lumber industry.

== See also ==
- List of rivers of Minnesota
