= Tibbetts Brook Park =

Park in Yonkers, New York, U.S.

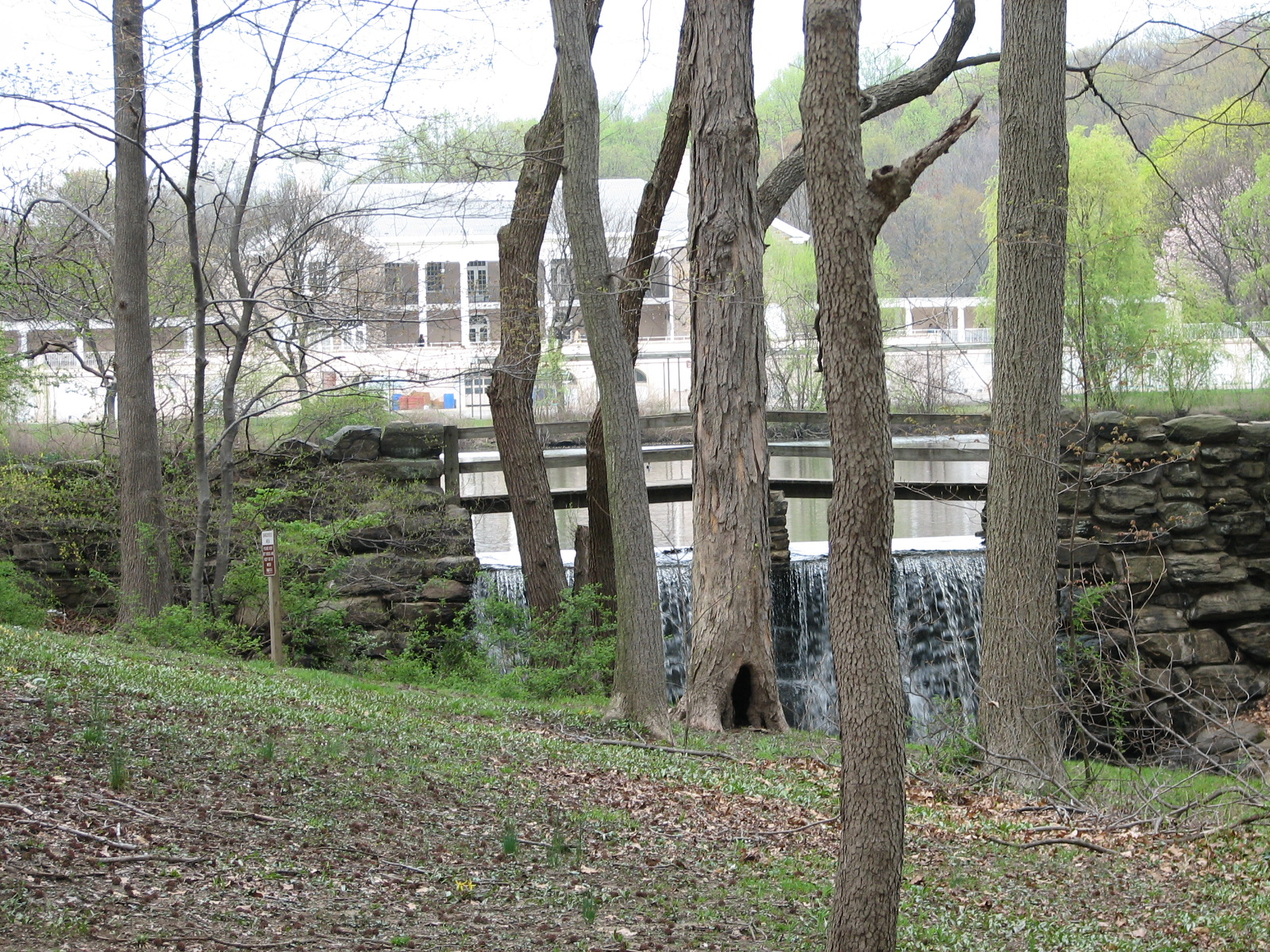
- Tibbetts Brook Park, waterfall on the brook and facing administration building.
- Interactive map of Tibbetts Brook Park
- Type: Municipal
- Location: Yonkers, NY, United States
- Coordinates: 40°55′33″N 73°52′40″W
- Area: 161 acres (65 ha)
- Created: 1927
- Operator: Westchester County Department of Parks, Recreation and Conservation
- Status: Open

Tibbetts Brook Park is a 161-acre (65 ha) park located in the Lincoln Park section of Yonkers in Westchester County, New York. Opened in 1927, it was one of the first developed parks in Westchester County and is accessible only to County residents, with activities that include swimming, hiking, sports, nature watching and fishing.

The park is named for Tibbetts Brook, which in turn is named for George Tibbetts, a Briton who had settled the land in 1668. The park is bordered by the Cross County Parkway to the north, Saw Mill River Parkway to the west, McLean Avenue to the south and Midland Avenue to the East. Tibbetts Brook Park is .6 miles (1 km) north of Van Cortlandt Park along South County Trailway, and Tibbetts Brook crosses north-south through the park on its way to the Harlem River.

The park is the home ground of the New York Magpies in the USAFL.

== History ==
In 1668, Georger Tippett purchased the land from Elias Doughty who had owned a large estate that encompassed much of the land from the Hudson River through the Bronx River and Saw Mill River. George's descendants were removed from the land after the American Revolution for their loyalty to the Crown. Their land was subsequently confiscated and sold. The park was partially the site of the Battle of Tibbett's Brook or Battle of Kingsbridge in 1778. Sachem (Chief) Daniel Nimham, a Native American chief, and Ethan Allen joined with other Americans and fought the Queen's Rangers commanded by John Graves Simcoe. Ninham led the Stockbridge Militia, consisting of members of the Mahican and Wappinger tribes. The battle lasted from August 30 to 31. The British were victorious, while Ninham and other members of the militia died during the battle. They were buried in an area now known as Indian Field in nearby Van Cortlandt Park. Four British soldiers were killed and three were wounded including Simcoe.

Part of the Old Croton Aqueduct runs through Tibbetts Brook Park. The aqueduct was built between 1837 and 1842 in order to supply fresh clean water for New York City which was suffering water-borne disease outbreaks. In 1890, the Old Croton Aqueduct was decommissioned to make way for the new, improved and higher capacity New Croton Aqueduct.

In 1872, the site of Tibbetts Brook Park was purchased by Leonard W. Jerome, which became part of "Valley Farms". By the 20th Century, a garbage dump was located on the north side of Yonkers Avenue near the site, with a lake created by the overflow of Tibbetts Brook. This lake, called Peckham's Lake, was used as a swimming hole in spite of high levels of pollution and disease, due to the brook water passing through the garbage dump. The area immediately south had been a swamp which was a haven for mosquitoes. The entire site was referred to as "The Jungle". In 1923, the Westchester County Park Commission proposed constructing a park on the site, purchasing the land from Valley Farms in October of that year. Construction on the park began in September 1924, which included removing "fourteen feet of garbage" from the site. The park opened on June 25, 1927.

Upon opening, the park was rather undeveloped, containing a boat dock. The park's pool was soon built and commissioned because children still swam in Tibbetts Brook. In 1931, the Saw Mill River Parkway from Yonkers to Elmsford was completed and in 1940, a pedestrian bridge over the Saw Mill River Parkway and the railroad was finished, allowing people from a western, yet undeveloped portion of the park to walk in. In June, 2007, Tibbetts Brook Park North, a complex of three sports fields were opened.

== Attractions ==
Tibbetts was known for its 412 x 125-foot (38 m) pool which in June 2011 reopened as a state of the art saline water park featuring a river, various sprays and waterfalls, waterslides, and a small lap pool enclosed amidst the rest of the water park. The numerous walking/hiking trails include part of the 14-mile (23 km) South County Trailway which runs near the western side of the park, and part of the Croton Aqueduct Trail. Tibbets also has a miniature golf course, ice skating/skiing (winter), two artificial lakes for fishing, playgrounds and camp sites along with tennis, soccer, football, and baseball facilities.

The park is open 7-days a week from 8 am until dusk.

== Wildlife ==
Many species of birds and mammals have been reported at the park Tibbetts Brook Park

=== List of species ===
Species	Highest Count
Waterfowl
Canada Goose	875
Mute Swan	3
Wood Duck	31
Northern Shoveler	10
Gadwall	3
Mallard	168
Domestic Mallards	20
American Black Duck	20
Ruddy Duck	4
Pigeon/Doves
Rock Pigeon	43
Mourning Dove	80
