= Tibbetts Brook =

Stream in downstate New York

Coordinates: 40.908099°N 73.885569°W

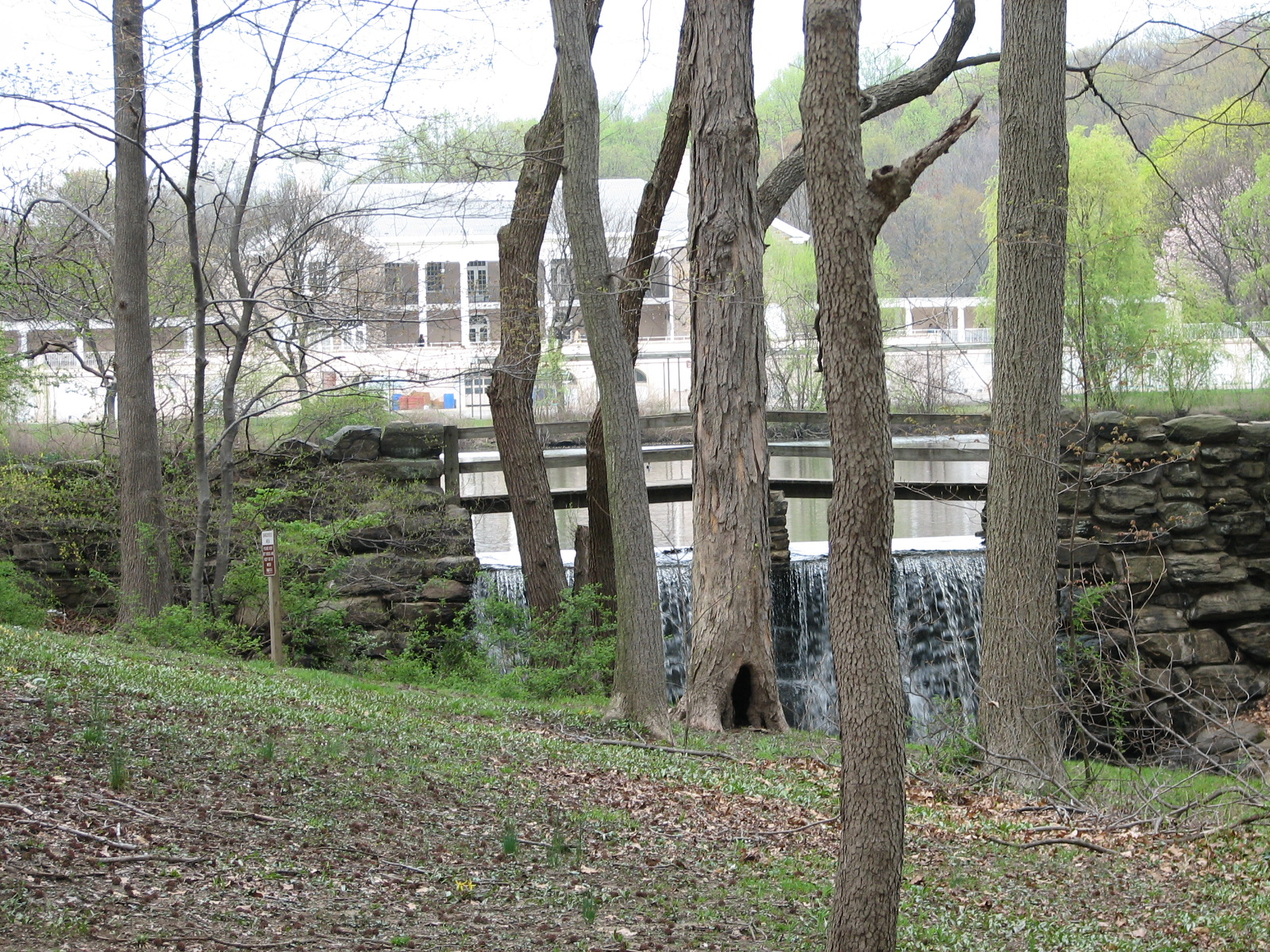
A waterfall in Tibbetts Brook Park

Tibbetts Brook, originally Tippett's Brook or Tibbitt's Brook, is a stream in the southern portion of mainland New York, flowing north to south from the city of Yonkers in Westchester County into the borough of the Bronx within New York City. Originally emptying into Spuyten Duyvil Creek as part of the Harlem River system, the stream is now partially subterranean, ending above ground at the south end of Van Cortlandt Lake within Van Cortlandt Park. There it proceeds into city sewers, draining into either the northern end of the Harlem River or the Wards Island Water Pollution Control Plant. The brook provides significant watershed to both Van Cortlandt Park at its south end and Tibbetts Brook Park at its north end. There have been modern proposals to daylight the southern portion of the brook back onto the surface.

== Course ==
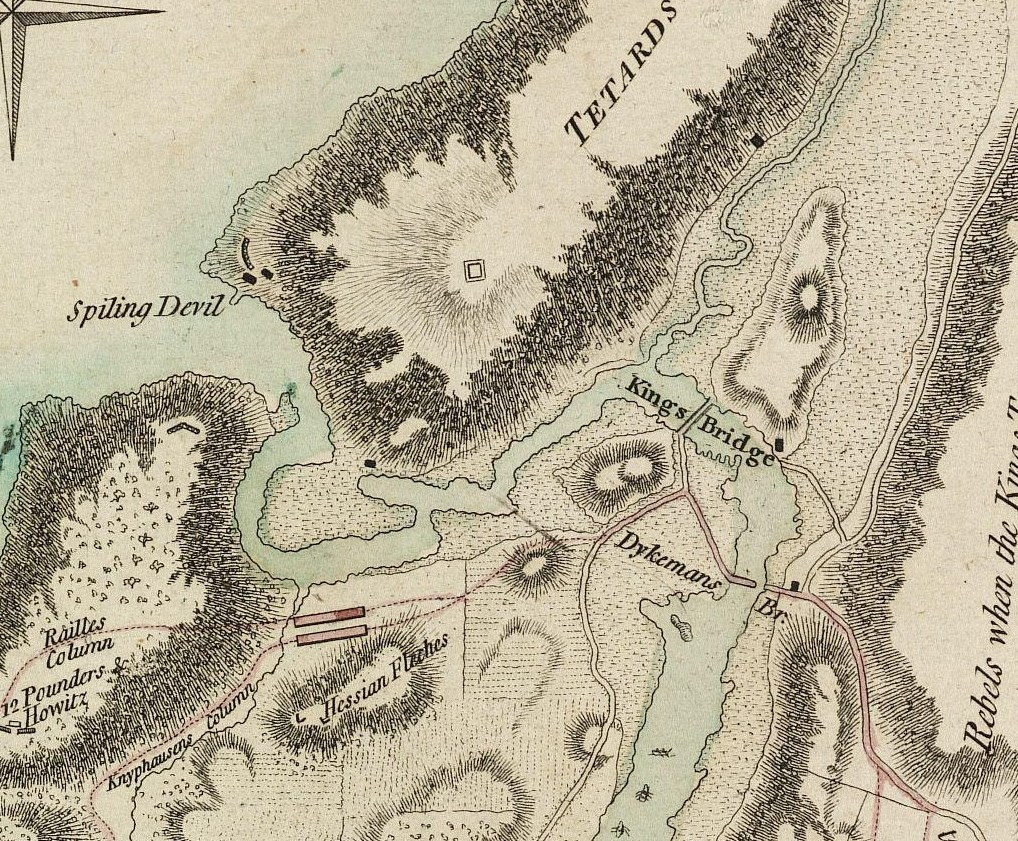
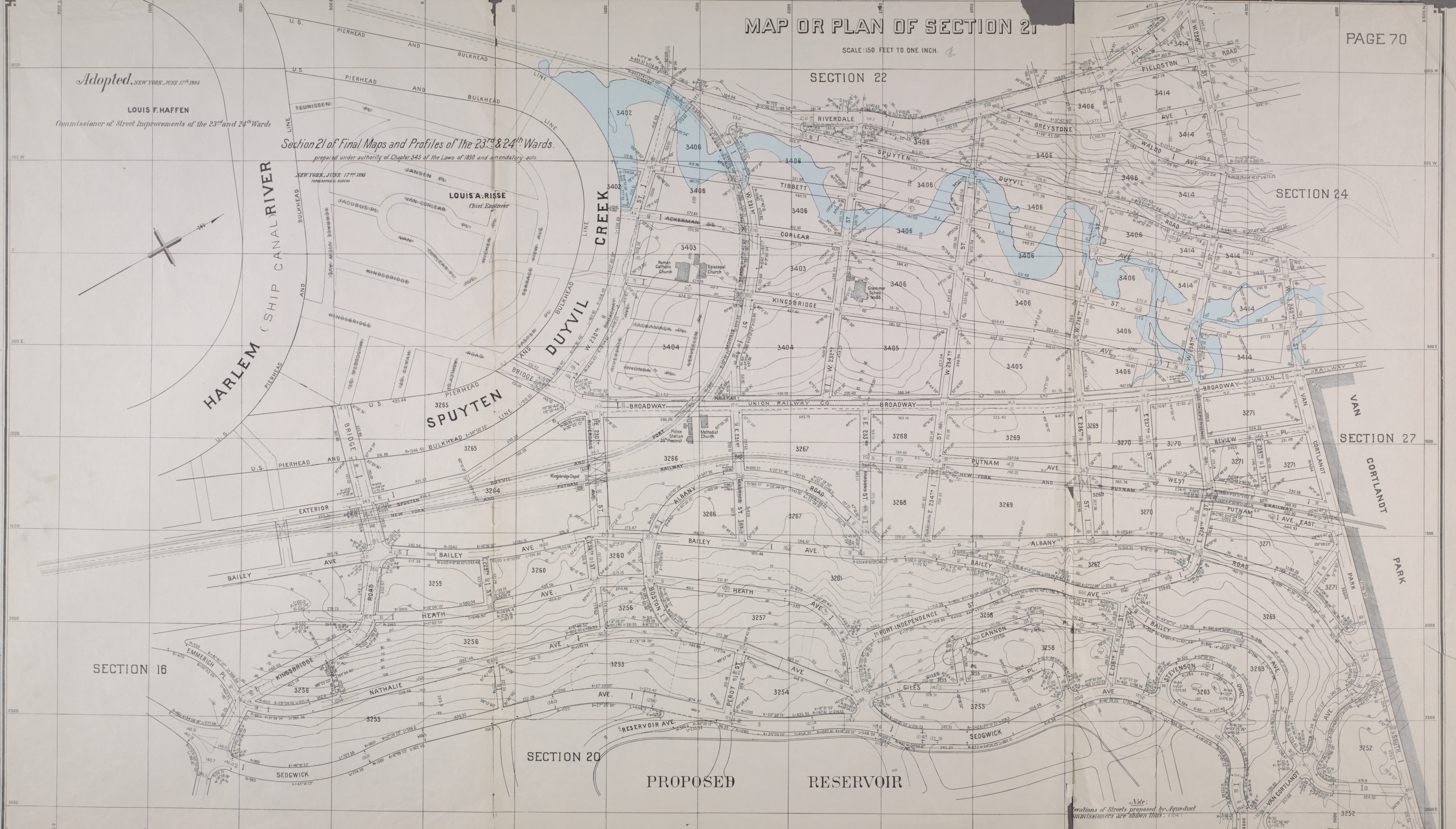
Top: The original course of Spuyten Duyvil Creek and its junction with Tibbetts Brook, and the island of Paparinemo (now Kingsbridge, Bronx)
Bottom: Two sections of an 1895 map of The Bronx, showing the course of Tibbetts Brook through the park lake and to Spuyten Duyvil Creek.

Tibbetts Brook originates at H.F. Redmond Junior Memorial Park just north of Yonkers Avenue in Dunwoodie, Yonkers. It proceeds south through two artificial lakes in Tibbetts Brook Park, on a course parallel and adjacent to the Saw Mill River Parkway and the former New York and Putnam Railroad (now a park trail). South of the park the brook runs in a channel directly adjacent to the northbound side of the parkway, then crosses the Yonkers/Bronx border into Van Cortlandt Park. It runs through the center of the Van Cortlandt Golf Course, then empties into Van Cortlandt Lake, an artificial lake created in 1699 by damming the stream. The brook currently ends at the south edge of the lake, at approximately West 242nd Street. Several storm drains feed excess rainwater into the brook within Yonkers.

At the brook's mouth, the water from the brook proceeds into a brick sewer tunnel, which later merges with the major combined sewer underneath Broadway that carries rainwater, household wastewater, and industrial sewage. The tunnel primarily drains into the Wards Island Water Pollution Control Plant where city sewage is treated. During rainy conditions the sewer overflows into the north end of the Harlem River, via a drain pipe at about West 192nd Street (Heath Avenue). Due to modern development, the brook runs through underpasses and culverts at various points along its course.

As recently as the early 20th Century, Tibbets Brook had two northern tributaries which merged at the north end of modern Tibbets Brook Park. The easternmost began in Redmond Park, while the western stream extended as far as Runyon Heights. The two streams originally merged at Peckham's Lake, later converging at the lakes of Tibbets Brook Park following the completion of the park. The Saw Mill Parkway was built over the western stream in the late 1920s. Until the end of the 19th century, the brook extended past the south end of Van Cortlandt Park. It ran southwest through the site of the current Van Cortlandt Stadium, crossed Broadway at around West 240th Street, then continued southwest through the Kingsbridge neighborhood, running a twisty course along the right-of-way of modern Tibbett Avenue. At approximately West 230th Street, just north of the current site of John F. Kennedy High School, the brook drained into Spuyten Duyvil Creek, which at the time separated the Bronx from Marble Hill, Manhattan.

Until the 1700s, Tibbets Brook split into two smaller streams at around West 237th Street, the westernmost and primary stream along modern Tibbett Avenue feeding into the Spuyten Duyvil, and the easternmost along the right-of-ways of the Putnam Railroad and current Major Deegan Expressway feeding into the Harlem River. The two streams formed a triangular island called Paparinemo that constitutes much of today's Kingsbridge neighborhood. The brook had numerous tributaries, including several within modern Van Cortlandt Park. The north end of the brook within Yonkers and the park is entirely fresh water, while south of the park it was a tidal estuary lined with salt marshes. The watershed from the brook created wetlands surrounding the stream, and formed a northern extension of the Harlem River valley. The original Spuyten Duyvil Creek course has since been filled in, replaced by the Harlem River Ship Canal.

== Etymology ==
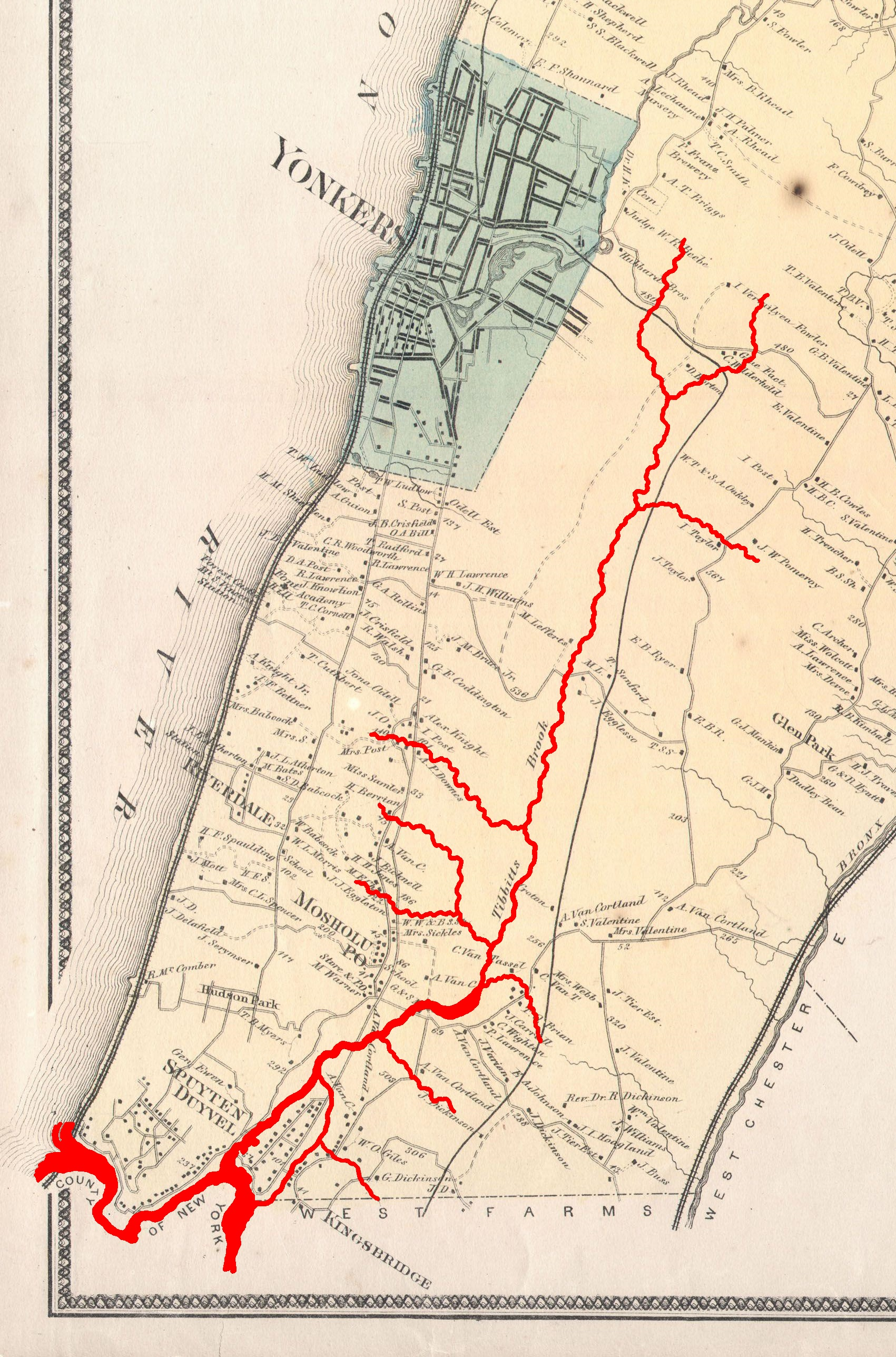
An 1867 map of Yonkers and Western Bronx, showing the course of Tibbetts Brook (in red) prior to modern development.

Tibbetts Brook was originally referred to as Mosholu by local Lenape Native Americans, an Algonquin word meaning "smooth stones" or "small stones". The Mosholu name was later given to Mosholu Parkway. The label Tibbetts Brook was applied by European settlers, named after George Tippett who held property between the Hudson River and Bronx River in the late 17th Century, with the brook running through the center. Although often considered a corruption of the name Tippett, the label may be a combination of the name of Tippett and that of his father-in-law William Betts, who owned the land along with him. The brook has also been referred to as the Yonkers River or Yonkers Creek in the past, previously written as Jonckers or Uncas.

== History ==
=== Geological formation and precolonial use ===
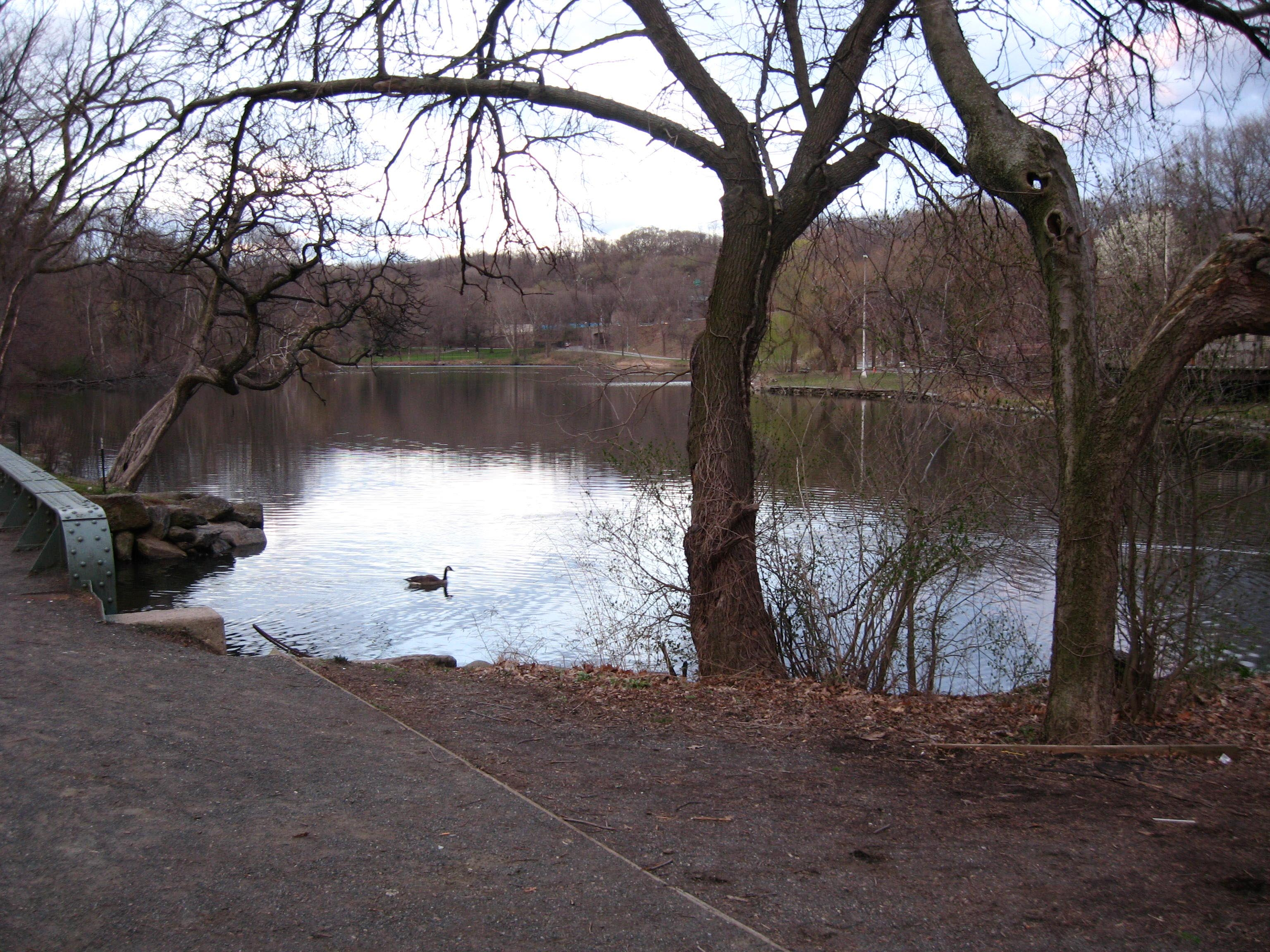
The lake within Van Cortlandt Park, at the south end of the brook

During at least three glacial periods, including the Wisconsin glaciation around 20,000 years ago, ice sheets advanced south across North America carving moraines, valleys, and hills across present-day Bronx and Westchester. As the glacial ice melted, rivers and creeks were formed within valleys, including Tibbetts Brook.

Prior to European colonization, the local Lenape population utilized the brook for drinking water and fishing. Trout swam up the Harlem River in order to use the freshwater portion of the brook as a spawning site. The salt marshes along the stream housed fish and migratory birds, along with mussels, oysters, and crabs.

=== Human development ===
In the 1690s, Jacobus Van Cortlandt acquired property near Tibbetts Brook from his relative Frederick Philipse, located in modern Van Cortlandt Park. This area was called "George's Point", where the brook turned west towards Broadway. In 1699, Van Cortlandt dammed the stream in order to power a gristmill and sawmill, creating Van Cortlandt Lake as a mill pond in the process. By the 19th Century, the eastern stream was filled in, connecting Kingsbridge to the rest of the Bronx.

From 1872 to 1880, the New York and Putnam Railroad was built along the Tibbetts Brook valley. The construction of the railroad altered the natural drainage pattern of the brook, leading new marshes to develop around it. In 1888, the New York City Parks Department acquired the land to create Van Cortlandt Park. The Parks Department began draining the brook wetlands for recreational areas, creating the park's parade ground in 1888 and the Van Cortlandt Golf Course in 1895.

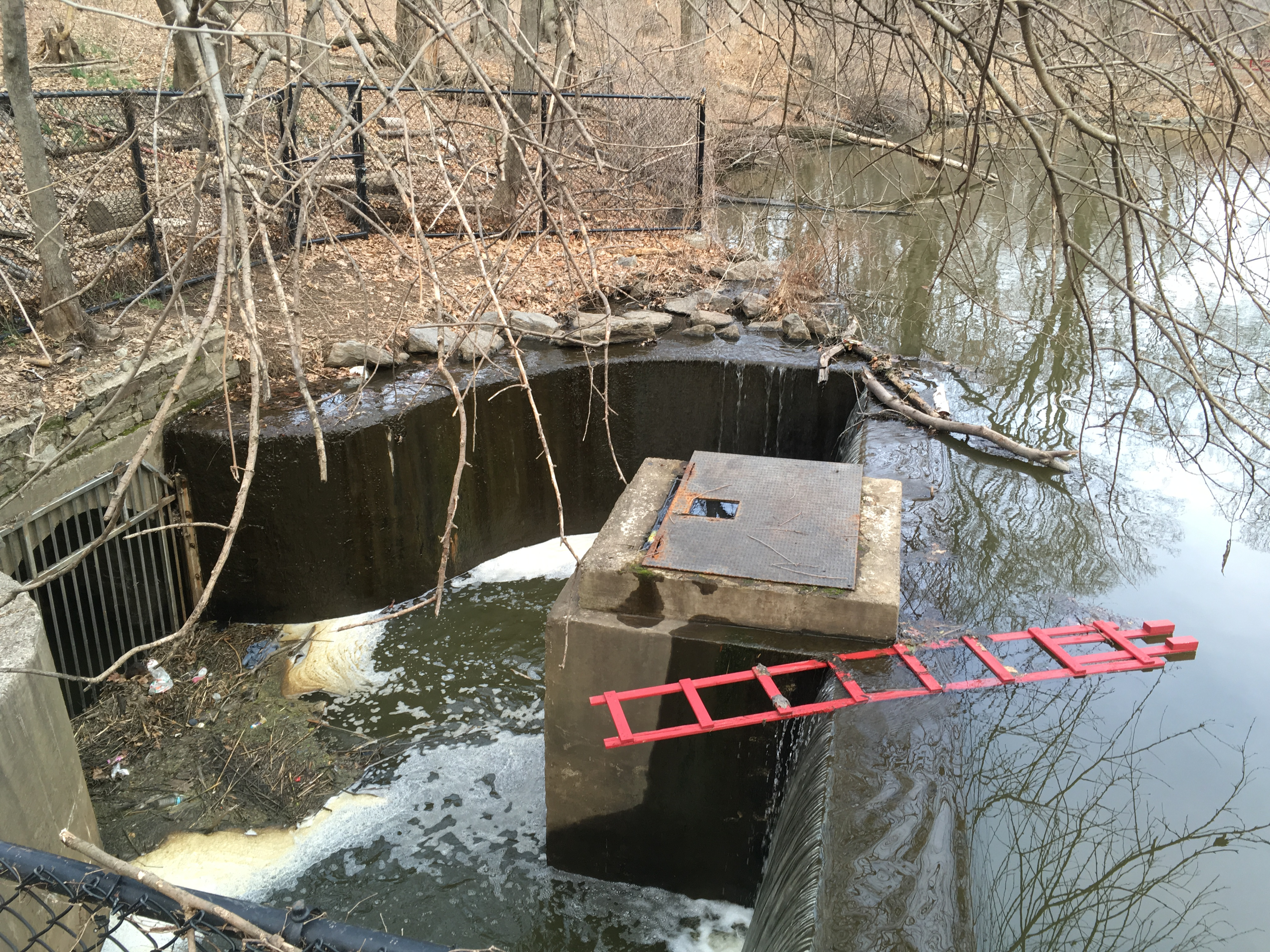
The lake flows south into a drain pipe to the Broadway sewer

Between the late 1890s and the early 1910s, around the time the original course of Spuyten Duyvil Creek was filled in and replaced by the Harlem River Ship Canal, the double-arched Broadway sewer was constructed, as was the tunnel at the south end of Van Cortlandt Lake to funnel water from the brook into the sewer. The marshlands created by the brook and lake had drawn the ire of local residents and property owners, who believed them to be "unsightly and unsanitary". Of particular concern was the threat of the wetlands serving as breeding grounds for malaria-borne mosquitoes. The Broadway Outlet Sewer was completed in 1907. In conjunction with the sewer project, from 1903 to 1911 the Parks Department completed a cleaning and improvement project for the Van Cortlandt Lake. This involved removing the original earthen dam and emptying the lake in order to dredge the lake bed to a lower depth. A new dam was installed to reform the lake. The drain pipe between the lake and Broadway sewer was constructed from 1911 to 1912. It was originally envisioned as cast-iron, but built using brick. Around this time, Tibbett Avenue was laid out and opened, while much of the marshland within the park and along the former river course was filled in.

On June 25, 1927, Westchester County opened Tibbetts Brook Park near the northern end of the brook, on land previously confiscated from the Tippett estate. Much of the site had been a Yonkers city garbage dump located on the banks of the western brook tributary. The garbage and residential sewage seeped into the stream, which fed polluted water into Peckham's Lake. The lake had been used by residents as a swimming hole in spite of recommendations against it by health officials. The area immediately south of the lake had been a swamp which was a haven for mosquitoes. As part of the creation of the park, the original lake was filled in, while the swamp was dredged to form the current Tibbetts Lake. The brook, meanwhile, was diverted into a paved channel. The eastern tributary had been protected by fences and infrastructure from the nearby Old Croton Aqueduct. At the time the park was constructed, the southern portion of the Saw Mill River Parkway was built on top of the dump along the western tributary course.

Between the 1930s and 1960s under the supervision of Robert Moses, several highways including the Henry Hudson, Saw Mill and Mosholu Parkways were constructed within Van Cortlandt Park, requiring Tibbetts Brook to be diverted into culverts under the roadways. The creation of the sewer at the south end of Van Cortlandt Lake and the construction of the highways induced siltation of the stream, leading to further creation of marshes. In addition, pollution from upstream and the highways, and spillover of chemicals used in the golf course led to the death of fish inhabiting the lake. In 1978, the fish population of the lake was restored.

In 1979, four storm sewers along Midland Avenue in Yonkers (which forms the eastern boundary of Tibbetts Brook Park) were found to be illegally connected to the brook, pumping raw sewage into it which proceeded to enter Van Cortlandt Lake downstream. That year, another storm drain located at approximately Lawton Street and McLean Avenue near the Saw Mill Parkway, 1,300 feet (400 m) north of the Yonkers/Bronx border, was found to be leaking household sewage into the brook. In 1984, sewage from Yonkers was again found to be contaminating Van Cortlandt Lake, due to the crossing of raw sewage pipes and storm sewers which feed into Tibbetts Brook. This included water from the Lawton Street drain pipe. The same sewage pipe was found to be the cause of pollution of the lake in 2016. Beginning in 2015, the Friends of Van Cortlandt Park, in collaboration with the Civil and Environmental Engineering Department at Manhattan College, monitor the Brook's water quality.

=== Daylighting ===
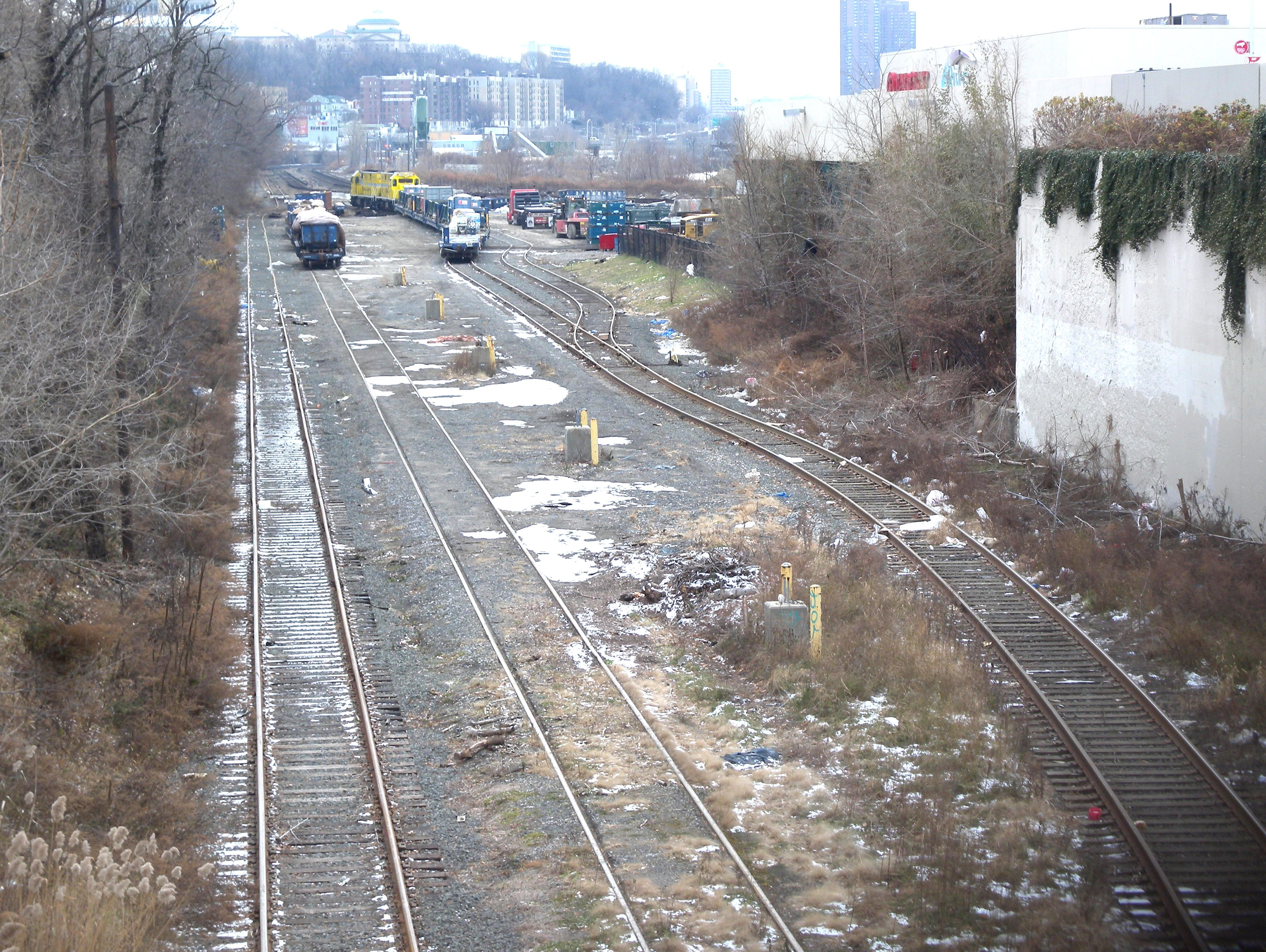
The short portion of the Putnam Railroad still in operation

Since the 1990s, community groups have proposed daylighting the southern portion of Tibbetts Brook back onto the surface, and to restore and defragment the portions of the stream within Van Cortlandt Park. Proposals to daylight the stream have existed since the 1990s. Around 4 to 5 million U.S. gallons (15,000,000 to 19,000,000 L) of fresh water from the brook enter the sewer system on a daily basis, a total of 2 billion U.S. gallons (7.6×10^{9} liters) annually. The additional water from the brook also contributes to the further overflowing of raw sewage into the Harlem River during rainy conditions. Meanwhile, the lack of natural drainage points within Van Cortlandt Park leads to the flooding of recreational areas within the park. The proposed daylighting would divert up to 220 million U.S. gallons (830,000,000 L) away from the local sewer system annually.

The New York City Department of Parks and Recreation (NYC Parks) announced plans in 2014 to daylight the brook as part of their "Van Cortlandt Park Master Plan: 2030". The plan also proposes further dredging the lake and stream within the park, and rerouting the stream away from the highways and pedestrian paths to minimize the use of culverts, as well as restoring the natural wetlands created by the brook. The primary route proposed for bringing the brook above ground is the former Putnam Railroad right-of-way, which is currently owned by CSX Transportation but is largely abandoned between the park and the Harlem River. This portion of the Putnam Railroad is directly adjacent to the southbound lanes of the Major Deegan Expressway. The routing would provide a more natural drainage path for the brook into the Harlem River, with none of the water entering the sewer system on a normal basis. The brook would flow through a new park.

After several years of delays, the New York City government agreed to buy CSX's land in January 2023 for $11.2 million. That August, the New York City Public Design Commission approved an initial design for the daylighting. The city still had to obtain some land between 225th and 230th streets from the Metropolitan Transportation Authority (MTA), which operated a garbage-transfer facility at that site. The MTA did not want to give away the land because it would substantially disrupt service on the Metro-North Railroad's Hudson Line. Despite a lack of agreement with the MTA, the New York City government decided to proceed with the daylighting by early 2024. That June, NYC Parks and the New York City Department of Environmental Protection finalized their purchase of land from CSX. At the time, the project was scheduled to cost $133 million.

== See also ==
- Saw Mill River, a parallel river also in Yonkers
