= List of museums and cultural institutions in New York City =

New York City is home to hundreds of cultural institutions and historic sites, many of which are internationally known. This list contains the most famous or well-regarded organizations, based on their mission.

== Museums ==
Also included are non-profit art galleries, arts centers and cultural centers with galleries.

- See List of museums in New York City for a complete sortable list in alphabetical order.
- See List of museums in New York for museums in the rest of New York state.

=== Encyclopedic ===
Name	Neighborhood	Borough	Type	Summary
Metropolitan Museum of Art	Museum Mile	Manhattan	Art	One of the world's largest, and most visited art museums; includes American art and decorative arts, European, African, Asian, Ancient Egyptian, Roman and Greek art, Byzantine and Islamic art, modern art
Brooklyn Museum	Crown Heights	Brooklyn	Art	Collections include American art, Egyptian, Classical, and Ancient Near Eastern art, feminist, European and art of the Pacific Islands.
Staten Island Museum	West New Brighton	Staten Island	Multiple	Natural history, art, history, science; located at Snug Harbor Cultural Center
Bronx Museum of the Arts	Concourse Village	Bronx	Art	Focuses on contemporary and 20th-century art
Queens Museum	Corona	Queens	Art	Formerly Queens Museum of Art; includes a collection of Tiffany glass

=== Region and tradition ===
==== African and African American ====
Name	Neighborhood	Borough	Type	Summary
Weeksville Heritage Center	Bedford–Stuyvesant	Brooklyn	Living	Historic homes of 19th-century free African Americans in the urban North
Jackie Robinson Museum	Soho	Manhattan	African American	Learn about the enduring legacy of Jackie Robinson through exhibitions, dialogue and education.
Museum of Contemporary African Diasporan Arts	Fort Greene	Brooklyn	Art	Art focusing on social and political issues facing the African Diaspora
Schomburg Center for Research in Black Culture	Harlem	Manhattan	African American	Branch of the New York Public Library; exhibits of African American history and culture
Studio Museum in Harlem	Harlem	Manhattan	Art	Art of African-Americans, specializing in 19th- and 20th-century work as well as exhibits of Caribbean and African art
The Africa Center	Museum Mile	Manhattan	Art	African art and culture, building new facility on Museum Mile
African Burial Ground National Monument	TriBeCa		Monument	Visitors' center and memorial to an 18th-century African-American slave burial ground
Lewis H. Latimer House	Flushing	Queens	Historic house	Home of African American inventor Lewis H. Latimer
Sandy Ground Historical Museum	South Shore	Staten Island	Local history	website
Louis Armstrong House	Corona	Queens	Historic House	Original home and furnishings of Jazz trumpeter and pop icon Louis Armstrong
Cultural Museum of African Art	Bedford–Stuyvesant	Brooklyn	Art	African art and cultural heritage

==== Asian and Asian American ====
Name	Neighborhood	Borough	Type	Summary
Asia Society	Upper East Side	Manhattan	Art	Features historic and contemporary Asian art and decorative items
Asian American Arts Centre	Lower Manhattan	Manhattan	Art	Cultural center with exhibition galleries
China Institute	Upper East Side	Manhattan	Art	Galleries with exhibits about traditional Chinese paintings, calligraphy, Chinese folk arts, textiles and architecture
Museum of Chinese in America	Chinatown	Manhattan	Ethnic – Chinese American	History of North America's Chinatowns and the cultural contributions of Chinese immigrants
Japan Society	Midtown Manhattan	Manhattan	Cultural	Features exhibit gallery for Japanese art
Jacques Marchais Museum of Tibetan Art	Egbertville	Staten Island	Art	Art and artifacts of the Himalayas
Tibet House US	Chelsea	Manhattan	Art	Classical and contemporary Tibetan art
Rubin Museum of Art	Chelsea	Manhattan	Art	Art of the Himalayas and surrounding regions
Nicholas Roerich Museum	Upper West Side	Manhattan	Art	Works by Nicholas Roerich
Gallery Korea	Midtown Manhattan	Manhattan	Art	Part of the Korean Center Cultural Service; contemporary Korean art
Korea Society	Midtown Manhattan	Manhattan	Art	Cultural society with gallery of Korean art and culture
Pearl River Mart	Lower Manhattan	Manhattan	Culture	Experiential retail with cultural performances and events. Houses one of the few galleries in Lower Manhattan dedicated to showing works important to Asian American communities.

==== Indigenous and African Caribbean in Latin America ====
Name	Neighborhood	Borough	Type	Summary
Americas Society	Upper East Side	Manhattan	Art	Exhibits of historic and contemporary art from Latin America, the Caribbean and Canada
El Museo del Barrio	Museum Mile	Manhattan	Art	Latin American and Caribbean art, with an emphasis on works from Puerto Rico and the Puerto Rican community in New York City.
The Clemente Soto Velez Cultural and Educational Center	Lower East Side	Manhattan	Art	Performance, visual arts, and community events that reflect the cultural diversity of the Lower East Side

==== European Jewish and Jewish American ====
Name	Neighborhood	Borough	Type	Summary
American Sephardi Federation	Lower Manhattan	Manhattan	Ethnic – Jewish	Exhibits about the heritage of all Sephardim from the Iberian Peninsula and the Balkans, to the Jews of North Africa and Muslim lands including Iraq, Iran, Syria, Turkey, Yemen, Ethiopia and Bukharian Jews
Amud Aish Memorial Museum	Mill Basin	Brooklyn	Jewish	website, Living memorial to victims of the Holocaust
Anne Frank Center USA			History	website, uses the diary and spirit of Anne Frank to promote tolerance and human rights
Bernard Museum of Judaica	Upper East Side	Manhattan	Jewish	website, located in Temple Emanu-El, Jewish art, religious ornaments and temple memorabilia
Center for Jewish History	Lower Manhattan	Manhattan	Jewish	Jewish history and culture around the world
Derfner Judaica Museum	Riverdale	Bronx	Jewish	Includes the art collection at the Hebrew Home at Riverdale
Eldridge Street Synagogue	Lower East Side	Manhattan	Jewish	American Jewish history and culture in a restored historic synagogue
Hebrew Union College-Jewish Institute of Religion	Greenwich Village	Manhattan	Jewish	website, part of Hebrew Union College; art exploring Jewish identity, history, culture, and experience
Jewish Children's Museum	Crown Heights	Brooklyn	Children's / ethnic Jewish	Jewish heritage, fostering tolerance and understanding
Jewish Museum (New York)	Museum Mile	Manhattan	Jewish	Modern and contemporary Jewish art and history
Jewish Theological Seminary	Upper West Side	Manhattan	Jewish	website, free exhibitions from the library's collections of Jewish heritage
Living Torah Museum	Borough Park	Brooklyn	Jewish	Ancient artifacts mentioned in the Torah, items from the Biblical period
Museum of Jewish Heritage	Battery Park City	Manhattan	Jewish	Modern Jewish history and the Holocaust
Yeshiva University Museum	Chelsea	Manhattan	Jewish	Also an archaeology, history and art museum focused on Jewish subjects

==== Western by era ====
===== Traditional European art =====
Name	Neighborhood	Borough	Type	Summary
The Cloisters	Washington Heights	Manhattan	Art	Art and architecture of the European Middle Ages; branch of the Metropolitan Museum of Art
Frick Collection	Upper East Side	Manhattan	Art	Old Master paintings and Renaissance art displayed in Gilded Age mansion
Dahesh Museum of Art	Hudson Square	Manhattan	Art	Currently constructing new permanent home in Manhattan, European academic art of the 19th and 20th century
Hispanic Society of America	Washington Heights	Manhattan	Art	Art of Spain, Portugal and, to a lesser extent, Latin America from the Middle Ages through the 1920s

===== Modern art =====
Name	Neighborhood	Borough	Type	Summary
Guggenheim Museum	Museum Mile	Manhattan	Art	Designed by Frank Lloyd Wright, Impressionist, Post-Impressionist, early Modern and contemporary art
Museum of Modern Art (MoMA)	Midtown Manhattan	Manhattan	Art	Modern art including architecture and design, drawings, painting, sculpture, photography, prints, illustrated books and artist's books, film and electronic media
Neue Galerie	Museum Mile	Manhattan	Art	Gallery of early-20th-century German and Austrian art and design
Whitney Museum of American Art	Meatpacking District	Manhattan	Art	20th-century American art
Brant Foundation	East Village	Manhattan	Art	modern and contemporary art
Hill Art Foundation	Chelsea	Manhattan	Art	modern and contemporary art; Renaissance sculpture

==== Other Western and Native American ====
Name	Neighborhood	Borough	Type	Summary
Austrian Cultural Forum New York	Midtown Manhattan	Manhattan	Culture	website, culture center with exhibition gallery
Instituto Cervantes New York	Midtown Manhattan	Manhattan	Culture	website, culture center, conferences, largest Spanish library in New York, exhibition gallery
Czech Centre New York	Upper East Side	Manhattan	Art	website, exhibits of Czech artists, located in Bohemian National Hall
Swiss Institute	Lower Manhattan	Manhattan	Art	website, contemporary art
Scandinavia House – The Nordic Center in America	Midtown Manhattan	Manhattan	Cultural	Art, design, and historical exhibitions of the Nordic countries
Ukrainian Museum	East Village	Manhattan	Ethnic – Ukrainian-American	Ukrainian heritage in America
Garibaldi-Meucci Museum	Rosebank	Staten Island	Ethnic	Home of Italian politician Giuseppe Garibaldi and inventor Antonio Meucci, celebrates Italian American culture and heritage
American Folk Art Museum	Upper West Side	Manhattan	Art	American folk art
George Gustav Heye Center (National Museum of the American Indian)	Financial District	Manhattan	Native American	Part of the Smithsonian; Native American history, culture and art
Goethe-Institut, New York	Lower East Side	Manhattan	German culture	Part of the Goethe-Institut worldwide association

=== Artistic medium ===
==== Books, drawings, illustrations, prints ====
Name	Neighborhood	Borough	Type	Summary
Columbia University Rare Book & Manuscript Library	Upper West Side	Manhattan	Library	website, two galleries with free exhibitions from the collections
Grolier Club	Upper East Side	Manhattan	Literary	Public exhibitions from its book and literary collections
Drawing Center	SoHo	Manhattan	Art	Contemporary and historical drawings
Museum of American Illustration	Midtown Manhattan	Manhattan	Art	website, part of the Society of Illustrators; American illustration
Print Center New York	Chelsea	Manhattan	Art	Exhibition and understanding of fine art prints
The Morgan Library & Museum	Midtown Manhattan	Manhattan	Art	Includes books and printed materials, prints, and drawings of European artists, material from ancient Egypt and medieval liturgical objects, ancient Near Eastern cylinder seals, music manuscripts
New York Public Library	Midtown Manhattan	Manhattan	Multiple	Exhibitions at the main branch about art, history, culture, photography from its collections

==== Photography, film, new media ====
Name	Neighborhood	Borough	Type	Summary
Alice Austen House	Rosebank	Staten Island	Historic house	Home of photographer Alice Austen, also features photography exhibitions
BRIC	Fort Greene	Brooklyn	Art	website, contemporary art
Eyebeam Art and Technology Center	Chelsea	Manhattan	Art	Art and technology exhibitions, resident artistries
Aperture Foundation	Chelsea	Manhattan	Photography	Photography book and magazine publisher, photography exhibitions, workshops, artist talks, education programs
Hall des Lumieres	Lower Manhattan	Manhattan	Digital art space	Digital art space in the former Emigrant Savings Bank building
International Center of Photography	Chelsea	Manhattan	Photography	Photography exhibits
Paley Center for Media	Midtown Manhattan	Manhattan	Media	Cultural, creative and social significance of television, radio, the Internet and emerging media platforms
Museum of the Moving Image	Astoria	Queens	Media	Art, history, technique and technology of film, television, digital media, video games
Fotografiska New York	Gramercy Park, Manhattan	Manhattan	Media	Photography: emerging and established artists

==== Sculpture ====
Name	Neighborhood	Borough	Type	Summary
Noguchi Museum	Long Island City	Queens	Art	Works by sculptor Isamu Noguchi
SculptureCenter	Long Island City	Queens	Art	Dedicated to experimental and innovative developments in contemporary sculpture
Socrates Sculpture Park	Astoria	Queens	Art	Sculpture park
Chaim Gross Studio Museum	Greenwich Village	Manhattan	Art	website, operated by the Renee and Chaim Gross Foundation, home and studio of Chaim Gross

==== Design, decorative arts, architecture ====
Name	Neighborhood	Borough	Type	Summary
Bard Graduate Center	Upper West Side	Manhattan	Art	Annually organizes two to three exhibitions related to decorative arts, architecture and design
AIGA National Design Center	Flatiron District	Manhattan	Art	website, public gallery of the AIGA dedicated to presenting examples of outstanding contemporary design
Center for Architecture	Greenwich Village	Manhattan	Art	Exhibits of architecture, urban planning, urban design and environmental planning
Cooper–Hewitt, National Design Museum	Museum Mile	Manhattan	Design	Part of the Smithsonian, decorative arts and design
Museum of Arts and Design	Upper West Side	Manhattan	Art	Features contemporary hand-made objects in a variety of media, including clay, glass, metal, fiber and wood; located at Columbus Circle
Museum at FIT	Chelsea	Manhattan	Textile	Fashion museum, part of Fashion Institute of Technology
National Academy of Design	Museum Mile	Manhattan	Art	Exhibits of art and architecture from its collections
New York School of Interior Design Gallery	Midtown Manhattan	Manhattan	Art	website, free gallery with exhibits about interior design
Parsons The New School for Design Sheila C. Johnson Design Center	Greenwich Village	Manhattan	Art	Contains two galleries: The Anna-Maria and Stephen Kellen Gallery and the smaller Arnold and Sheila Aronson Galleries
Skyscraper Museum	Battery Park City	Manhattan	Architecture	Currently the only museum in the world dedicated to skyscrapers

=== Entertainment ===
==== Performing arts ====
Name	Neighborhood	Borough	Type	Summary
Brooklyn Jazz Hall of Fame and Museum	Central Brooklyn	Brooklyn	Jazz	Individuals who have made significant contributions to the music genre of jazz
National Jazz Museum in Harlem	Harlem	Manhattan	Music	Harlem's jazz history
Louis Armstrong House	Corona	Queens	Historic house	Home of musician Louis Armstrong
Rose Museum	Midtown Manhattan	Manhattan	Music	Chronicles the history Carnegie Hall from the collections of its archives
Enrico Caruso Museum of America	Homecrest	Brooklyn	Biographical	website, open on Sundays; the life of opera tenor Enrico Caruso
New York Public Library for the Performing Arts	Upper West Side	Manhattan	Art	Exhibitions about the performing arts, located at Lincoln Center for the Performing Arts
Museum of Broadway	Midtown Manhattan	Manhattan	Broadway theatre	Museum dedicated to documenting the history and experience of Broadway theatre

==== Amusements ====
Name	Neighborhood	Borough	Type	Summary
Coney Island Museum	Coney Island	Brooklyn	Amusement	History of Coney Island's amusement park
Madame Tussauds New York	Midtown Manhattan	Manhattan	Wax museum	Famous figures in entertainment
Toy Museum of NY	Boerum Hill	Brooklyn	Toy	Traveling displays, includes children's theatre performance, classic dolls, toy soldiers, trains and trolleys, board games, electronic toys
National Track and Field Hall of Fame	Washington Heights	Manhattan	Sports	Operated by the Armory Foundation in conjunction with USA Track & Field
Mets Hall of Fame & Museum	Flushing	Queens	Sports	Located at Citi Field; the New York Mets' baseball history

=== Science ===
Name	Neighborhood	Borough	Type	Summary
American Museum of Natural History	Upper West Side	Manhattan	Natural history	Includes Rose Center for Earth and Space
New York Botanical Garden	Fordham	Bronx	Botanical garden	Includes Mertz Library with exhibitions relating to botanical themes and the Enid A. Haupt Conservatory
New York Hall of Science	Flushing	Queens	Science	Topics include biology, chemistry and physics
National Museum of Mathematics	Rose Hill	Manhattan	Science	Interactive exhibits about mathematics
Wave Hill	Riverdale	Bronx	Botanical garden	Botanical garden with art gallery and interpretive visitors' center
Brooklyn Botanic Garden	Prospect Heights	Brooklyn	Botanical Garden	Specialty plant collections with labels and interpretation, library, art gallery, visitors' center

=== History ===
==== American history, local history, historic monuments ====
Name	Neighborhood	Borough	Type	Summary
Ellis Island National Museum of Immigration	Ellis Island	Manhattan	History	Tours by boat from Battery Park in Manhattan or Liberty State Park in Jersey City, New Jersey; immigration experience and history of the immigrants
Federal Hall National Memorial	Lower Manhattan	Manhattan	History	Site of first capitol of the United States and of George Washington's first inauguration in 1789
Fraunces Tavern	Lower Manhattan	Manhattan	History	Reconstruction of a tavern with a prominent role in pre-Revolution and American Revolution history
General Grant National Memorial	Upper West Side	Manhattan	Biographical	Mausoleum of General Ulysses Grant and his wife; displays about his life and Presidency
Lower East Side Tenement Museum	Lower East Side	Manhattan	History	Immigrants' experience
Museum of Public Relations	Midtown	Manhattan	Media	website, a public relations museum and reference library, part of Baruch College’s Newman Library Archives and Special Collections, open to the public by appointment for tours, guest lectures and research
Museum of the City of New York	Museum Mile	Manhattan	Multiple	Art and local history
National September 11 Memorial & Museum	Financial District	Manhattan	Memorial	Memorial and museum dedicated to victims of 9/11 attacks
New-York Historical Society	Upper West Side	Manhattan	History	History of New York and the United States
Statue of Liberty	Liberty Island	Manhattan	History	Accessible by boat from Battery Park in Manhattan and Liberty State Park in Jersey City, New Jersey
Trinity Church	Lower Manhattan	Manhattan	History	History of the church, changing art, religious and cultural exhibits
Center for Brooklyn History	Brooklyn Heights	Brooklyn	Local history	History and culture of Brooklyn, formerly known as the Brooklyn Historical Society
City Reliquary	Williamsburg	Brooklyn	Local history	website, memorabilia and artifacts about New York City
Hall of Fame for Great Americans	University Heights	Bronx	Hall of fame	Part of Bronx Community College, National Landmark founded as a Pantheon honoring historically significant American men and women
Bayside Historical Society	Bayside	Queens	Local history	website, located in the Officer's Club in Fort Totten
Greater Astoria Historical Society	Astoria	Queens	Local history	

==== Military, police, fire ====
Name	Neighborhood	Borough	Type	Summary
Castle Clinton	Lower Manhattan	Manhattan	History	Fort that contains a museum which is administered by the National Park Service, and is a departure point for visitors to the Statue of Liberty and Ellis Island
Castle Williams	Governors Island	Manhattan	Military	Tours of the 1807 fort and prison
FDNY Fire Zone	Midtown	Manhattan	Firefighting	website, fire safety learning center, located in Rockefeller Center
Intrepid Sea, Air & Space Museum	Hell's Kitchen	Manhattan	Military	Showcases the World War II aircraft carrier USS Intrepid, Space Shuttle Enterprise, submarine USS Growler, a Concorde supersonic airplane, helicopters and military aircraft
New York City Fire Museum	SoHo	Manhattan	Firefighting	Historical and modern firefighting vehicles, equipment, uniforms
New York City Police Museum	Financial District	Manhattan	Law enforcement	Closed in 2014, plans unclear
Harbor Defense Museum	Bay Ridge	Brooklyn	Military	Located in Fort Hamilton, 19th-century fort with exhibits of NY military history
Hall of Fame for Great Americans	University Heights	Bronx	Hall of fame	Part of Bronx Community College, National Landmark founded as a Pantheon honoring historically significant American men and women
Fort Totten	Bayside	Queens	Military	Tours of the Civil War-era fort
Fort Wadsworth	Fort Wadsworth	Staten Island	Military	Exhibits and tours of the mid-19th-century fort

==== Transportation and maritime ====
Name	Neighborhood	Borough	Type	Summary
New York Transit Museum	Brooklyn Heights	Brooklyn	Transportation	Subways, trolleys and buses
New York Transit Museum	Midtown Manhattan	Manhattan	Transportation	Subways, trolleys and buses; annex of main Brooklyn location, in Grand Central Terminal
Lilac Preservation Project	Tribeca	Manhattan	Maritime	Preservation of the USCGC Lilac. website
City Island Nautical Museum	City Island	Bronx	Maritime	website, operated by the City Island Historical Society
Maritime Industry Museum	Throggs Neck	Bronx	Maritime	Located in Fort Schuyler, history of the US maritime industry including commercial shipping, the merchant marine, and the port of New York
Noble Maritime Collection	West New Brighton	Staten Island	Maritime	Part of Snug Harbor Cultural Center, houseboat and artist studio
South Street Seaport Museum	Financial District	Manhattan	Maritime	Includes exhibition galleries, a working 19th-century print shop, an archeology museum and several historic museum ships, including the four-masted Peking
Waterfront Museum	Red Hook	Brooklyn	Maritime	website, historic floating barge museum in Red Hook

==== Financial ====
Name	Neighborhood	Borough	Type	Summary
Museum of American Finance	unhoused	Manhattan	Industry – finance	Financial markets, money, banking, entrepreneurship and Alexander Hamilton
Federal Reserve Bank of New York	Financial District	Manhattan	Finance	Museum and gold vault tour
American Numismatic Society Museum	Lower Manhattan	Manhattan	Numismatic	Exhibits of coins and medals from all periods and cultures
Mossman Lock Museum	Midtown Manhattan	Manhattan	Commodity	Bank and vault locks and cases; part of the General Society of Mechanics and Tradesmen of the City of New York

==== Historic houses ====
Name	Neighborhood	Borough	Type	Summary
Bartow-Pell Mansion	Pelham Bay	Bronx	Historic house	Mid-19th-century period mansion and gardens
Billiou-Stillwell-Perine House	Old Town	Staten Island	Historic house	17th-century Dutch colonial house, operated by Historic Richmond Town
Bowne House	Flushing	Queens	Historic house	Oldest house in Queens, dates back to the mid-1600s
Conference House	Tottenville	Staten Island	Historic house	Only pre-Revolutionary manor house still surviving in New York City
Dyckman Farmhouse Museum	Inwood	Manhattan	Historic house	Late 18th-century farmhouse, the oldest remaining farmhouse on Manhattan island
Edgar Allan Poe Cottage	Fordham	Bronx	Historic house	1840s house where author Edgar Allan Poe lived
Gracie Mansion	Upper East Side	Manhattan	Historic house	Official residence of the Mayor of New York City
Hamilton Grange National Memorial	Hamilton Heights	Manhattan	Historic house	Relocated early 19th-century home of Alexander Hamilton
King Manor	Jamaica	Queens	Historic house	Early 19th-century period home of Rufus King, a signer of the United States Constitution
Kingsland Homestead	Flushing	Queens	Historic house	Member of the Historic House Trust, operated by the Queens Historical Society; Victorian period house, local history exhibits
Lefferts Historic House	Park Slope	Brooklyn	Historic house	Located in Prospect Park, 1820s period house
Louis Armstrong House	Corona	Queens	Historic House	Original home and furnishings of Jazz trumpeter and pop icon Louis Armstrong
Merchant's House Museum	Greenwich Village	Manhattan	Historic house	19th-century family town home
Morris-Jumel Mansion	Washington Heights	Manhattan	Historic house	18th-century period mansion used as headquarters for both sides in the American Revolution
Mount Vernon Hotel Museum	Midtown Manhattan	Manhattan	Historic house	Early 19th-century period hotel
Seguine Mansion	South Shore	Staten Island	Historic house	Mid-19th-century mansion
Theodore Roosevelt Birthplace National Historic Site	Flatiron District	Manhattan	Historic house	Recreated brownstone where Theodore Roosevelt lived as a child
Valentine-Varian House	Norwood	Bronx	Historic house	Houses the Museum of Bronx History, operated by the Bronx Historical Society
Van Cortlandt House Museum	Riverdale	Bronx	Historic house	18th-century period manor house
Vander Ende-Onderdonk House	Ridgewood	Queens	Historic house	Oldest Dutch Colonial stone house in New York City, operated by the Greater Ridgewood Historical Society
Voelker Orth Museum	Flushing	Queens	Historic house	Family home dating back to 1891
Wyckoff House	Canarsie	Brooklyn	Historic house	Dutch saltbox frame house dating back to 1652
Queens County Farm Museum	Glen Oaks	Queens	Farm	Working farm dating back to 1697
Old Stone House	Park Slope	Brooklyn	Historic house	Reconstructed 1699 Dutch stone farmhouse with Revolutionary War ties, focuses on evolving histories of Brooklyn, New York and the United States
Historic Richmond Town	Richmondtown	Staten Island	Living	Over 30 historic buildings and sites dating from the late 17th to the early 20th century; includes the Lake-Tysen House and Voorlezer's House

=== Children's ===
Name	Neighborhood	Borough	Type	Summary
Bronx Children's Museum	Concourse	The Bronx	Children's	
Brooklyn Children's Museum	Crown Heights	Brooklyn	Children's	
Children's Cultural Center of Native America	Washington Heights	Manhattan	Children's	website, located in the Church of the Intercession
Children's Museum of Manhattan	Upper West Side	Manhattan	Children's	
Girl Scout Museum	Garment District	Manhattan	Scouting	History of the Girl Scouts of the USA
Lefferts Historic House	Park Slope	Brooklyn	Historic house	Located in Prospect Park, 1820s period house and children's museum
Sugar Hill Children's Museum	Sugar Hill	Manhattan	Children's	art and art education for children
Staten Island Children's Museum	West New Brighton	Staten Island	Children's	Part of Snug Harbor Cultural Center

=== Contemporary spaces ===
==== Contemporary museums ====
Name	Neighborhood	Borough	Type	Summary
Dia:Chelsea	Chelsea	Manhattan	Art	Contemporary art
The Living Museum	Queens Village	Queens	Art	Part of Creedmoor Psychiatric Center; art dedicated to, and created by, individuals with a mental illness
Newhouse Center for Contemporary Art	West New Brighton	Staten Island	Art	Part of Snug Harbor Cultural Center; contemporary art
New Museum	East Village	Manhattan	Art	Contemporary art from around the world
Park Avenue Armory	Upper East Side	Manhattan	Art	Presents art exhibitions
MoMA PS1	Long Island City	Queens	Art	Contemporary art museum, part of Museum of Modern Art

==== Contemporary galleries ====
Name	Neighborhood	Borough	Type	Summary
The 8th Floor	Chelsea	Manhattan	Art	Specializes art and social justice
Anita Shapolsky Gallery	Upper East Side	Manhattan	Art	Specializes in abstract expressionism; exhibits expressionism, geometric abstraction, and painterly abstraction
Art in General	Lower Manhattan	Manhattan	Art	Contemporary art space
FusionArts Museum	Lower East Side	Manhattan	Art	Contemporary art space
Interference Archive	Gowanus	Brooklyn	Art	Archive, library, and gallery of social movement art and ephemera
New York Earth Room	SoHo	Manhattan	Art	Permanent exhibit of earth covered room
White Columns	Greenwich Village	Manhattan	Art	Alternative art gallery
Williamsburg Biannual	Williamsburg	Brooklyn	Art	Contemporary Art Space

==== Neighborhood art centers ====
Name	Neighborhood	Borough	Type	Summary
Bronx River Art Center	West Farms	Bronx	Art	website
Jamaica Center for Arts & Learning	Jamaica	Queens	Art	Cultural center with art gallery
Longwood Art Gallery	South Bronx	Bronx	Art	website; Located in the Hostos Community College campus, and sponsored by the Bronx Council on the Arts
RestorationArt	Bedford–Stuyvesant	Brooklyn	Art	website, cultural and performing arts center with the Skylight Gallery for visual art
Williamsburg Art & Historical Center	Williamsburg	Brooklyn	Art	Art exhibitions, performances and cultural events

=== Miscellaneous ===
Name	Neighborhood	Borough	Type	Summary
AKC Museum of the Dog	Park Avenue	Manhattan	History and Art	The museum features exhibits that include: Dogs in film, dogs of presidents, war dogs, dogs in exploration. The museum features one of the largest collections of dog-related art.
American Academy of Arts and Letters	Washington Heights	Manhattan	Art	Exhibitions in American literature, music, and art
Cooper Union Galleries	East Village	Manhattan	Art	Several galleries with works by students, faculty and guest artists in art, architecture, design, photography
Fordham Museum of Greek, Etruscan and Roman Art	Fordham	Bronx	Art	Collection of ancient antiquities in William D. Walsh Family Library of Fordham University
Front Room Gallery	Lower East Side	Manhattan	Art	Contemporary art gallery
Godwin-Ternbach Museum	Kew Gardens Hills	Queens	Art	Part of Queens College, City University of New York; collection includes painting, sculpture and decorative arts, prints and drawings, and ethnographic arts
Grey Art Gallery	Greenwich Village	Manhattan	Art	website, part of New York University
House of Cannabis	SoHo	Manhattan	Art	
Lehman College Art Gallery	Bronx	Bronx	Art	website
Leslie-Lohman Museum of Art	SoHo	Manhattan	Art	Contemporary and historical gay-related art
Mercer Labs	Tribeca	Manhattan	Art	Digital art
Miriam and Ira D. Wallach Art Gallery	Upper West Side	Manhattan	Art	website, part of Columbia University
Mmuseumm	TriBeCa	Manhattan	History	Curated display of artifacts housed in a freight elevator.
Museum of Reclaimed Urban Space	East Village	Manhattan	History	History of grassroots urban space activism
Museum of Sex	Rose Hill	Manhattan	Sex	History, evolution and cultural significance of human sexuality
Poppenhusen Institute	College Point	Queens	History	Community cultural center with historic and cultural exhibits
Poster House	Chelsea	Manhattan	Art	Posters as art
Queens College Art Center	Flushing	Queens	Art	website
Tibor de Nagy Gallery	Midtown Manhattan	Manhattan	Art	Contemporary painting, sculpture and photography; presents works from the gallery's rich history
THNK1994	Bedford-Stuyvesant	Brooklyn	Feminist Pop Culture	website, art inspired by and impact of the 1994 attack of Nancy Kerrigan by Tonya Harding
United Nations Headquarters	Midtown Manhattan	Manhattan	Historic building	Includes exhibits on such topics as peacekeeping operations, decolonization and disarmament, and the United Nations Art Collection

=== Defunct museums ===
- American Museum of Immigration, Liberty Island
- Barnum's American Museum, Manhattan
- Chelsea Art Museum, Manhattan, closed in 2011
- Children's Museum of the Arts, closed in 2022 and declared bankruptcy in 2024.
- Con Edison Energy Museum, Manhattan
- Choco-Story New York, 2017-2019
- Discovery Times Square Exposition, closed in 2016
- Fisher Landau Center, Long Island City, closed in 2017
- Forbes Galleries, closed in 2014
- Ground Zero Museum Workshop, history of the September 11 attacks and the workers at the World Trade Center site. Status unknown after 2014
- Guggenheim Soho, Manhattan
- Kurdish Library and Museum, Brooklyn, collections now owned by Binghamton University
- Met Breuer, building turned over to the Frick for temporary use.
- MICRO Museum, Brooklyn, closed exhibit space
- Morbid Anatomy Museum, Brooklyn, closed in 2016
- Museum of the American Piano, Manhattan, website
- Museum of Biblical Art, closed in 2015
- Museum of Comic and Cartoon Art, closed in 2012, collections now part of the Society of Illustrators
- Museum of Primitive Art, closed in 1976, collections now part of the Metropolitan Museum of Art
- National Museum of Catholic Art and History, closed in 2010
- New York Jazz Museum, Manhattan
- New York Tattoo Museum
- Onassis Cultural Center
- Ripley's Believe It or Not!, Manhattan, closed in 2021.
- Rock and Roll Hall of Fame Annex, opened in Soho in 2008, closed in 2010
- Sony Wonder Technology Lab, closed in 2016
- Sports Museum of America, Manhattan, opened in 2008, closed in 2009
- 9/11 Tribute Museum, Manhattan, opened in 2006. Closed its physical location in 2022.

=== Proposed museums ===
- Climate Museum
- Museum of Food and Drink
- Museum of the Street

== Zoos and gardens ==
- Bronx Zoo
- Brooklyn Botanic Garden
- Central Park Zoo
- Community gardens in New York City
- Jamaica Bay Wildlife Refuge
- New York Aquarium
- New York Botanical Garden
- Prospect Park Zoo
- Queens Botanical Garden
- Queen Elizabeth II September 11th Garden (formerly the British Garden)
- Queens Zoo
- Queens County Farm Museum
- Staten Island Botanical Garden
  - The New York Chinese Scholar's Garden
- Staten Island Zoo
- Wave Hill

== Performing arts ==
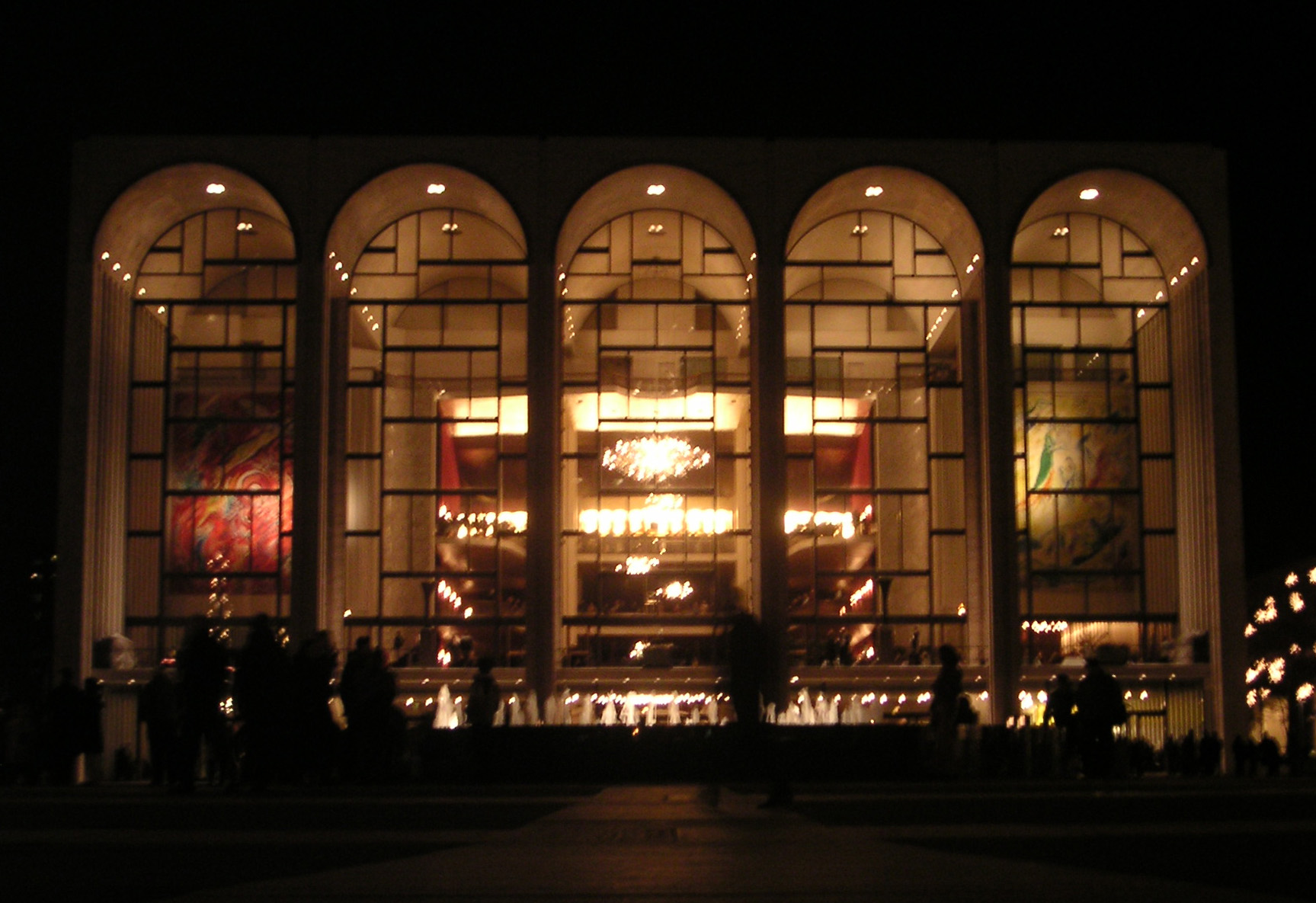
The Metropolitan Opera at Lincoln Center

=== Lincoln Center ===
- Alice Tully Hall
- David Geffen Hall, formerly known as Avery Fisher Hall, home of the New York Philharmonic
- David H. Koch Theater, formerly known as the New York State Theater, home to New York City Ballet
- Film Society of Lincoln Center
- Jazz at Lincoln Center
- The Juilliard School
- Metropolitan Opera
- New York Public Library for the Performing Arts
- Vivian Beaumont Theater

=== Music ===
- Bargemusic
- Brooklyn Symphony Orchestra
- Carnegie Hall
- City Parks Foundation
- Kaufman Music Center
- Manhattan School of Music
- Mannes College of Music
- New York City Opera
- The New York Pops
- Symphony Space

=== Theaters ===
- 92nd Street Y
- Apollo Theater
- The Billie Holiday Theatre
- Brooklyn Academy of Music
- Bowery Ballroom
- Film Forum
- Hammerstein Ballroom
- La MaMa Experimental Theatre Club
- New York City Center
- The Public Theater
- Radio City Music Hall
- Roundabout Theatre Company
- Samuel J. Friedman Theatre - formerly the Biltmore Theatre
- Skirball Center for the Performing Arts
- Snug Harbor Cultural Center
- The Town Hall
- Williamsburg Art & Historical Center

== Historically significant sites ==
=== Historic House Trust ===
Most of the following are Registered Historic Places covered in the county lists.

- Alice Austen House Museum
- Bartow-Pell Mansion Museum
- The Conference House
- Dyckman Farmhouse Museum
- Edgar Allan Poe Cottage
- Gracie Mansion
- Hendrick I. Lott House
- Historic Richmond Town
- King Manor Museum
- Kingsland Homestead, with "weeping beech tree"
- Lefferts Historic House
- Lewis H. Latimer House
- The Little Red Lighthouse
- Merchant's House Museum
- Morris-Jumel Mansion
- The Old Stone House
- Queens County Farm Museum
- Seguine Mansion
- Swedish Cottage Marionette Theatre
- Valentine-Varian House
- Van Cortlandt House Museum
- The Wyckoff Farmhouse Museum

=== National Parks of New York Harbor ===
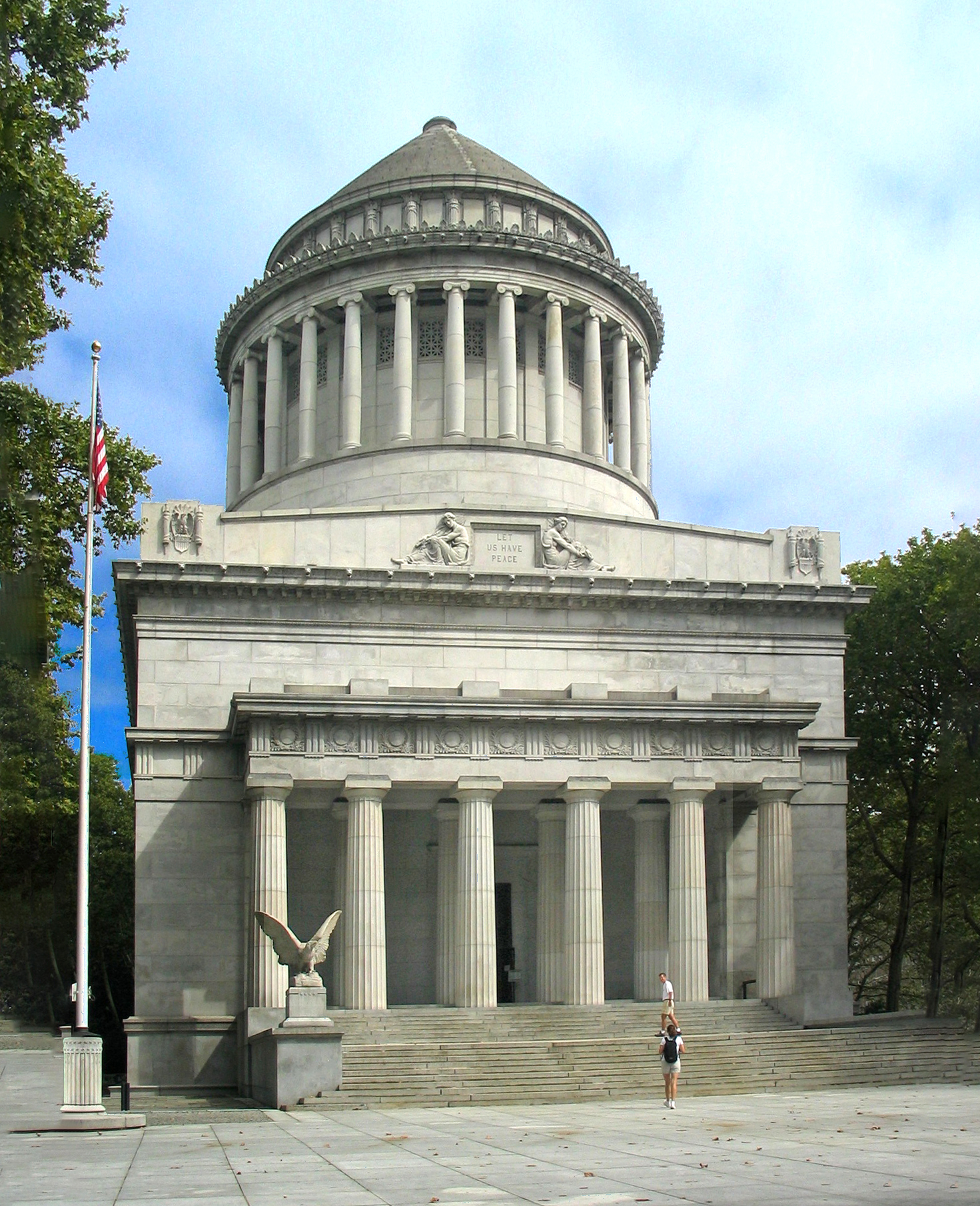
Grant's Tomb, 2004

Despite its name, National Parks of New York Harbor does not oversee any national parks proper.

- African Burial Ground National Monument
- Castle Clinton National Monument
- Federal Hall National Memorial
- Fort Wadsworth
- General Grant National Memorial
- Governors Island/Governors Island National Monument
- Hamilton Grange National Memorial
- Statue of Liberty National Monument (including Ellis Island, Statue of Liberty)
- Theodore Roosevelt Birthplace National Historic Site

=== World Trade Center site ===
- International Freedom Center
- National September 11 Memorial & Museum
- Tribute in Light

=== Other historic sites ===
- Brooklyn Navy Yard, building 92
- Fort Schuyler
- Lower East Side Tenement Museum
- Irish Hunger Memorial
- Trinity Churchyard
- Weeksville Heritage Center

== Libraries ==
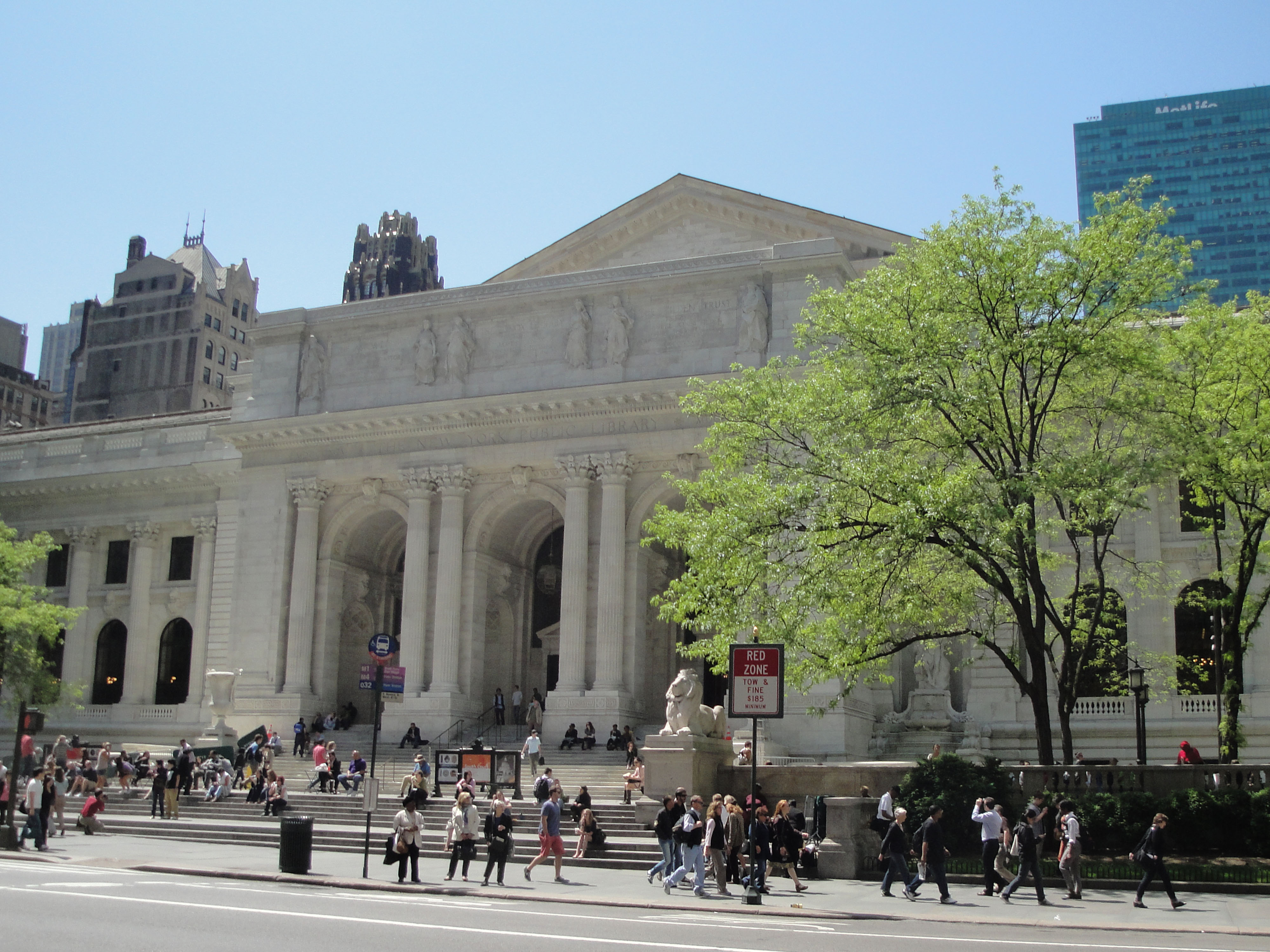
New York Public Library Main Branch located at Fifth Avenue and 42nd Street

- Biblioteca Instituto Cervantes
- Brooklyn Public Library
  - Central Library
  - List of Brooklyn Public Library branches
- Columbia University Libraries
  - Arthur W. Diamond Law Library
  - Avery Architectural and Fine Arts Library
  - Butler Library
  - C.V. Starr East Asian Library
  - Gottesman Libraries
  - Rare Book & Manuscript Library
- Cloisters Library and Archives
- Cooper-Hewitt, National Design Museum
- Dag Hammarskjöld Library
- Elmer Holmes Bobst Library at New York University
- Frick Art Reference Library
- The Morgan Library & Museum
- New York Public Library
  - Andrew Heiskell Braille and Talking Book Library
  - Bronx Library Center
  - New York Public Library for the Performing Arts
  - New York Public Library Main Branch
  - Science, Industry and Business Library
  - Schomburg Center for Research in Black Culture
  - List of New York Public Library branches
- New York Academy of Medicine Library
- New York Society Library
- Poets House
- Queens Public Library
  - List of Queens Public Library branches
- Shevchenko Scientific Society

== See also ==
- Cultural Institutions Group
- List of museums in New York
- List of university art museums and galleries in New York State
- Museum Mile, New York City
- Tourist attractions in New York City
