= Oleg Frish =

Russian-American entertainer

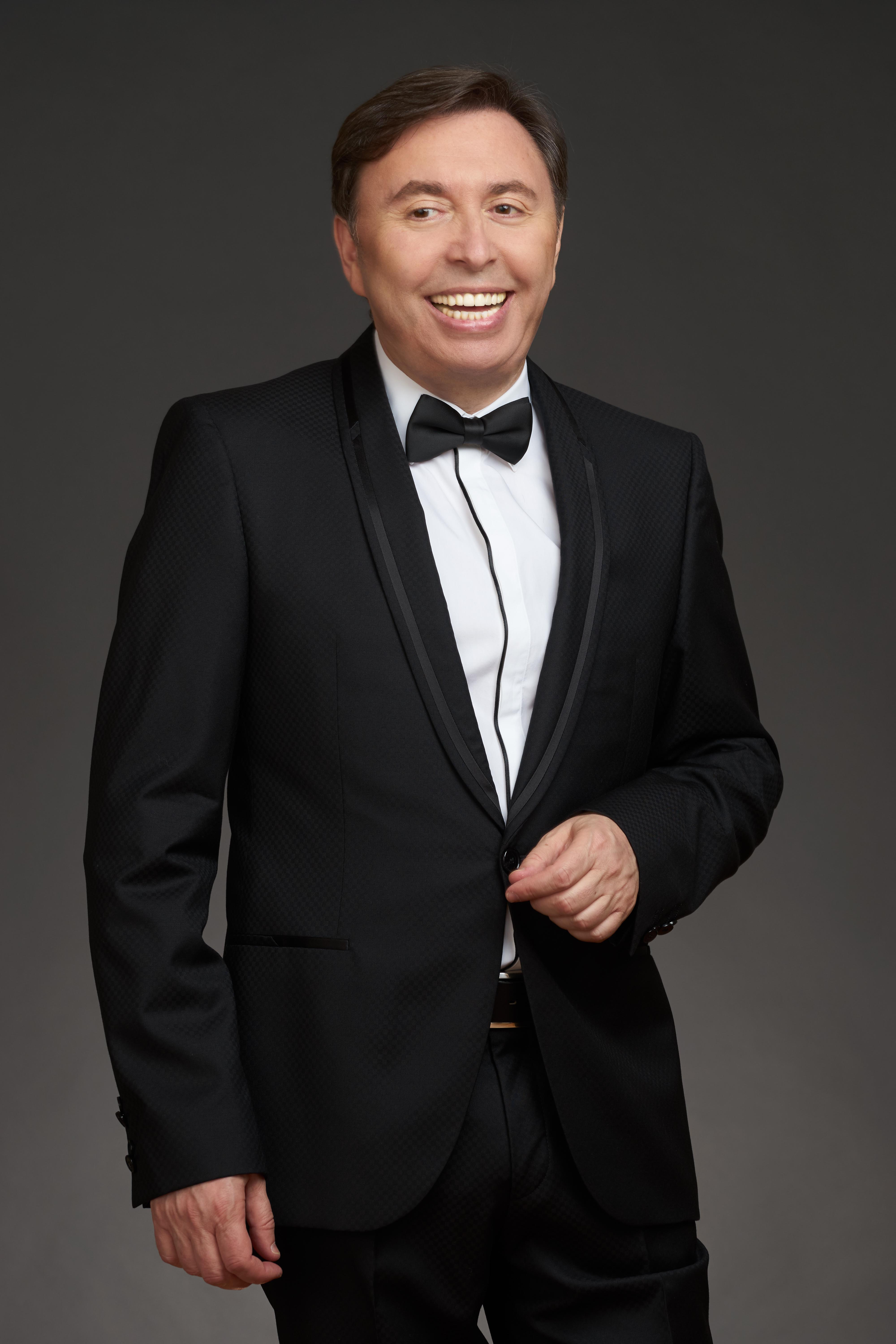
- Oleg Frish
- Born: Zaporizhia, USSR
- Education: Tver State University
- Occupations: Entertainer, singer, TV personality, radio personality
- Years active: 1977–present
- Website: OlegFrish.com

Oleg Frish is a Russian-American entertainer, singer, actor, television and radio personality, journalist, music historian, and is the Owner of New Age Media. Oleg was born in Zaporizhia, USSR into a family of musicians. His mother, Svetlana Frish, is a pianist and his father, Eugeny Frish, was longtime head of the children’s choir and an important member of the artistic community.

== Life and career in the USSR ==
At the age of 16, Oleg entered Tver State University and also went into entertainment. Among his first jobs, was that of a "singing psychic." As part of his act, he would guess what songs people in the audience were thinking about, and then he would sing them. In 1980, his "musical mind reading" skills lead to national recognition and in 1985 he received accreditation from one of the Soviet Union’s top cultural institutions, the Ministry of Culture of the USSR.

Oleg Frish sings in 24 different languages including Russian, English, Ukrainian, Japanese, Spanish, Polish, Hebrew, Yiddish, Yugoslavian, French, Icelandic, Latin, Italian, Portuguese among others.

In 1978, he moved to Moscow, where from 1978 to 1992 he was the writer for "Soviet stage and circus" magazine, a prominent performing arts magazine that covered the fields of music, variety and circus. He wrote such compositions including: The world in three minutes, A wonderful gift, "Psychological Experiments" - what is it? Art or trash?, Somewhere in this world, I can see how the planet spins, In a country which calls upon the distance, and We recorded time period.

In 1984, he earned induction into the Soviet branch of the International Brotherhood of Magicians.

In 1989, he earned a degree in the History of Variety and Cultural Arts from The National Research Institute of Arts Studies and developed an interest in promoting Russian "stars of the past". He then toured domestically and internationally, lecturing on show biz history to students and the general public, and gained a reputation as an expert in this area of study.

In 2000 and in 2004, he was officially recognized in the All-Russian Encyclopedia of Variety, which dedicated an article to his accomplishments for his work as historian and lecturer throughout Russia.

== Career in the USA ==
In 1992, as the Cold War barriers were eased, Oleg Frish decided to move to the New York area, because at that time New York City was by far the biggest metropolitan entry point for Russian-speaking émigrés, especially Brooklyn, Staten Island, Queens and Manhattan.

In 1992, Oleg started to host radio shows on the first Russian - American radio and television station WMNB (1992 - 2000).

In 1996, he became writer and host of the TV series "Walking The Streets of Moscow" for WMNB in Fort Lee, NJ, interviewing a wide variety of Russian-born entertainers including such Russian notables as Tatiana Samoilova, Elena Kamburova, Alla Pugacheva, Iosif Kobzon, Irina Ponarovskaya, Tamara Miansarova, Natalya Varley, Natalia Kustinskaya and many others who are celebrities for the Russian-American community. He also interviewed American singers, musicians and actors on The People’s Wave Radio 930AM in New York (1998 - 2005).

In 2002, NTV America, the leading Russian-language television channel, which combines the programming content of its sister network NTV Russia and original local programs from America, began broadcasting in Fort Lee, NJ.

In 2005, Oleg Frish became the Executive Producer of "Time Out", a Russian-language weekly television news and entertainment program that broadcast their first episode on May 15, 2005, on NTV America. In 2006, Oleg Frish also became the show’s host.

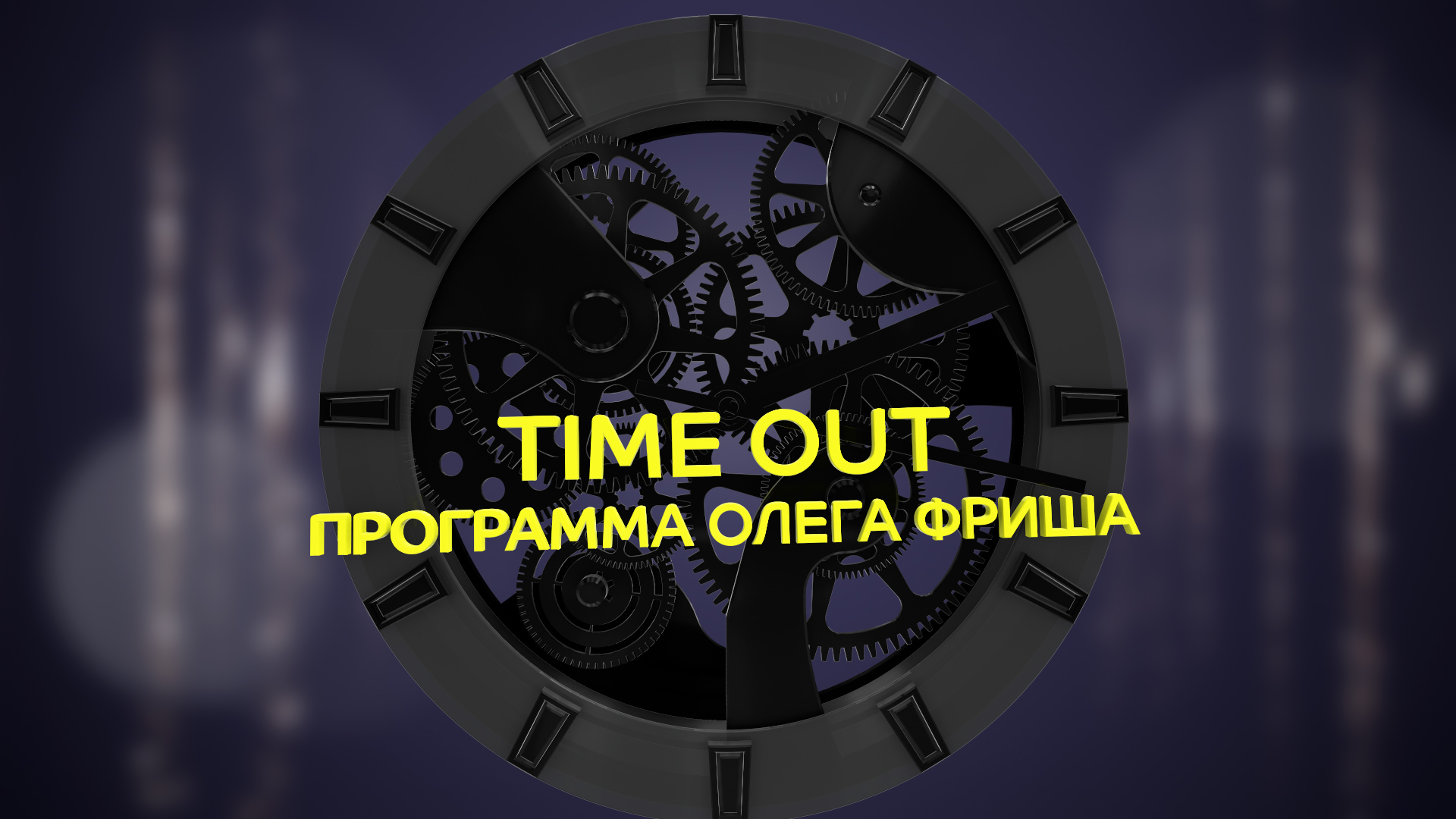

TIME OUT - Oleg Frish is the Executive Producer and the Host of 1500 episodes broadcast from 2005 to present on NTV America – a leading Russian TV Channel with headquarters in the US, broadcasting to 19 countries and reaching millions of people including the five million Russians living in the US. The program reviewed a variety of different topics including music business, pop-culture facts, interesting activities and unique locations, celebrity news and interviews and offered reviews of new releases of CDs, DVDs, upcoming movies, Broadway musicals and concert tours. Such celebrities as B.B. King, James Brown, Whoopi Goldberg, Claudia Schiffer, Vanessa Williams, Paul Anka, Dionne Warwick, Connie Francis, Neil Sedaka, Andy Williams, composers John Kander, Jerry Herman, Lalo Schifrin, Johnny Mandel, Vikki Carr, Petula Clark, Van Cliburn, Yma Sumac, Shirley Jones, Dudu Fisher, Keely Smith, Anita O'Day, Nancy Wilson, Gloria Gaynor, Brenda Lee, Engelbert Humperdinck, Jose Feliciano, Ute Lemper, Donna Summer and many others appeared on the show's 1500+ segments.

Such cultural locations as Graceland, Museum of Broadway, Memphis Music Hall of Fame and the Museum of Rock and Soul, as well as Long Island Music and Entertainment Hall of Fame, many jazz and rock "n" roll clubs were also featured in Time Out.

Oleg Frish had the honor of interviewing the legendary James Brown on Time Out episode#34 that aired on August 27, 2006, just 4 months prior to James Brown's death on December 25, 2006.

James Brown quoted: "Oleg remembers the songs I did, but I’ve forgotten a long time ago".

In 2012 - 2015, Oleg hosted "Standard Time with Oleg Frish" Saturdays from 5:00-6:00PM on WNYM-970AM in Metropolitan New York.

2026 marks the thirtieth anniversary of Oleg's status as a television personality in the United States.

== Recordings ==
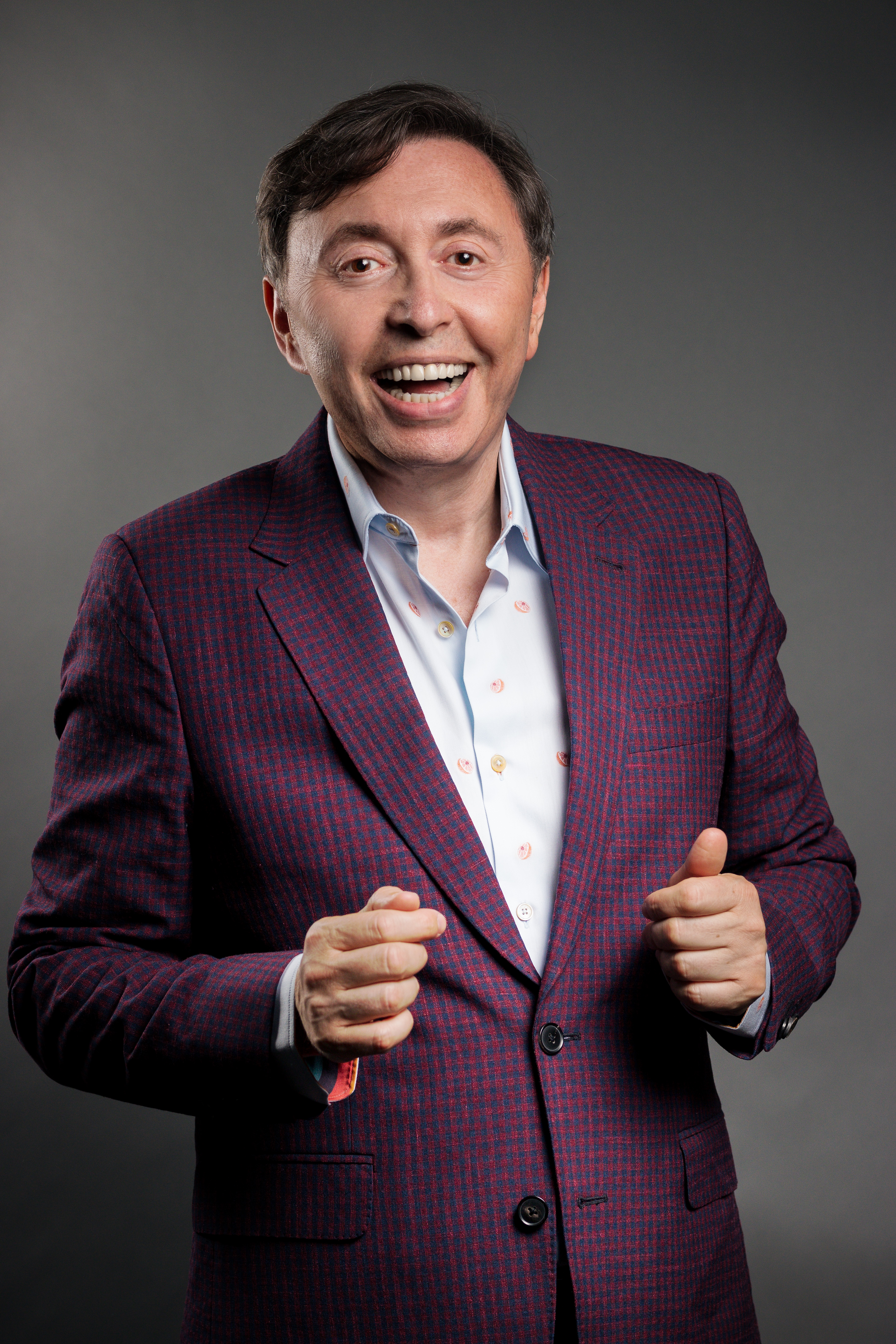
Oleg Frish

Oleg Frish's first album "Hello from Brighton" was recorded in 1991 and released in Moscow. In 1998, "Strange Love", the second album, was released in New York.

In 2010, Oleg recorded his first English-language album "Bring Me Sunshine", as his tribute to "The Great American Songbook". The album has Oleg’s vocals and arrangements by a big band leader Patrick Williams (a late period Frank Sinatra recording associate) and sound engineering by Al Schmitt, whose 60-year career yielded 150 gold and platinum albums, 20 Grammy Awards and who also recorded Ol' Blue Eyes. "Bring Me Sunshine" was produced at the legendary Capitol Records studios in Hollywood, CA.

Songwriter, Charles Strouse quoted: "The Great American Songbook, to which I am proud to be a contributor, is one of our greatest cultural exports, Oleg is a living example of what an impact this export has had. Far, far away, in the old Soviet Union where he grew up, he heard these songs and fell in love. It took him a while to record them but I know it's been one of his lifelong dreams."

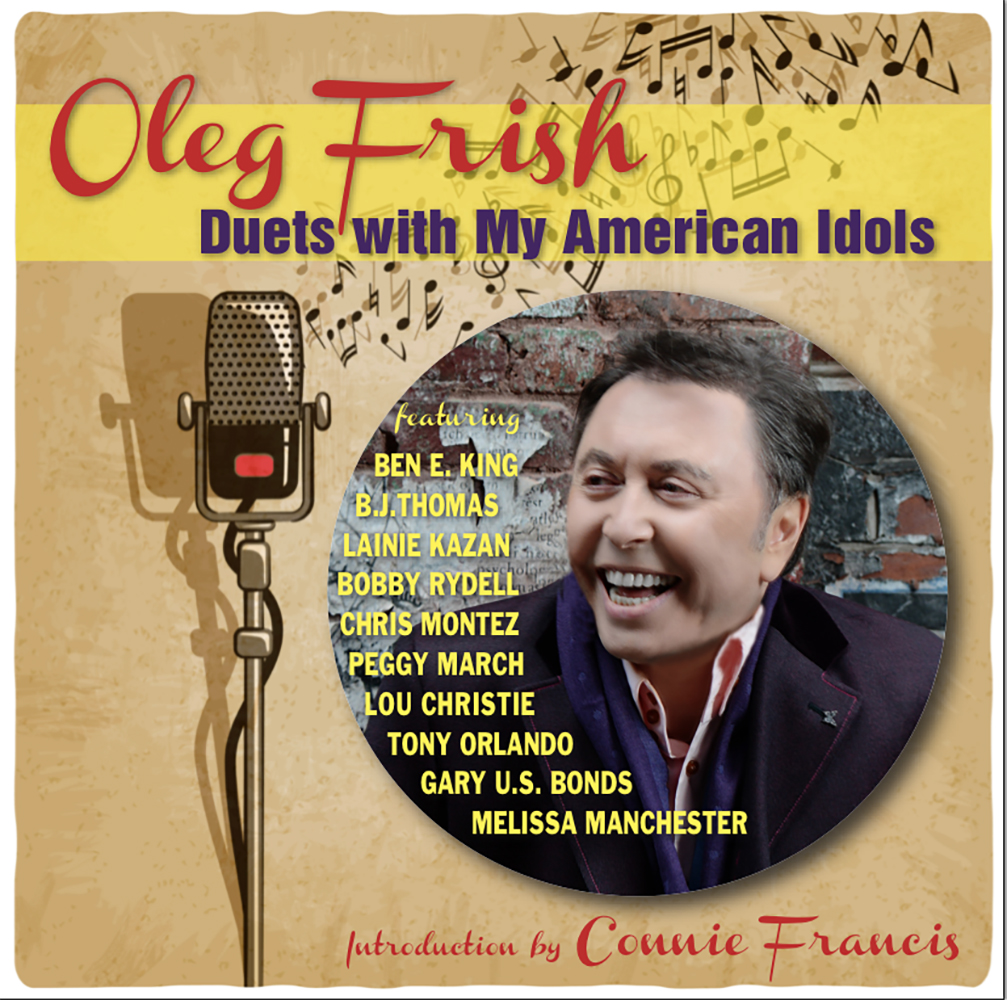
Duets with My American Idols

In 2014, Oleg finished the recording of his new CD "Oleg Frish and His American Idols", a set of duets with iconic American singers who were guests on his TV and Radio shows and now have recorded American classics with him - Bobby Rydell, Melissa Manchester, Ben E. King, Peggy March, Lainie Kazan, Tony Orlando, B.J. Thomas, Chris Montez, Lou Christie and Gary U.S. Bonds. The album was recorded at the Deep Diner Music Co. in New York in November 2014. The album is introduced by Connie Francis and was released in 2015. Sony Red distributed the album.

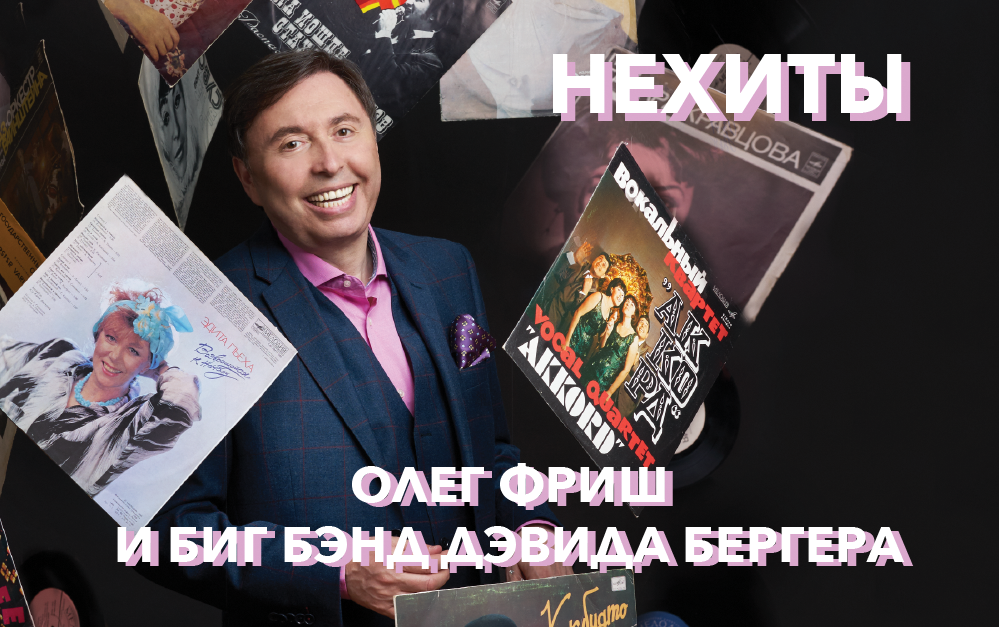
No Hits

In 2018, Oleg released a set of Soviet retro songs "No Hits". He recorded 15 tunes which were popular in the 50 - 70s of the 20th century. This was the first ever international project of Soviet retro music recorded with the American Big Band and a swinging vocal group arranged and conducted by David Berger (New York, USA). This project was released on a specially designed flash drive.

LIVE PERFORMANCES - Oleg Frish still performs on stage, touring with the Swing Around the World cabaret act. Oleg sings either with a jazz quartet or a septet in 19 languages. Throughout his career, he performed in New York: at the Metropolitan Room Iridium Jazz Club, 54 Below, Jazz on Main in Mt Kisco; in New Jersey at the Trumpets in Montclair; in California at the Catalina Jazz Club; in Florida at the Black Box Theater in Boca Raton. He toured in Australia at Foundry 616 in Sydney, in Moscow Russia, at the Kozlov Jazz Club and the International House of Music, as well as in Canada, Germany and Italy, among other countries.
