= VideoAmp =

Media measurement company

VideoAmp, Inc.
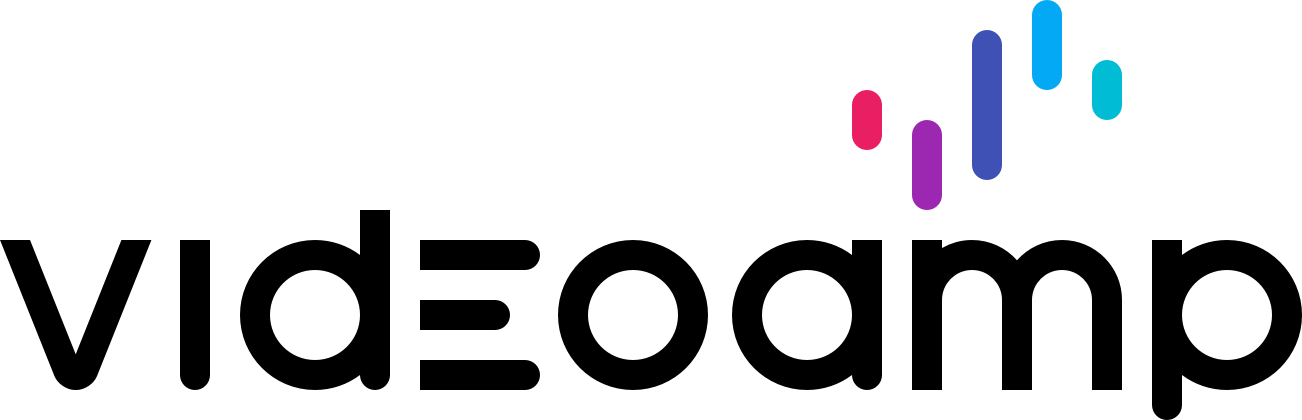
- Company type: Private
- Industry: Advertising
- Founded: 2014; 12 years ago
- Founder: Dave Gullo; Ross McCray
- Headquarters: Santa Monica, California
- Key people: Peter Liguori (CEO)
- Website: videoamp.com

VideoAmp is an advertising technology and media measurement company that provides services to advertisers to help them plan, optimize and measure media investments across platforms. They join Nielsen and Comscore as national TV currency companies as certified by the U.S. Joint Industry Committee (JIC).

== History ==
=== Founding and leadership ===
In 2014, VideoAmp was founded by Ross McCray and Dave Gullo in Santa Monica, California. The Los Angeles area was chosen over San Francisco because McCray and Gullo "believed that LA has recently shifted to become the epicenter of Technology & Media" and "a strong influx of top notch engineers migrating from the Bay to LA".

In August 2021, VideoAmp hired Tony Fagan as chief technology officer, who formerly was Google's vice president of ads data science and engineering. His role at VideoAmp was to increase VideoAmp's share in the media measurement marketplace.

In January 2024, VideoAmp CEO Ross McCray stepped down, along with VideoAmp announcing laying off 20% of its workforce.

In July 2025, Peter Liguori was appointed CEO after being executive chairman since 2023 and being a part of the board of directors. Liguori joins the company following the recent departure of chief commercial and growth officer Pete Bradbury, who was a former senior Nielsen executive.

=== Funding ===
In December 2014, VideoAmp raised a $2.2 million seed round of funding.

In 2015, VideoAmp raised $15 million in Series A funding headed by the European entertainment network RTL Group. Other investors who contributed to this funding include: Anthem Venture Partners, Simon Equity Partners, Third Wave Capital, Wavemaker Partners, and ZenShin Capital.

In August 2017, VideoAmp raised a $21.4 million Series B growth round led by Mediaocean. Moreover, Mediaocean CEO Bill Wise joined VideoAmp's board of directors.

In May 2019, the investment bank The Raine Group contributed $50 million and Ankona Capital contributed $20 million in funding to VideoAmp, totaling $70 million.

In 2021, VideoAmp raised $275 million at a $1.4 billion valuation.

=== Acquisitions and partnerships ===
In July 2018, it was announced that VideoAmp would acquire Boston-based data processor IronGrid, and announced a partnership with Vizio’s TV data-selling unit, Inscape. VideoAmp aimed to use IronGrid to process unstructured data from set-top boxes. As a part of the acquisition, VideoAmp retired the IronGrid name.

In April 2022, VideoAmp acquired Elsy, an analytics platform to help advertisers optimize media investments, with the aim of taking advantage of Elsy's services to help forecast business outcomes and track budgets.

In December 2022, The Walt Disney Company announced their data clean room would be integrated with VideoAmp in order for advertisers to match their own first-party data with Disney's audience graph for campaign measurement.

In October 2024, Paramount Global announced that it would end their contract with Nielsen Media Research to partner with VideoAmp instead for TV ratings, citing "substantial price increases" for changing their contract.

== TV currency ==
In 2024, VideoAmp along with Comscore were certified as national TV currency companies by the U.S. Joint Industry Committee (JIC). The certification was given based on having accurate and census-representative data that can reliably forecast reach and frequency.

== Vampfront ==
In 2025, VideoAmp hosted their second Vampfront at Mercer Labs Museum of Art and Technology. The term "Vampfront" is a play on words for the company's upfront event.
