= Peter Liguori =

American business executive (born 1960)

- Born: January 7, 1960 (age 66); The Bronx, New York City, U.S.
- Education: Yale University
- Spouse: Hannah ()

Peter Liguori (born January 7, 1960) is an American business executive and chief executive officer of VideoAmp. Previously, he was president and CEO of Tribune Media; he departed the company at the end of March 2017.

== Career ==
Between 1982 and 1986 he worked in advertising at Ogilvy & Mather and Saatchi & Saatchi. From 1986 to 1996 Liguori was vice president of consumer marketing, at HBO. He also held several positions in HBO's Home Video Division, including vice president of marketing and senior vice president of marketing.

Liguori joined Fox/Liberty Networks in 1996 as senior vice president of marketing, for a new joint venture, which now includes Fox Sports Net, FX, Fox Sports World, Speed, and National Geographic Channel. Liguori was president and CEO of News Corporation's FX Networks since 1998, overseeing business and programming operations for FX and Fox Movie Channel. From 2005 Liguori served as chairman of entertainment for Fox, credited with helping the channel FX grow in prominence. From 2009 Liguori served as chief operating officer of Discovery Communications.

He was appointed to the positions in January 2013, and is also a member of Tribune Media Company's board of directors. During his tenure, the company acquired Local TV Holdings, LLC, doubling the size of its local television station group, and Gracenote, combining it with Tribune Media Services to form one of the world's leading providers of entertainment metadata.

Liguori was a member of Yahoo!'s board from 2012 to 2014.

Liguori produced the independent feature film Big Night.

Liguori was elected to the board of trustees for the Paley Center for Media in October 2014.

In 2013, Liguori left Discovery to become CEO of Tribune Media which owned 23 television stations, WGN America on national cable, Chicago's WGN-AM radio station, several news and information websites and about a third of the Food Network.

In March 2017, Liguori stepped down as CEO of Tribune Media.

In July 2025, Liguori was appointed VideoAmp CEO after being executive chairman since 2023 and being a part of their board of directors.
