= New York Tattoo Museum =

Museum in New York, United States

Coordinates: 40°35′45.78″N 74°5′10.6″W

- Established: 2010
- Location: 203 Old Town Road, Staten Island, New York 10305, United States
- Director: Dozer
- Website: www.thetattooshop.net

The New York Tattoo Museum was a museum located at 203 Old Town Road in Staten Island's Old Town neighborhood above Dozer's shop. It was reported to be the first tattoo museum to open in New York City and housed mannequins displaying tattoo techniques, and other items from Dozer's collection. As of 2014, the museum was reported to have relocated to Medford, New York. and by 2017 it was reported to have closed.

== See also ==
- List of museums and cultural institutions in New York City
