= Williamsburg Biannual =

Arts organization in Brooklyn, NY

Coordinates: 40.71308°N 73.96738°W

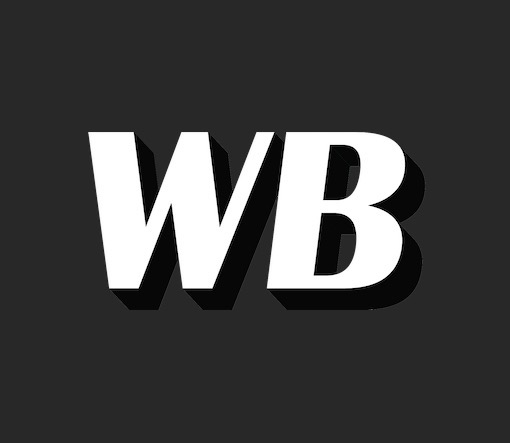
- Established: 2023
- Location: Williamsburg, Brooklyn, NY
- Type: Artist Space
- Founders: Goil Amornvivat, Divya Mahindra, Thomas (Tom) Morbitzer, Irene Mei Zhi Shum, Jorge A. Zapata
- Architect: JAZ Architect
- Website: www.williamsburgbiannual.org

The Williamsburg Biannual is an artist space in Brooklyn, New York, located at 333 Kent Avenue in the Williamsburg neighborhood. The purpose-built arts center is an adaptive reuse and expansion of a 10,000-square-foot (930 m^{2}) brick warehouse built in the 1920s, that once functioned as a bakery and as the studio of Italian artist Cosimo Cavallaro.

== See also ==
- List of museums and cultural institutions in New York City
