= Toy Museum of NY =

Travelling museum

- Location of museum within Brooklyn Heights, Brooklyn
- Former name: The Doll and Toy Museum of NYC
- Established: 1999
- Location: St. Ann & the Holy Trinity Church; Brooklyn Heights, Brooklyn
- Coordinates: 40.6946°N 73.9929°W
- Type: Toy museum
- Founder: Marlene Hochman
- Website: toymuseumny.org

The Toy Museum of NY is a theatrical and performance-based museum in Brooklyn which uses the museum's collection for its performances and to tell the story of societal change. It was founded in 1999 as The Doll and Toy Museum of NYC and given its current name in 2009. Later that same year it moved from its original location in Cobble Hill to its permanent location on the second floor of Brooklyn Heights' St. Ann & the Holy Trinity Church. Among the locations for the museum's traveling locations are the Brooklyn Heights and Bay Ridge public library branches.

== Collection ==
The museum's collection pays homage to the history of toys. Established by Marlene Hochman, the museum is a traveling museum with performances, workshops and webinars. In addition to rare dolls, the museum has a collection of classics like Mr. Potato Head, the original Frisbee pie pan, G.I. Joe, and the Easy-Bake Oven.
