= INTER =

Museum in New York City

Coordinates: 40°43′10″N 74°00′08″W

INTER, launched as INTER_, is an interactive and immersive museum with a focus on science in the SoHo neighborhood of New York City.

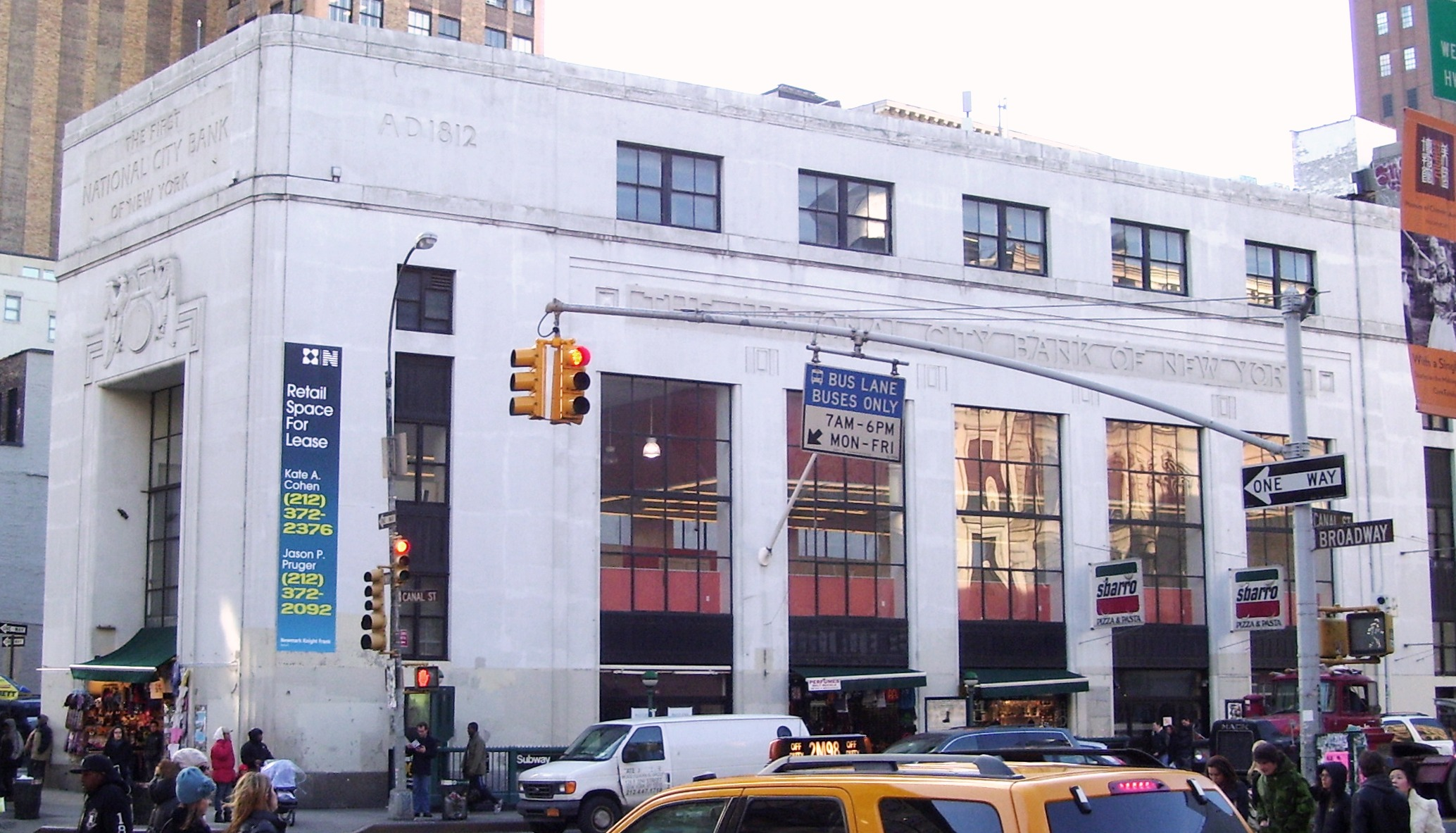

The space, conceived by the teams behind Fotografiska and the Museum of Ice Cream in the former First National City Bank building, opened in 2022 and has featured a number of themes before rebranding with a space theme in March 2025.
