= Mercer Labs Museum of Art and Technology =

Museum in New York City

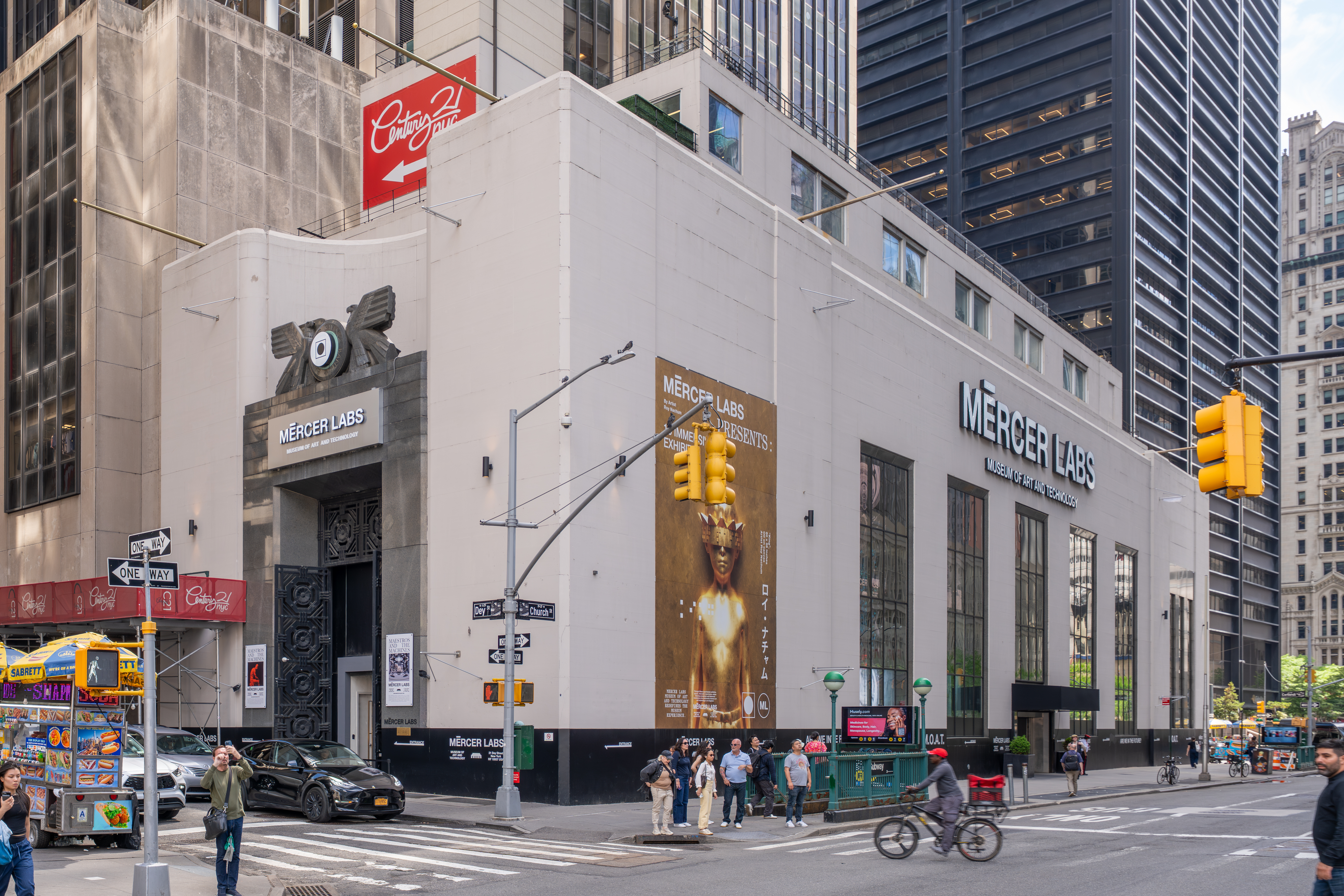

- Location within New York City
- Location: 21 Dey Street, Manhattan, New York, U.S.
- Coordinates: 40°42′38″N 74°00′39″W
- Type: private: science
- Curators: Roy Nachum; Michael Cayre
- Public transit access: WTC Cortlandt station
- Website: www.mercerlabs.com

Mercer Labs, also known as the Mercer Labs Museum of Art and Technology, is a museum in New York City located in part of the former Century 21 building. The museum was co-created by Roy Nachum and Michael Cayre.

The museum, which blends art and technology and features a range of accessible, immersive art, had a soft opening in February 2024 after originally targeting fall 2023.

== History ==
Roy Nachum and Michael Cayre co-founded Mercer Labs. Regarding the founding of the museum, Nachum commented that they've "always had this dream to create a space we can transform all the time". Moreover, Nachum was motivated to make their art accessible because their grandmother lost her vision and grandfather was in a wheelchair.

== Exhibits ==
Example exhibits at Mercer Labs
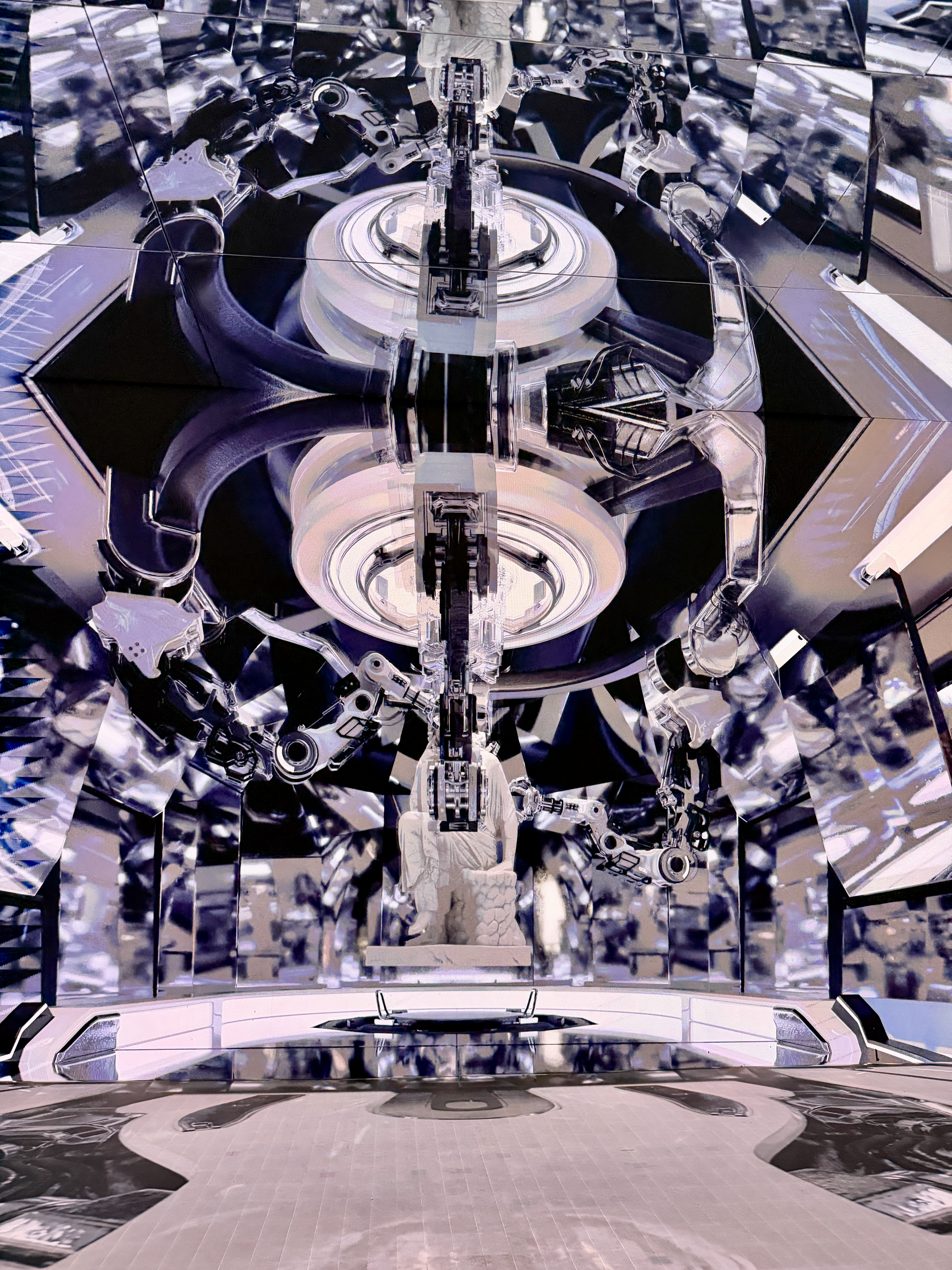

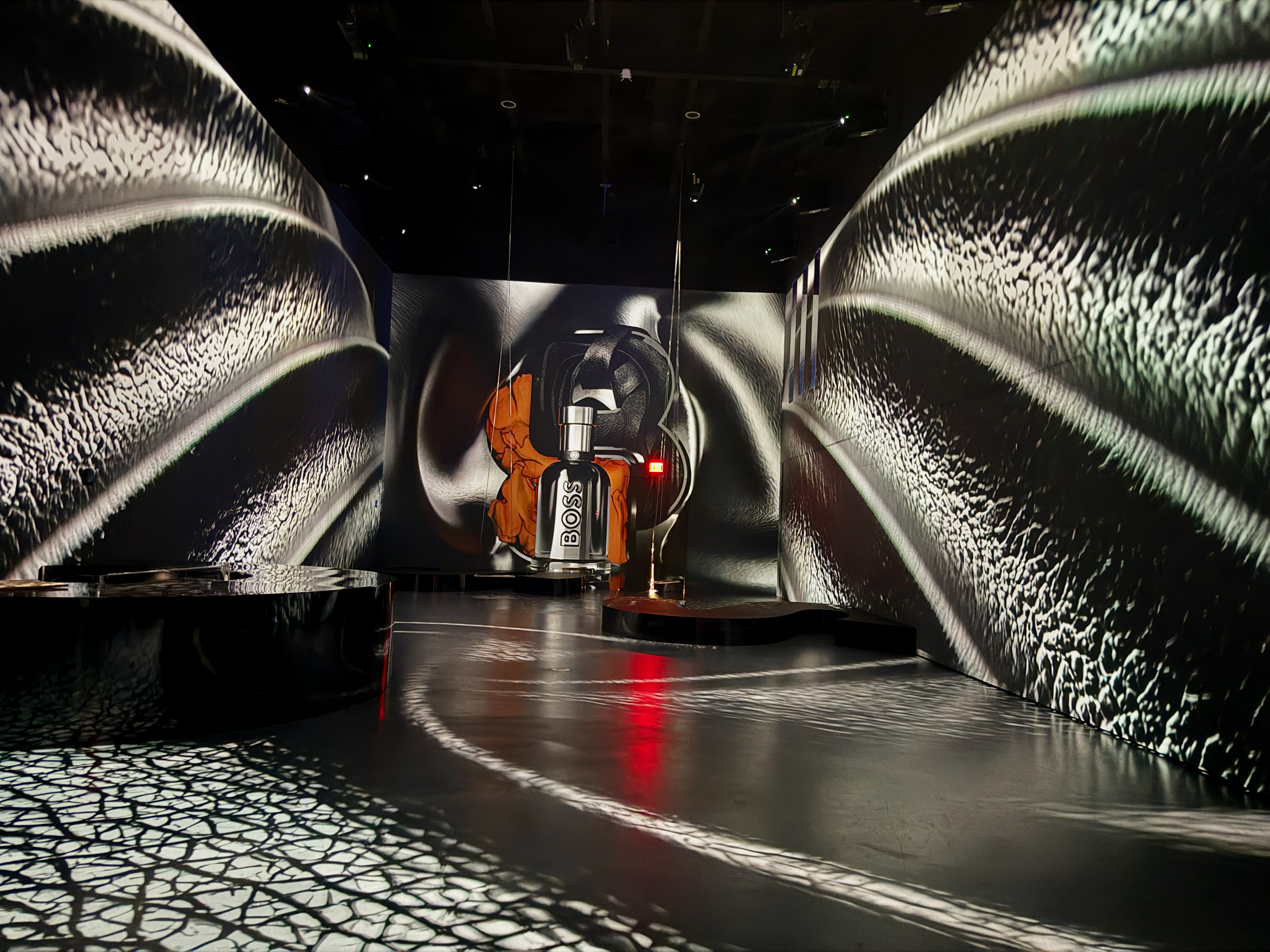

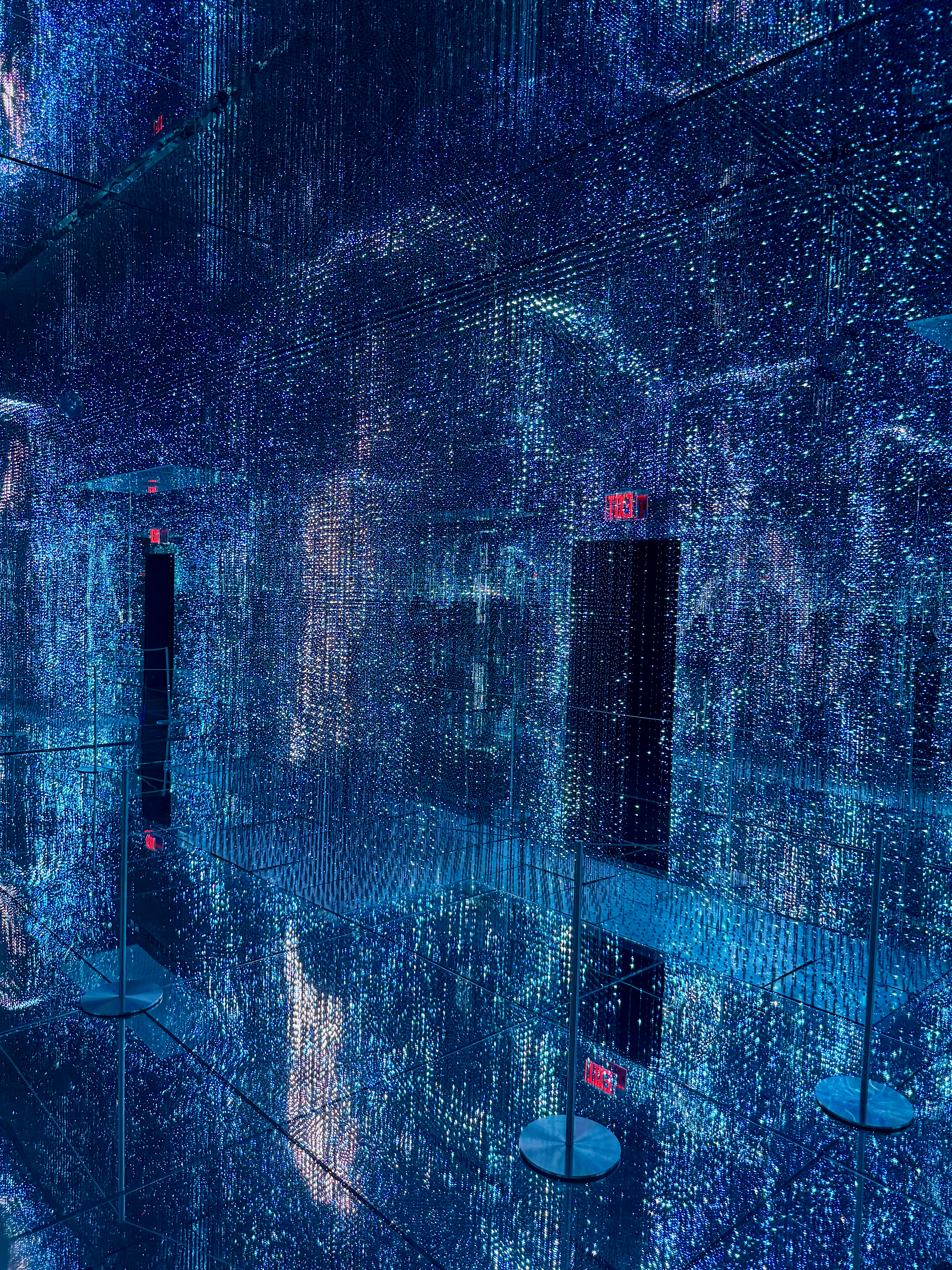

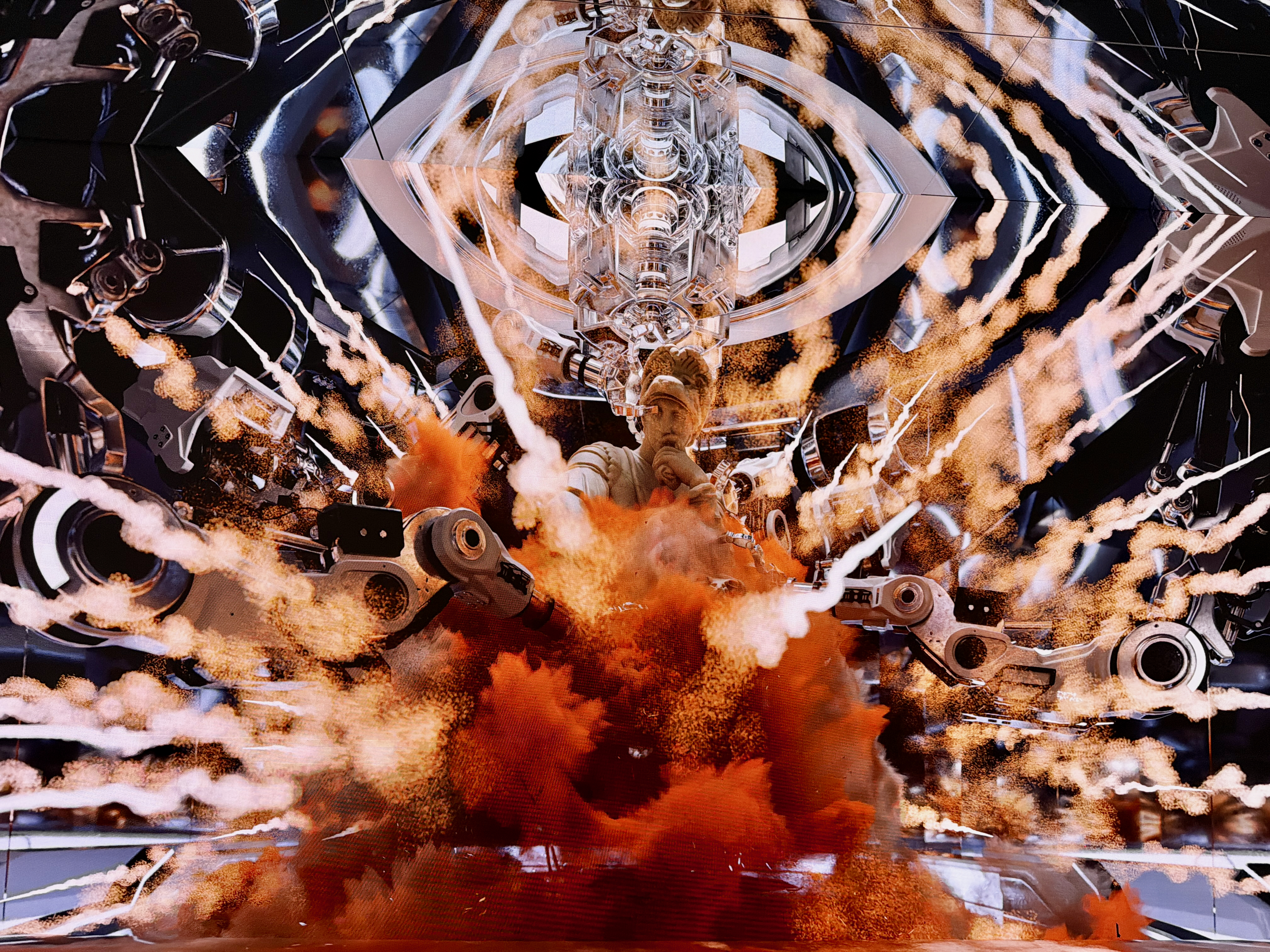

The museum contains fifteen different exhibition rooms that span 36,000 square feet (3,300 m^{2}). Each room uses multi-sensory experiences with the mixed use of technologies that includes 16K projections, 360-degree film experiences, interactive sound installations, and 4D sound systems. Moreover, Braille can be found throughout the museum.

Other collaborations with Mercer labs include the Tribeca Festival in 2024, Dua Lipa's "Radical Optimism" album, and Alicia Keys.

=== One Piece x Mercer Labs ===
On October 9, 2025 at New York Comic Con, it was announced there would be a collaboration between Mercer Labs and Toei Animation to develop an immersive experience featuring the anime One Piece. The partnership was led by Nasir Dean, Mercer Labs’ former Manager of Special Projects, and planned for this project when he first joined Mercer Labs to represent "the evolution of anime’s global influence". Dean's friend and partner Kokushin "Koke" Hirokawa helped facilitate the partnership with Toei Animation in Japan. The partnership with Toei was finalized in December 2024. The exhibit is open from October 9, 2025 to November 30, 2025.

== See also ==
- INTER
- TeamLab (art collective)
