= Cultural Museum of African Art =

- Former name: Museum of African Culture, Art and History (MACAH)
- Established: November 18, 2023
- Location: 1360 Fulton Street, 2nd Floor; Brooklyn, New York 11216
- Coordinates: 40°40′48″N 73°56′47″W
- Type: Art museum
- Collections: African art, artifacts, ceremonial objects
- Collection size: Over 3,000 pieces
- Founder: Eric Edwards
- Executive director: Eric Edwards
- Architect: Rodney Leon
- Public transit access: New York City Subway: Nostrand Avenue; Long Island Rail Road: Atlantic Branch: Nostrand Avenue; New York City Bus: B25, B44 buses
- Website: cmaaeec.org

The Cultural Museum of African Art, also known as CMAAEEC and the Museum of African Culture Art and History, is a museum dedicated to African art and cultural heritage located in the Bedford-Stuyvesant neighborhood of Brooklyn, New York City. The museum houses one of the largest private collections of African art in the United States, comprising over 3,000 artifacts representing all 54 African countries and spanning approximately 4,000 years of history. It is one of only three museums in the United States exclusively dedicated to African art, alongside the Smithsonian National Museum of African Art in Washington, D.C., and The Africa Center in Manhattan, New York.

== History ==
=== Origins ===
The museum's collection was assembled over more than 50 years by Eric Edwards, a retired AT&T executive and Brooklyn native. Edwards began collecting African art in the early 1970s, acquiring pieces through professional and personal travels, private sales, auctions, and relationships with artists, artisans, gallery owners, and royal families throughout Africa. The collection was initially housed in Edwards' Clinton Hill apartment, where it grew to fill the living space with masks, sculptures, musical instruments, ceremonial objects, and other cultural artifacts.

The Cultural Museum of African Art was incorporated in 2014. In 2015, the institution received its charter from the New York State Board of Regents and was recognized as a 501(c)(3) nonprofit organization. That same year, Edwards launched a Kickstarter campaign seeking $35,000 to establish a public museum for his collection, which was then valued at approximately $10 million. The campaign aimed to make the collection accessible to the public, particularly to educate young people of African descent about their cultural heritage.

=== Establishment and opening ===
The museum occupies approximately 7,000 square feet on the second floor of Restoration Plaza at 1360 Fulton Street. On October 22, 2022, the museum held a groundbreaking ceremony at Restoration Plaza in Bedford-Stuyvesant. The event drew over 350 attendees and featured speeches from local dignitaries, including New York State Assemblywoman Stefani Zinerman, architect Rodney Leon, and scholar Dr. Leonard Jeffries. The space was designed by architect Rodney Leon, who also designed the African Burial Ground National Monument in Manhattan.

The museum officially opened to the public on November 18, 2023, with its inaugural exhibition titled ""Brooklyn is Africa: Survival + Persistence = Resistance." The ceremony drew approximately 100 attendees and featured remarks from Blondel A. Pinnock, president and CEO of Bedford Stuyvesant Restoration Corporation; Sidique Yai, Sierra Leonean ambassador to the United States; and New York State Assemblywoman Stefani Zinerman. The event included jazz and contemporary dance performances, as well as commemorations of the 60th anniversary of Martin Luther King Jr.'s March on Washington and the 60th anniversary of the Birmingham Church Bombing.

== Collection ==
The permanent collection comprises over 3,000 African artifacts spanning approximately 4,000 years, from ancient Nubian civilization through contemporary works. The collection is organized to reflect the diverse functions of art in African societies and represents all 54 African countries. The collection includes musical instruments, textiles and adornment, as well as contemporary works by 20th and 21st-century African artists, providing a comprehensive view of African artistic production across time periods and cultural contexts. CMAAEEC frequently loans pieces to events across New York State celebrating African culture and history.

=== Selected works ===
Several works in the collection are of particular historical and artistic importance. A palace door carved by Yoruba artist Olowe of Ise ranks among the museum's most historically significant pieces. Olowe, who worked in southwestern Nigeria during the early 20th century, received commissions from several Yoruba rulers and gained recognition as a master sculptor. His palace door at the museum demonstrates the carved architectural elements that decorated royal compounds in precolonial Yoruba kingdoms.

The collection includes bronze leopards that functioned as royal insignia, evidencing metalworking expertise in precolonial West Africa. Other West African art includes a Dogon sculpture from Mali depicts a mounted horseman, an iconographic form associated with family relationships in Dogon belief systems, a ceremonial drum made by the Kinga people of Nigeria that bears relief carvings mixing human and animal imagery in patterns typical of objects made for palace use, an Ikenga ancestral shrine symbolizing heritage and strength in Igbo culture, and a carving of Yaa Asantewaa, Ashanti warrior queen.

From Central Africa, the museum holds a Songye power figure from the Democratic Republic of the Congo once used in protective rituals. Objects from Cameroon's Bamum people include ceremonial masks, helmets, carved figures, and shrine elements.

Selected pieces have appeared in exhibitions at other institutions. The Metropolitan Museum of Art has displayed works from the collection. In 2024, the museum loaned sixteen sculptures to SUNY Old Westbury's Amelie A. Wallace Gallery for an exhibition titled "African Art and Its Historic Value Systems in Educating a People." The sculptures represented eight countries: Sierra Leone, Angola, Gabon, Republic of the Congo, Cameroon, Nigeria, Ivory Coast, Guinea, and Mali. The Romare Bearden estate donated works to the museum in 2025.

== Programs ==
The museum's stated mission is to educate the public about African art and cultural traditions through exhibitions and programs. The institutional philosophy draws from the West African Sankofa principle, symbolized by a bird looking backward while moving forward, and holds that understanding the past is essential for progress. CMAAEEC runs a virtual reality tour that allows global audiences to explore the collection remotely with three-dimensional views and historical narratives.

== Funding and support ==
In February 2024, New York City Mayor Eric Adams announced a $5 million capital grant to support the museum's infrastructure and operational needs. The grant was presented during a Black History Month celebration and recognized Edwards' decades of work in preserving and sharing African cultural heritage.

In July 2025, the museum received an additional $1 million operational grant from the New York State Assembly. The museum is also supported by the New York City Department of Cultural Affairs and has received programming grants from the Brooklyn Arts Council.

== See also ==
- Museum of Contemporary African Diasporan Arts (MoCADA)
- Brooklyn Museum – Arts of Africa collection
- The Africa Center
- African art
- National Museum of African Art
- List of museums in New York City
