= House of Cannabis =

Marijuana museum in New York City

Coordinates: 40°43′12″N 74°0′6″W

THC NYC is a museum located at 427 Broadway in the SoHo neighborhood of Manhattan that celebrates the role of cannabis in art, pop culture, fashion and more. The museum, which features ten exhibits across five floors of the building, was originally slated to open in fall 2022 in only three floors of the building.
