= MICRO (organization) =

Non-profit organization

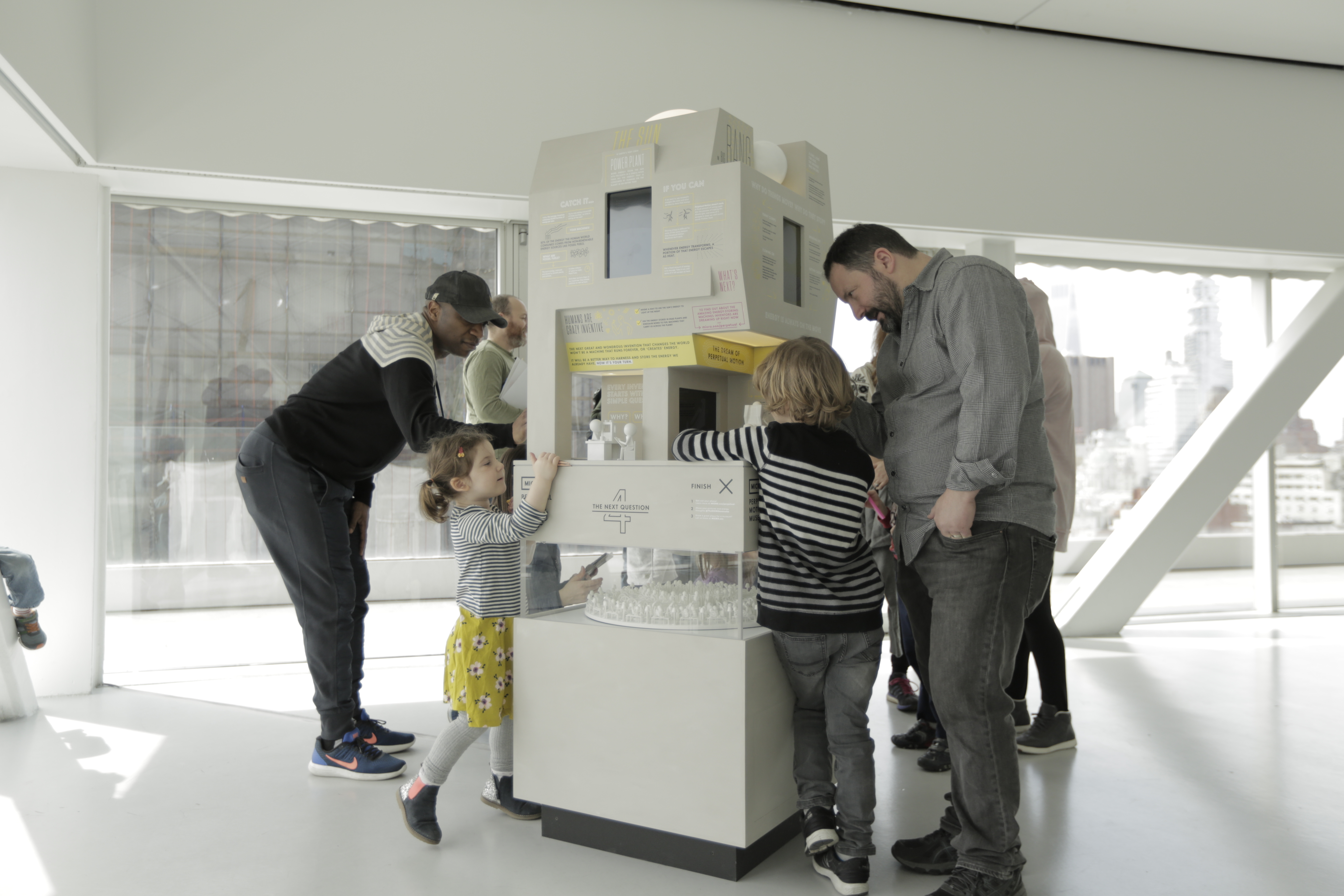
- Formation: 2017; 8 years ago
- Founder: Amanda Schochet; Charles Philipp
- Website: micro.ooo

MICRO is a non-profit organization that builds six-foot-tall museums that are installed in public spaces such as in transit hubs, community centers, and hospital waiting rooms. Each museum explores a topic through interactive displays, such as holograms, videos, and 3D printed sculptures.

MICRO currently has three museum series in public release: the Smallest Mollusk Museum, the Perpetual Motion Museum, and the Museum of Care.

== History ==
MICRO was founded by scientist Amanda Schochet and advertising producer Charles Philipp in 2017, who also previously worked on the Cartoon Network show, The Amazing World of Gumball, as a post producer, puppet fabricator, and voice actor. Prior to founding MICRO, Schochet was a computational ecologist and researcher for NASA and the Smithsonian, while Philipp developed and produced media and advertising.

MICRO's first museum series, the Smallest Mollusk Museum, launched publicly in October 2017 and shares the history and science of mollusks, a diverse group of invertebrates. The second MICRO Museum series, the Perpetual Motion Museum, discusses physics and engineering, and explores the history of humanity's efforts to capture and store energy. In 2020, in response to COVID-19, MICRO developed a free educational guide called MICRO DIY, which allows people to build museum exhibits out of objects they find in their own homes.

== Locations ==
Lincoln Medical Center, Bronx Family Courts, LinkedIn Building, Brooklyn Public Library, Ronald McDonald House NY, Bellevue Hospital in Kips Bay, Ace Hotel, Rockefeller Center Concourse, the Brooklyn Navy Yards, Pioneer Works in Red Hook, and Governors Island.
