= Museum of Broadway =

History museum in Manhattan, New York

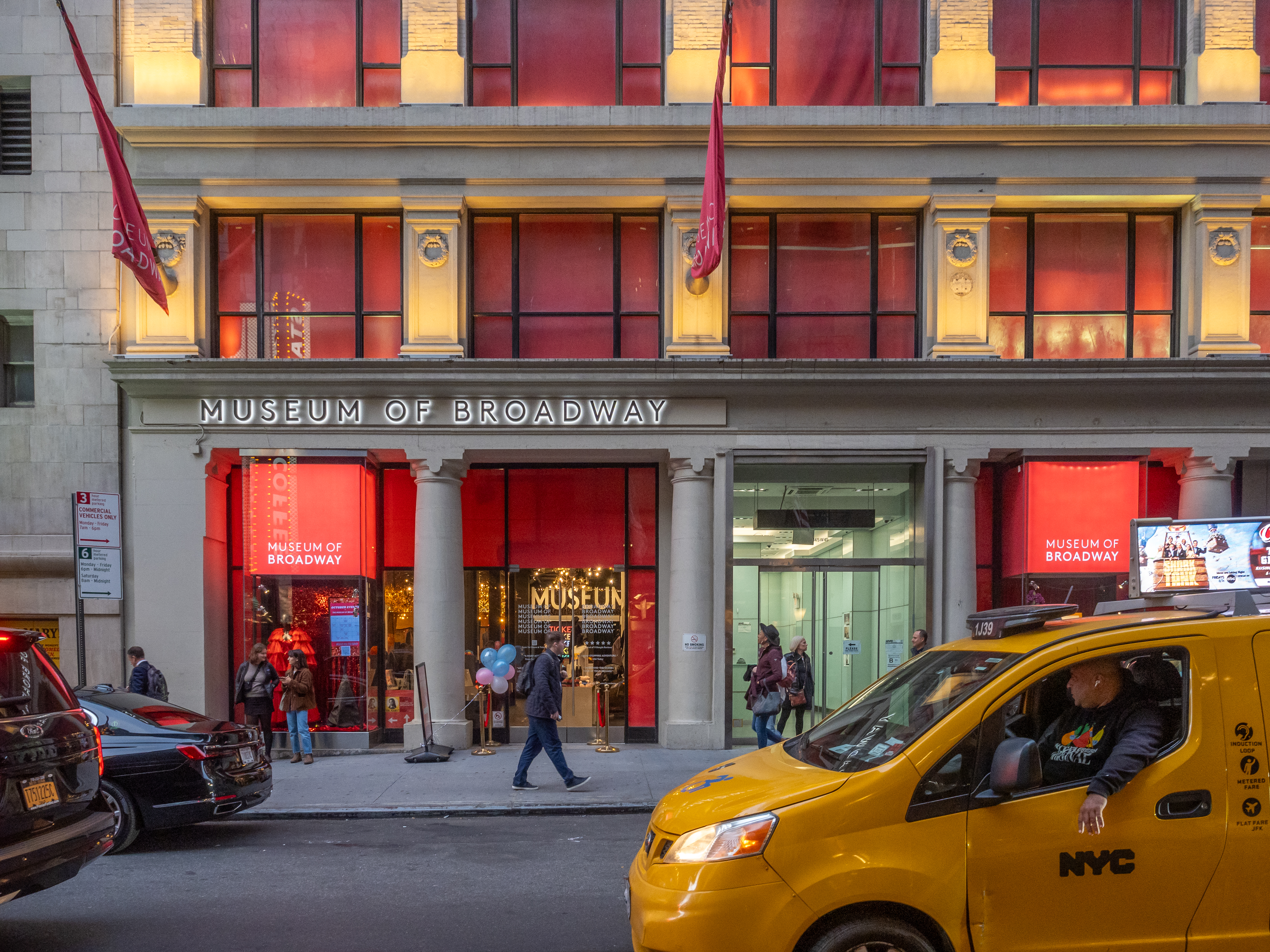
- (2024)
- Established: November 15, 2022
- Location: 145 West 45th Street; Midtown Manhattan, New York City
- Coordinates: 40°45′27″N 73°59′04″W
- Founders: Julie Boardman and Diane Nicoletti
- Website: themuseumofbroadway.com

The Museum of Broadway, on 145 West 45th Street in Times Square, is the first permanent museum dedicated to documenting the history and experience of Broadway theatre and its profound influence upon shaping Midtown Manhattan Times Square, and New York City.

== Museum history ==
The Museum of Broadway was founded by Julie Boardman and Diane Nicoletti in collaboration with Playbill, Broadway Cares/Equity Fights AIDS, the Billy Rose Theatre Division at the New York Public Library for the Performing Arts, the Al Hirschfeld Foundation, Goodspeed Musicals, Creative Goods, and Concord Theatricals.

Following a decade of planning for the museum as a means of bringing a new audience to Broadway amid an era of interactive museums, the museum opened on November 15, 2022. It was originally scheduled to open in 2020, but its construction and development were delayed by the COVID-19 pandemic.

In November 2025, the museum established a philanthropic division called the Broadway Legacy Foundation.

== Exhibits ==
The museum covers more than three hundred years of Broadway history, including costumes and props from more than 500 productions.

The 26,000-square-foot (2,400 m^{2}) museum comprises three sections: The Map Room, featuring a short film that outlines the history of theater in New York and the location of the extant theatres; a two-floor Broadway timeline; and the Making of a Broadway Show.

The museum has both permanent and temporary exhibits. Some previous temporary exhibits have included Moulin Rouge! The Musical: Spectacular, Spectacular (2024), The Rockettes 100th Anniversary: A Century of Sisterhood (2025), Stages of Imagination: The Iconic Broadway Designs of David Korins (2025), and Craft of Broadway Puppetry (2026).

In 2026, the museum hosted an event called "Casting the Role of a Lifeline" to find bone marrow donor matches in honor of The Lion King cast member, eleven-year-old Shannon Tavarez, who died from leukemia in 2010 after being unable to find a donor match.
